= Colonial architecture in Jakarta =

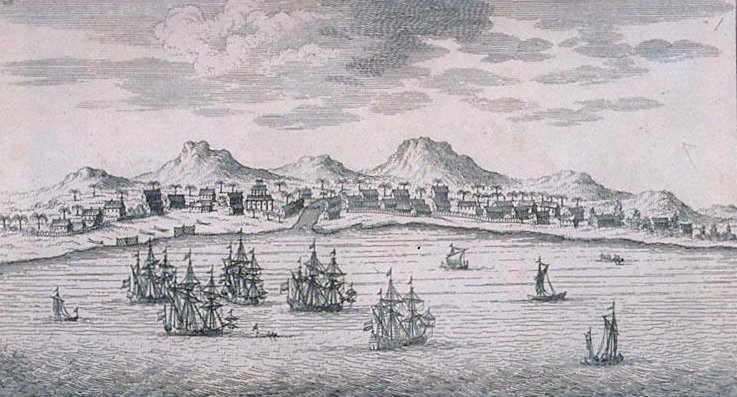
Jayakarta circa 1605–8, before its complete destruction by the Dutch, showing earlier pre-colonial structures before Batavia was founded

Colonial buildings and structures in Jakarta include those that were constructed during the Dutch colonial period of Indonesia. The period (and the subsequent style) succeeded the earlier period when Jakarta (known then as Jayakarta/Jacatra), governed by the Sultanate of Banten, were completely eradicated and replaced with a walled city of Batavia. The dominant styles of the colonial period can be divided into three periods: the Dutch Golden Age (17th to late 18th century), the transitional style period (late 18th century – 19th century), and Dutch modernism (20th century). Dutch colonial architecture in Jakarta is apparent in buildings such as houses or villas, churches, civic buildings, and offices, mostly concentrated in the administrative city of Central Jakarta and West Jakarta.

Below is a list of colonial buildings and structures found in Jakarta. The list is sorted alphabetically according to its official (local) name. The list can also be sorted to each category.

Buildings that were renovated in a manner that significantly changed their appearance are listed separately to distinguish the different architectural form.

Some notable Chinese-style buildings and Islamic mosques that were built during these period are included in the list for comparison.

== Dutch East India Company period – 17th to late 18th century ==
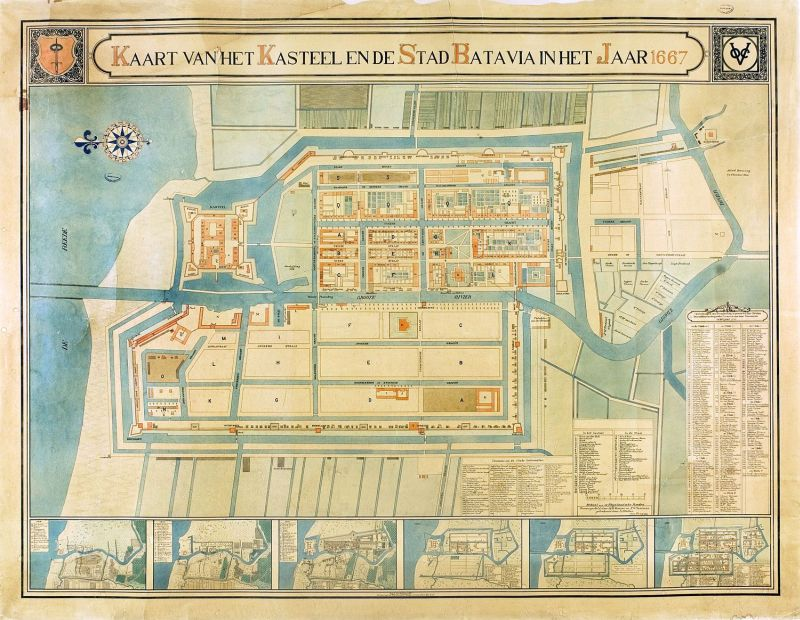
A map of Batavia

The first type of colonial architecture grew from the early Dutch settlements in the 17th century when settlements were generally within walled defenses to protect them from attack by other European trade rivals and native revolt. Following the siege of Jayakarta (previously known as Sunda Kelapa) and its demolition by the Dutch in 1619, it was decided to build the headquarters of the Dutch East India Company on the site. Simon Stevin was commissioned to design a plan for the future settlement based on his concept of the 'ideal city'. His response was a rectangular, walled town, bisected by the river Ciliwung which was to be channeled into a straight canal (later known as Grote Rivier or Kali Besar or "Big River" in this area). This new city is called Batavia (now Jakarta). In accordance with Stevin's model, the fortress of Batavia was the most prominent building in the city, symbolizing the center of power, while townhall, markets, and other public buildings were distributed. This layout of Jakarta can still be clearly recognized today in Jakarta Old Town through the layout of the streets and canals, although most of the original 17th-century structures had been destroyed or replaced with newer early 20th-century structures.

The architecture style of this period was the tropical counterparts of 17th-century Dutch architecture. Typical features include the typically Dutch high sash windows with split shutters, gable roofs, and white-coral painted wall (as opposed to exposed brick architecture in the Netherlands). This earlier period of Jakarta had many of the buildings solidly built with relatively enclosed structures, a structure that is not very friendly to tropical climate as compared to the architecture of the next period in Jakarta. The best examples of these types of buildings were located along the Tygersgracht (now Jalan Muka Timur) and all of them were demolished. The best surviving example is Toko Merah.

Several types of Portuguese colonial architecture also exist, usually outside the walled city of Batavia. Tugu Church and Sion Church, with their plain facades and domed windows, are some surviving examples.

In 1808, Daendels officially moved the city center to the south because of the deteriorating condition of the inner town as well as the malaria outbreak. As a result, many buildings and structures from this period were left to deteriorate. Because of financial issues, many buildings were demolished in the 19th century and the debris was used to construct newer structure in the south, such as the Palace of Governor-General Daendels (now the Financial Department of Indonesia) from the debris of Batavia Castle, and Batavia Theater (now Gedung Kesenian Jakarta) from the debris of the Spinhuis.

Later, these empty lots in Jakarta Old Town were filled with newer 20th-century structures. Surviving 17th–18th structures were later converted as Jakarta's cultural heritage, e.g. Toko Merah, Gereja Sion and Jakarta History Museum.

Other dominant architecture styles from this period were the Chinese merchant houses, many were built during the 18th century. Many of these structures show an eclectic mix of Dutch and Chinese influences.

Last official name	Former names	Year	Architect	Location	Latest image	Oldest image
18th-century Dutch mansion at Kali Besar Barat (Gedung Singa Kuning)	Bank of China, formerly Firma Tels & Co	18th century	anonymous	6°08′11″S 106°48′41″E		
Arsip Nasional	Reynier de Klerck house	1760	Reynier de Klerck	6°09′14″S 106°49′01″E		
Baijen's Country House and the Outer Hospital (demolished, replaced by Citadel Prins Frederik)	Baijen's Country House and the Buiten-hospital	before 1669, later a hospital, from 1743 until 1820.	anonymous	6°10′13″S 106°49′51″E		
Bastion Amsterdam (demolished)	Amsterdam	1632–1635	anonymous	6°07′46″S 106°48′54″E	—	
Bastion Buren (demolished)	Buren	before 1650	anonymous	6°07′41″S 106°48′28″E	—	
Bastion Cuylenburg (partly demolished, on its site stands Menara Syahbandar)	Cuylenburg, Cullenburch, Culemborg	1645	anonymous	6°07′39″S 106°48′33″E		
Bastion Diest and gate (demolished)	Diest, Diestpoort	1632–1635 (bastion), 1638 (gate), 1657 (gate strengthened with stone)	anonymous	6°08′12″S 106°48′42″E		
Bastion Enkhuizen (demolished)	Enkhuizen	1627–1632	anonymous	6°08′05″S 106°48′59″E		
Bastion Friesland (demolished)	Friesland	1632–1635	anonymous	6°07′55″S 106°48′22″E	—	
Bastion Gelderland (demolished)	Gelderland, Punt Gelderland	1627–1632	anonymous	6°08′15″S 106°49′00″E		
Bastion Grimbergen (demolished)	Grimbergen	1635–1650	anonymous		—	
Bastion Groningen (demolished)	Groningen	1632–1635 (replacing the older Buren fortification)	anonymous	6°07′37″S 106°48′17″E	—	
Bastion Hollandia (demolished)	Hollandia	1627–1632	anonymous	6°08′19″S 106°48′46″E		
Bastion Middelburg (demolished)	Middelburg	1627–1632	anonymous	6°07′51″S 106°48′55″E	—	
Bastion Nassau (demolished)	Nassau	1632–1635	anonymous	6°08′14″S 106°48′38″E		
Bastion Oranje (demolished)	Oranje	1627–1632	anonymous	6°08′15″S 106°48′52″E		
Bastion Overrijsel (demolished)	Overrijsel	1632–1635	anonymous	6°07′47″S 106°48′20″E	—	
Bastion Rotterdam (demolished)	Rotterdam	1627–1632	anonymous	6°07′58″S 106°48′57″E		
Bastion Utrecht and portal (demolished)	Utrecht Poort	1635–1650	anonymous	6°08′07″S 106°48′25″E		
Bastion Vierkant (demolished)	Vierkant	1627–1632 (Note: The location of the Vierkant point was earlier the location of the English lodge / Shabandar point which exist prior the establishment of Batavia.)	anonymous	6°07′36″S 106°48′28″E	—	
Bastion Zeeburg (partly demolished in 2017)	Zeeburch poort	1632–1635	anonymous	6°07′34″S 106°48′28″E	—	
Bastion Zeeland (demolished)	Zeeland poort	1627–1632	anonymous	6°08′16″S 106°48′28″E		
Batavia City Hall (1st) and church (demolished between 1622 and 1627.)	Kerk en Stadhuis	1619–1622	anonymous	6°07′57″S 106°48′42″E	—	
Batavia City Hall (2nd) (replaced with Batavia City Hall (3rd))	Batavia Stadhuis	1627		6°08′07″S 106°48′48″E	—	
Binnenhospital, "Inner Hospital" (closed in 1808, demolished in 1910 for De Javasche Bank)	Binnenhospital	1641	anonymous	6°08′14″S 106°48′46″E		
Chinese hospital and home for the aged (formally closed in 1912, later demolished)	Sinees Sieken Huys	1646	anonymous	6°08′05″S 106°48′27″E	—	
De Middelpunt, "the middle point"	De Middelpunt	1650–1667	anonymous	6°08′03″S 106°48′40″E		
De Portugese Stadskerk (burned down in 1808)	De Portugese Stadskerk, De Portugese Binnenkerk	1650–1667, 1669–1672	—	6°08′02″S 106°48′37″E		
Fort Ancol (demolished)	Fort Zouteland, Schaans Zouteland	1656	anonymous	6°07′36″S 106°50′43″E	—	
Fort Angke (demolished)	See Fort Anké	1657	anonymous		—	
Fort Jacatra (Nassau and Mauritius) (dismantled between 1627 and 1632)	Fort Jacatra	before 1619		6°07′43″S 106°48′36″E	—	
Fort Jacarta Buiten Batavia (demolished)	Fort Jacarta Buiten Batavia		anonymous	6°08′43″S 106°49′50″E	—	
Fort Meester Cornelis (demolished)	Fort Meester Cornelis	1734	anonymous	6°12′05″S 106°51′00″E		
Fort Noordwijk (demolished in 1808)	Fort Noordwijk	1658	anonymous	6°10′04″S 106°49′51″E	—	
Fort Zevenhoek (demolished)	Fort Zevenhoek	1657	anonymous		—	
Fort Rijswijk (abandoned in 1697, demolished in 1729)	Fort Rijswijk	August 1656	anonymous	6°10′03″S 106°49′08″E		
Galangan VOC Restaurant and Ta San Yen	Carpenter's shop of the Dutch East Indies	1627–1632 or before 1650 or 1727	anonymous	6°07′42″S 106°48′32″E		
Gedung Candra Naya (1957)	Landhuis Kroet / Landhuis Van Majoor der Chinezen Khouw Kim An or "residence of Chinese Mayor Khouw Kim An"	18th century	Khouw Tjoen (first resident)	6°08′50″S 106°48′55″E		
Gerbang Amsterdam or "Amsterdam Gate" (demolished in the 1950s)	Amsterdamsepoort, Pinangpoort, Kasteelpoort	1744		6°07′51″S 106°48′43″E	1947	
Gereja Sion	De Portugese Buitenkerk	1695	E. Ewout Verhagen	6°08′17″S 106°49′05″E		
Gereja Tugu	Portuguese Church	1676–1678, rebuilt in 1737, and later in 1748.	Melchior Leidecker, later rebuilt by Julius Vinck	6°07′26″S 106°55′27″E		
Government House or a 'Playhouse' (demolished)	Huis van de Generaal/Speelhuis	1632-1650	anonymous	6°08′31″S 106°48′55″E	—	
Great Palace of Weltevreden (demolished in 1820, now Gatot Soebroto Army Hospital)	Great Palace of Weltevreden / Landhuis Weltevreden	1761	for Jacob Mossel (Note: The house was bought by Van der Parra in 1767.)	6°10′36″S 106°50′12″E	—	
Groeneveld (estate)	Tandjoeng Oost Huis, "Gedong Tinggi"	1756–1760	Pieter van de Velde (first owner)	6°18′10″S 106°51′23″E		
Jembatan Gantung Kota Intan	Engelse Brug / Het Middelpuntbrug / Grote Boom or "Large Tree Bridge" / Djembatan Hoenderpasser Kali Besar or Hoenderpasserbrug or "Chicken Market Bridge" (1900s) / Ophaalbrug Juliana (1938)	1655 (after the demolition of earlier English Bridge, located 100 meter to the south), 1937 (renovated)		6°07′53″S 106°48′38″E		
Kasteel Batavia	Kasteel Batavia	1619	anonymous	6°07′40″S 106°48′41″E		
Mesjid Luar Batang, Luar Batang Mosque	Mesjid Luar Batang	1739 (established)	Sayid Husein bin Abubakar Alaydrus (founder)	6°07′26″S 106°48′24″E		
Mohr Observatory (demolished in 1812)	Mohr Observatory	1765	Johan Maurits Mohr	6°08′38″S 106°48′46″E		
Museum Bahari	Warehouse	1652–1771	anonymous	6°07′36″S 106°48′30″E		
Museum Sejarah Jakarta	Batavia City Hall (3rd)	1706–1710	W.J. van der Velde	6°08′07″S 106°48′48″E		
Nieuwe Hollandse Kerk, "New Church of Holland" (destroyed by earthquake in 1808, Wayang Museum is now on its site)	Nieuwe Hollandse Kerk, Groote Hollandse Kerk	1736		6°08′06″S 106°48′45″E		
Nieuwe Poort, "New Gate" (demolished)	Nieuwe Poort	1627–1632	anonymous	6°08′18″S 106°48′50″E		
Old Gelderland defence works (demolished after 1667)	Oud Gelderland	1622–1627	anonymous	6°08′06″S 106°48′56″E	—	
Oude Hollandse Kerk, "Old Holland Church" (demolished in 1732, bottom part still visible) (Note: The Old Church of Holland was demolished to make way for the organ that was too large for the church.)	Oude Hollandse Kerk / Kruiskerk, "Cross Church"	1640	anonymous	6°08′06″S 106°48′45″E		
Oude Utrechtse Poort, "Old Utrecht Gate" (demolished)	Oude Utrechtse Poort (Note: Earlier it was the location of the Zeeland defence point to the west of Batavia.)	1632–1650	anonymous	6°08′10″S 106°48′26″E	—	
Pasar Ikan, "Fish Market"	Vismarkt		anonymous			
Playhouse of Adriaan van Hafte	Playhouse of Adriaan van Hafte	18th century	anonymous	Tanjung Priok	—	
Raja Kuring Restaurant	Carpenter's shop of the Chinese	1632–1635	anonymous	6°07′48″S 106°48′35″E		
Spinhuis, "spinning-house for single women" (later merged with Chinese Hospital, then demolished)	Spinhuis, Spinhuys	1635–1650	anonymous	6°08′03″S 106°48′30″E	—	
The Latin and Greek School (demolished)	The Latin and Greek School	1622-1627	anonymous	6°07′55″S 106°48′48″E	—	
Toko Merah	see Toko Merah	1730 (Note: According to a plaque in front of Toko Merah.)	for Gustaaf Willem van Imhoff	6°08′09″S 106°48′41″E		
Vihara Dharma Bhakti	Kim Tek Ie	1650, 1755 (restored)	Kwee Hoen (Guo Xun-Gan)	6°08′38″S 106°48′46″E		
Vismarkt, "Fish Market" (earlier structure) (demolished)	Vismarkt, Vischmarkt	1632–1635	anonymous	6°07′50″S 106°48′36″E		
Waterkasteel (demolished)	Waterkasteel / "Hornwerk"	1741, 1750	anonymous	6°06′58″S 106°48′24″E	—	
Wooden former office building at Kali Besar Timur (abandoned)	Various offices; Chinese shops (early 18th-century)	early 18th-century	anonymous	6°08′06″S 106°48′43″E		

== Colonialism – late 18th century to 1870 ==
After the VOC was formally dissolved in 1800 the Batavian Republic expanded all the VOC's territorial claims into a fully fledged colony named the Dutch East Indies. From the company's regional headquarters Batavia now evolved into the capital of the colony. In 1808 Daendels moved the old town center to higher ground to the south and urbanized the area known as Weltevreden. During the British interregnum Daendels was replaced by Raffles who governed until 1816.

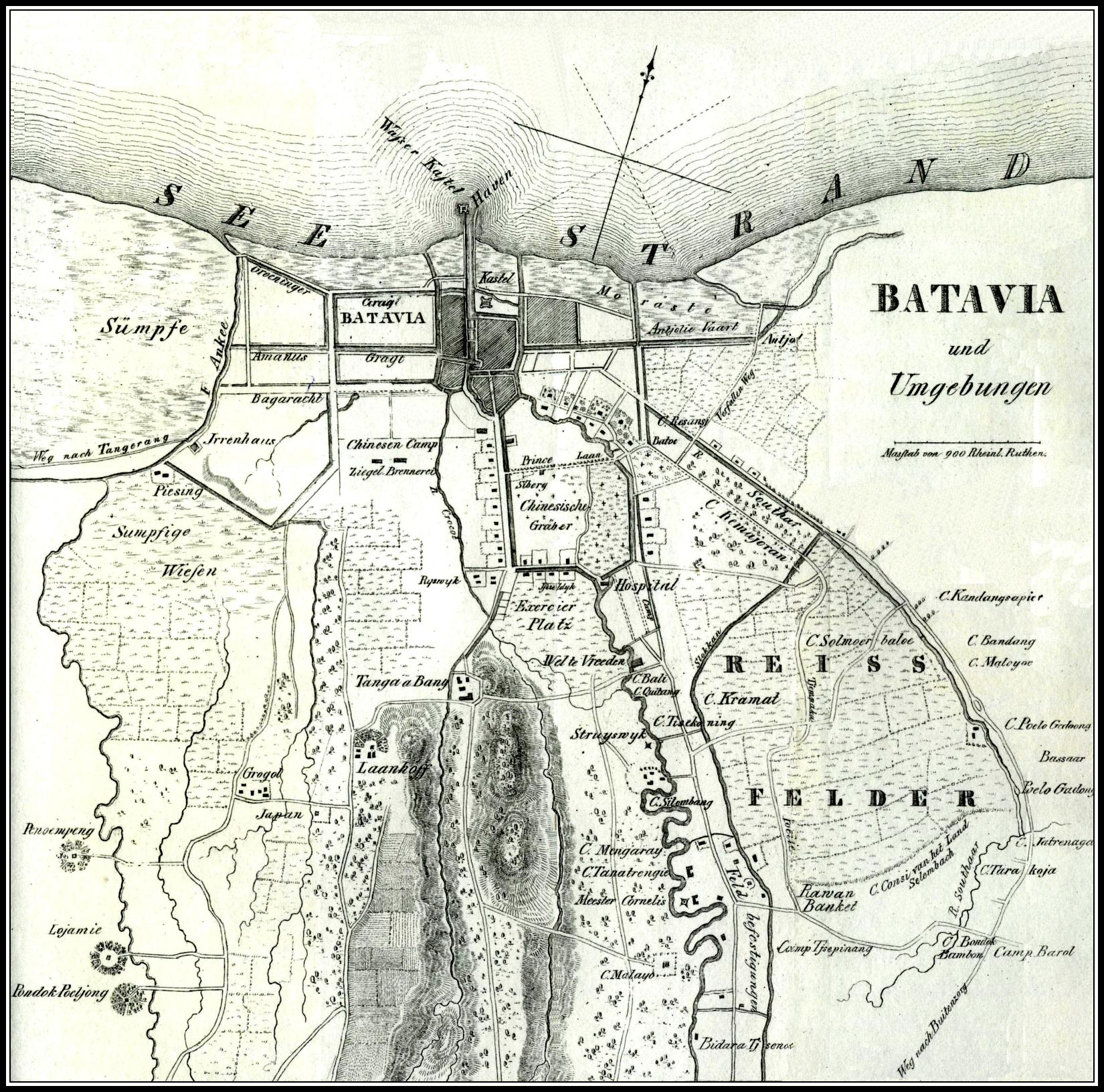
Map of Batavia in 1840. Multiple villas started to appear to the south of the old Batavia.

As the Dutch become more securely established in the region, towns grew up beyond the walls of the fort. Batavia, together with Semarang and Ujung Pandang, were the most important urban centers. During this time, Batavia became congested and wealthier merchants and other powerful men began to build their residences on the outskirts of town and in the surrounding countryside.

The period shows a gradual adaptation to the tropical climate form on the part of the Dutch colonial architecture. These new form of architecture is called Indische Stijl. Typical style during this period include large roof overhang, high roof and ceiling, and front and rear verandahs that opened on to gardens. Indies style can be described as a mix of Indonesian, Chinese, and European influence. Very often the local Javanese style limasan roof was employed, but with addition of 19th-century European architectural elements such as Tuscan columns, doors, windows, and a flight of three to four steps leading up to a verandah running the full width of the house.

Neoclassicism was a popular style for buildings in Jakarta during this period, which is considered to be the best representation of the greatness of the empire.

Last official name	Former names	Year	Architect	Location	Latest image	Oldest image
	Aley Cramerus Residence		anonymous		—	
	C. Schultze Residence		anonymous		—	
	H. Vaupel Residence				—	
	J.J. Kunst Residence		anonymous		—	
	M.C. Westerman Residence		anonymous		—	
	W.C. van Benthem Jutting Residence		anonymous	Kebon Sirih, Weltevreden	—	
All Saints Church	Engelsekerk, Gereja Inggris (original) / Church of the British Protestant Community (BPC) (1843) / All Saints Church (1950)	1828		6°11′00″S 106°50′06″E		
Armenian Church (demolished, now a field within Bank Indonesia Thamrin building)	Armeensche kerk	1831		6°10′51″S 106°49′21″E		
Asrama Polisi Sektor Palmerah	Landhuis Kebayoran Lama / Gedung Tinggi or "tall building" (Note: so called because it was the tallest building in Grogol during the colonial area.) / Rumah Grogol or "Grogol house" / Residence of Andreas Hartink	18th century	W.J. Van de Velde	6°12′26″S 106°47′22″E		
Balai Kota DKI Jakarta	see Jakarta City Hall	19th century	anonymous	6°10′52″S 106°49′44″E		
Biara Santa Ursula, Kapel, dan Sekolah Santa Ursula; "St Ursula cloister, chapel, and school"	Ursulinen Klooster, "Kleine Klooster"	1859 (cloister), 1888 (chapel), 1912 (school)	anonymous	6°10′07″S 106°50′03″E		
Café Batavia (1991)	see Café Batavia	1837		6°08′04″S 106°48′46″E		
Church of Saint Mary Ascend to Heaven (first form) (renovated in 1859)	De Kerk van Onze Lieve Vrouwe ten Hemelopneming (original)	November 6, 1829 (inauguration)	Monseigneur Prinsen (inaugurated)	6°10′08″S 106°49′59″E		
Church of Saint Mary Ascend to Heaven (second form) (collapsed in 1890)	De Kerk van Onze Lieve Vrouwe ten Hemelopneming (original)	1859 (renovation of the earlier form)		6°10′08″S 106°49′59″E		
Citadel Prins Frederik (demolished, on its site stands the Istiqlal Mosque, Jakarta)	Citadel Prins Frederik	1831		6°10′13″S 106°49′51″E		
De Club Burger Societeit (demolished)	Residence (1815, 1819) / Hotel Marine (1833)	1815		6°10′03″S 106°49′13″E		
Dewan Kerajinan Nasional (February 24, 1992)	Residence / Office of Hamengkubuwono IX (1945)	1860–1870	anonymous	Jl. Prapatan No. 42 Kel. Senen, Kec. Senen, Jakarta 10410		
Galeri Nasional Indonesia	See National Gallery of Indonesia	1817	G.C. van Rijk (commissioner?)	6°10′43″S 106°50′00″E		
Gedung A.A. Maramis	Palace of Governor-General Daendels / Het Groote Huis / Het Witte Huis (Note: Material for the building was collected from Kasteel Batavia, dismantled in 1809.)	March 7, 1809	J.C. Schultze, completed by J. Tromp (1828)	6°10′09″S 106°50′14″E		
Gedung Kawedri (1987)	TNI AD Department of Health / TNI Batalyon Kala Hitam headquarter (1949) / Netherlands/Japanese/Allied Civil Defense Department (1942–1949) / Hogere Burger School (1867)/ Gymnasium Koning Willem III School te Batavia (original)	1860 (school established)	anonymous	6°11′56″S 106°51′07″E		
Gedung Kesenian Jakarta	Stadtsschouwburg / Bataviasch Schouwburg / "Gedung Komidi" / Shintsu Tekijō	1821 (Note: The material for the construction of the building were taken from the 17th century Spinhuis in Jakarta Old Town.)	J.C. Schultze	6°10′00″S 106°50′04″E		
Gedung Pancasila, Pancasila Building / Gedung Departemen Luar Negeri or Building of the Ministry of Foreign Affairs	Residence of Hertog Bernhard (original) / residence of Dutch Royal Army Commander / Volksraad or Council of the Indies Building or Raad van Indië (1918) / Dokuritsu Zyunbi Tyoosakai or Badan Penyidik Usaha-Usaha Persiapan Kemerdekaan	1830	J. Tromp	6°10′28″S 106°50′01″E		
Gereja Immanuel, "Emmanuel Church"	Willemskerk or "Williams Church"	1835–1839	J.H. Horst	6°10′36″S 106°49′55″E		
Grand Hôtel Java (Demolished in the 1950s and replaced with Markas besar TNI Angkatan Darat (headquarters of the National Indonesian Army Land Forces))	Private residence (original) / Grand Hôtel Java (1834)	early 19th century	anonymous	6°10′06″S 106°49′42″E		
Hotel des Indes 1st form (renovated in 1930)	a residential / Hotel Chaulan (1828) (Note: established by A. Chaulan and J.J. Didero.) / Hotel de Provence (1835) / Hotel Rotterdamsch (1854) / Hotel des Indes (May 1, 1856)	1930	?	6°09′56″S 106°49′11″E		
Hotel Dharma Nirmala (demolished and replaced with Bina Graha Presidential Office in 1969)	see Hotel der Nederlanden	1794	anonymous	6°10′05″S 106°49′30″E		
Hotel Sriwijaya (1950)	Hotel Cavadino (1863) / Hotel Lion d’Or (1899) / Park Hotel (1941)	1863	for Conrad Alexander Willem Cavadino	6°10′08″S 106°49′47″E		
Hotel Wisse (1891, replaced with Hotel des Galeries in 1920)	Residence of Governor-General Petrus Albertus van der Parra / Hotel Ernst (1860–1891)	around 1750	for Governor-General Petrus Albertus van der Parra	6°10′01″S 106°49′16″E		
Istana Merdeka	Governor General's Palace or Paleis van de Gouverneur-Generaal, "Gambir Palace"	1873	Drossares	6°10′13″S 106°49′27″E		
Istana Negara (1949)	Residence of Jacob Andries van Braam (original); Schonburg Building; Paleis Z. E. Gouverneur Generaal te Rijswijk	1796–1804, 1848 (renovated after an earthquake)	?	6°10′05″S 106°49′26″E		
Sunda Kelapa Lighthouse	Vuurtoren Batavia	1862	anonymous	6°06′18″S 106°48′19″E		
Jean Belle Residence (demolished, replaced with Nederlandsche Handels Maatschappij te Weltevreden in 1910)	Jean Belle Residence		anonymous			
J.P. Coen Statue (demolished on March 7, 1943, during Japanese occupation)	J.P. Coen Statue	1869	anonymous	6°10′10″S 106°50′13″E		
Kimia Farma at Jalan Budi Utomo	Loge nummer 14: ‘De Ster in het Oosten’; Rathkamp Apotheek (early 20th century); "Gedung Setan"	1837 (established), 1858? (probably the date of the building)	anonymous	6°10′04″S 106°50′09″E		
Kimia Farma at Jalan Veteran	Volksapotheek te Rijswijk	1857; 1913 (renovated)	anonymous;	6°10′05″S 106°49′36″E		
Kleedingmagazijn M. De Koning in Noordwijk (Demolished in the 1950s, now Grand Brilliant Palace Restaurant)	Kleedingmagazijn M. De Koning in Noordwijk		anonymous	6°10′02″S 106°49′39″E		
Magazijn Onderlinge Hulp in Noordwijk (demolished, replaced with Kantor Departemen Keuangan RI bagian KPPN (Kantor Pelayanan Perbendaharaan Negara))	Magazijn Onderlinge Hulp in Noordwijk		anonymous	6°10′01″S 106°49′37″E		
Mahkamah Agung or "Indonesia Supreme Court Building"	Hooggerechsgebouw	1828	J.C. Schultze, completed by J. Tromp (1828)	6°10′06″S 106°50′12″E		
Menara Syahbandar	De Uitkijk	1839	anonymous	6°07′39″S 106°48′33″E		
Mesjid Jami Kebon Jeruk or "Kebon Jeruk Mosque"		1786	for Tuan Tschoa (Kapten Tamien Dosol Seeng)	6°09′20″S 106°49′07″E		
De Militaire School te Meester Cornelis, Military School at Meester Cornelis (closed in 1892, demolished. Now stands the Army Department of Research and Development)	De Militaire School te Meester Cornelis	1852 (opened)		6°12′33″S 106°51′36″E		
Military Society Concordia (demolished in the 1960s, now occupied by Gedung A.A. Maramis II Departemen Keuangan)	Military Society Concordia / Kantor Pusar DPR	September 21, 1833 (inauguration); 1836, 1874, 1890 (building extension)	?	6°10′13″S 106°50′16″E		
Museum Nasional, "Museum Gajah"	Bataviaasch Genootschap van Kunsten en Watenschappen, "The Batavian Society of Arts and Science Building"	1864, 1919 (extension)	W.H.F.H. de Raders (BOW, 1864), J. van Hoytema (BOW, 1919)	6°10′35″S 106°49′20″E		
Museum Seni Rupa dan Keramik	Palais van Justitie ("Justice Palace")	1870	W.H.F.H. de Raders (BOW)	6°08′04″S 106°48′51″E		
Museum Sumpah Pemuda	Customs inspection office / Hotel Hersia (until 1951) / Residence (1937–1951) / Sie Kok Liong's Dormitory for students from outside Java (before 1928)	before 1925	anonymous			
Museum Tekstil (1978)	Residence; Headquarter of Barisan Keamanan Rakyat ("Front of People Safety"); Institution for aged people (1947)	19th century	anonymous	6°11′17″S 106°48′35″E		
Office (building collapsed because of structural failure in 2015, demolished)	NV Koninklijke Boekhandel en Drukkerij G Kolff & Co (1860–1921)	Before 1860	anonymous	6°08′03″S 106°48′43″E		
Oger Frères (demolished, replaced with Singer Building in the 1930s)	Oger Frères	1823 (store opened)	anonymous	6°10′05″S 106°49′15″E		
Oude Katholieke Kerk, "Old Catholic Church" (demolished in 1830)		before 1821	anonymous	Weltevreden		
Passer Baroe, Pasar Baru	Passer Baroe	1821	—	6°09′55″S 106°50′05″E		
Percetakan Negara Republik Indonesia, "Indonesian Republic State Printing" ()	Landsdrukkerij (original); Gunseikanbu Inatsu Kojo or GIK (1942–1945); Percetakan Republik Indonesia (1950)		anonymous	6°11′26″S 106°51′23″E		
Perpustakaan Nasional Indonesia at Jalan Medan Merdeka Selatan				6°10′52″S 106°49′37″E		
Photographisch Atelier Walter Woodbury (demolished, replaced by Gedung Bina Graha)	Residence of Van Dorp (original) / Photographisch Atelier Walter Woodbury (1861–1908)	before 1861	anonymous	6°10′04″S 106°49′31″E		
Post- en Telegraafkantoor te Weltevreden	Post- en Telegraafkantoor te Weltevreden	before 1880	anonymous	Postweg (now Jalan Pos)		
Postkantoor Weltevreden (demolished and replaced with a new building in 1913)	Postkantoor Weltevreden	1853	anonymous			
Rumah Cililitan Besar (deteriorated and occupied by squatters by the 90's, now made into shanty homes)	Landhuis Tjililitan	1775	Hendrik van der Crap (owner)	6°16′08″S 106°52′15″E		
Rumah Sakit Cikini or "Cikini hospital"	Raden Saleh Residence (original); Hospital and a Nurse Academy (1898)	1852	Raden Saleh	6°11′28″S 106°50′28″E		
SKAHA (first floor)	Assurantiekantoor Langeveldt – Schröder; Goedang Kakaco (Kerkhoff, Kerstholt & Co., Importeurs)	19th century?	anonymous	6°08′12″S 106°48′44″E		
SMK Santa Maria	Groote Klooster / Mater Dei (1920)	1856	anonymous			
Societeit Harmonie or "Harmony Society (Batavia, Dutch East Indies)" (demolished for road widening and parking area in 1985)	Societeit Harmonie	January 18, 1815 (Note: The construction of the building used the former bricks of the wall of Old Batavia.)	J.C. Schultze	6°10′05″S 106°49′16″E		
Stadsherberg (demolished after 1949)	Stadsherberg	1849	anonymous	6°07′30″S 106°48′35″E		
Topografische Dienst te Weltevreden	Topografische Dienst te Weltevreden		anonymous			
Villa Nova	Villa Nova	Before 1870	anonymous			
Wilhelmina Exposition Pavilion (demolished)	Wilhelmina Exposition Pavilion, Wilhelminapaviljoen	before 1880	anonymous	6°10′12″S 106°50′13″E		
Zoological and Plant Society Main Building (demolished)	Zoological and Plant Society Main Building					

== Post Cultuurstelsel abolition – 1870 to mid 20th century ==
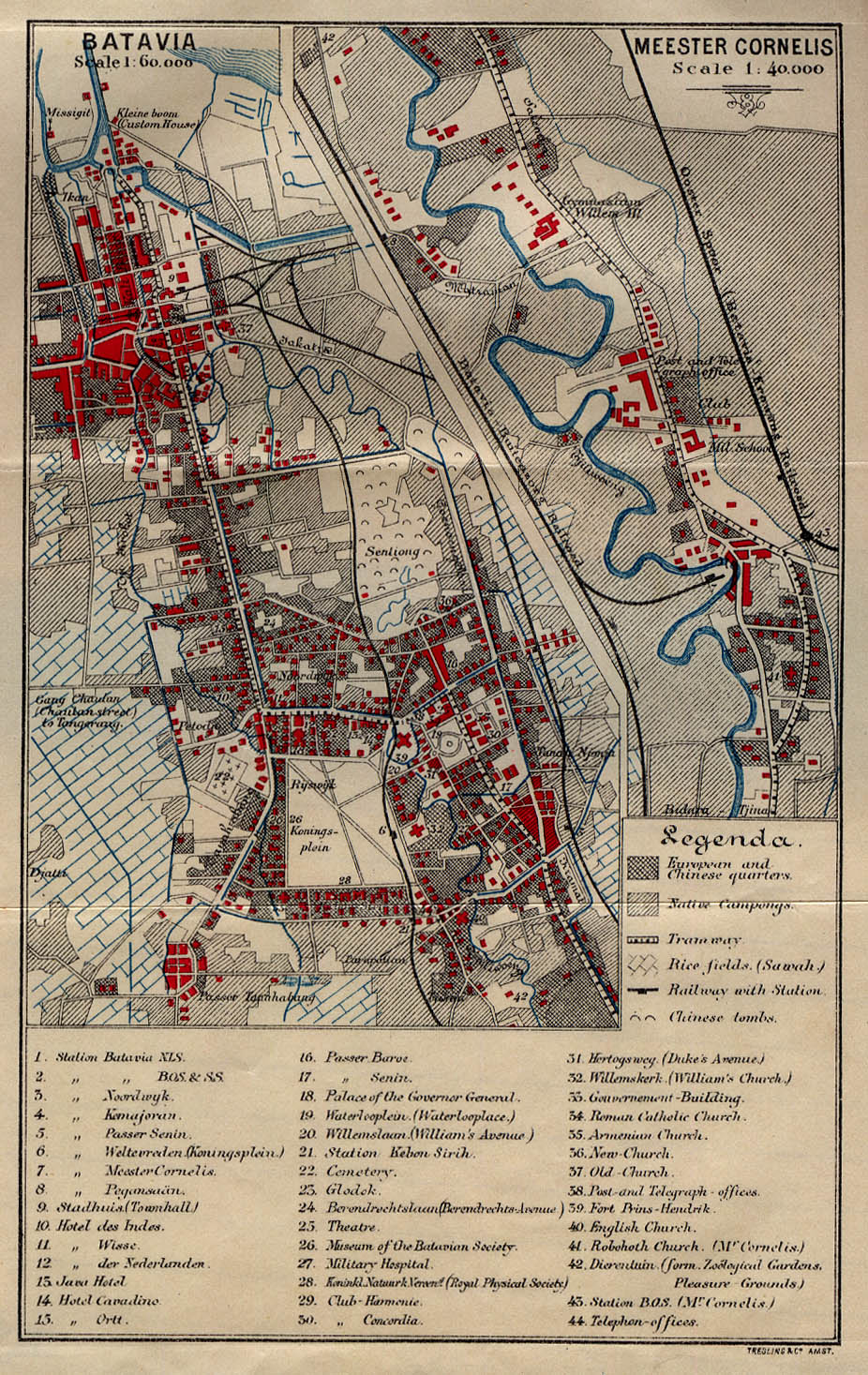
Map of Batavia in 1897

The abolition of the Cultuurstelsel in 1870 made way for the rapid development of private enterprises in the Dutch Indies. Numerous trading companies and financial institutions established themselves in Java, most of them settled in Batavia. Jakarta Old Town's deteriorating structures were replaced with offices, typically along the Kali Besar. These private companies owned or managed plantations, oil fields, and mines. Railway stations were designed during this period, with characteristic style of this period.

Architecturally, neoclassicism fell out of favor to be replaced by Neogothic and Dutch Rationalism. Apparent architectural style were Nieuwe Kunst (e.g. Bank Tabungan Negara), Art Deco or De Stijl, and Amsterdam School. This architecture styles were also the tropical counterpart of the original style, resulting in a style called New Indies Style.

Tree dominant architectural bureaus during this period were AIA Bureau (Frans Ghijsels) and between 1909-1927 Hulswit-Fermont-Cuypers with the Amsterdam architect (Eduard Cuypers) and AA Fermont-Cuypers between 1927-1957. Colonnades are required during this period to provide protection against monsoon rains and tropical sun, which in turn transformed the appearance of buildings in the city centers.

Colonial style in Jakarta lingered some years after the Japanese occupation of Indonesia in 1942, and further after the independence of Indonesia in 1945. The book "Indische Bouwkunst" lists more than 2,000 projects built between 1900 and 1958 - many of which in Jakarta- as well as over 150 architects who designed them. This book has been translated into Bahasa Indonesia and is available as a free download.

Last official name	Former names	Year	Architect	Location	Latest image	Oldest image
	Bioscoop Manggarai or "Manggarai Cinema"					
	Binnacle (Schakelhuis)					
	Frans Consulaat Koningsplein					
	Electrification of the State Railway Company at Meester Cornelis (Electrificatie van de Staatsspoor- en Tramwegen (SS en T) bij het spoorwegstation te Meester Cornelis)			6°07′42″S 106°50′45″E		
	Modernist villas of Westerpark	1938	George Peters			
	Van Arcken and Co. Shop					
Algemeen Delisch Emigratie Kantoor (A.D.E.K.), "General Deli Emigration Office" (demolished, now Inkoppol)	Algemeen Delisch Emigratie Kantoor; internment camp ADEK(1942–1944); Bunsho I Kamp 8 (1944–1945); Relief camp (1945–1946)	1920s?	anonymous	6°12′14″S 106°50′55″E		
Aquarium, Akuarium	Aquarium: Het Instituut voor de Zeevisserij (Dept. v. Econ. Z.) en het Kantoor voor de Prauwvaartaangelegenheden (Dept. v. Econ. Z.).			6°07′33″S 106°48′31″E		
Artesian well at Batoe Toelis (demolished)	Artesian well at Batoe Toelis					
Artesian well at Koningsplein (demolished)	Artesian well at Koningsplein			6°10′18″S 106°49′32″E		
Artesian well at Meester Cornelis (demolished)	Artesian well at Meester Cornelis	1881		Meester Cornelis		
Artesian well at Postweg (demolished)	Artesian well at Postweg					
Artesian well at Salemba (Demolished)	Artesian well at Salemba			6°11′37″S 106°51′00″E		
Asuransi Jasa Indonesia	West Java Handel Maatschappij	1920	Eduard Cuypers en Hulswit-Fermont,	6°08′03″S 106°48′46″E		
Asuransi Jasa Indonesia	De Nederlanden van 1845 (original)	1913	Hendrik Petrus Berlage	6°08′12″S 106°48′48″E		
Asuransi Jiwasraya (1957, original front facade has been demolished for road widening. In 2016, the original front facade was recreated.)	Nillmij	1909–1910	P.A.J. Moojen and S. Snuyf	6°10′01″S 106°49′24″E		
Asuransi Wahana Tata, Wahana Tata Insurance	Office	19th century	unknown	6°08′06″S 106°48′40″E		
Badan Pengawas Tenaga Nuklir (BAPETEN), "Nuclear Energy Regulatory Agency"	Gebouw van Burgerlijke Openbare Werken, Department of Public Works	before 1920		6°09′50″S 106°49′11″E		
Bahtera Jaya Ancol	Jachtclub Tandjong Priok / Koninklijke Bataviasche Jachtclub / Kodja Bataviasche Yacht Club / Badan Keamanan Rakyat Laut headquarter	1926	J. Jiskoot	6°06′44″S 106°51′50″E		
Bank Mandiri – Jakarta Pintu Besar	Nederlandsch Indische Escompto-Maatschappij te Javabankstraat (1920) / Escomptobank NV (June 30, 1949) / Bank Dagang Negara (1960)	1920-1921	Van den Berg en Pichel	6°08′11″S 106°48′46″E		
Bank Mandiri	Nederlandsch Indische Escompto Maatschappij te Noordwijk	1924	Th. Taen, Hulswit-Fermont-Cuypers	6°10′00″S 106°49′32″E		
Bank Mandiri	Chartered Bank of India, Australia, and China / Bank Umum Negara (1965) / Bank Bumi Daya (1968)	1920-February 27, 1921	Eduard Cuypers, Hulswit-Fermont.	6°08′12″S 106°48′41″E		
Bank Mandiri – Jakarta-Kota branch	Bank Export Import / Bank Bumi Daya (1960) / Nederlandsch-Indische Handelsbank, Binnen Nieuwpoortstraat (1940)	April 1937 (start), May 25, 1940 (opened)	Wolff Schoemaker, assistant architect Ir. J.F.L. Blankenberg	6°08′13″S 106°48′49″E		
Bank Sinarmas	NV. Handelsvereniging / NV. Reiss & Co	1914	Ed. Cuypers, M.J. Hulswit.	6°08′09″S 106°48′41″E		
Bank Tabungan Negara Office (1968)	Kantoor van de Postspaarbank (1920) / Chokin Kyoku (1942) / Bank Tabungan Pos (1945)	1920, 1936 (renovated to current form)	RLA Schoenmaker (1920), J. van Gendt (1936)	6°10′02″S 106°49′13″E		
Banteng Building – Kantor Advokat dan Pengacara	N.V. Gebr. Sutorius & Co. Handel Maatschappij (before 1932)	19th century	anonymous	6°08′10″S 106°48′41″E		
Bappenas or "Board of National Planning and Development"	Loge "Adhuc Stat", 1858? (probably the date of the building)	1925	Frans Ghijsels (AIA Bureau)	6°12′02″S 106°49′57″E		
Bengkel Praktek Kerja Pendidikan Teknik (1974)	Nederlandsch Indie Gas Maatschappij	1924		Jl. Budi Utomo No. 3 Kel. Pasar Baru Kec. Sawah Besar Jakarta 10710		
Bhanda Graha Reksa	Offices administratiekantoor Tiedeman & van Kerchem and associated firms (Note: Firma TIEDEMAN & VAN KERCHEM / – N.V. Assurantie Maatschappij "De Nederlanden van 1845". FATUM. LABOR. / NEDERLANDSCH-INDISCHE Zee- en Brand Assurantie Maatschappij / TWEEDE NEDERLANDSCH-INDISCHE Zee- en Brand Assurantie Maatschappij / KOLONIALE Zee- en Brand Assurantie Maatschappij / TWEEDE KOLONIALE Zee- en Brand Assurantie Maatschappij / Zee- en Brand Assurantie Maatschappij "De Oosterling" / N.V. Cult. Mij. Bodjong Datar / N.V. Landb. Mij. Dajeuh Manggoeng / N.V. Cult. Mij. Gandasoli / N.V. The Indo Java Rubber Planting & Trading Cy. / N.V. Cult. Mij. Juliana / N.V. Landb. Mij. Kertamanah / N.V. Lebak Plantations Cy. Ltd. / N.V. Marywattie Tea Cy./ N.V. Landb. Mij. Radjamandala / N.V. Cult. Mij. Takokak / N.V. Cult. Mij. Tandjong Oost / N.V. Landb. Mij. Tjiletab / N.V. Bombay Java Trading Cy.)	1922–1923	L.M. van den Berg & J.J. Groenema	6°08′10″S 106°48′44″E		
Bioscoop Menteng (demolished in 1988, on its site stands Menteng Plaza)	Bioscoop Menteng	1949-1950 (opened)	Han Groenewegen (Selle, De Bruyn, Reyerse & de Vries)	6°11′00″S 106°50′03″E		
Garuda Building, Ministry of Foreign Affairs	Volksraad or Council of the Indies Building or Raad van Indië (1918); Dokuritsu Junbi Chōsakai or Badan Penyidik Usaha-Usaha Persiapan Kemerdekaan; BP7 Building (1980–1998)	1927	E. Kühr	6°10′31″S 106°49′59″E		
Building at Jl. Kunir no. 2	Geo. Wehry & Co Office building	1925–1928	A.I.A	6°07′57″S 106°48′53″E		
Canisius College	Canisius College AMS	1927 Opening January 11, 1930	Th. Taen, Fermont-Cuypers	6°11′09″S 106°50′03″E		
Carl Schlieper Gebouw (destroyed by fire on December 17, 1920, on its site was built de Factorij)	Carl Schlieper Gebouw	1911	M.J. Hulswit.	6°08′17″S 106°48′47″E		
Cipta Niaga	Zee en Brand Assurantie / Gebouw van de Internationale Credit en Handelsvereeniging Rotterdam / Tjipta Niaga / Perusahaan Negara Aneka Niaga (ca. 1964)	May 25, 1912	Eduard Cuypers, M.J. Hulswit	6°08′04″S 106°48′43″E		
Departemen Energi dan Sumber Daya Mineral, "Department of Energy and Mineral Resources"	'De Koloniale', N.K.P.M, K.P.V.M, Socony. Batavia Police Headquarter	1938	Th. Nix, Fermont-Cuypers.	6°10′53″S 106°49′25″E		
Département Keuangan, "Department of Monetary"	Ika-Daigaku Dormitory	1942		Jl. Prapatan No. 10, Kel. Senen, Kec. Senen, Jakarta 10410		
Departemen Pertahanan dan Keamanan, "Department of Defense and Security" (1964)	Rechts Hoge School	1924	J.F. van Hoytema	6°10′38″S 106°49′19″E		
Djakarta Lloyd Office (abandoned)	Asurantie Kantoor van Ongevallen verzekering mij FATUM en Onderlinge elvensverzekering van EIGEN HULP / Honda (2004)	1890		6°08′03″S 106°48′45″E		
Eigen Hulp aan de Molenvliet West (replaced with Postspaarbank office in 1920)	Eigen Hulp aan de Molenvliet West	1897		6°10′02″S 106°49′13″E		
Fakultas Kedokteran Universitas Indonesia, "Medical Faculty of the University of Indonesia"	de Geneeskundige Hoogeschool, "Medical College" / School Tot Opleiding Van Inlandse Artsen (STOVIA)	1919–1926	Dienst B.O.W./H. von Essen	6°11′42″S 106°50′56″E		
Filateli Jakarta	Main Post and Telegraph Office	1913 new front 1921	J.F. van Hoytema	6°10′02″S 106°50′02″E		
Former office of Nederlandsch Indische Handelsbank (NIHB)	First office of Nederlandsch Indische Handelsbank (NIHB)			6°07′59″S 106°48′38″E		
Galeri Melaka, PT Perusahaan Perdagangan Indonesia	N.V. Trading Company Deli – Aceh; Previously Borneo Company	1923	Hulswit-Fermont-Cuypers	6°08′13″S 106°48′37″E		
Galeri Nasional Indonesia, Gedung B	Bataviaasch Lyceum (See National Gallery of Indonesia)	1914	M.J. Hulswit	6°10′41″S 106°49′58″E		
Gebouw van de Koninklijke Paketvaart-Maatschappij (KPM) bij de Sluisbrug (Demolished for road widening)	Gebouw van de Koninklijke Paketvaart-Maatschappij (KPM) bij de Sluisbrug	1888	anonymous	6°10′04″S 106°49′53″E		
GKI Kwitang	Gereformeerde Kerk Kwitang	1924	J. Abell, W.F. Pichel	6°10′53″S 106°50′19″E		
HAKA Restaurant	Bataviaasch Nieuwsblad newspaper	1927	Frans Ghijsels	6°09′56″S 106°49′54″E		
Kementerian Dalam Negeri, The Ministry of Home Affairs (demolished after 1960)	Binnenlands Bestuur	1912–1915	J.F. van Hoytema	6°10′09″S 106°49′42″E		
Kementerian Koordinator Bidang Pembangunan Manusia dan Kebudayaan Republik Indonesia, Coordinating Ministry for Human Development and Culture of the Republic of Indonesia	Passagekantoor van de Rotterdamse Lloyd en de Stoomvaart Maatschappij Nederland	1930	Th. Taen, Fermont-Cuypers.	6°10′20″S 106°49′21″E		
Koperasi Jiwasraya	Der Levensverzekering Mij. Dordrecht te Weltevreden	1913	Ed. Cuypers & M.J. Hulswit te Weltevreden	6°10′02″S 106°49′18″E		
Gereja Katedral Jakarta (final form)	De Kerk van Onze Lieve Vrowe ten Hemelopneming (original)	1901	Antonius Dijkmans, M.J. Hulswit.	6°10′08″S 106°49′59″E		
Gereja Koinonia	GPIB Bethel Jemaat Djatinegara (1961) / Bethelkerk (original)	March 28, 1889		6°12′50″S 106°51′43″E		
Gereja Pniel (1953)	"Gereja Ayam" ("Chicken Church") / Haantjes Kerk	1913–1915 (replacing earlier church built in 1850)	Eduard Cuypers, M.J. Hulswit	6°09′39″S 106°50′03″E		
Gereja St Paulus (October 31, 1948)	See St. Paul's Church, Jakarta	1936	Frans Ghijsels (AIA Bureau)	6°12′02″S 106°49′53″E		
Gereja St Yoseph Matraman, "St. Joseph's Church"	St. Joseph Church Matraman	1906 – June 22, 1909 or 1924	Frans Ghijsels (AIA Bureau); Ir Erawan Kartawidjaja (renovation in 2001)	6°12′30″S 106°51′35″E		
Gereja St Theresia, "St. Theresia's Church"	Theresiakerk	1934	J.Th. van Oyen	6°11′20″S 106°49′32″E		
GKI Pinangsia, "Pinangsia Church"	Geredja Keristen Tionghoa	April 11, 1952 (opening)		6°08′27″S 106°48′59″E		
Pasar Glodok main building	Hoofdgebouw Pasar Glodok	1920	B.J.K. Cramer	6°08′35″S 106°48′52″E		
Hotel Duta Indonesia (demolished in 1972, replaced with Duta Merlin Plaza)	Hotel des Indes	1930	F. Ghijsels, N.E. van Burhoven Jaspers AIA	6°09′56″S 106°49′11″E		
Hotel Melati	Hotel des Galeries	1932	A. Dikstaal, Th. Nix, Fermont-Cuypers.	6°10′01″S 106°49′16″E		
Jasa Raharja	Zee en Brand Verzekerings Maatschapij Sluyters & Co / Assurantiekantoor Blom & Van der Aa, Assurantiekantoor Combinatie Sluyters & Co, and de Java-China-Japan Lijn. / Lloyd Insurance (1950)	1913	P.J. Moojen	6°08′08″S 106°48′44″E		
Kantor Pelayanan Pajak Jakarta Tambora, "Tambora Tax Office"	Hongkong Shanghai Bank. HSBC	1910–1911	Eduard Cuypers and M.J. Hulswit.	6°08′08″S 106°48′40″E		
Kantor Pos Cikini, "Cikini Post Office"	Tjikini post kantoor	Before the 1920s	anonymous	6°11′14″S 106°50′12″E		
Kantor Pos Kota, "Kota Post Office"	Post- en telegraaf kantoor aan het Stadhuisplein	1929	R. Baumgartner	6°08′02″S 106°48′48″E		
Kerta Niaga (1966)	MUCH: Maatschappij voor Uitvoer en Commissiehandel	1915	Eduard Cuypers and Hulswit	6°08′09″S 106°48′44″E		
Komite Nasional Keselamatan Transportasi – Departemen Perhubungan, "National Committee on Sea Transportation Safety, Ministry of Transportation"	Koninklijke Paketvaart-Maatschappij (original) / Japanese Marine Department (1942)	1916–1918	Frans Ghijsels (AIA Bureau)	6°10′30″S 106°49′51″E		
Kunstkring Art Gallery	Bataviasche Kunstkring. see Kunstkring Art Gallery	1913	P.A.J. Moojen	6°11′20″S 106°50′01″E		
Lembaga Biologi Molekul Eijkman, Eijkman Institute for Molecular Biology	Eijkman Instituut	1914 (built), 1916 (inauguration)	H von Essen	6°11′53″S 106°50′47″E		
Lembaga Pendidikan Jurnalistik Antara, "Antara Institute of Journalism"	see Gedung Antara	1920	Reyerse & De Vries	6°09′57″S 106°50′02″E		
Mesjid Cut Mutiah (1987)	N.V. de Bouwploeg (original) / post office, Train Company (1942–1945) / office of Home and Religion (1964–1970).	1922	P.A.J. Moojen	6°11′14″S 106°50′00″E		
Metropole	Bioscoop Metropol / Megaria	1932	Liauw Goan Sing	6°12′00″S 106°50′37″E		
Michiels Monument (demolished between 1942 and 1945)	Michiels Monument	mid 19th century		6°10′16″S 106°50′00″E		
Monument voor de Slag bij Waterloo (demolished)	Monument voor de Slag bij Waterloo					
Monument for J.B. van Heutsz (demolished in 1960)	Monument for J.B. van Heutsz	1927–1932	W. Dudok (architect), H. van den Eijnde (sculptor)	6°11′13″S 106°50′03″E		
Museum Joang '45 (1975)	Hotel Schomper; Ganseikanbu Sendenbu (1942–1945) / Asrama Angkatan Baroe Indonesia / Gedung Menteng 31	1920s		6°11′10″S 106°50′12″E		
Museum Kebangkitan Nasional, "Museum of the History of National Awakening"	STOVIA	1899–1902		6°10′43″S 106°50′17″E		
Museum Bank Indonesia	De Javasche Bank	1909, extensions 1924–1928 / new frontbuilding 1937	Eduard Cuypers, M.J. Hulswit / Fermont-Cuypers.	6°08′14″S 106°48′46″E		
Museum Bank Mandiri	See Bank Mandiri Museum	1932	J.J. de Bruyn, A.P. Smits and C. van der Linde	6°08′17″S 106°48′47″E		
Museum Sasmita Loka Ahmad Yani	residence of Ahmad Yani / residence	1930		6°12′16″S 106°50′11″E		
Museum Taman Prasasti	Europese Kerkhof			6°10′20″S 106°49′08″E		
Museum Wayang	Museum of Old Batavia (1939); Geo Wehry & Co Warehouse	1912		6°08′06″S 106°48′45″E		
Nederlandsche Handels Maatschappij te 22 Noordwijk (Demolished in 1984, replaced with Kantor Departemen Keuangan RI bagian KPPN (Kantor Pelayanan Perbendaharaan Negara))	Nederlandsche Handels Maatschappij te 22 Noordwijk / "Factorij"	1910	Eduard Cuypers, M.J.Hulswit.	6°10′01″S 106°49′39″E		
Office building at Jl. Taman Fatahillah no. 2	Gebouw West Java (WEVA)	1920	Hulswit-Fermont-Cuypers.	Jl. Taman Fatahillah No. 2 Kel. Penjaringan, Kec. Taman Sari Jakarta Barat		
Old City Club	Het Nieuws van den Dag (original) / Asuransi Ikrar Lloyd / Athena Discothèque	1925–1927	Reyerse de Vries architecten- en ingeniersbedrijf / Ir. W. Selle	6°08′07″S 106°48′40″E		
Oranje Brouwerij (demolished, now Kompleks Rukan Puri DeltaMas Bandengan)	Archipel Brouwerij	1933	N.E. van Burhoven Jaspers.	6°08′16″S 106°47′57″E		
Pancoran Tea House	Apotheek Chung Hwa	1928	unknown; PT Pembangunan Kota Tua Jakarta (JOTRC) and Jakarta Endowment for Arts & Heritage (JEFORAH) (restoration and alteration in 2015)	6°08′32″S 106°48′53″E		
Pasar Gambir Market Structures/Pavilions (demolished)	Pasar Gambir Market Structures/Pavilions	1924, 1932	J.H. Antonisse.	6°10′44″S 106°49′33″E		
Pasar Ikan	Pasar Ikan, Gemeentelijke Vismarkt	1926	H.A. Bond & R.A. Ogilvie	6°07′35″S 106°48′32″E		
Pelayaran Bahtera Adhiguna	The Ships Agency Ltd Office	19th century		6°08′08″S 106°48′44″E		
Pertamina headquarter (1957), front section is rented to Bank Mandiri.	Batavia Petroleum Maatschappij (original); Japanese Military Headquarter; General Staff of the Army (before 1950)	1937–1938	Th.C.Nix, Fermont-Cuypers	6°10′22″S 106°49′51″E		
Perusahaan Listrik Negara, State Electricity Company	Kantoor van Nederlandsch Indie Gas Maatschappij (1897)	1907	A. van Driesum, M.J. Hulswit.	6°10′50″S 106°49′58″E		
Rathkamp and Co. Pharmacy (demolished after 1948)	Rathkamp and Co. Pharmacy	1912	Eduard Cuypers, M.J. Hulswit.	6°10′08″S 106°49′16″E		
Rumah Sakit PELNI Petamburan, "PELNI Petamburan Hospital"	KPM Petamboeran Hospital	1914–1915, 1920 (extension)	Frans Ghijsels	6°11′35″S 106°48′13″E		
Rumah Sakit Umum Dr. Cipto Mangunkusumo, "Cipto Mangunkusumo General Hospital"	Medicinal warehouse for the Ministry of Health of the Dutch Colonial Government / Teaching Hospital (1919); Het Centrale Burgerlijke Hospitaal (CBZ) or "Central Civil Hospital of Batavia"; Ika-daigaku Byōin (1942–1945)	1919–1926	J. van Hoytema, B.O.W.	6°11′50″S 106°50′51″E		
Samudera Indonesia Commercial Fleet Division (Breakbulk & NVOCC) office building	Maintz & Co Office	1920s	F.J.L. Ghijsels	6°07′59″S 106°48′38″E		
Nitour Building	Singer and Nitour Travel Agency Building (early 1950s)	1938	C. Th. Nix, Fermont-Cuypers	6°10′05″S 106°49′15″E		
SMK Santa Maria	Koningin Emma School	20th century				
St. Aloysius Broederschool (demolished, on its site stands carpark of Pertamina Headquarter)	St. Aloysius Broederschool	1908 (construction)	P.A.J. Moojen	6°10′24″S 106°49′51″E		
Stasiun Jatinegara	Station Meester Cornelis	1910	S. Snuyf	6°12′55″S 106°52′13″E		
Stasiun Gambir 2nd form (post-independence)	Station Weltevreden (1884); Station Koningsplein (1937)	1927	anonymous	6°10′36″S 106°49′50″E		
Stasiun Jakarta Kota	Spoorwegstation Batavia	1926	Frans Ghijsels	6°08′16″S 106°48′52″E		
Stasiun Manggarai	Station Manggarai	1918	J.van Gendt	6°12′36″S 106°51′01″E		
Stasiun Pasar Senen	Station Pasar Senen	1916, March 19, 1925 (inauguration)	J. van Gendt, for Staats Spoorwegen (SS)	6°10′27″S 106°50′40″E		
Stasiun Tanjung Priuk	Spoorwegstation Tandjongpriok	1914	C.W. Koch.	6°06′38″S 106°52′53″E		
Station Koningsplein 1st form (renovated into current form in 1927)	Station Weltevreden (1884)	1884		6°10′36″S 106°49′50″E		
Station Batavia Zuid (demolished)	Station Batavia Zuid		anonymous			
Station Tandjong Priok (demolished in 1917)	Station Tandjong Priok	1885	anonymous	6°06′40″S 106°52′51″E		
Taman Kehormatan Belanda Menteng Pulo or "Menteng Pulo Netherlands Field of Honour"	Ereveld Menteng Poelo	1947; Simultaankerk, columbarium in 1950	H. van Oerle from Royal Netherlands Engineers	6°13′22″S 106°50′23″E		
Topografisch Bureau (abandoned and destroyed)	Topografisch Bureau	1868, 1907 (older building demolished and replaced)				
The Hermitage Hotel, Menteng	Telefoongebouw Menteng (original) / Departement van Onderwijs en Eredienst / Office of the Central Indonesian National Committee or KNIP (1945–1946) / National Education Ministry (1950) / Department of Education and Culture (1968–1996)	1923–1924	J. van Hoytema, B.O.W.	6°11′53″S 106°50′17″E		
Telefoonkantoor aan het Koningsplein (demolished)	Telefoonkantoor aan het Koningsplein	circa 1924	J. van Hoytema, B.O.W.	6°07′53″S 106°48′38″E		
Toko Tio Tek Hong	Toko Tio Tek Hong	1902	owned by Tio Tek Hong	6°10′02″S 106°49′54″E		
Toshiba Office	John Peet & Co Office	around 1920	Ir. FJL Ghijsels	6°08′00″S 106°48′38″E		
Unie Gebouw (demolished)	Unie Gebouw			6°09′47″S 106°49′14″E		
Vereniging Toeristenverkeer – Official Tourist Bureau (demolished)	Vereniging Toeristenverkeer te Rijswijk – Official Tourist Bureau	1910		6°10′04″S 106°49′22″E		
Vliegstationgebouw Tjililitan (demolished)	Vliegstationgebouw Tjililitan	1928	H.A.Breuning			
Airport Kemayoran (dysfunction)	Luchthaven Kemajoran (older structure demolished and replaced)	1938				
Warehouse (abandoned)	Dasaad Musin Concern / Residence of the Director of NV. Pabrik Tenoen Kantjil Mas, Bangil, Djawa Timoer / Gebouw Mercurius	1920	Vromans	6°08′02″S 106°48′46″E		
Wilhelmina Park Atjeh Monument (demolished in the 1950s, on its site stand the Istiqlal Mosque, Jakarta)	Wilhelmina Park Atjeh Monument	1880–1882	Bart van Hove, Pierre Cuypers	6°10′06″S 106°49′51″E		

== See also ==
- History of Jakarta
- Dutch Indies country houses
- New Indies Style
- Colonial architecture of Indonesia
- Dutch colonial architecture

== Notes and references ==
Notes

== Cited works ==
- Akihary, Huib (1990). Architectuur & Stedebouw in Indonesië 1870/1970. Zutphen: De Walburg Pers. ISBN 90-72691-02-4.
- Brommer, Bea (1998). Gunawan Tjahjono (ed.). Batavia: the Realisation of an Ideal City. Indonesian Heritage - Architect. Vol. 6. Singapore: Archipelago Press. ISBN 981-3018-30-5.
- Élan Kooy, Michelle (2008). RELATIONS OF POWER, NETWORKS OF WATER: GOVERNING URBAN WATERS, SPACES, AND POPULATIONS IN (POST)COLONIAL JAKARTA. Vancouver: The University of British Columbia.
- Gill, Ronald (1998). Gunawan Tjahjono (ed.). Country Houses in the 18th Century. Indonesian Heritage - Architect. Vol. 6. Singapore: Archipelago Press. ISBN 981-3018-30-5.
- "Het Gebouw der Levensverzekering Mij. Dordrecht, aan Noordwijk te Weltevreden". Het Nederlands Indische Huis Oud & Nieuw 1915. II (I). 1915.
- Het Indische bouwen: architectuur en stedebouw in Indonesie : Dutch and Indisch architecture 1800-1950. Helmond: Gemeentemuseum Helmond. 1990.
- Merrillees, Scott (2000). Batavia in Nineteenth Century Photographs. Singapore: Editions Didier Millet. ISBN 9789813018778.
- Merrillees, Scott (2015). Jakarta: Portraits of a Capital 1950-1980. Jakarta: Equinox Publishing. ISBN 978-602839730-8.
- Norbruis, Obbe (2020). Landmarks from a bygone era, Life and work of Ed. Cuypers & Hulswit-Fermont 1897-1927. Volendam: LM Publishers. ISBN 9789460220128.
- Norbruis, Obbe (2020). Architecture from the Indonesian Past, Life and work of Fermont-Cuypers 1927-1957. Volendam: LM Publishers. ISBN 9789460220159.
- Norbruis, Obbe (2021). Indische Bouwkunst, architecten en hun oeuvre in Nederlands-Indië en Indonesië in de eerste helft van de 20ste eeuw. Volendam: LM Publishers. ISBN 9789460220296.
- Norbruis, Obbe (2022). Arsitektur di Nusantara, Para Arsitek dan Karya Mereka di Hindia-Belanda dan Indonesia pada Paruh Pertama Abad ke-20. Download free www.heritage-hands-on.org/projects.
- Teeuwen, Dirk (2011). Batavia's Wilhelmina Park – Jakarta's Mosque Istiqlal. Archived from the original on May 4, 2017.
- Windoro Adi (2010). Batavia, 1740: menyisir jejak Betawi [Batavia, 1740: sweeping up the footsteps of Betawi] (in Indonesian). Jakarta: PT Gramedia Pustaka Utama. ISBN 978-979-22-5451-8.
