= Waterkasteel (Batavia) =

Northernmost fortification of Batavia, Dutch East Indies

Coordinates: 6.116205°S 106.806601°E

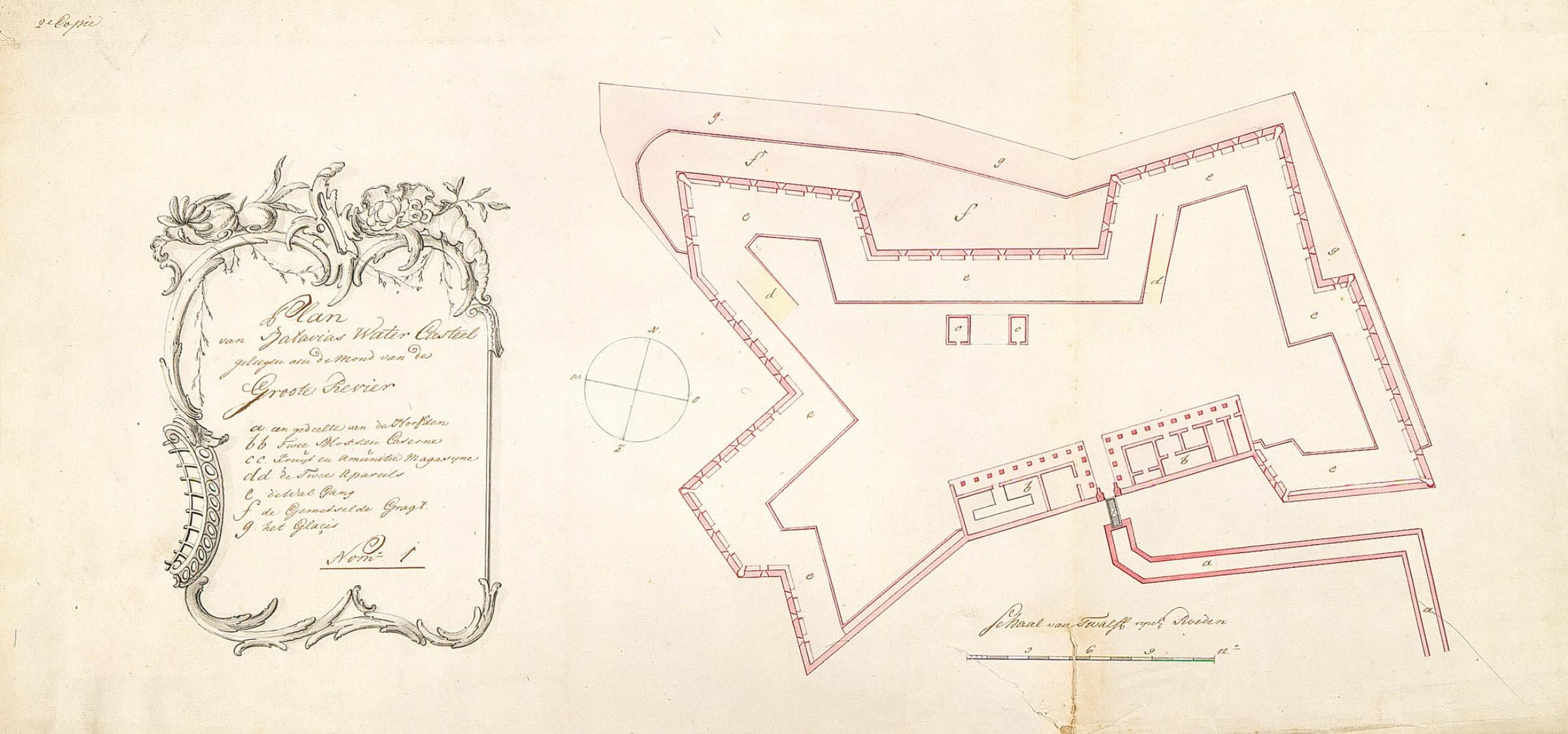
The first layout of the Waterkasteel of Batavia.

Waterkasteel (Dutch "Water Fortress") was the northernmost defense of Batavia (now Jakarta), Dutch East Indies. It was located on the west end of the Sunda Kelapa pier. Because of its location, the fort was also known as "Hornwerk".

== History ==
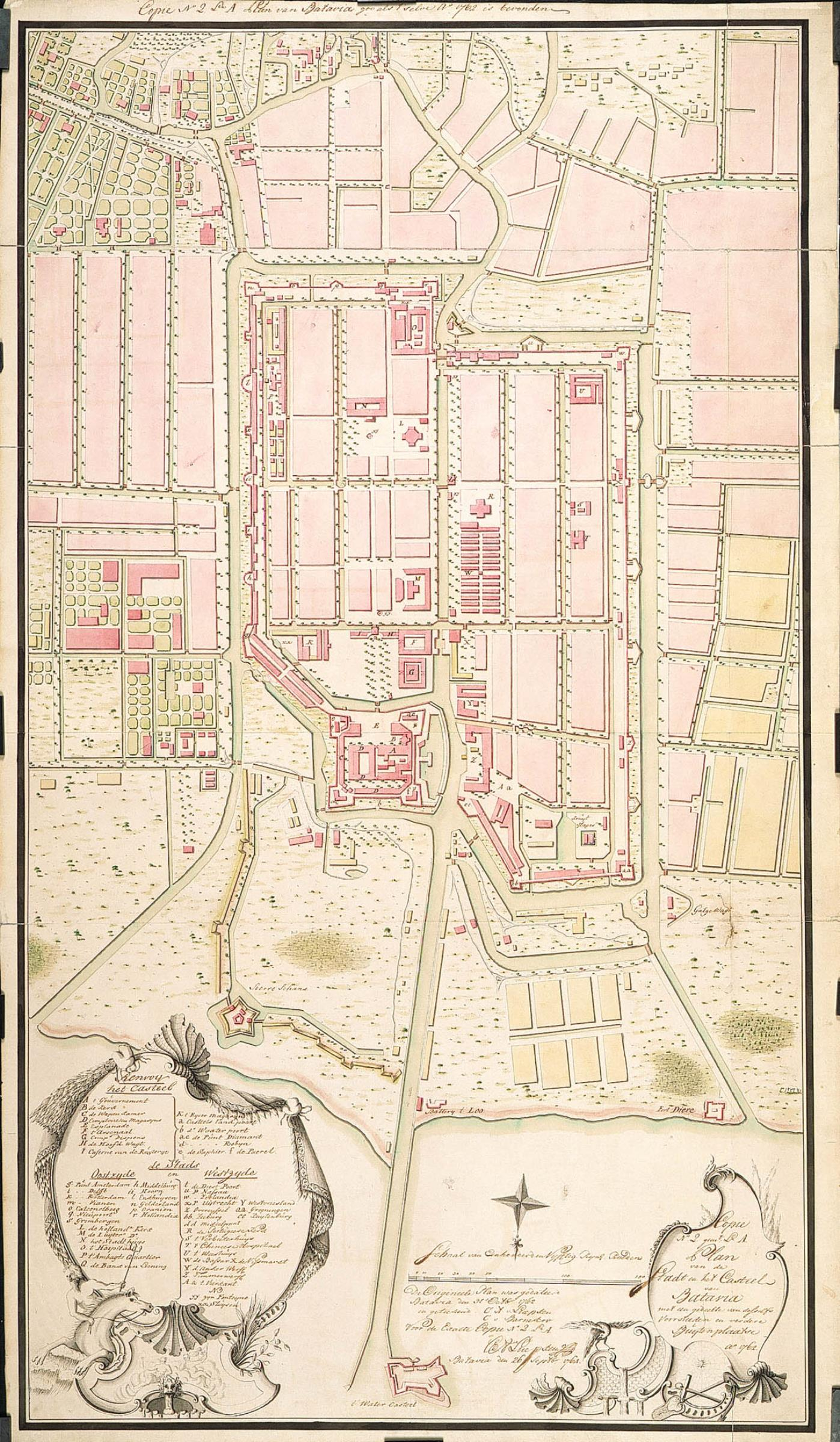
The location of the Waterkasteel is visible in the bottom of the map of 18th-century Batavia.

The objective of this fortress construction was to provide defense at the entrance of Ciliwung because the anchor points had been moved far away from the fortress due to the formation of shoals in front of the estuary and the widening of the coastline. Construction of the fortress began in 1741, improvements were made later on. In 1745, the fortress was laid on a foundation made of hull-remains soaked in mud. This foundation was not strong enough to hold the fortress walls, and therefore in 1750 this structure was refurbished and reconstructed.

In 1776 it was decided to demolish the Waterkasteel. In 1819, the last vestiges of the Waterkasteel was demolished.

== Construction ==
The Waterkasteel fortress, alternatively called "Hornwerk", is a relatively small fortress of approximately 142.9 meter in length and 101.5 meter in width. It was made of coral reef, equipped with barracks, armed forces, and a number of cannon. There were 50 spots for cannons along the top of the fortress wall and eight semi-circular lookout towers, which was called "Rondeel" by local missionary pastor, Johan Maurits Mohr. The fortress contains no buildings. The fort is connected to the mainland by a bridge on the south side of the fortress, This entrance is actually an extension of the west pier embankment (Ciliwung River Embankment). On the southeast bastion, there are two rectangular plots identified as having been the fortress commander's residence and the troop barracks.

== See also ==
- List of colonial buildings and structures in Jakarta
- List of forts
