= Stadsherberg, Batavia =

Stadsherberg (City Inn)
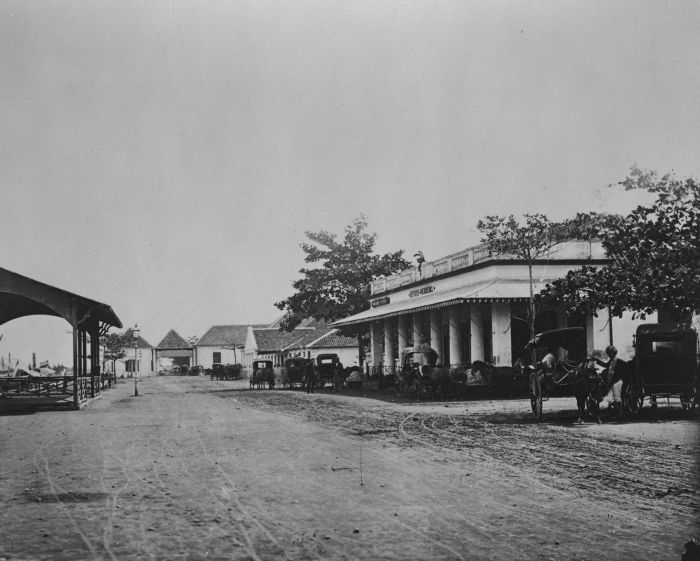
- The Stadsherberg inn with the Kleine Boom at the background

- Location within Jakarta Location within Indonesia

General information
- Status: Demolished
- Type: Inn, tavern, office
- Architectural style: Indies Empire style
- Location: Batavia, Dutch East Indies
- Coordinates: 6°07′30″S 106°48′35″E
- Completed: 1849
- Demolished: after 1949

Design and construction
- Architect: anonymous

The Stadsherberg ("City Inn") is a lodging located in Batavia, Dutch East Indies (now Jakarta). The lodging is located in the Sunda Kelapa harbor, the first lodging to be seen by visitors of Batavia. The lodging was so strategically located in the port of Sunda Kelapa between the colonial custom houses that the inn prospered during the course of the 19th century. The inn went into a decline following the construction of the larger Tanjung Priok harbor. It was demolished after 1949.

== History ==
=== Golden years ===
The Stadsherberg was built in 1849. Construction of the Stadsherberg was initiated by H.S. van Hogezand who sensed a business opportunity when the Kleine Boom was relocated from the western bank of the canal to the eastern bank on February 1, 1848. Van Hogezand had owned and run a smaller inn near the same location since 1820 and obviously realized that all passengers arriving or departing through the Kleine Boom would be passing right in front of his door. Van Hogezand asked a permission to build larger premises to the colonial government. He received a temporary building permit in a letter dated July 24, 1849. Final approval was granted on September 2, including a permit for the operation of a carriage hire business (delmans or sados) from the inn into Batavia.

The Stadsherberg prospered since he established it. From 1850, he earned an additional 200 guilders a month from his new premises by leasing out a small room on the north side of the building to an Englishman J. Parker, who operated a ship supplies business called the "Marine Stores". The Stadsherberg was so lucrative that van Hogezand sold the premise to J.F. Tentee in 1852. The money he used to buy the Hotel der Nederlanden.

On June 1, 1852, the Groote Boom ("Large Custom Post") was relocated to the eastern bank of the canal as well. As a result, more traffic passed by the front door of the Stadsherberg.

The introduction of steamships, the opening of the Suez Canal in 1869 and the greater opportunities for private enterprise in the Indies after 1870 contributed to more passengers passing back and forth through the Kleine Boom in front of the Stadsherberg. The location of the inn was so strategic that the first letterbox in Batavia was placed very close to it in 1863.

=== Decline ===
Following the completion of the new port at Tanjung Priok in 1885 means that there is a dramatic decline of the passenger traffic through the old Sunda Kelapa harbor. By 1914, the Stadsherberg was acquired by Ong Tek Hin and was converted into a store house. In 1949, the building still existed. Afterwards, the building was demolished on an unknown date.

== See also ==
- List of colonial buildings and structures in Jakarta

== Cited works ==
- Heuken, Adolf; Pamungkas, Grace (2000). Galangan Kapal Batavia Selama Tiga Ratus Tahun [Batavia's Shipyard For Three Hundred Years] (in Indonesian). Jakarta: Yayasan Cipta Loka Caraka.
- Merrillees, Scott (2000). Batavia in Nineteenth Century Photographs. Singapore: Editions Didier Millet. ISBN 9789813018778.
- Rusman, E. (1935). Wings across continents: (the K. L. M. Amsterdam-Batavia line). A. Blitz.
