= Marine Hotel, Batavia =

Marine Hotel
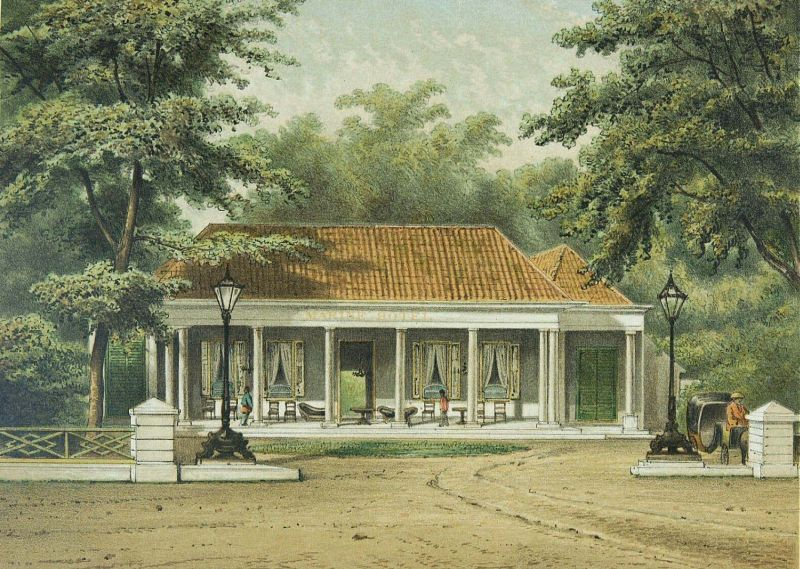
- Marine Hotel in late 19th-century

- Location within Jakarta Location within Indonesia

General information
- Status: Demolished
- Type: Hotel
- Architectural style: Indies Empire style
- Location: Batavia, Dutch East Indies, Molenvliet West
- Coordinates: 6°10′03″S 106°49′13″E
- Completed: 1815?
- Demolished: 1890

Design and construction
- Architect: anonymous

Marine Hotel was one of the former landmark of the Molenvliet, a 17th-century built canal located in Batavia, the Dutch East Indies (now Jakarta, Indonesia). Marine Hotel was located at the south end of Molenvliet West (now Jalan Gajah Mada), approximately at the location of the old building of Bank Tabungan Negara. The building has been demolished.

== Description ==
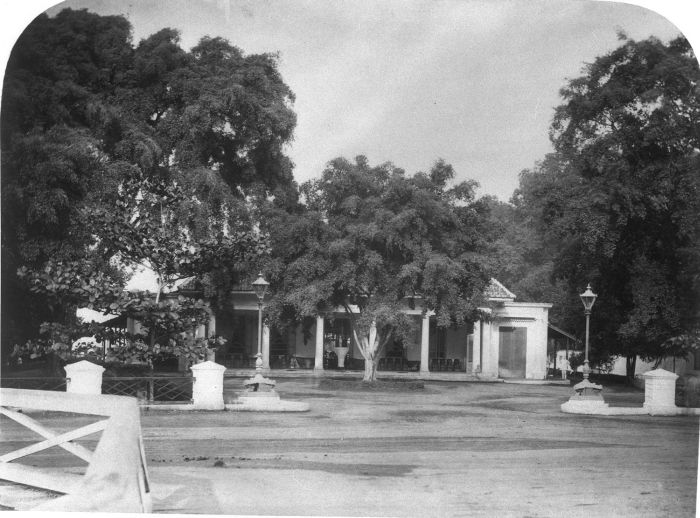
Marine Hotel.

Marine Hotel was located at the southern end of Molenvliet West (now Jalan Gajah Mada). The location of the building was approximately beside the private estate "Moenswijk", the area of which was approximately the same size as the location of the old headquarter of Bank Tabungan Negara (formerly the Postspaarbank).

The building of Marine Hotel is an archetypal Dutch Indies Empire style which can be found in many places in Jakarta. The building had a symmetrical layout, with north and south wing flanking the main building. It contains a relatively spacious front terrace (voorgalerij) where wooden furniture were placed for pleasure activities and relaxation. Row of Greek columns decorates the front portico. Large windows at the front provides cross ventilation into the interior.

== History ==
Before the hotel, there was a small VOC fort constructed in 1656 presumably to guard the southern end of the Molenvliet. In the mid-1680s, improving security in Java following the subjugation of the Banten Sultanate means that fortification was not needed any longer and so in 1697 the fort was vacated. The fort was later demolished in 1729. Following the massacre of the Chinese incident in 1740, a new security post was installed approximately at the same location. This new post would only be demolished under the governorship of Governor General Herman Willem Daendels in 1808-1809. Remnants of the old fortification could still be seen as of 1815.

In 1815, Jan Tiedeman bought the site for 4,150 Spanish piastres. He built a large house on it, although it is not clear whether his house was the same building of what would be Marine Hotel. Before 1819, the plot – together with the house – were sold to Pieter Willem Helvetius van Riemsdijk for 32,000 Spanish silver piastres. This house has been reestablished as a hotel at least in the early 1830s. Pieter Christiaan Stelling (born 1794 or 1795), listed as an innkeeper at Molenvliet in 1832, bought the building of the hotel in 1833. Stelling died in 1836 and his widow sold the hotel to Hendrik Loust in 1853.

In the 1850s, the growing popularity of studio portraits created a market for itinerant photographers around the world. L. Saurman, an itinerant photographer for commercial advertising, who had earlier worked in Singapore, visited Batavia in early 1853 and operated the Saurman's Daguerrian Gallery from the Marine Hotel. His advertisement for his Daguerrian Gallery in a local newspaper was the first known advertisement by a commercial photographer in Batavia.

In 1861, Marine Hotel was sold to Cornelis Kramers. When Kramers died, his widow sold the hotel to Eugene Achille Bonnet in 1867. Bonnet may have briefly been the resident chef of the hotel, but he died in 1868. Two years later in 1870, his widow sold the hotel to Europe Honore Girardeau. Girardeau was the managing partner of Batavia's famous bakery Leroux & Co. Girardeau died in 1875, and so the hotel was managed by his widow and four children until 1888. In 1888, the family sold the property at auction, and so the building ceased to be a hotel. The building became the headquarter of the Burgersocieteit ("civic club") "De Club" for a brief period until it was decided to demolish the building in 1890. Over it, the cooperative department store Eigen Hulp was constructed which was later demolished to make way for the Postspaarbank. Postspaarbank became the Bank Tabungan Negara Office following the independence of Indonesia.

== See also ==
- Indies Empire style
- List of colonial buildings and structures in Jakarta

== Cited works ==
- Hannavy, John, ed. (2013). Encyclopedia of Nineteenth-Century Photography. New York: Routledge. ISBN 9781135873271.
- Merrillees, Scott (2000). Batavia in Nineteenth Century Photographs. Singapore: Editions Didier Millet. ISBN 9789813018778.
