= Nieuwe Zakelijkheid =

Dutch style of modernist architecture

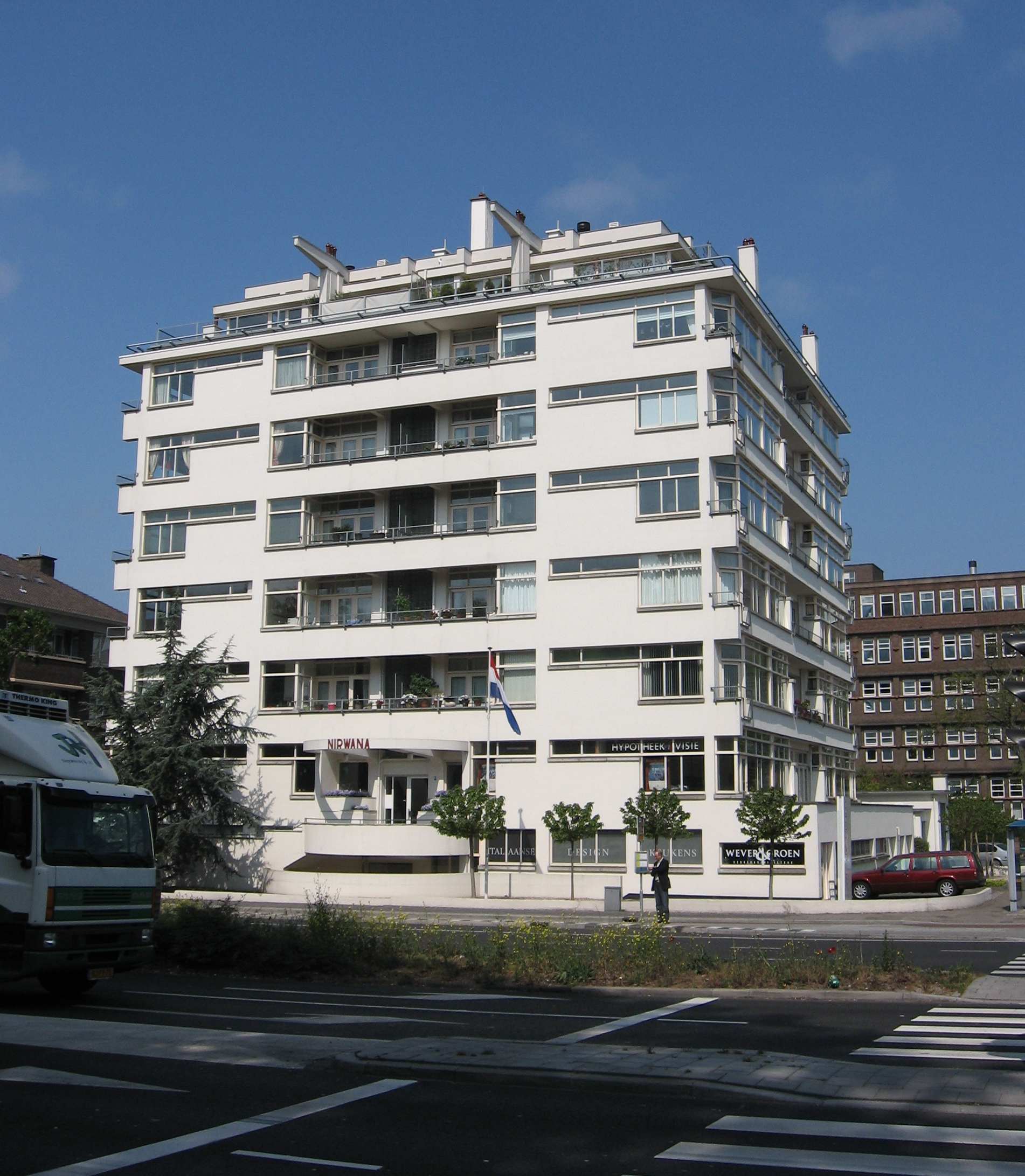
Nirwana-flat in The Hague, by J. Duiker and J.G. Wiebenga

Nieuwe Zakelijkheid, translated as New Objectivity or New Pragmatism, is a Dutch period of modernist architecture that started in the 1920s and continued into the 1930s. The term is also used to denote a (brief) period in art and literature (especially the early novels Blokken, Knorrende Beesten, and Bint by Ferdinand Bordewijk). Related to and descended from the German movement Neue Sachlichkeit, Nieuwe Zakelijkheid is characterized by angular shapes and designs that are generally free of ornamentation and decoration. The architecture is based on functional considerations and often includes open layouts that allow spaces to be used with flexibility. Sliding doors were included in some of the designs.

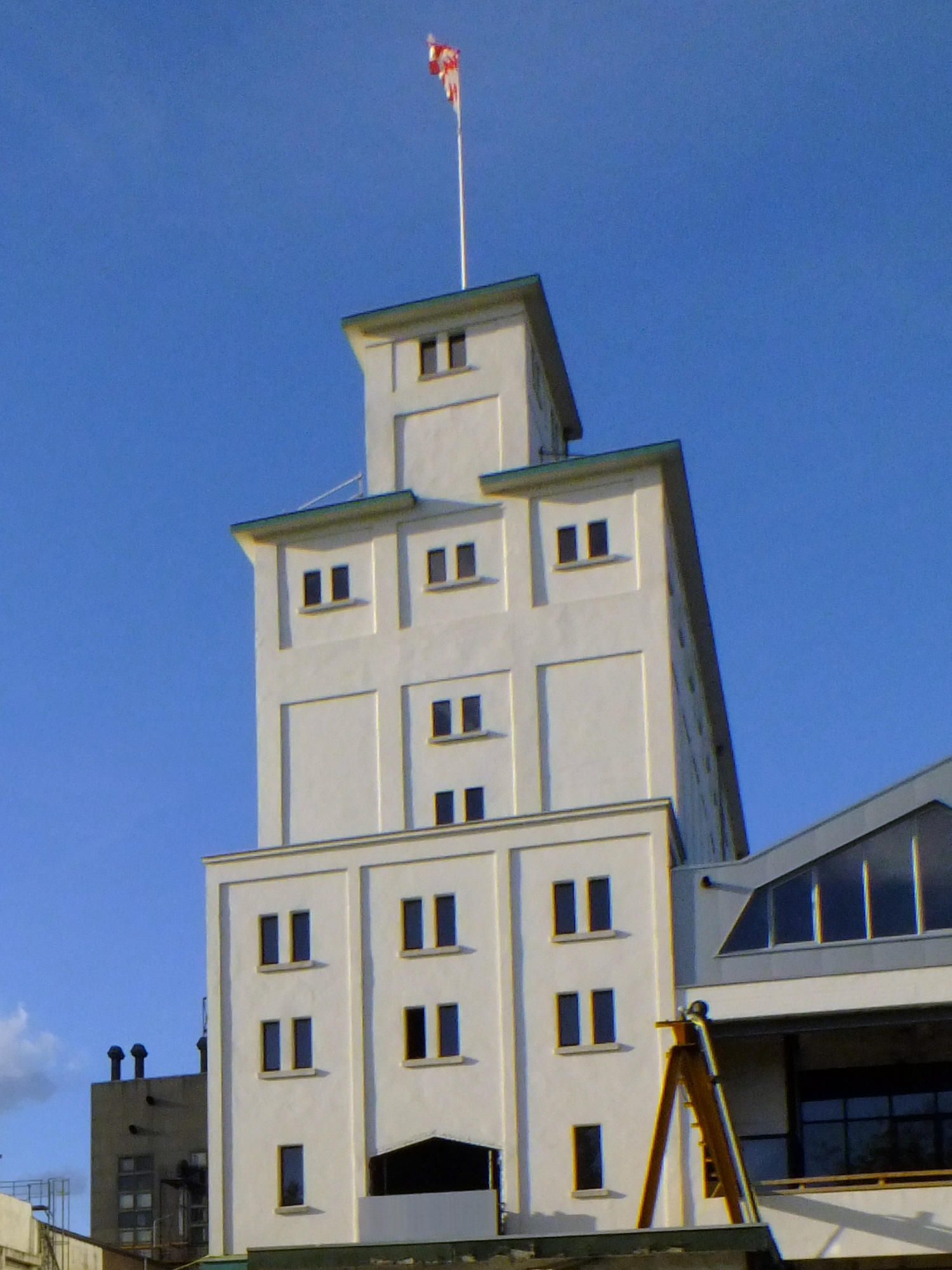
CHV-silo in Veghel, by J.G. Wiebenga

The movement is associated with Het Nieuwe Bouwen (new building) and was contemporary and related to cubism and De Stijl, and applies similar design principles to architecture. Dutch architects working in this style included Theo van Doesburg, Gerrit Rietveld, and J.J.P. Oud. The architectural style is similar to the artwork of Piet Mondrian, who was working contemporaneously with the architects. Common influences are also seen in furniture designs.

Some critics associated the style with dogmatic Marxism or Capitalism, seeing in the buildings a reflection of the mass-produced values that comes with a focus on economy rather than craftsmanship.

== Dutch East Indies ==
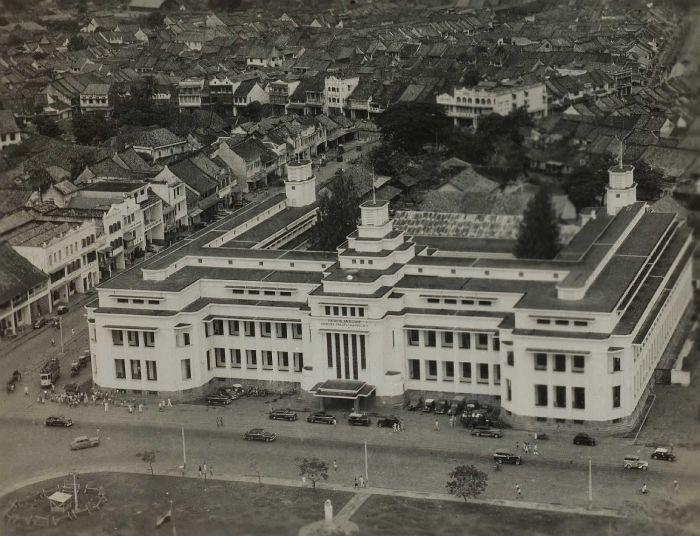
The Netherlands Trading Society office building in Batavia, now Mandiri Museum

By the end of the 1920s, Nieuwe Zakelijkheid had become popular in the Dutch East Indies. The style was slightly conformed to the tropical climate of Indonesia with the addition of the 'double facade' concept, a typical element of tropical Indische architecture. The earliest example of this is the office of the Netherlands Trading Society building (1929) in Batavia, Dutch East Indies now Mandiri Museum, built under a well-planned spatial planning around the station square Stationsplein of Kota Station, a sample of pre-World War II urban planning which for Southeast Asia was completely unprecedented. Other notable examples are Palembang City Hall (Snuyf, 1928–1931, nicknamed Gedung Ledeng, Indonesian "plumb building") and Kota Post Office Building (Baumgartner, 1929).

== See also ==
- New Objectivity
