= Hotel der Nederlanden =

Hotel der Nederlanden, Hotel Dharma Nirmala
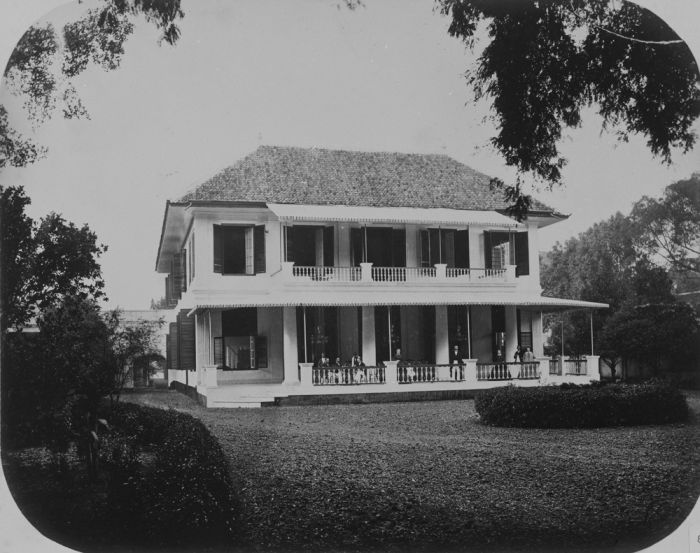
- The Rijswijk entrance of Hotel der Nederlanden, showing the main building before its remodelling in 1922.
- Interactive map of the Hotel der Nederlanden, Hotel Dharma Nirmala area

General information
- Status: Demolished
- Type: Hotel
- Architectural style: Indies Empire style, New Indies Style
- Location: Jalan Veteran
- Coordinates: 6.167956°S 106.824918°E
- Completed: 1794
- Demolished: 1969

Hotel der Nederlanden (also Hotel Dharma Nirmala during its last 10 years) was a historic hotel in Jakarta, Indonesia. Hotel der Nederlanden was one of the three grand hotels in Batavia during the last period of the colonial rule, the other being Hotel des Indes and the Grand Hotel Java. The hotel had operated for more than a century, after which it was demolished in 1969 and was replaced with the Bina Graha presidential office.

== History ==
=== Private residence ===
The hotel started as a private residence of Pieter Tenzy; the building was built in 1794. In 1799, the house was acquired by Willem Hendrik van Eijsseldijk, member of the Raad van Indie. Between 1811 and 1815, the house was bought by Thomas Stamford Raffles for 27,000 rupee to be used as his own private residence when he was working as a lieutenant-governor of Java between 1811 and 1816. Raffles expanded the courtyard and added several sculptures at the entrance. It was sold to the government of the Dutch Indies in 1816 when he left the country.

=== Colonial hotel ===
In 1837, the house was renovated into a hotel known as Hotel Palais Royale; which would start the beginning of the building as one of the grandest hotel in Batavia. The name Hotel der Nederlanden was acquired in 1846. In 1906, the dining hall of the hotel was remodeled by Indies architect Moojen. In 1922, the main building of the hotel on the Rijswijk entrance was remodeled.

=== Post-independence ===
In the 1950s, the hotel rating was downgraded to a "B" class hotel, as seen in the 1951 government rankings. It was ranked behind the Hotel des Indes, which was the only "A" class hotel in Jakarta at that time. In 1958, the hotel's name was nationalized into Hotel Dharma Nirmala to remove all Dutch colonial nuances while keeping the HDN initials which had been used in the glassware and crockery.

Later, a restaurant wing was added to the hotel. This restaurant, known as The Ambassador, was among the few building in Jakarta that was equipped with air-conditioning unit.

Later, Hotel Dharma Nirmala was converted into the headquarter of the Tjakrabirawa Regiment. In 1969, the hotel was demolished and the Bina Graha presidential office and museum was built in its place between 1969 and 1970.

== The building complex ==
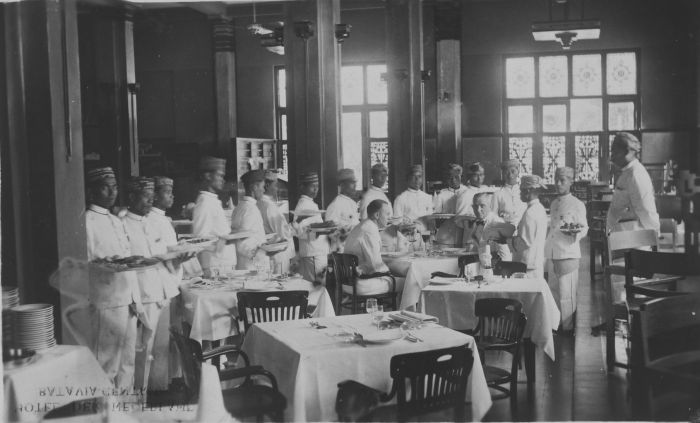
The grand dining hall of Hotel der Nederlanden, designed in 1906 by Pieter Moojen.

The hotel was located directly east of the Paleis van de Gouverneur Generaal (now Istana Negara). The hotel has two entrances, the tree-lined Koningsplein entrance (now Jalan Medan Merdeka Utara) and the canaled Rijswijk entrance (now Jalan Veteran) where the main building was located.

During its golden age in the early 20th-century, the hotel boasted facilities such as bungalows, pavilions, stables, and coach-houses. The pavilions were freestanding buildings known for its wide verandas and a private bathroom, creating the comfort of private residences. A bungalow contains three lodge rooms. In the 1920s, all of the lodge rooms were equipped with electric lights, running water, call bells, and sanitation "on the most modern principles".

The 1906-restored dining hall forms the main part of the main building. Designed by Indies architect Moojen (architect of the Kunstkring Art Gallery and Cirebon railway station), the grand dining hall was capable of seating two hundred people. The kitchens were led by European chef and European assistants. The restaurant served mainly European dishes as well as the Indies Rijsttafel.

Hotel der Nederlanden owned a tiffin room located in Oud Jakarta's business district on Binnen Nieuwepoortstraat (now Jalan Pintu Besar Utara).

== Cited works ==
- Akihary, Huib (1990). Architectuur & Stedebouw in Indonesië 1870/1970. Zutphen: De Walburg Pers. ISBN 9072691024.
- Dinas Museum dan Sejarah (1986). Sejarah Singkat Gedung-Gedung Tua di Jakarta [Brief History of Old Buildings in Jakarta]. Jakarta: Pemerintah Daerah Khusus Ibukota Jakarta.
- Merrillees, Scott (2012). Greetings from Jakarta: Postcards of a Capital 1900-1950. Jakarta: Equinox Publishing. ISBN 9789793780887.
- Merrillees, Scott (2015). Jakarta: Portraits of a Capital 1950-1980. Jakarta: Equinox Publishing. ISBN 9786028397308.

== See also ==
- List of colonial buildings and structures in Jakarta
