= Mandiri Museum =

Museum in Jakarta, Indonesia

- Museum Mandiri

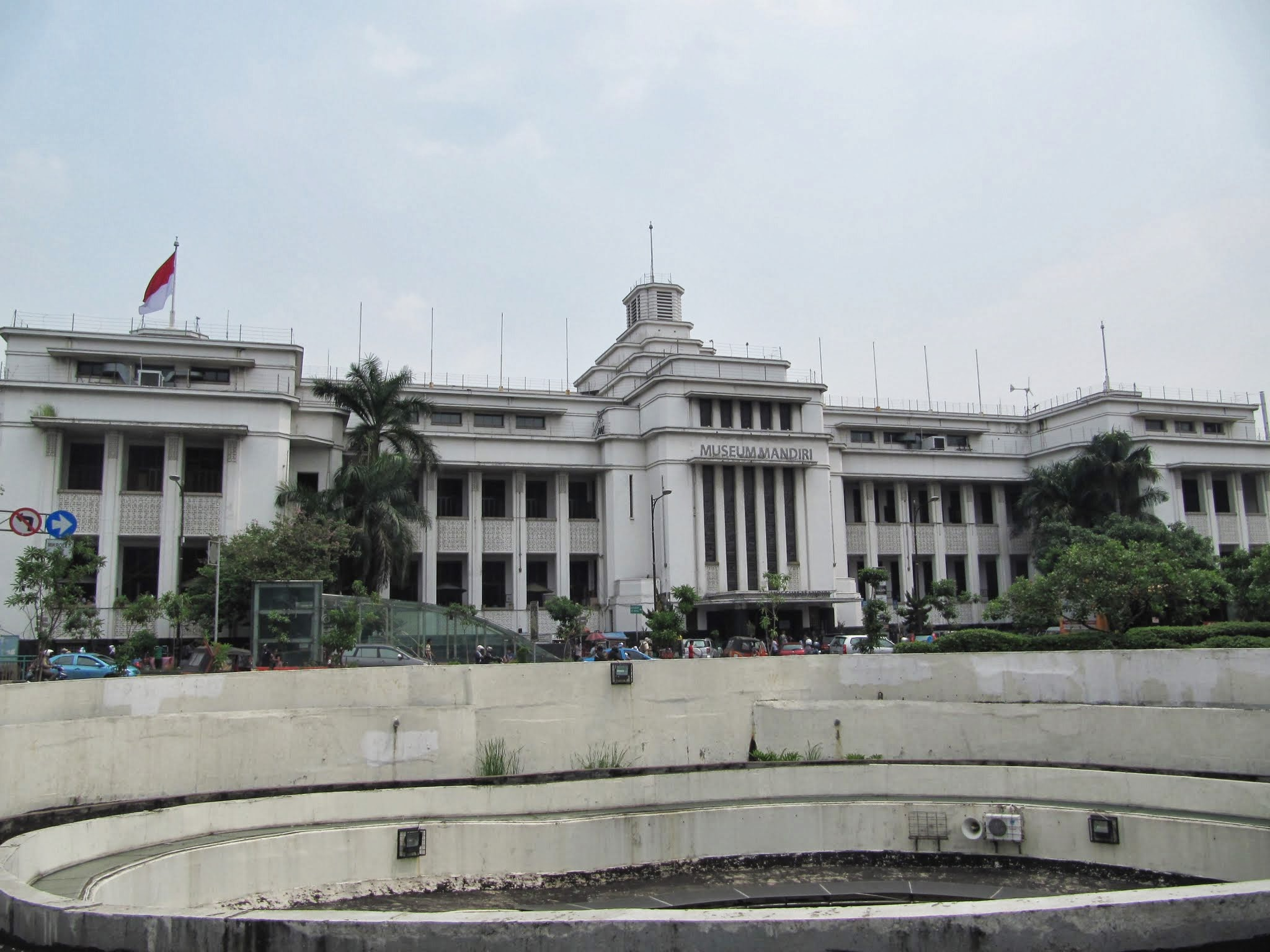
- The front facade of Mandiri Museum.

- Location within Jakarta
- Established: October 2, 1998
- Location: Jl. Lapangan Stasiun No. 1, West Jakarta
- Coordinates: 6.137960°S 106.813270°E
- Type: Economics and numismatics
- Collection size: A collection of colonial banking-related items
- Owner: Bank Mandiri
- Public transit access: Jakarta Kota; Kota

Mandiri Museum (Indonesian: Museum Mandiri), or Bank Mandiri Museum (Indonesian: Museum Bank Mandiri), is the corporate museum of the namesake Bank Mandiri, located in the old banking district of Jakarta Old Town in northern Jakarta, Indonesia. The museum is housed in the former headquarters of the Netherlands Trading Society, one of the primary ancestor of ABN AMRO. The museum is closed on Mondays and public holidays. It is located next to Museum Bank Indonesia, and right in front of Jakarta Kota Station.

== History ==
=== The building ===
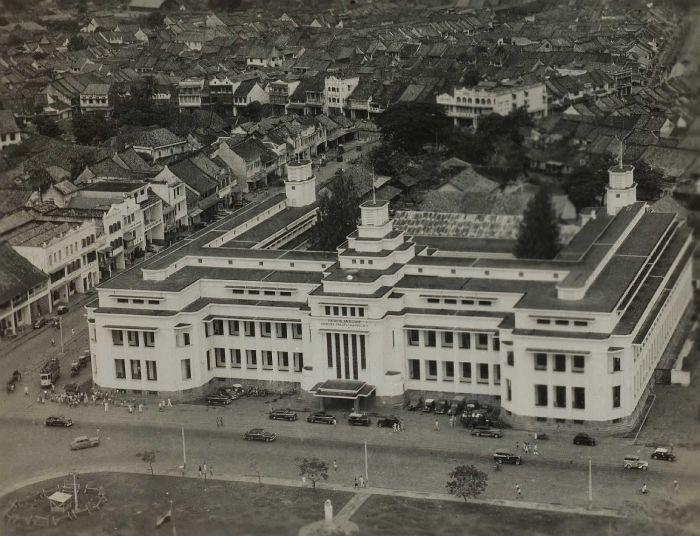
The NHM building circa 1955.

The building stands on a 10,039 square meters land. This land was previously owned by the firm Carl Schlieper, who built a large office building and a warehouse. In 1913, the land was purchased by the Factorij. At midnight of December 17, 1920, the Schlieper building caught fire. The damaged building was destroyed later to make way for a new building which will become the Netherlands Trading Society (Nederlandsche Handel-Maatschappij or NHM), also known as "Factorij".

The new building was designed by J.J.J de Bruyn, A.P. Smits and C. van de Linde. Construction started in 1929 and was opened on January 14, 1933 by C.J Karel Van Aalst, the 10th President of NHM. The architecture follows the philosophy of the Dutch Nieuwe Zakelijkheid, a branch of modern architecture close to Art Deco.

The very profitable NHM was finally nationalized in November 1960, after shareholders and management tried to keep it under Dutch control in the 1950s. In December 1960, it became the property of the Department of Export-Import of the Bank Koperasi Tani & Nelayan (BKTN). This became the Bank Export Import Indonesia (or Bank Exim) on December 31, 1968 until the legal merge of Bank Exim, Bank Dagang Negara, Bank Bumi Daya, and Bank Pembangunan Indonesia to become Bank Mandiri in 1999.

=== The museum ===
The museum was established by Bank Mandiri on October 2, 1998. Its collection consists of various items related to banking activity and its development in "Tempo Doeloe" (in Indonesia meaning: "Good old days"). Its collection range from colonial bank owned operating supplies, securities, old currencies, old Dutch safe deposit box, and many others. In addition the building's interior, old ornaments, and furniture is kept as it was during the colonial era.

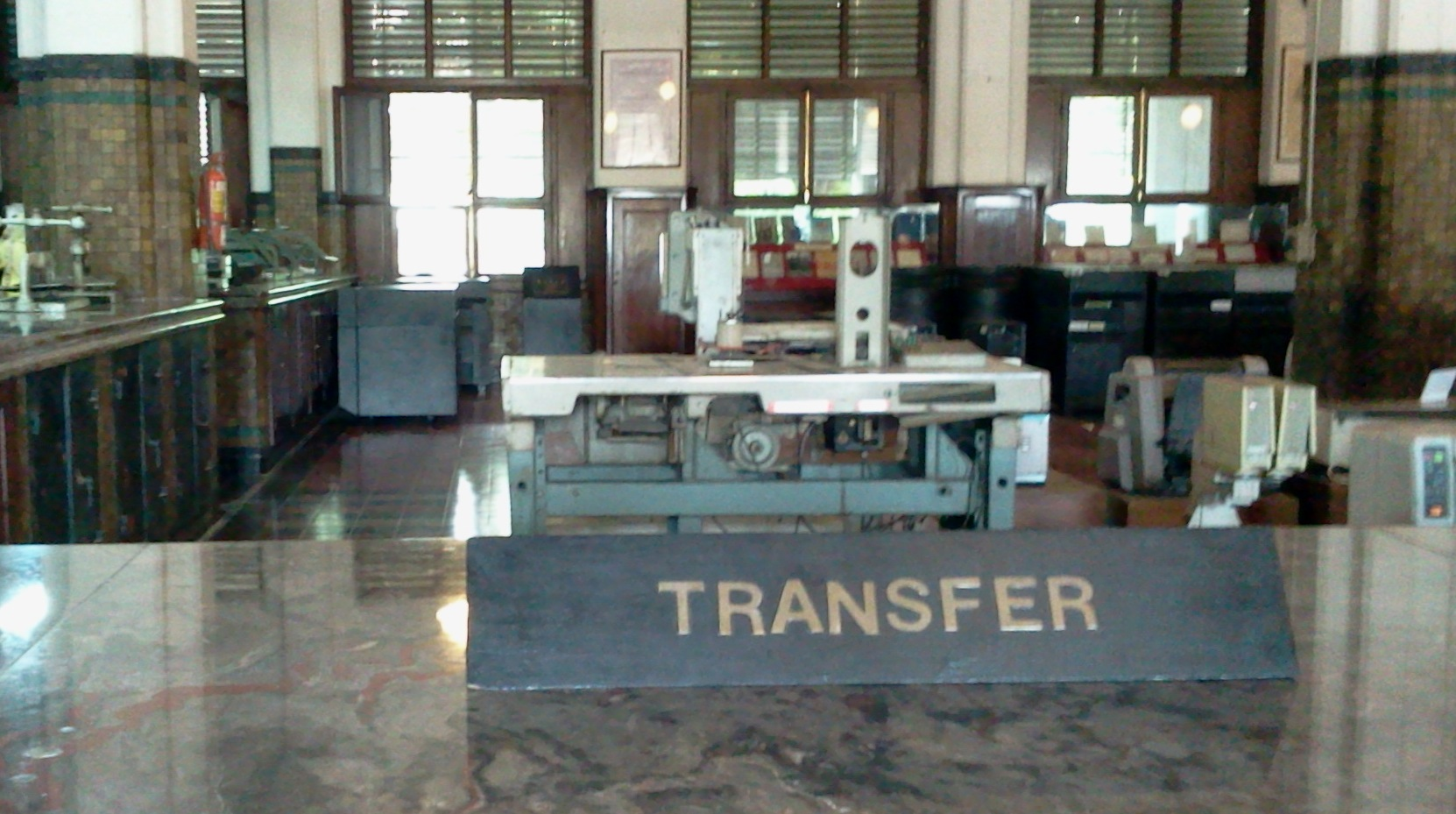
Transfer desk with old machines background.

== The collection ==
The museum hosts a collection of items related to colonial banking activities, such as security documents, numismatics (coin collections), cash counters, and safes from the colonial era. The collection is displayed in exhibits which imitate the old days atmosphere of the bank.

== See also ==
- List of colonial buildings and structures in Jakarta
- List of museums and cultural institutions in Indonesia

== Cited works ==
- Merrillees, Scott (2015). Jakarta: Portraits of a Capital 1950-1980. Jakarta: Equinox Publishing. ISBN 9786028397308.
