= Hotel Sriwijaya, Jakarta =

Hotel Sriwijaya
- Interactive map of the Hotel Sriwijaya area
- Former names: Hotel Cavadino, Hotel du Lion d’Or

General information
- Type: Hotel
- Location: Jakarta, Indonesia, Jalan Veteran 1
- Coordinates: 6.168619°S 106.829870°E
- Construction started: 1970
- Owner: PT. Graha Sriwijaya Hotel

Hotel Sriwijaya is a three-stars hotel located in Jakarta, Indonesia. The building of Hotel Sriwijaya has always been a hotel for over 125 years. Hotel Sriwijaya is the oldest surviving hotel building in Jakarta.

== Description ==
Hotel Sriwijaya is managed by PT. Graha Sriwijaya Hotel. Hotel Sriwijaya, a member of the Indonesian Hotel and Restaurant Association or PHRI (Perhimpunan Hotel dan Restoran Indonesia), has operated since 1970. The hotel is located at the center of the administrative district of Jakarta. It is located very close to some of Jakarta's national landmark e.g. Istiqlal Mosque, the Cathedral, and the Monas.

== History ==
The buildings of Hotel Sriwijaya was constructed in mid 19th-century during the era of Governor-General van den Bosch. The premises, which consists of two building compounds, were acquired by Conrad Alexander Willem Cavadino. He started a restaurant and a firm of confectionery and pastry cooks in 1863. The restaurant was named Cavadino Restaurant. Before starting his business, Cavadino worked as an innkeeper at the Concordia Military Society located on the Waterlooplein. In 1863, Cavadino was the treasurer of the official body who was charged with managing the property of the Catholic Church in Batavia.

Cavadino's premises were located on the corner of Rijswijk (now Jalan Veteran) and Citadelweg (now Jalan Veteran I). By 1872, Cavadino Restaurant was already transformed into a hotel named Hotel Cavadino. In the same year, the confectionery and pastry shop (now Bintang Meeting Room) located in front of the hotel was given a name Toko Cavadino. In an 1894 advertisement, the Cavadino Shop was recorded as selling “bonbons and chocolate, Dutch, Havana and Manila Cigars, fine comestibles, wine—beer, liquors etc. etc. etc.”. Cavadino Shop was very notable at that time that the bridge in front of the hotel was named Cavadinobrug or "Cavadino Bridge" (located at Jalan Ir. H. Juanda, at a point where it crossed a canal which feeds the Ciliwung to the Molenvliet).

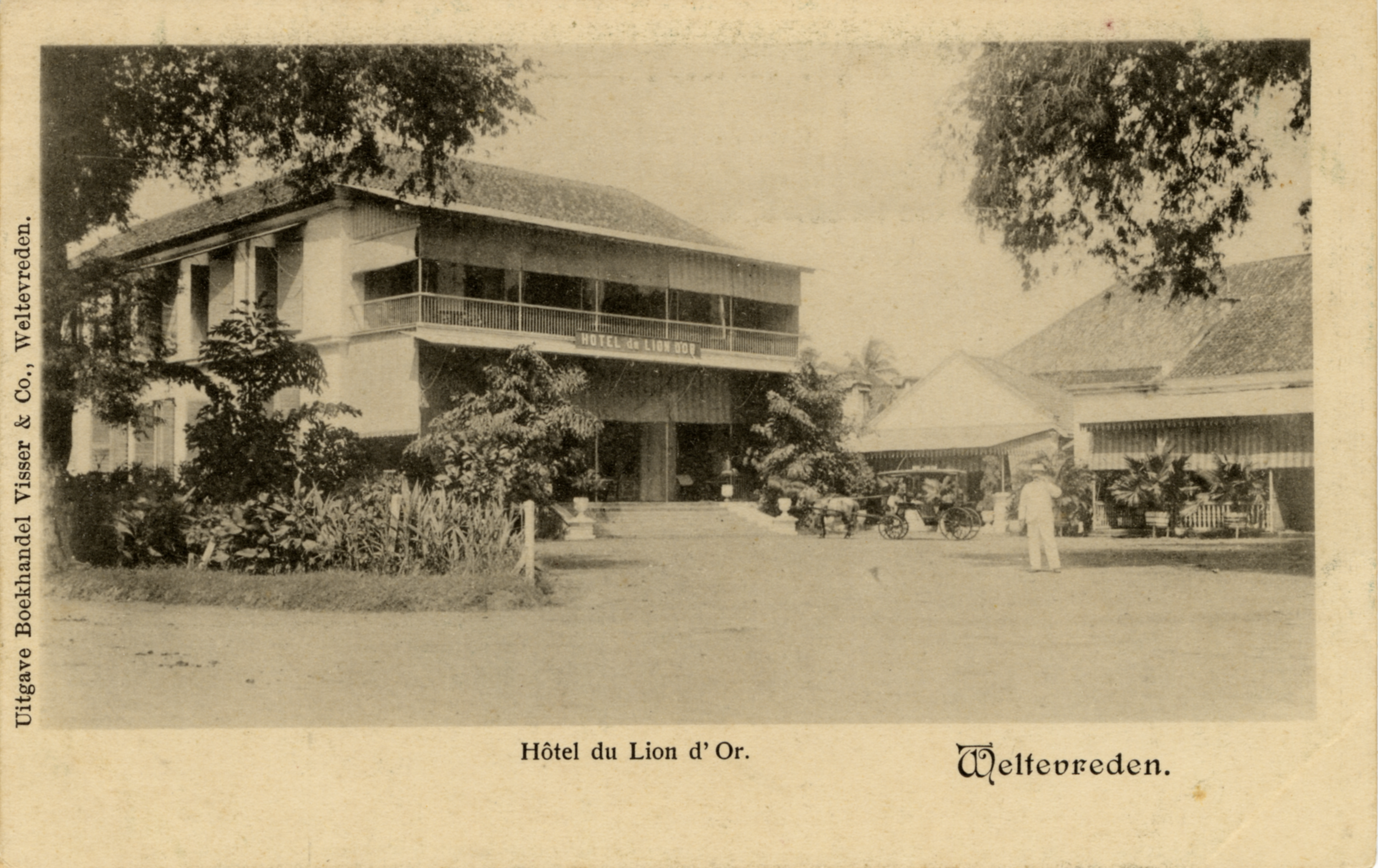
Hôtel du Lion d'Or in the beginning of the 20th century.

The shop and hotel stayed in business until late 19th century. 1870 was actually the year in which Cavadino was no longer a citizen of Batavia. The firm traded under the name C.A.W. Cavadino would last until 1871. In 1872, the firm became known as Cavadino & Co. The hotel and shop continued to operate to the end of the 19th century. In 1898, the premises were bought by new management and the hotel was converted into Hotel du Lion d’Or. In July 1941, the hotel had become the Park Hotel. In the mid-1950s the hotel was renamed to Hotel Sriwijaya, the first mention of Sriwijaya as the name of the hotel. The hotel may have been converted into a mess hall for the Indonesian Air Force briefly after the independence of Indonesia.

In 1975, the premises were bought by Al Jufri. In 1999, the facade and the teak interior of the main hotel building were remodeled significantly, mainly due to the worsening condition of the wooden facade and interior. The complete remodeling of the building was so thorough that the former 19th-century Indies Empire style was lost. Despite the complete remodeling of the interior and the exterior, the building is never demolished, thus maintaining its authenticity. Because of this, and its retained function, Hotel Sriwijaya is the oldest surviving hotel in Jakarta.

== See also ==
- List of colonial buildings and structures in Jakarta

== Cited works ==
- Merrillees, Scott (2000). Batavia in Nineteenth Century Photographs. Singapore: Editions Didier Millet. ISBN 9789813018778.
