= Asuransi Jasindo =

Indonesian insurance company

PT Asuransi Jasa Indonesia
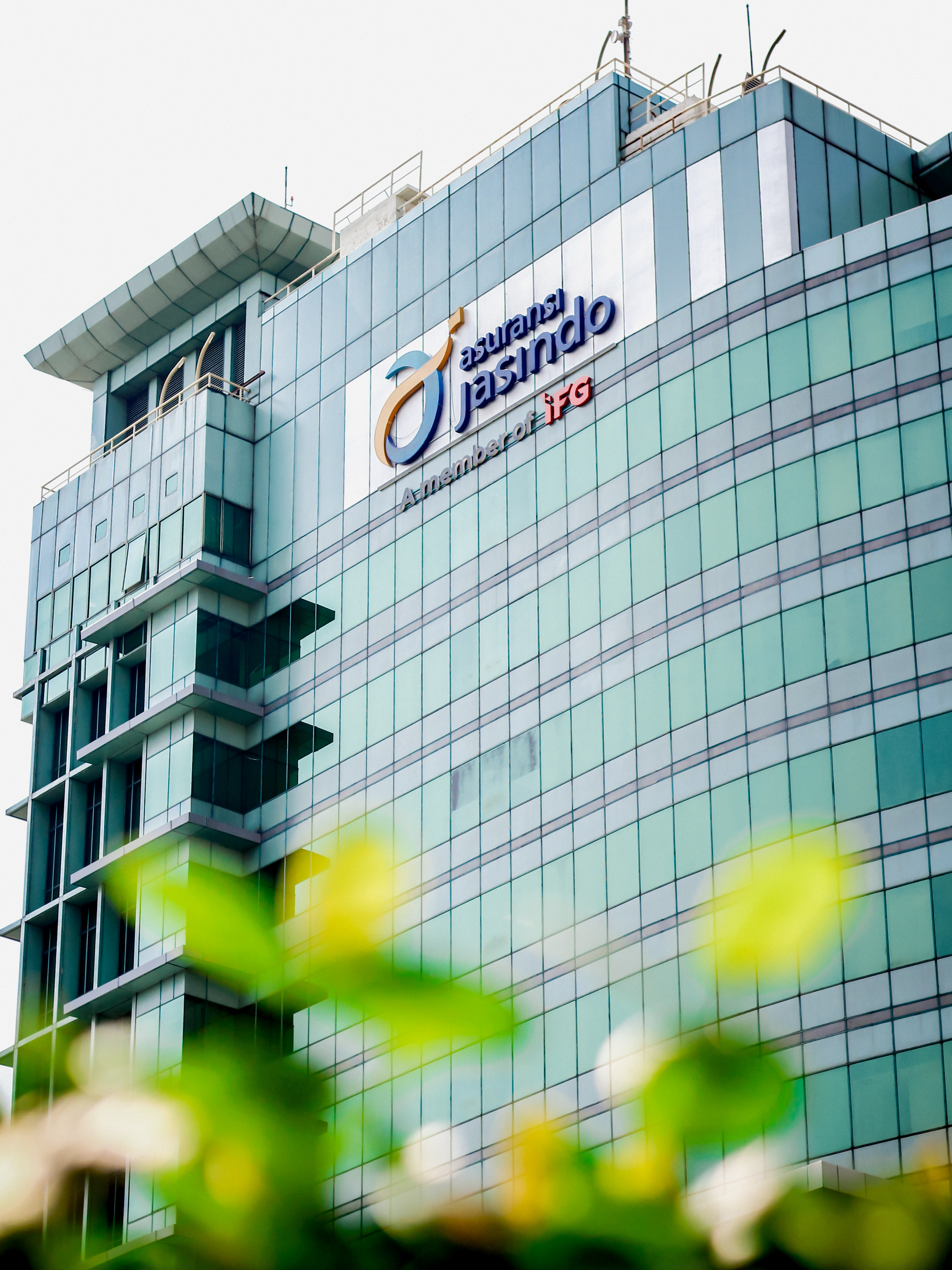
- Head office of Asuransi Jasindo in Jakarta, showing its current logo
- Trade name: Jasindo
- Company type: State-owned PT
- Industry: Insurance
- Predecessors: PT Asuransi Bendasraya (Persero); PT Umum International Underwriters
- Founded: 2 June 1973; 53 years ago
- Headquarters: Central Jakarta, Jakarta, Indonesia
- Area served: Indonesia
- Revenue: Rp 5,392 triliun (2019)
- Net income: Rp 125,921 milyar (2019)
- Total assets: Rp 12,688 triliun (2019)
- Total equity: Rp 3,267 triliun (2019)
- Owner: Bahana Pembinaan Usaha Indonesia
- Number of employees: 1,029 (2019)
- Subsidiaries: PT Mitracipta Polasarana; PT Asuransi Jasindo Syariah
- Website: www.jasindo.co.id

PT Asuransi Jasa Indonesia or known as Asuransi Jasindo is an Indonesian company engaged in service insurance. In 2020, the company officially became a member of the state-owned insurance holding company, after the majority of its shares held by the government were handed over to Bahana Pembinaan Usaha Indonesia.
