= Hotel des Indes (Batavia) =

Hotel in Batavia (Jakarta), Indonesia

Coordinates: 6°09′55.1″S 106°49′11.1″E

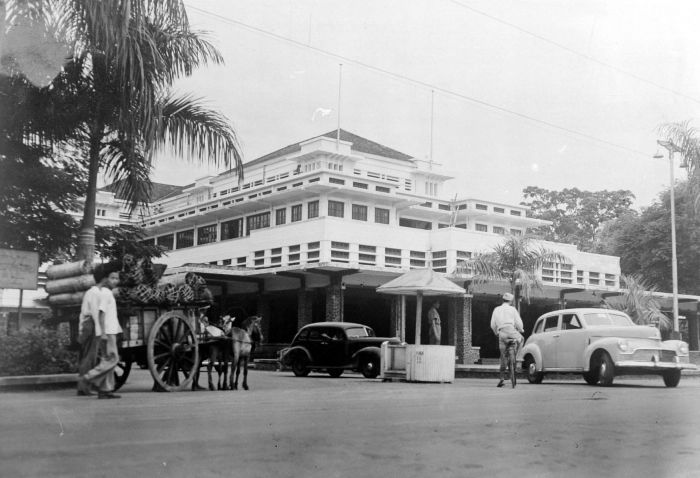
Hotel des Indes in the late 1940s

Hotel des Indes was one of the oldest and most prestigious hotels in Asia. Located in Batavia, Dutch East Indies, the hotel had accommodated countless famous patrons throughout its existence from 1829 to 1971. Before being named Hotel des Indes, a name suggested by the writer Multatuli, it was named "Hotel de Provence" by its first French owner, and for a short spell went by the name "Hotel Rotterdam". After Indonesian independence it was renamed "Hotel Duta Indonesia", until it was demolished to make way for a shopping mall.

== Background ==
The city of Batavia was founded by the Dutch East India Company (VOC) and became the main Dutch settlement in South East Asia. In 1747, the Dutch already started to build on the land where later the hotel would be built. In 1760, the site was bought by the VOC Governor General Reynier de Klerck.

In 1824, the land was bought by the Dutch East Indies government. In 1828, a boarding school for girls was constructed. However the boarding school was soon abandoned because due to the lack of European women in the Dutch East Indies its teachers kept leaving to get married.

In 1829, the real estate was bought by the Frenchman Antoine Surleon Chaulan, who started a hotel named after his birthplace: "Hotel de Provence". At an auction in 1845, Etienne Chaulan bought the hotel from his brother for 25,000 Dutch guilders. Etienne made the hotel famous for being the first to sell different types of European style ice cream.

In 1851, the hotel was bought by Cornelis Denninghoff, who changed the name to "Hotel Rotterdam". Although the hotel was located close to the elite "Harmony Society" and French tailor shop "Oger Frères", it lost prestige and the next year the property was bought by a Swiss staff member named Francois Auguste Emile Wyss, who was married to Antoinette Victorine Chaulan, the 16-year-old daughter of Surleon Chaulan.

== History ==
=== Hotel des Indes ===
On the advice of none other than patron Eduard Douwes Dekker, Wyss changed the name of the hotel to the much more chic-sounding Hotel des Indes in 1856. In 1860, Wyss sold the hotel to the Frenchman Cresonnier. Louis Couperus, yet another writer, became a regular patron. Cresonnier commissioned the British photographers Walter B. Woodbury (1834–1885) and James Page (1833–1865) to photographically capture the hotel for an advertisement campaign.

Ocean travelers in the 19th century arriving in the port of Batavia were taken to shore with small boats and dropped off at the "Kleine Boom" customs office. They were then taken to the hotel in a carriage along Molenvliet street. In 1869, British anthropologist Alfred Russel Wallace described the hotel's accommodation as: "The Hôtel des Indes was very comfortable, each visitor having a sitting-room and bedroom opening on a verandah, where he can take his morning coffee and afternoon tea. In the centre of the quadrangle is a building containing a number of marble baths always ready for use; and there is an excellent table d'hôte breakfast at ten, and dinner at six, for all which there is a moderate charge per day."

Cresonnier died in 1870 and his family sold the hotel to Theodor Gallas who in turn sold, in 1886, to Jacob Lugt for 177.000 Dutch guilders. Lugt greatly expanded the hotel with land purchased from his neighbours. During the economic depression in 1897, Lugt founded the "s.a. Hotel Des Indes" to avert financial liability in case of a potential bankruptcy.

=== World War II ===
In 1942, the Japanese seized the hotel and renamed it. Director G. Hötte, manager since 1938, was left in charge. Only the general chief of service, who was held in high esteem by the indigenous staff, was considered indispensable, until a Japanese hotelier took charge. Thereafter, the remaining indigenous staff was not treated very cordially, but encouraged by the elder employees they nevertheless remained in service for over a year before being interned in a Japanese prisoner camp.

Future Indonesian Vice President Mohammad Hatta was temporarily housed in the hotel by the Japanese authorities.

=== Indonesian Revolution ===
After the Japanese capitulation in 1945, the office of the Recovery of Allied Prisoners of War and Internees (RAPWI) took over the hotel and made it a safe haven for returning European refugees. However, in the period following the Declaration of Independence on August 17, 1945 most of the Indonesian staff quit, as part of the time of Revolution against Dutch colonialism.

In June 1946, the hotel was back in business. G .P. M. van Weel was appointed director, with advisory co-directors, A. and F. J. Zeilinga, who ensured that for the time being the hotel was fully up and running again. On 7 May 1949, the hotel was the historic location of the Roem–van Roijen Agreement that led to the release of Sukarno and Mohammad Hatta and eventually the Dutch transfer of sovereignty to the Indonesian Republic.

=== The hotel in the Indonesian nation ===
After the end of the Revolution against the Dutch, in 1949, the hotel was annexed without compensation and renamed Hotel Duta Indonesia. In the early 1950s, the hotel remained a central institution for the Djakarta elite, hosting prominent events including dinners, receptions and fashion shows. But it was transformed from being a Dutch colonial space into a modern Indonesian one.

A description of women arriving for a “mode-show” (fashion show) the featured both Western and Indonesian fashions, from the national women’s magazine Wanita in August 1950, translated from the Indonesian original written by S. Pudjo Samadi, captures the magic of the space:

“The lights shone bright in the room at the top of the Hotel des Indes, the hotel that has been called the gateway to the island of Java. There was no end to the automobiles dropping off their passengers in front of the entrance that led to the upper room. They got out in pairs, women of various nationalities, accompanied by escorts who were always ready at their sides. There were also those who came by themselves. Everyone’s faces seemed full of hope. It was as if truly what they were about to see in a few minutes was only for them, the soft ones, the beauties.”

The event was not simply a fashion show. It was a part of the process through which the new nation was beginning to re-imagine what the new nation should look and feel like. Ibu Pudjo continued:

“And we, the audience, should be pleased because we have seen the possibilities in front of us to bring our own Indonesian authentic women’s clothing to the highest level, which is also in line with our authentic selves.”

In 1958, the hotel still welcomed the likes of American actor John Wayne. Nevertheless, the hotel's commercial decline commenced, especially after 1962, when the Sukarno-commissioned competing Hotel Indonesia was inaugurated. The hotel was demolished in 1971, to make way for a shopping mall.

== See also ==
- List of colonial buildings and structures in Jakarta
