= Gedung Antara =

Coordinates: 6°09′57″S 106°50′02″E

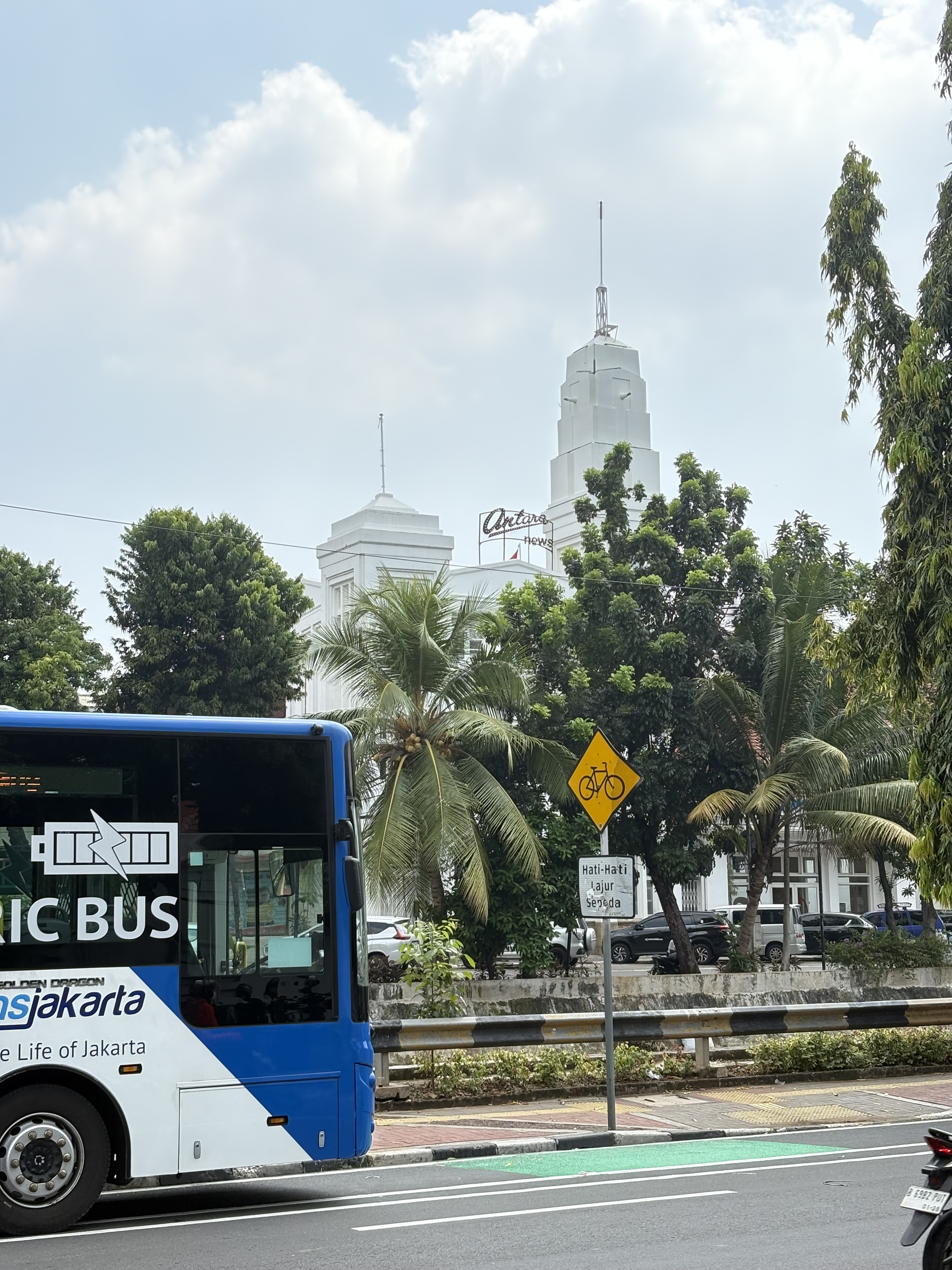
The Antara building as of 2025.

Gedung Antara ("Antara Building") is a Dutch colonial landmark in Jakarta. It is located in the vicinity of Pasar Baru area. The building is currently Antara's Institute of Journalism.

== History ==
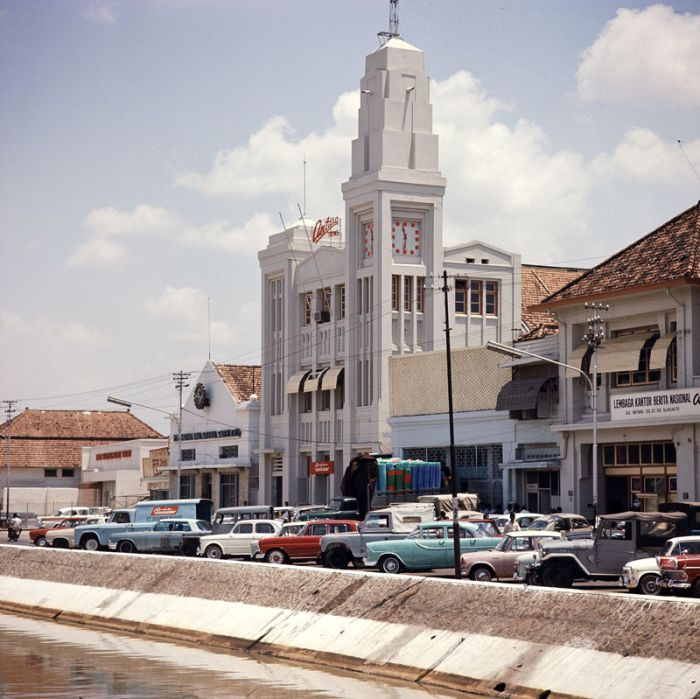
Office building of Antara in 1971.

The building was originally office building for ANETA, the first news agency in the Dutch East Indies (now Indonesia). During the Japanese occupation period, the Antara news agency, which previously occupied a building in Buitentijgerstraat (now Jalan Pinangsia No. 30, Kota), changed its name into Yashima and moved to the building where ANETA was. Yashima changed name again into Domei.

The building was considered an important landmark in Indonesian history. After the Indonesian declaration of independence by Sukarno, Adam Malik broadcast the message through Antara radio without passing the Japanese censorship Hondokan.

At the time of the first Dutch Military Aggression (1947) after the expulsion of Japan from Indonesia, the Dutch offered the building to Apotheek Van Gorkom until 1961, when it was reused by Antara news agency again. Later, the building was used for Antara's Institute of Journalism (Lembaga Pendidikan Jurnalistik Antara) while the rear side of the building was used for the printing of internal purpose. On April 4, 1959, the Indonesian Ministry of Education and Culture Wiyono announced the building as Jakarta's heritage building.

== Architecture ==
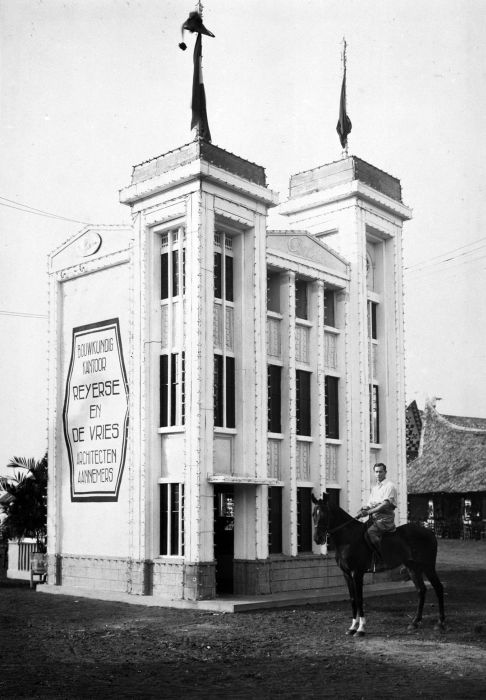
A miniature of the building featured in 1923 Pasar Gambir fair.

The building was designed in tropical Art Deco. It has a clock face and two prominent towers with lightning rod. The two meter main door is made of iron. Concrete stairs covered in brown ceramic tiles connect the building's three floors.

After years of deterioration and abandonment, the building was revitalized in 2019, with the renovation process finished in 2022.

== See also ==
- Indonesian architecture
- New Indies Style

== Literature ==
- Cribb, Robert; Kahin, Audrey (2004). Historical Dictionary of Indonesia. Historical Dictionaries of Asia, Oceania, and the Middle East (2nd ed.). Lanham, M.D.: Scarecrow Press. ISBN 978-0-8108-4935-8.
- "East Indies Denial". The Mercury. Hobart, Tas.: National Library of Australia. 21 August 1941. p. 3.
- Maters, Mirjam (1998). Van Zachte Wenk tot Harde Hand: Persvrijheid en Persbreidel in Nederlands-Indië, 1906–1942 [From Gentle Hint to Harsh Action: The Press and "Persbreidel" in the Dutch East Indies, 1906–1942] (in Dutch). Hilversum: Uitgeverij Verloren. ISBN 978-90-6550-596-5.
