= Johan Maurits Mohr =

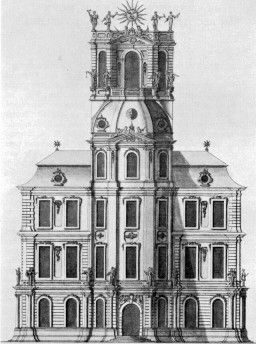
Mohr observatory in Batavia (Dutch East Indies).

Johan Maurits Mohr (ca. 18 August 1716, Eppingen – 25 October 1775, Batavia) was a Dutch-German pastor who studied at Groningen University from 1733 and settled in Batavia (Dutch East Indies) in 1737. Mohr's greatest passion was in astronomy but he was also keenly interested in meteorology and in vulcanology.

In 1765 Mohr built a large private observatory in Batavia that was equipped with the best astronomical instruments of his time. His observatory, which had cost him a small fortune, was visited and praised by Louis Antoine de Bougainville and James Cook.

Mohr observed the Venus transits of 6 June 1761 and 3 June 1769 and the Mercury transit of 10 November 1769. He also made meteorological observations and measurements of the magnetic declination at Batavia.

After Mohr's death, his observatory was damaged by an earthquake in 1780, fell into ruin and was demolished in 1812.

The minor planet 5494 Johanmohr is named in his honour.

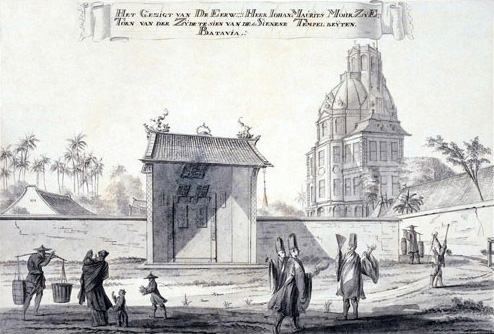
Mohr's observatory from Batavia's Chinese temple.

== See also ==
- List of colonial buildings and structures in Jakarta
