= Gereja Paulus Jakarta =

Protestant church in Indonesia

Coordinates: 6°12′2″S 106°49′53″E

GPIB Paulus Jakarta
- Gereja Paulus
- Gereja Paulus in 2026

- Location in Indonesia
- Location: Jakarta
- Country: Indonesia
- Denomination: Calvinism
- Website: http://gpibpaulusjakarta.org/

History
- Former name(s): Nassaukerk (1936-1942); Gereja Menteng (1942-1948)
- Status: Church
- Founded: 6 June 1936
- Founder: De Protestantse Kern in Nederlandsche-Indie

Architecture
- Functional status: Active
- Heritage designation: A (1993)
- Architect: F.J.L. Ghijsels
- Architectural type: Dutch Rationalist, New Indies Style
- Groundbreaking: 3 January 1936

Specifications
- Capacity: 600

Administration
- Diocese: Mupel Jakarta Pusat

Clergy
- Pastor(s): Rev. Johny Alexander Lontoh, M.Th.

The GPIB Paulus Jakarta, officially known as the Gereja Protestan di Indonesia Bagian Barat "Paulus", Jakarta (English: Paul's Protestant Church in West Indonesia, Jakarta), is a Reformed church located in Menteng, Jakarta, Indonesia.

== History ==
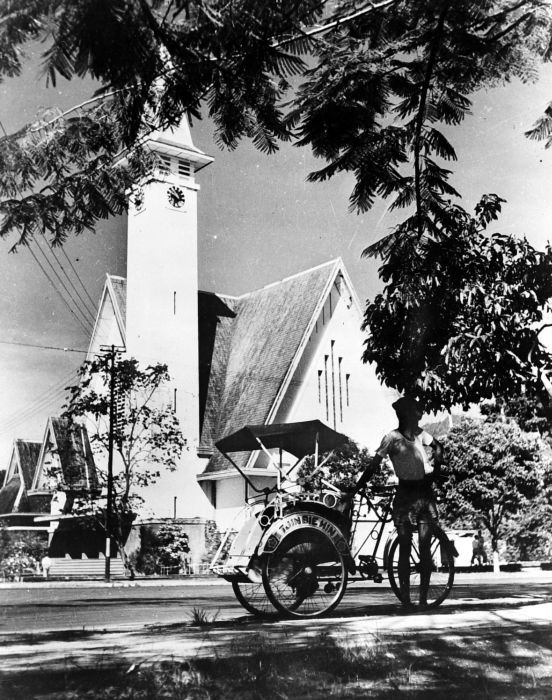
Menteng Church in the early 1950s.

The first laying of the foundation was done on 3 January 1936. The construction was complete within months and the following inauguration was held on Juni 6, 1936. The new church was named Nassaukerk.

During the Japanese occupation of the Dutch East Indies, the Church was renamed Gereja Menteng, ("Menteng Church"). During this period, the Japanese still allowed the Dutch priests to hold a mass until 1943, when the Dutch priests and the congregations were brought to internment camps. The mass itself was still held until it was banned sometimes later.

In October 1944, the Dutch language mass was replaced with Malay language, even though in reality it was still mixed with Dutch language. This condition continued until October 1945, when Indonesia proclaimed independence. After this, The church was renamed Nassaukerk again and the mass resumed in Dutch, but the desire to hold the mass in Indonesian language was apparent. At that time, there were only three Indonesian-speaking priests.

On October 31, 1948, the synod of Protestant Church in West Indonesia was formed. Nassaukerk was renamed Pauluskerk or Gereja Paulus (St. Paul's Church).

== Architecture ==
Gereja Paulus was designed by Frans Ghijsels of AIA bureau in New Indies Style, a branch of Dutch Rationalism that appeared in the Dutch Indies. It has a cross-shaped layout, symbolizing the four cardinal points. The dominant form of the church is its steeped roofs with skylights on each of the four facades.

The church building contains a spire with four original clock faces, still functioning, topped with a steeped roof.

== See also ==
- List of church buildings in Indonesia
- List of colonial buildings and structures in Jakarta
