= Ministry of Transportation Building, Jakarta =

Ministry of Transportation Building
- Gedung Kementerian Perhubungan
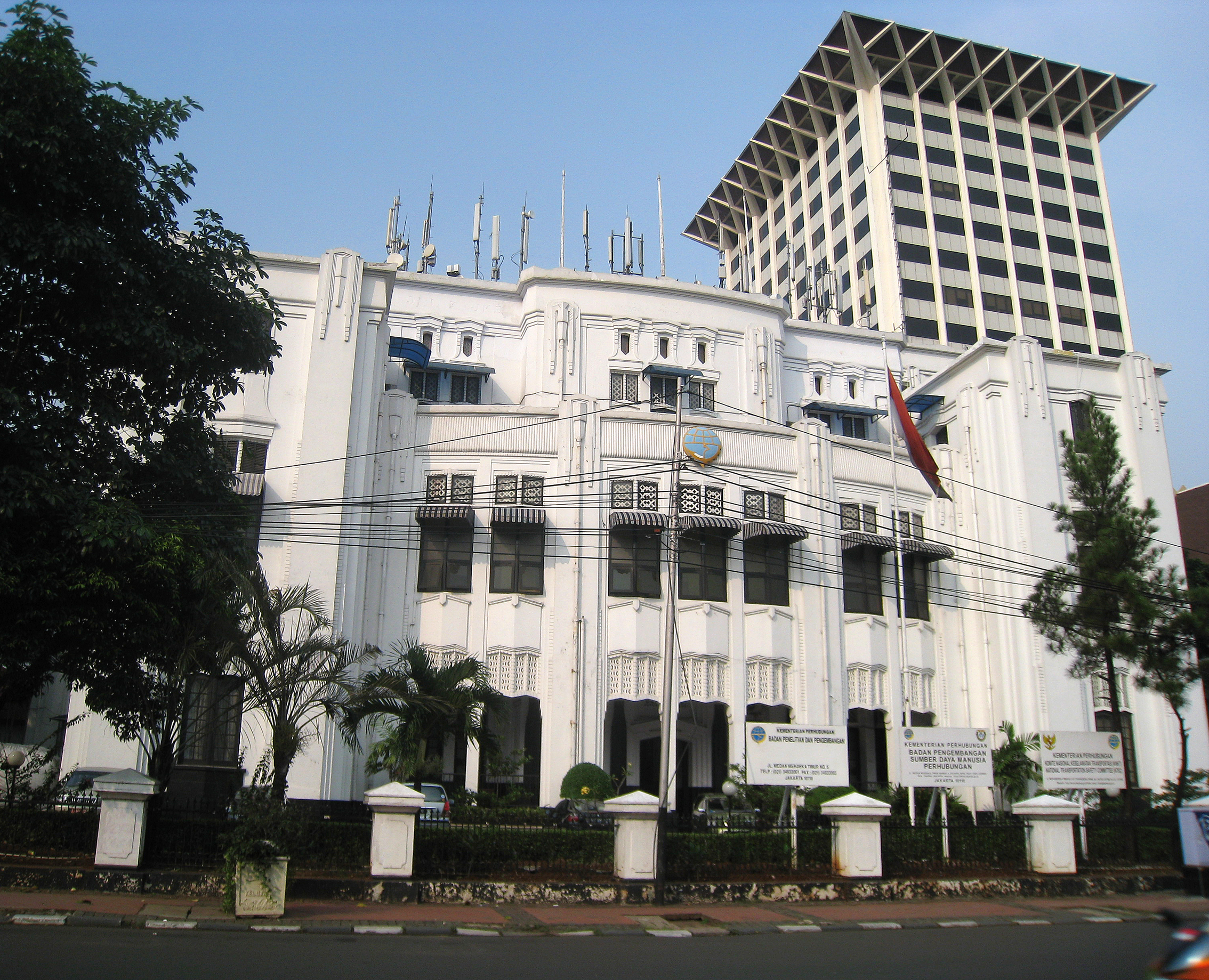
- The Indonesian Ministry of Transportation building.
- Interactive map of the Ministry of Transportation Building area
- Former names: Koninklijke Paketvaart-Maatschappij (original); Japanese Marine Department (1942)

General information
- Type: Government building
- Architectural style: New Indies Style, Art Deco
- Coordinates: 6.174917°S 106.830969°E
- Construction started: 1916
- Completed: 1918
- Owner: The Ministry of Transportation of Indonesia

Design and construction
- Architect: Frans J.L. Ghijsels
- Architecture firm: AIA Bureau
- Main contractor: AIA, Reyerse & de Vries

The Indonesian Ministry of Transportation Building is a historic building and a cultural property located in Jakarta, Indonesia. The building is currently the headquarter of the Indonesian Ministry of Transportation. The building, established as the headquarter of the Koninklijke Paketvaart-Maatschappij (KPM), was the first project of AIA Bureau, the biggest architecture consultant in the Dutch East Indies.

== History ==
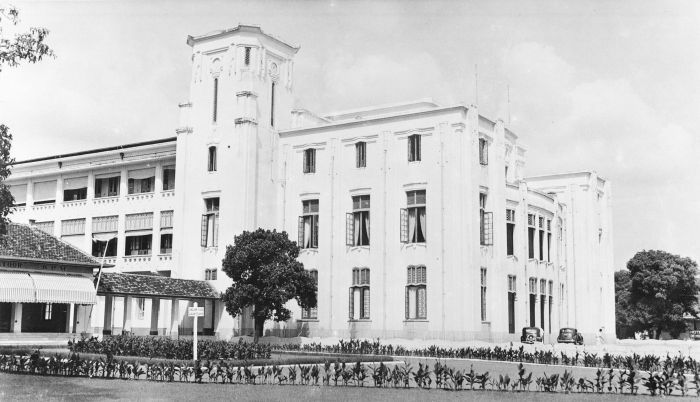
The building during the colonial period as the headquarter of the KPM shipping company.

In 1914, Frans Ghijsels designed the Petamboeran hospital for the KPM in Petamburan, Batavia, now Pelni Hospital Jakarta. In the same year, the shipping company also commissioned Ghijsels to design the new headquarter for the KPM on a plot of land at Koningplein Oost 5. This project led to the formation of the private architectural consultant AIA (Algemeen Ingenieurs- en Architectenbureau). Ghijsels established the AIA together with architect H. von Essen and contractor F. Stoltz.

The design of the building was prepared by Ghijsels in 1916. The construction of the building took two years in the period of 1917 to 1918. At its completion, the project for the headquarter of the KPM shipping company was considered a huge success and won critical acclaim. After the KPM headquarters project, AIA received many commissions for commercial buildings, making AIA Bureau the most successful architecture consultant in the Dutch East Indies.

During the early period of the World War II, in 1939, the "Protection of the Civilians against Air Attacks" department was formed to protect the civilians from possible air attacks by the Japanese. This department was under the auspices of the State Mobilization Council of the Dutch East Indies. The department formed 18 regional of protection circles within the Dutch East Indies, where Batavia and its surrounding fell under the Air Protection Circle I. The Air Protection Circle I was subdivided into seven sectors, each with several district observation posts known as the "air-watch post". The air-watch posts were set up on tall buildings in the city. In Batavia, the Factorij in the Benedenstad and the KPM Headquarter at the Koningsplein were set to become the air-watch post.

== Design ==
The KPM headquarter was designed as a four-storeyed Art Deco building. The building quality is monumental, displaying a symmetrical rigid facade design with a visible balcony on the third floor at the front facade. The building features two towers between the representation front offices. An inner courtyard and the open galleries provided enough cross ventilation for this Indies building, a design principle that would be the core concept of the New Indies Style.

The building was designed in Art Deco. The building is very monumental, displaying a rigid facade design with an attic third floor at the front.

== See also ==
- New Indies style
- Merdeka Square, Jakarta
- List of colonial buildings and structures in Jakarta

== Cited works ==
- Mahandis Yoanata Thamrin (January 10, 2016). "TRAILS OF GHIJSELS IN BATAVIA (3): KONINKLIJKE PAKETVAART MAATSCHAPPIJ (KPM)". My Odyssey. Wordpress.
- Merrillees, Scott (February 1, 2012). Greetings from Jakarta: Postcards of a Capital 1900-1950. Jakarta: Equinox Publishing. ISBN 9789793780887.
- Merrillees, Scott (2015). Jakarta: Portraits of a Capital 1950-1980. Jakarta: Equinox Publishing. ISBN 9786028397308.
- Vletter, M.E. de; Voskuil, R.P.G.A.; Diessen, J.R. van (1999). Batavia/Djakarta/Jakarta - Beeld van een Stad. Purmerend: Asia Maior. ISBN 9074861091.
