= Gasibu =

- Gasibu, Lapangan Gasibu, Diponegoro Field, Wilhelmina Plein
- Location in the city of Bandung

General information
- Type: Recreational and sports area
- Location: Bandung, Indonesia, Jalan Diponegoro
- Coordinates: 6.900306°S 107.618709°E
- Construction started: 1920
- Renovated: 1950 and 2016
- Cost: 16 billion IDR

Dimensions
- Diameter: 600m

Gasibu is a public area in Bandung, West Java, Indonesia. It was first built by the Dutch colonial government as an open space in front of Gedung Sate; the area was first known as Wilhelmina Plein in 1920. The area was named after the Queen of the Netherlands, Wilhelmina of the Netherlands. In the 1950s, the area was known as the Diponegoro field.

In 1955, the name Gasibu came from a soccer association where members were from the North Bandung community. Gasibu stands for North Bandung Indonesian Football Association. The ownership of the land has been controversial between the city of Bandung and private owners.

The sport area was renovated in 2015 for 16 billion rupiah.

It hosts regular artistic exhibitions, statues of former governors and a library.

== See also ==
- Architecture of Indonesia
- Bandung
