= Cirebon City Hall =

City hall in Cirebon City, Indonesia

- Balai Kota Cirebon
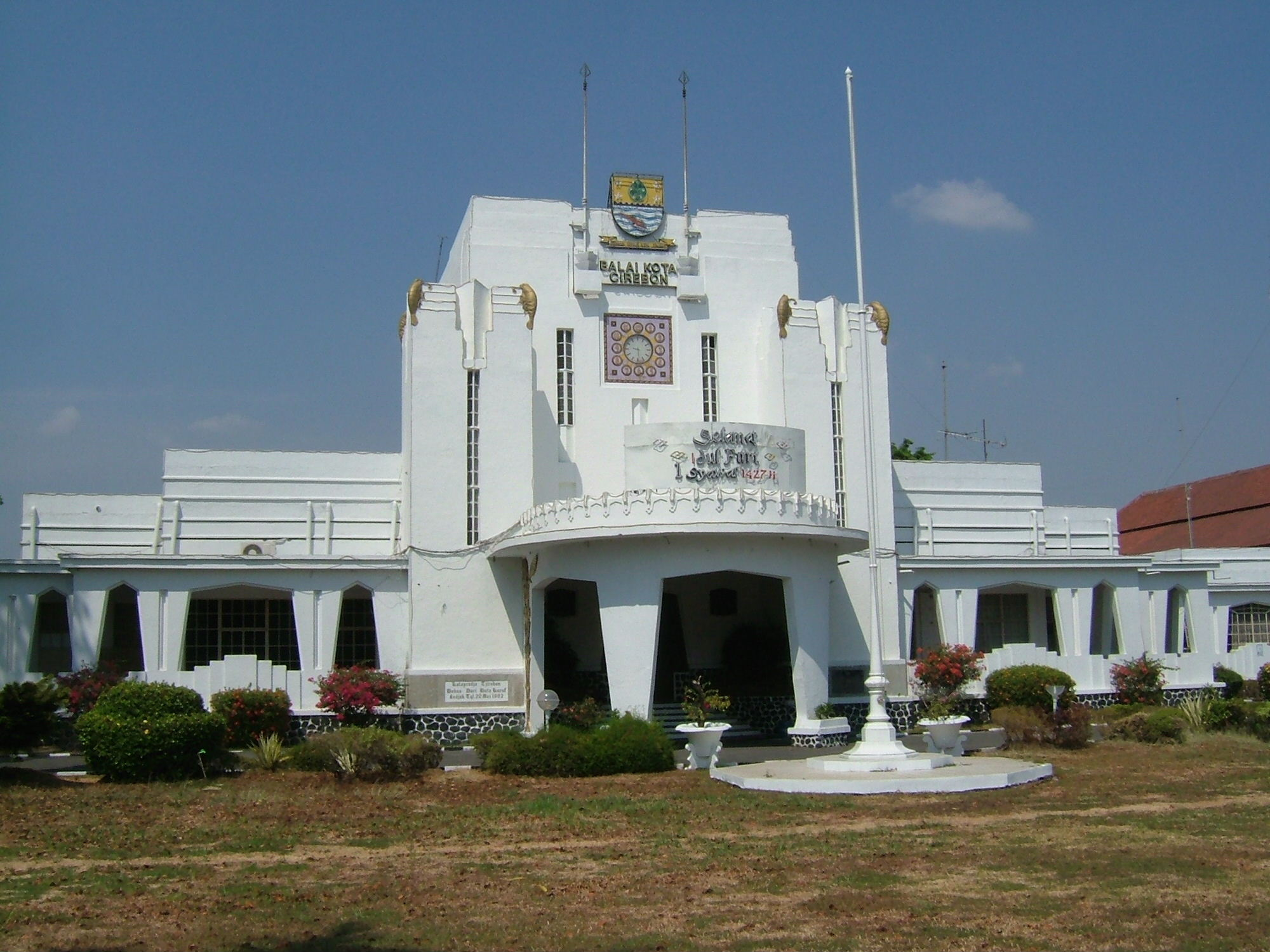
- Front facade of Cirebon City Hall
- Interactive map of the Cirebon City Hall area
- Former names: Raadhuis van de Gemeente Cheribon

General information
- Type: City hall
- Architectural style: Amsterdam School, Art Deco
- Location: Jalan Siliwangi No. 84, Cirebon City, West Java, Indonesia
- Coordinates: 6.707002°S 108.557767°E
- Completed: September 1, 1927

Design and construction
- Architect: Joost Jacob Jiskoot

Cirebon City Hall (Indonesian Balai Kota Cirebon) is a city hall in Cirebon City, West Java, Indonesia. The building shows implementation of the Dutch Amsterdam School Style in the colonial Dutch East Indies, now Indonesia.

== History ==
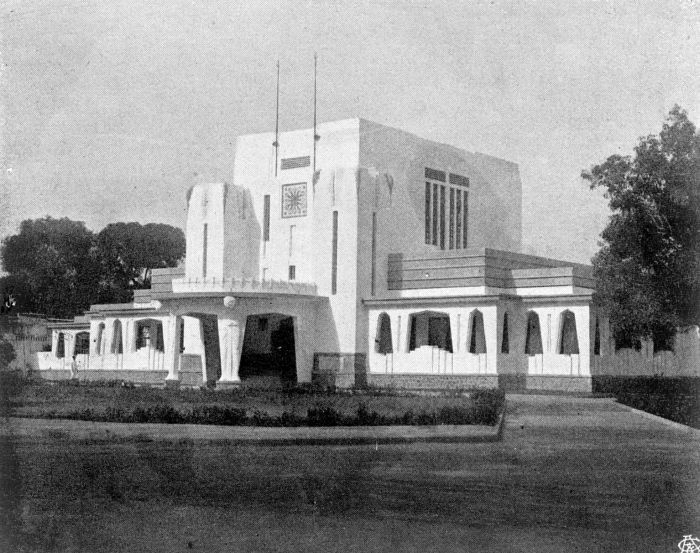
1927 photo of Cirebon City Hall

Cirebon City Hall was designed by Joost Jacob Jiskoot (1896–1987) in Art Deco with a strong influence of Amsterdam School style. Other sources state the architects were H.P. Hamdl and C.F.H. Koll. The foundation stone was laid on June 26, 1926. The physical construction of the building began on July 1, 1926 and was completed on September 1, 1927. It was used for the town hall of the colonial city of Cheribon (also Cirebon) from 1927. It was also used for meetings and weddings by the Europeans during the colonial period.

During the Japanese Military Administration until the time of independence, the building became the center for Cirebon City Government.

== Architecture ==
The City Hall building has three separate buildings consisting of a main building and companion buildings on the left wing and right wing. At the front of the main building is a semicircular portico. Various stained glass ornaments and lamp decorations show the influence of Nieuwe Kunst and the Amsterdam School. The facade of the building is decorated with prawn sculptures designed by sculptor Anthon Maas, a reference to the city's thriving shrimp industry as well as the nickname of the city 'Kota Udang' ("shrimp city").

The Art Deco building shows strong influence of Amsterdam School movement, evident in the strong expressionist shapes in the sculptural ornaments and the expressive tapered form in the double facade (double facade is characteristic of the tropical architecture), and use of original material.

== Joost Jacob Jiskoot ==
Jiskoot was the director of Cirebon City's Department of Public Works in 1924. During the Japanese occupation of the Dutch East Indies (Indonesia), he was the chief for Batavia (Jakarta)-based engineering and construction company Associatie Selle & de Bruyn, Reyerse & de Vries. During this period, he designed the residence of the mayor of Makassar (Ujung Pandang).

In the later period, he was recorded establishing the engineering and construction company Associatie NV Djakarta in 1949. The company existed until 1957, when all businesses in Indonesia were nationalized.

== See also ==
- Indonesian architecture
- New Indies Style
