= Frans Johan Louwrens Ghijsels =

Dutch architect (1882–1947)

Frans Johan Louwrens Ghijsels (8 September 1882 in Tulungagung – 2 March 1947 in Overveen, Bloemendaal) was a Dutch architect and urban planner who worked in the Netherlands and the Dutch Indies. Ghijsels was the founder of AIA, the biggest architecture consultant in the Dutch Indies. He was one of the instrumental architects in developing a modern style characteristic of the Dutch Indies.

== Biography ==
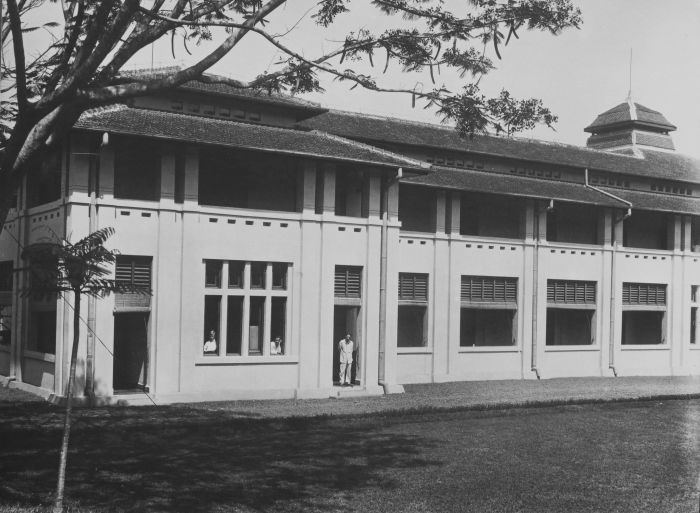
KPM Hospital (now Pelni Petamburan Hospital), was one of the first projects of Ghijsels before the formation of the AIA architecture bureau.

In the year 1903, Ghijsels studied at the polytechnic in Delft, where some of his fellow students included several future East Indies architects, Thomas Karsten and Henri Maclaine Pont among them. After his academic study, in 1909, his first appointment was as a government architectural supervisor in Amsterdam under the firm of GA van Arkel (1910). In the same year, he married Johanna Elisabeth Antonia de Regt in Rotterdam. By the end of September 1910, Ghijsels was accepted for the post of engineer by the Department of Municipal Works in Batavia, so he returned to the Dutch East Indies. From 1913, he worked for the Department of Civil Works (Burgerlijke Openbare Werken (BOW)), as well as became a freelance architect. Between 1913 and 1915, he designed the three-storeyed Post, Telephone, and Telegraph office building (Post-, Telegrafie- en Telefoonkantoor (PTT)) in Surabaya, now Gedung Telkom; the building was one of the pioneers of modern architecture in Surabaya. He also designed the Post, Telephone, and Telegraph Office on the site of the 1914 Colonial Exhibition in Semarang. In the same year, Ghijsels designed the Petamboeran hospital for the Royal Packet Company (Koninklijke Paketvaart Maatschappij (KPM)) in Batavia, now Pelni Petamburan hospital Jakarta. KPM also commissioned Ghijsels to design the headquarters for the KPM, which led to the formation of the private architectural consultant AIA (Algemeen Ingenieurs- en Architectenbureau), together with architect H. von Essen and contractor F. Stoltz. The AIA was considered one of the biggest architecture consultant in the Dutch East Indies, with a building contractor. The agency expanded in 1927 with an office in Surabaya. In 1932, the AIA bureau created an associate with another office in Bandung, led by architect FW Brinkman and GH Voorhoeve.

Ghijsels was a key figure of AIA until 1929, when he had to depart aboard the SS Hooft to Genoa (May 30, 1928) and then the Netherlands. He remained committed to AIA where he worked from distance several of projects in the Dutch East Indies. During the 1930s, Ghijsels made several sketches for his own house and a clubhouse for the Bloemendaal Hockeyclub (now HC Bloemendaal, July 1935). Ghijsels died on March 2, 1947, in Overveen.

== AIA ==
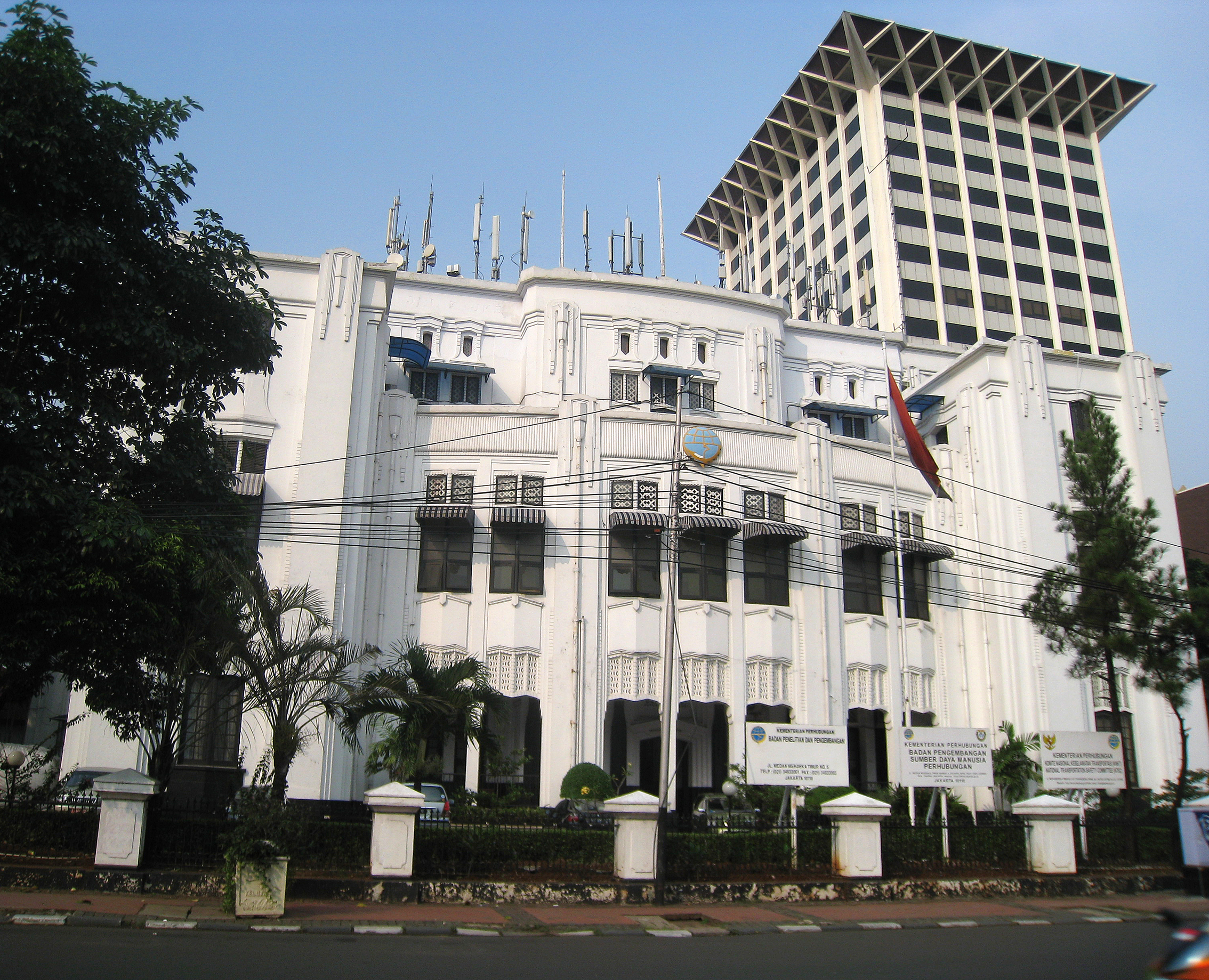
The KPM Headquarters, now building of the Indonesian Ministry of Transportation, the first most acclaimed work of Ghijsels.

The first project of AIA is the headquarters of KPM in Batavia (now the building of the Indonesian Ministry of Transportation). The project was a huge success and won critical acclaim. After the KPM headquarters project, AIA received many commissions for commercial buildings.

Other AIA AIA'st famous works are the Kota railway station and Hotel des Indes (demolished in 1972) in Batavia. In Surabaya, he designed the Internatio Building for the Internationale Crediet- en Handelsvereniging Rotterdam. The hospital Onder de Bogen in Yogyakarta is one of the best example of a more Indies style. In Bandung, Villa Isola of press magnate Dominique W. Beretty, was designed by Schoemaker who was affiliated with AIA. AIA also received big commissions for the hydraulic works after it had been associated with the firm Sitsen and Louzada in 1936.

Other architects affiliated with AIA were HA Hes (1918–1930), FBH Asselbergs (1921–1931) and NE Burhoven Jaspers (1927–1938). Stoltz left the agency in 1921, while Hein von Essen had already left. From 1945, the office was led by Indonesian engineers Tan and Soetono. Today, the office still exist in Surabaya, under the old name: PT Biro AIA.

== Style ==
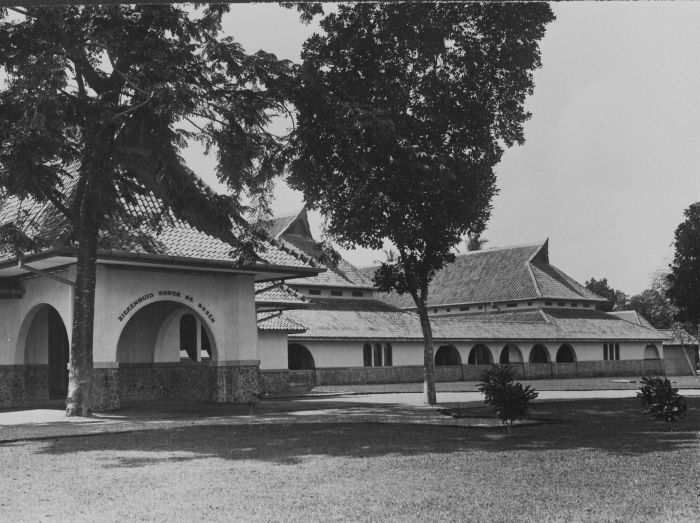
Onder de Bogen hospital (now Panti Rapih Hospital) one of few Ghijsels work where he reveals strong Indies form, apparent in the roof form.

In the beginning of the 20th century, there were two major groups of Modern architects in the Dutch Indies: those who followed the western architectural tradition in which they had been trained, and those that sought to achieve a synthesis of western and traditional Indies style. Ghijsels is definitely from the first - less Indies, more western - group, however it was known that Ghijsels made a separation between a more "formal" style for office and commercial projects, while choosing "informal" Indies style for schools and hospitals. Some of Ghijsels more Indies style are Onder de Bogen hospital (now Panti Rapih Hospital) and KPM hospital (now Pelni Petamburan Hospital). This distinction that he invented contributed to a theoretical discussion about the importance of the colonial Indies style.

The Dutch East Indies newspaper De Indische Courant on December 16, 1925, quoted "simplicity is the shortest path to beauty" (Eenvoud is de kortste weg naar schoonheid) to Ghijsels' work. The quote clearly described Ghijsels' clean Modernist style.

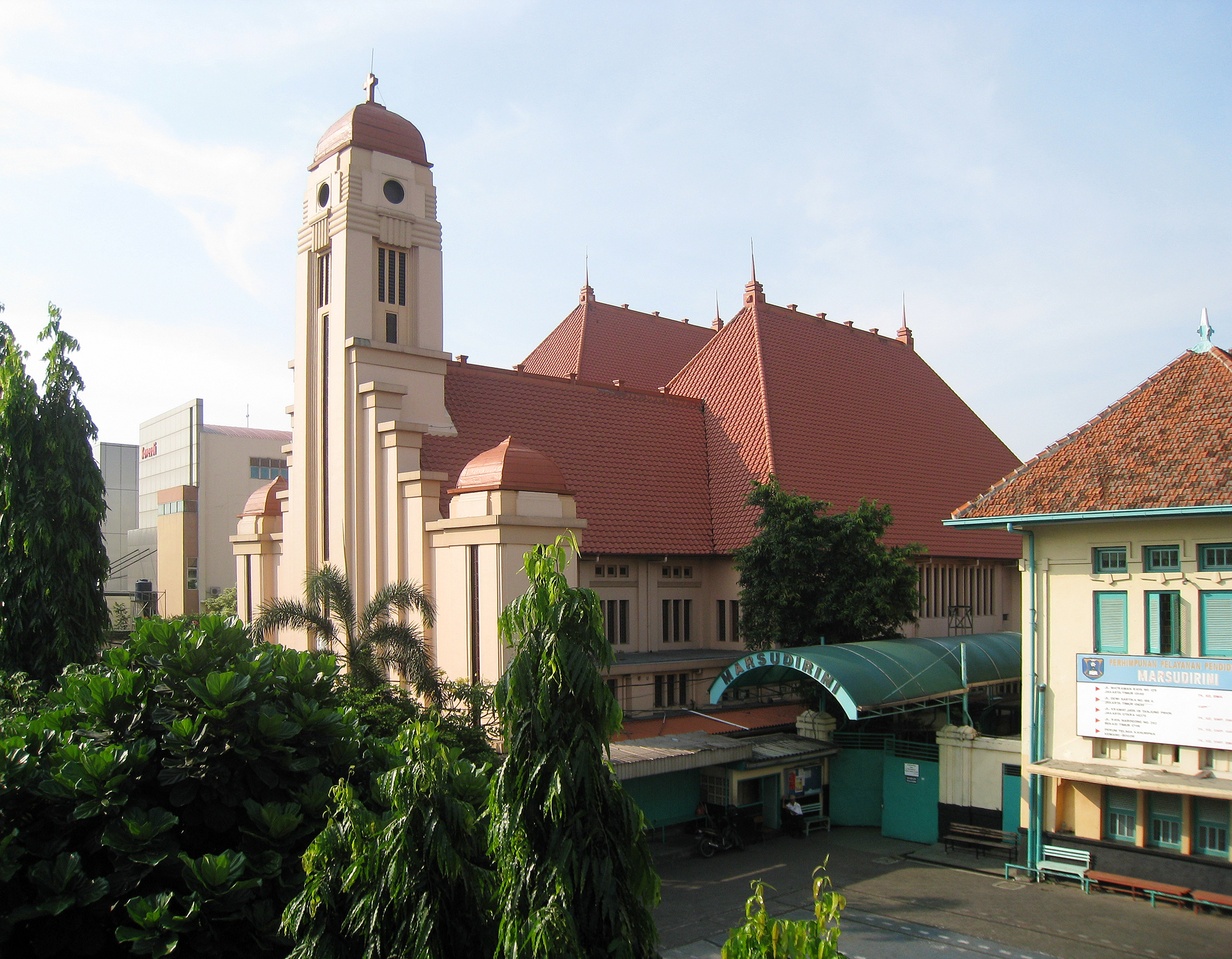
St. Joseph's Church, Jakarta (1920s)

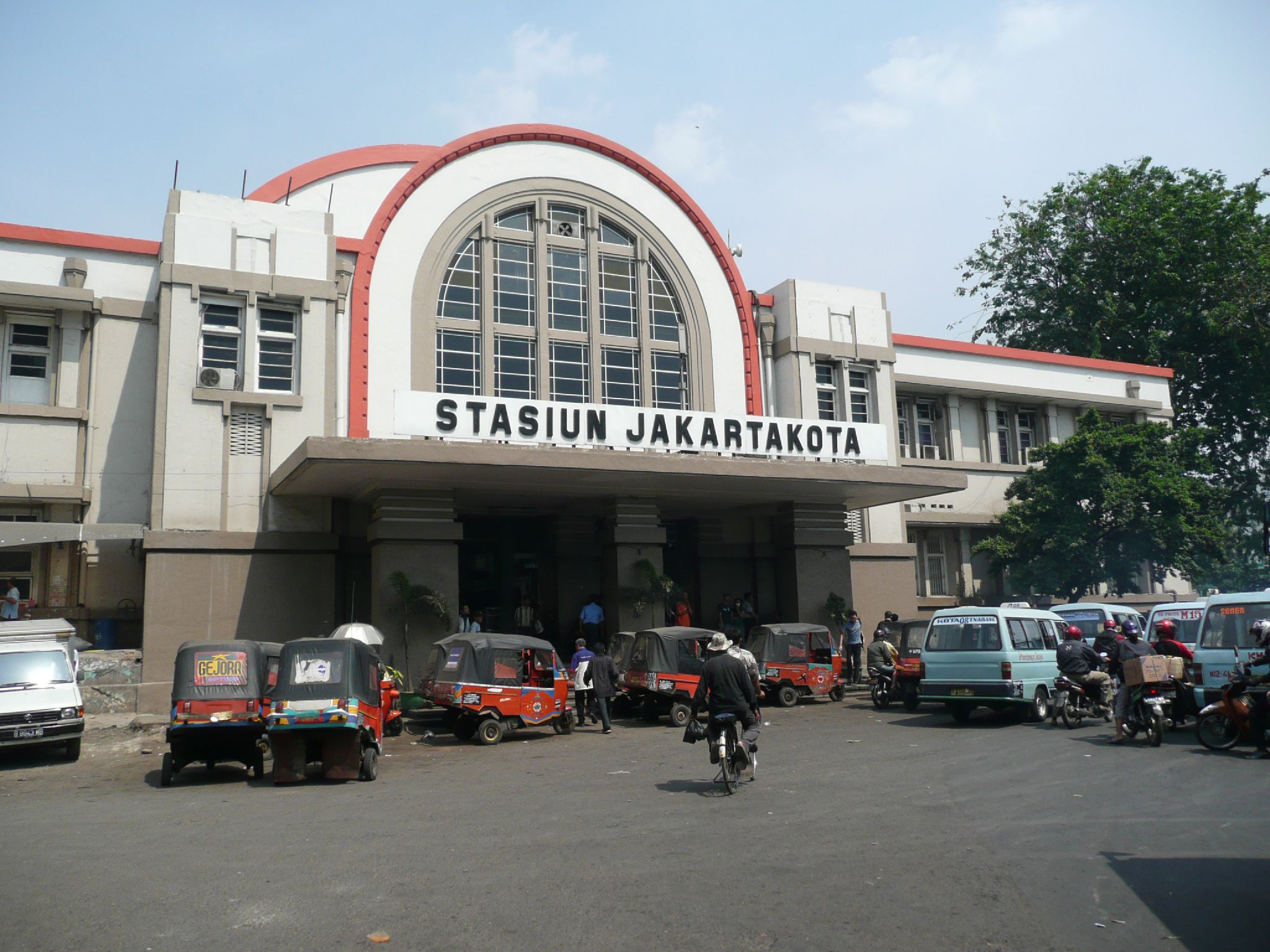
Kota Railway Station, Jakarta (1926)

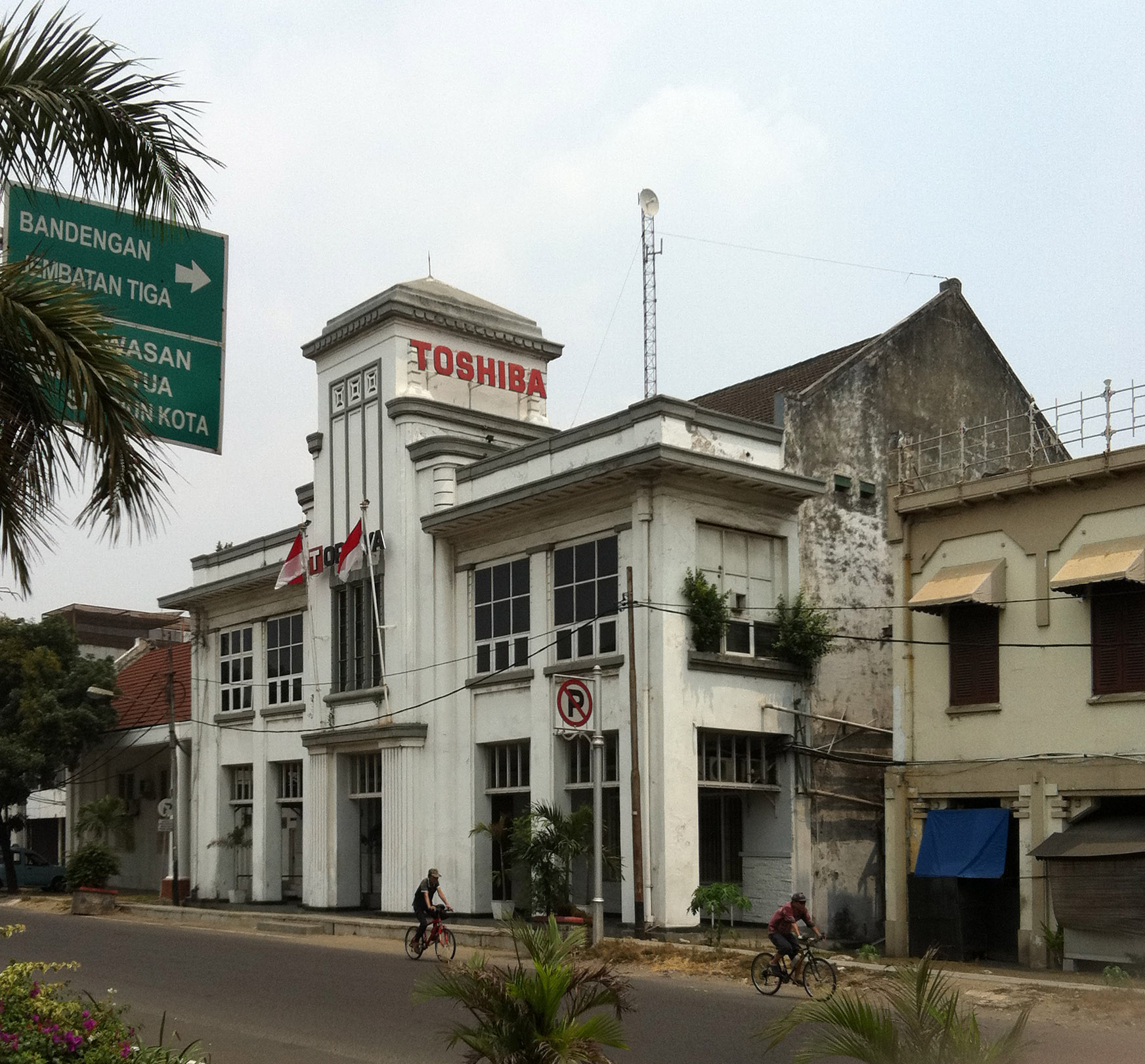
Toshiba Office, Kota, Jakarta (1920s)

== List of buildings ==
In the book ‘Indische Bouwkunst’ more them thirty buildings designed by Ghijsels are mentioned. This book has been translated into Bahasa Indonesia and is available as a free download.

Below is the list of buildings designed by Ghijsels in Jakarta:

- KPM Hospital Petamboeran (1914–15) - now RS PELNI
- KPM Head Office (1917–18) - now Kantor Departemen Perhubungan Laut in Jl. Medan Merdeka Selatan
- Office of John Peet & Co. (1920) - now PT Toshiba Jl. Kalibesar Barat
- Office of Maintz & Co. (1920) - now PT Samudera Indonesia Jl Kalibesar Barat
- Roman Catholic Church H. Jozef (1923) - St. Joseph's Church at Jl. Matraman Raya No. 129, East Jakarta.
- Office of Geo Wehry & Co (1926) - now a building in Jl. Kunir No.2
- Bataviaasch Nieuwsblad (1927) - demolished, Jl. Pintu Air
- Lodge for Freemasons (1925) - now BAPPENAS Jl. Taman Suropati
- Training College ”Vereeniging Associatie van Oost & West (1918) – Jl. Gunung Sahari
- Boarding School: Jan Pieterz. Coentichting (1923–27) – Jl Sultan Agung, Menteng Pulo
- School Complex for the Association of Christian Schools (1927) – now SMA Jl. Diponegoro
- Station BEOS (1929)
- Hotel des Indes (1930) – demolished, Duta Merlin stands on its site
- Club House for Roemer Visscher Society (1928) – Cikini
- Tjikini Swimming Pool (1925)
- Renovation Plan of Societeit Harmonie (1928)– demolished 1985
- Parts of Municipal Urban Development in Menteng (1920)
- Nassau church (1936) – now St. Paul's Church, Jakarta

== See also ==
- Colonial architecture of Indonesia
- List of colonial buildings and structures in Jakarta
- New Indies Style
