= New Indies style =

Architectural style in Dutch East Indies

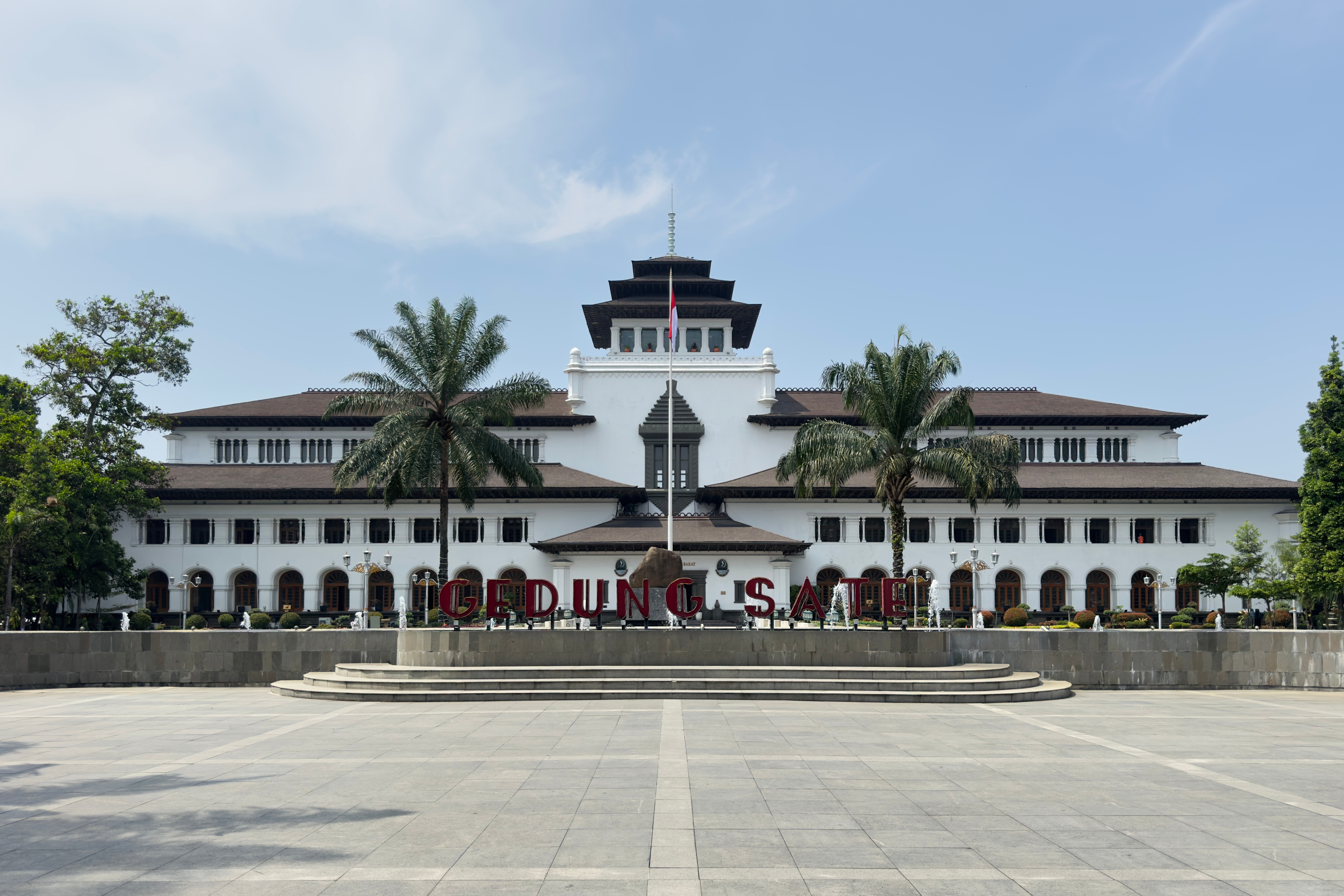
- New Indies style in Gedung Sate, showing local indigenous form in modernist building
- Years active: late 19th century–20th century (pre-World War II)
- Location: Dutch East Indies
- Influences: Rationalism, Art Deco, with an element of Indonesian traditional architecture.

New Indies style (Dutch: Nieuwe Indische bouwstijl) is a modern architectural style used in the Dutch East Indies (now Indonesia) between the late 19th century through pre-World War II 20th century. New Indies style is basically early modern (western) architecture (e.g. Rationalism and Art Deco), which applies local architectural elements such as wide eaves or prominent roof as an attempt to conform with the tropical climate of Indonesia.

Even though New Indies style refers specifically to the Dutch Rationalism movement that appeared in 1910s Indonesia, for the purpose of covering the many architectural styles that appeared during the brief early modern period, the term is used as a general term for all the architectural styles that appear between the late 19th-century to pre-World War II 20th-century.

== History ==
The attempt to synthesize Dutch architecture with local Indonesian architecture had already started during the 18th century. Heavy maintenance of the 17th-century Dutch-style buildings in the tropics had forced the Dutch to follow examples from indigenous architecture of Indonesia. The attempt first appears in the Dutch Indies country houses of the 18th and 19th century, a style academically known as Indo-European style (Indo-Europese bouwstijl) or Indies style (Indische bouwstijl), also Old Indies style (Oud-Indische bouwstijl) to distinguish it from the newer style.

The birth of the New Indies style was related with the introduction of new building material, the rise of Modernism and the introduction of the Agrarian Law of 1870 in Java. The new law opened Java to foreigners, enabling them to establish private enterprises in the Dutch East Indies. A new type of buildings, developments and standards have to be implemented in the Dutch East Indies. The colonial government, under the Department of Civil Public Works (Departement der Burgerlijke Openbare Werken), developed new standards for the construction of buildings such as hospitals, schools, town halls, post offices, and other public utilities to consider the local (tropical) climate as means to reduce the cost of building construction and maintenance. One of the earliest examples is the Harbour Master's Office in Semarang, an early 19th-century example.

Also influencing the New Indies style were new generation of Dutch architects, trained in the Netherlands, who went to the Indies to introduce Modernism. In the 1910s, Dutch architects began experimenting with new material on traditional Dutch forms while developing a tropical-friendly architecture, bridging the evolution of architecture between the traditionalists and modernists in the Dutch East Indies.

The 1920s and 1930s saw the advent of Modernism in the Dutch East Indies. Typical features included flat roofs and cubic forms, with minimal consideration of the tropics. Art Deco ornamentation was sometimes incorporated into the design. Albert Aalbers was one of the representatives of the Modernist movement in Indonesia before World War II. His work is characterized by its clean-cut, functionalist elevations, which often feature curved lines, and the absence of external ornamentation and other purely decorative devices.

In the same period, nationalism manifested in the quest for a new style of architecture – one that reflected the cultural identity of the region. Some architects began to temper the Modernist ethos by including indigenous architectural elements, thereby creating a distinctively Indonesian style of modern architecture. Henri Maclaine Pont and Thomas Karsten were the leading exponents here.

== Architecture ==
The term New Indies style refers specifically to the type of architecture which appeared in the 1910s Dutch East Indies. During the brief transitional period in early 20th century, the style coexisted with other Modern architectural variants in the Dutch East Indies: Art Deco, Expressionism, Nieuwe Zakelijkheid, etc. The styles represent technological progress during the brief pre-World War II period.

=== New Indies style ===
In Indonesia, the term New Indies style is an academically-accepted term for Dutch Rationalism. Similar to Dutch Rationalism, the style is the result of the attempt to develop new solutions to integrate traditional precedents (Classicism) with new technological possibilities. It can be described as a transitional style between traditionalists (the Indies Empire style) and the modernists. In the Netherlands, the style was strongly influenced by the design of H. P. Berlage; this is reflected in Indonesia as well.

Characteristically, New Indies style is similar with Dutch Rationalism with its use of Romanesque-inspired arches while keeping the regularity of traditional Classicist form. The form began to show functional approach; decorations are reduced. Differences with the Western version is that in the Dutch East Indies, buildings are white-washed, contrasting the dominant brickwork of its Dutch counterpart. Other differences is the exaggerated roof eaves which form a significant overhang which protects any opening, a style that did not appear in the Dutch counterpart.

New Indies style employed the use of the 'double facade' concept which manifested in a covered gallery. The covered gallery is implemented not only in the ground level but also at the second floor. Double facade protects the facade from heavy rainfall and strong sunlight, an important feature of tropical design. Extensive openings in the form of multiple doors or high windows were done to allow cross ventilation to cool the interior.

Features of New Indies style

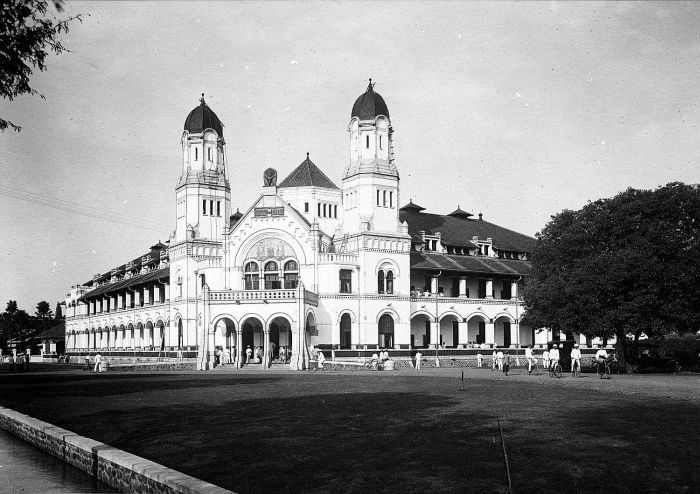
Front facade of Lawang Sewu shows traditional forms inspired by Romanesque arches, but with less Classicist, more functional elements

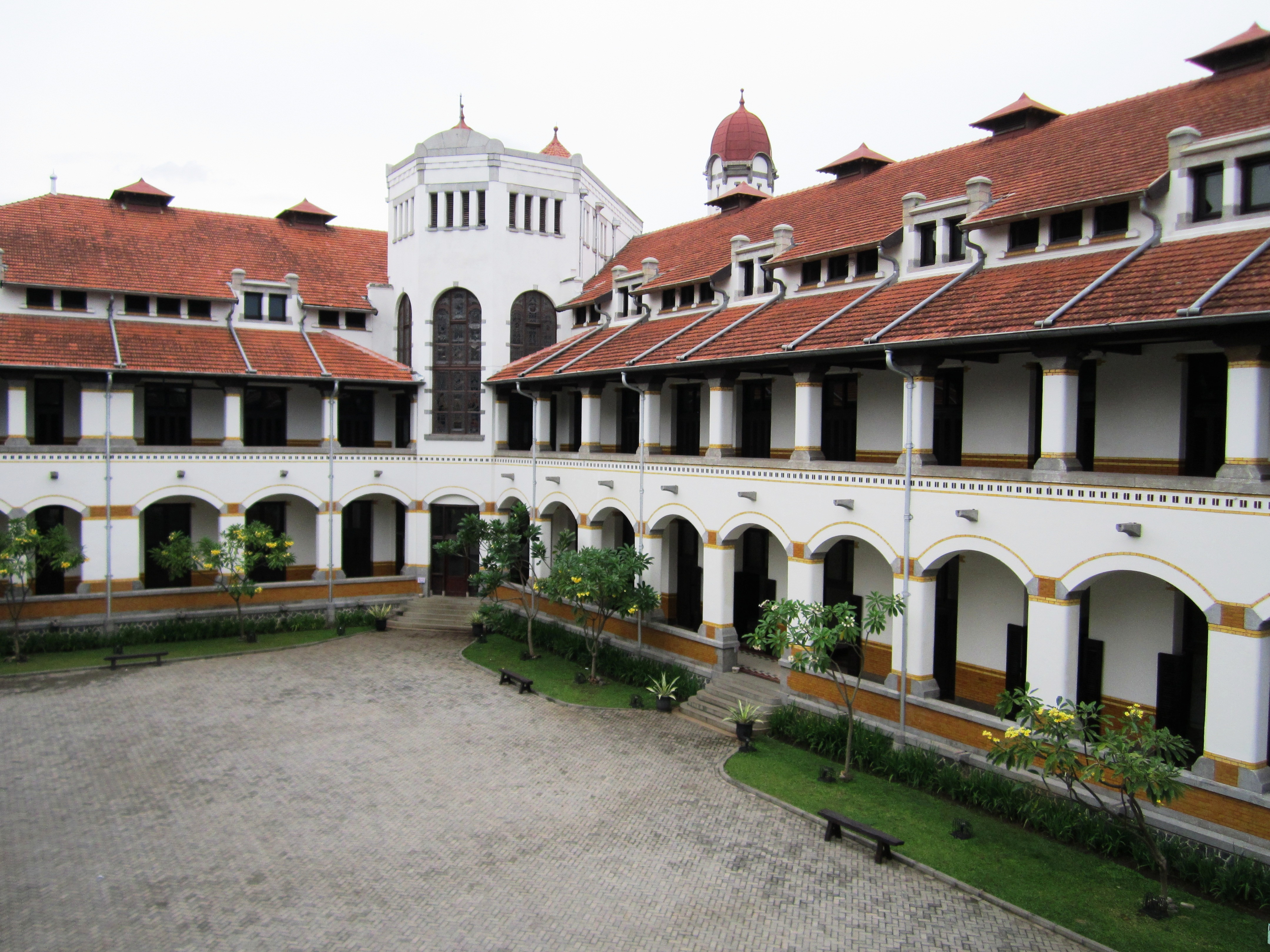
The rear side of Lawang Sewu shows the use of double facade and generous roof eaves, a feature in tropical architecture

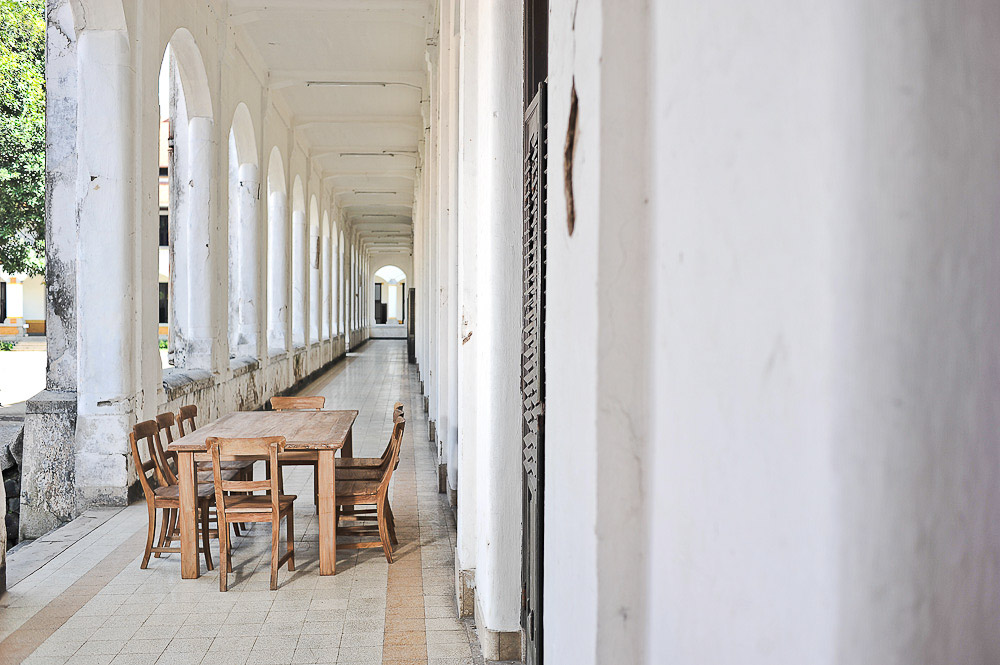
A gallery formed by the double facade in Lawang Sewu. The extra space protects the actual facade of the building from monsoon rainfall and strong sunlight

Several examples of building from this period are Cosman Citroen's Lawang Sewu (1907), Piet Moojen's Kunstkring Art Gallery (1913) and Cirebon Kejaksan Station (1912).

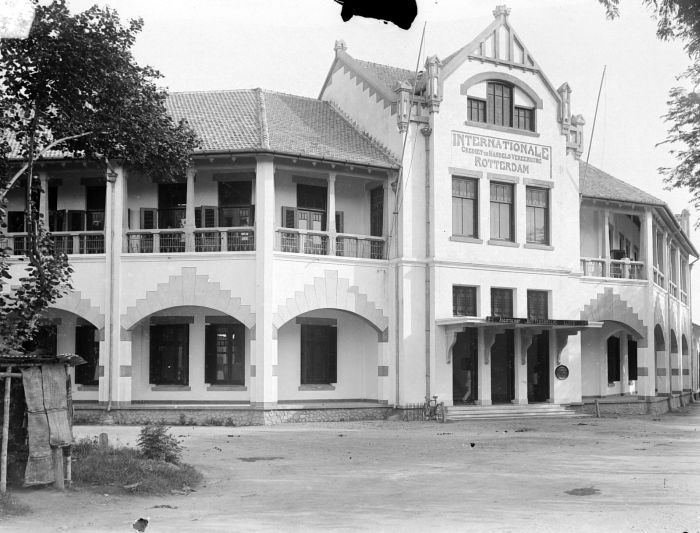
An office building in Semarang

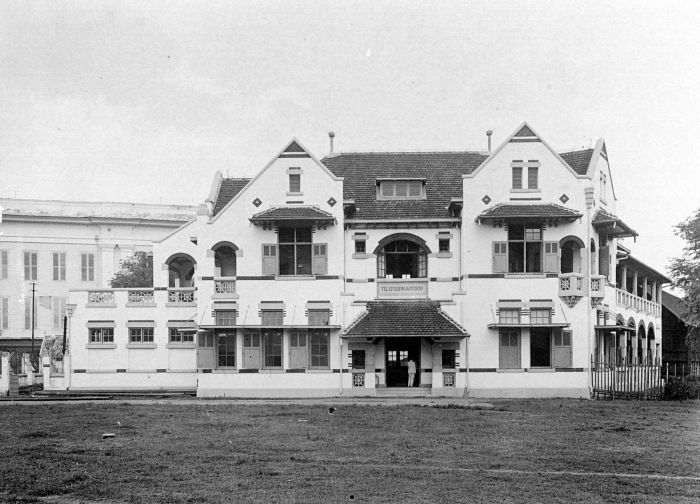
Telephone office in Semarang

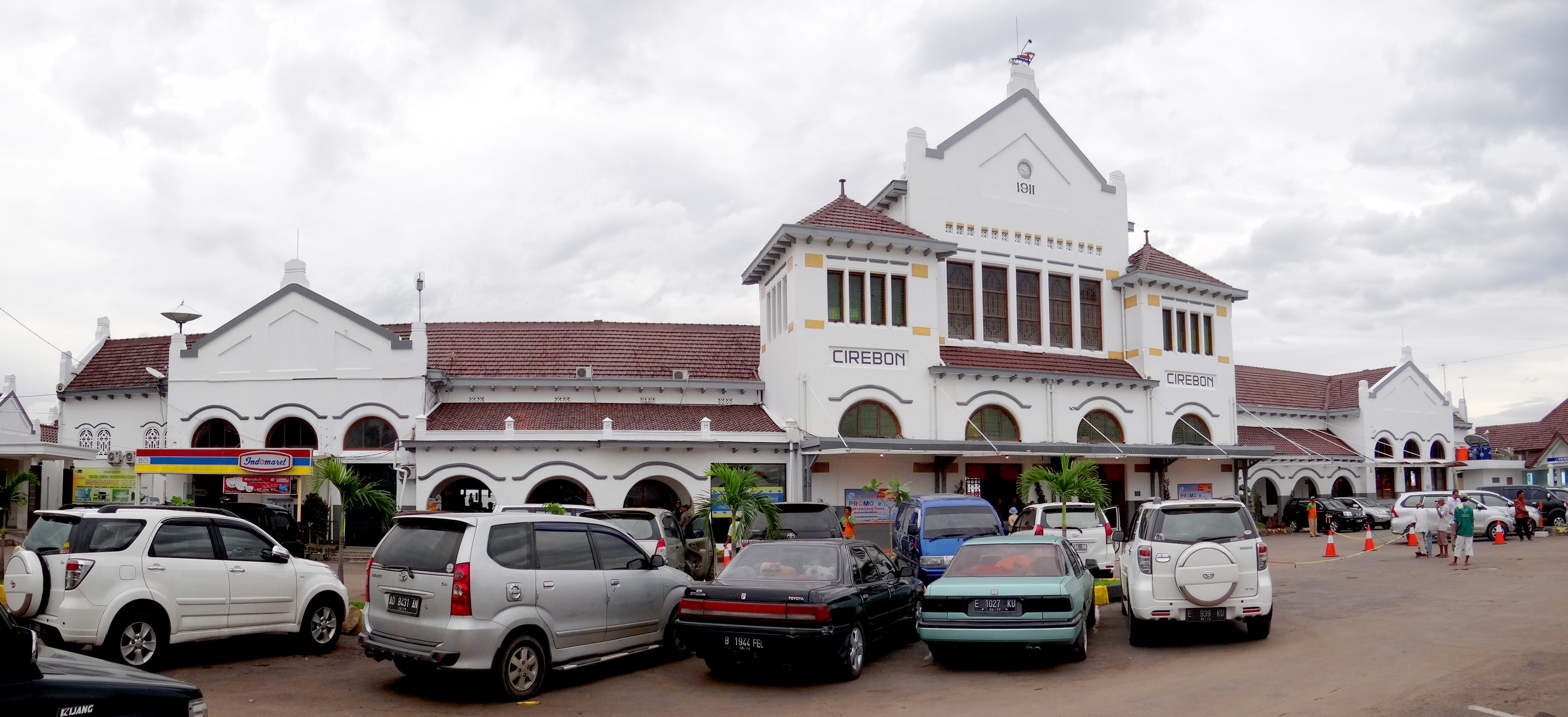
Cirebon Kejaksan Station (1912)

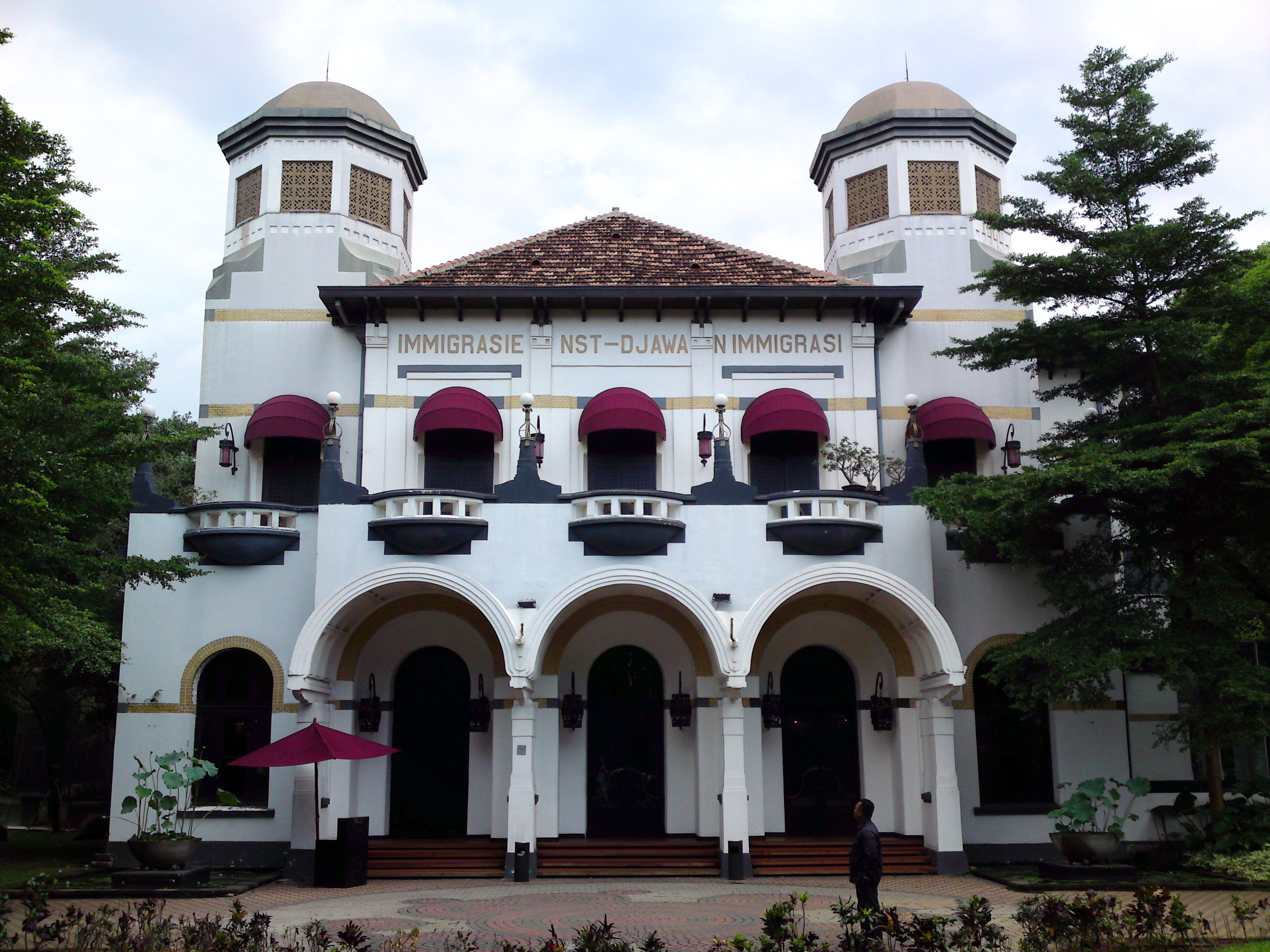
Kunstkring Art Gallery (1913)

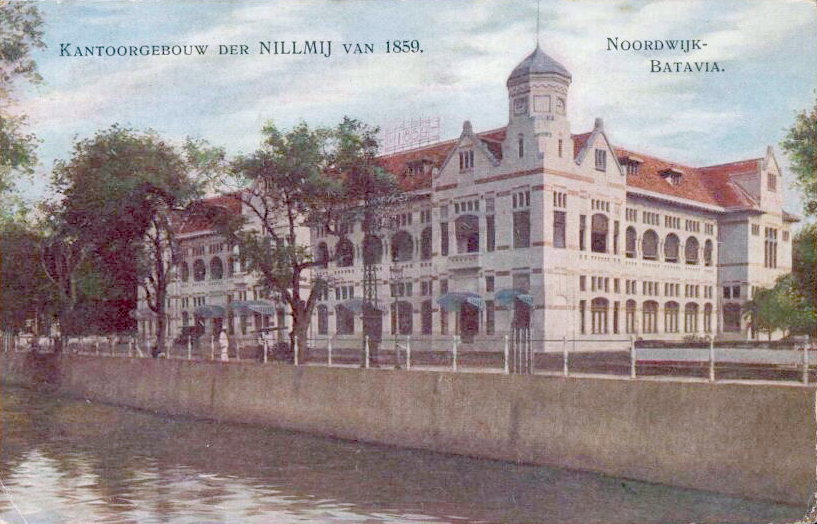
Moojen's NILLMIJ office (1909), now partly demolished to make way for road construction

=== Art Deco and Nieuwe Bouwen ===
Art Deco in the Dutch East Indies was similarly influenced with Art Deco in the Netherlands. Art Deco evolved from earlier Berlage-type Rationalism. Characteristic include rich color, bold geometric shapes and ornamentation. The form is symmetrical and exudes technological progress and glamour. One of the earliest example of Art Deco appear in the design of the Semarang Poncol Station (1914). Examples of building of this style are Ghijsels's former KPM headquarters (1917) and Wolff Schoemaker's Jaarbeurs (1920). Gerber's Gedung Sate shows consideration of local architect in the form of its roof.

Another variation in the period is the Amsterdam School, a part of the international movement of Expressionism which appears around the 1920s as well. The style popularity is not as widespread as in the Netherlands, but influenced details of buildings in the Dutch East Indies. A form of Amsterdam School appear in Cirebon City Hall (1926) by J.J. Jiskoot with its expressive distorted form characteristic of Amsterdam School style. Amsterdam School influence also appear in buildings designed by Schoemaker who often collaborates with sculptors: The expressive relief of Grand Hotel Preanger (1929) and the sculptures of Bandung Jaarbeurs (1920).

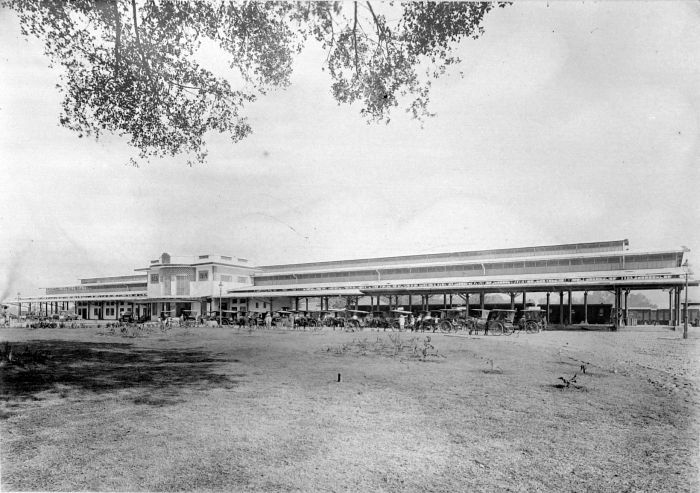
Semarang Poncol Station during its opening in 1914 shows one of the first form of Art Deco in the Dutch Indies

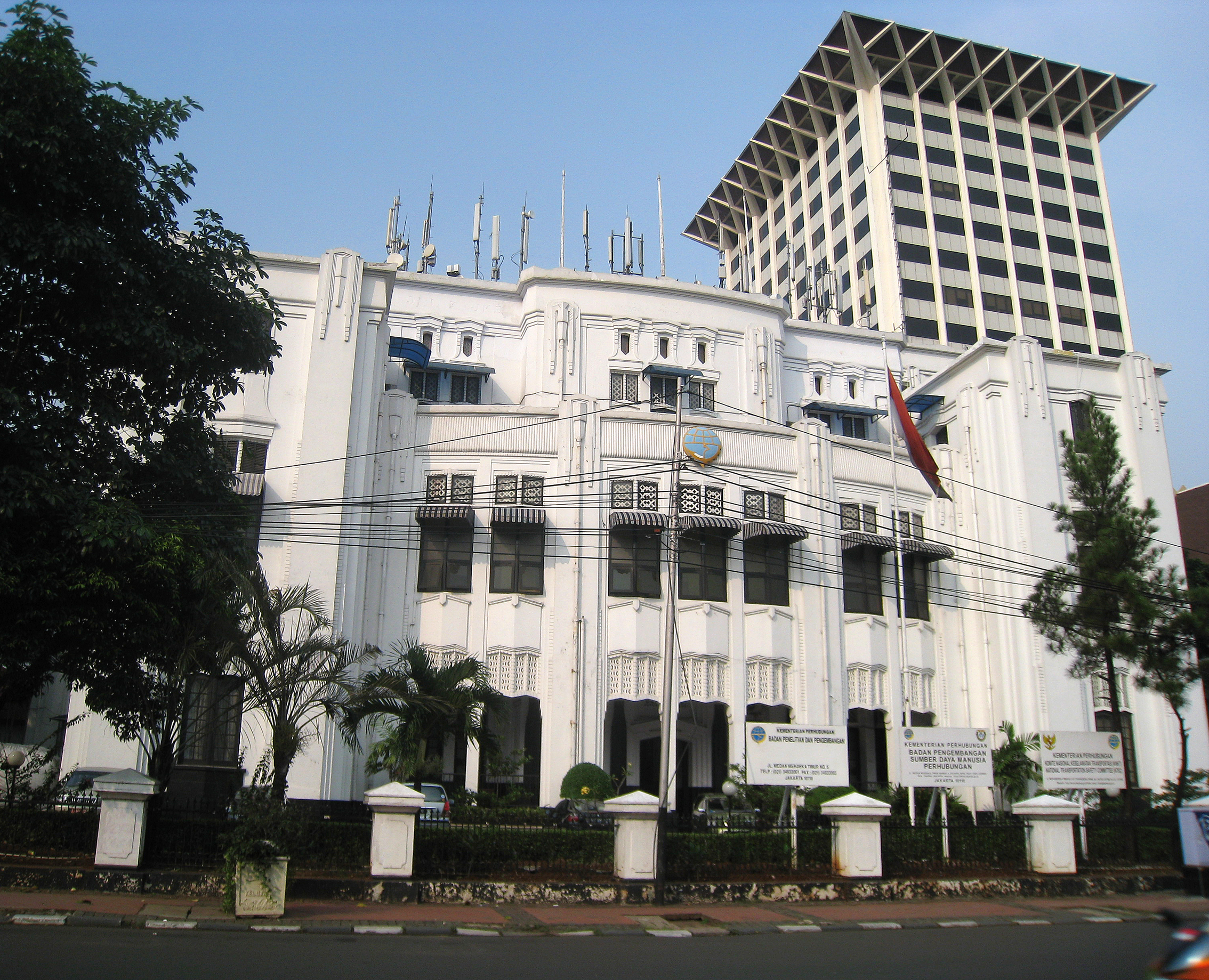
Ministry of Transportation Building, Jakarta (1917) by Ghijsels

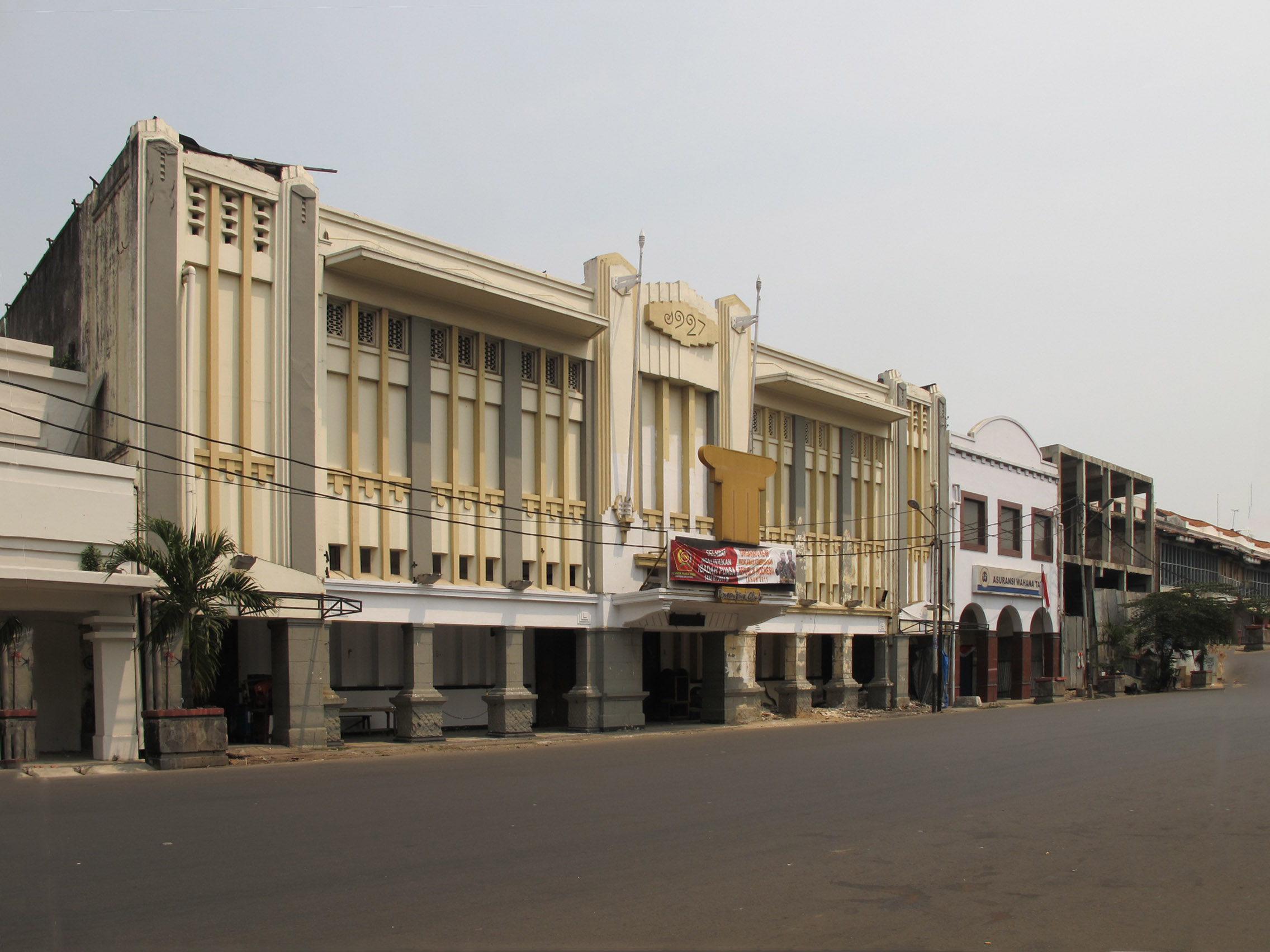
Athena Discothèque (1927) in Jakarta

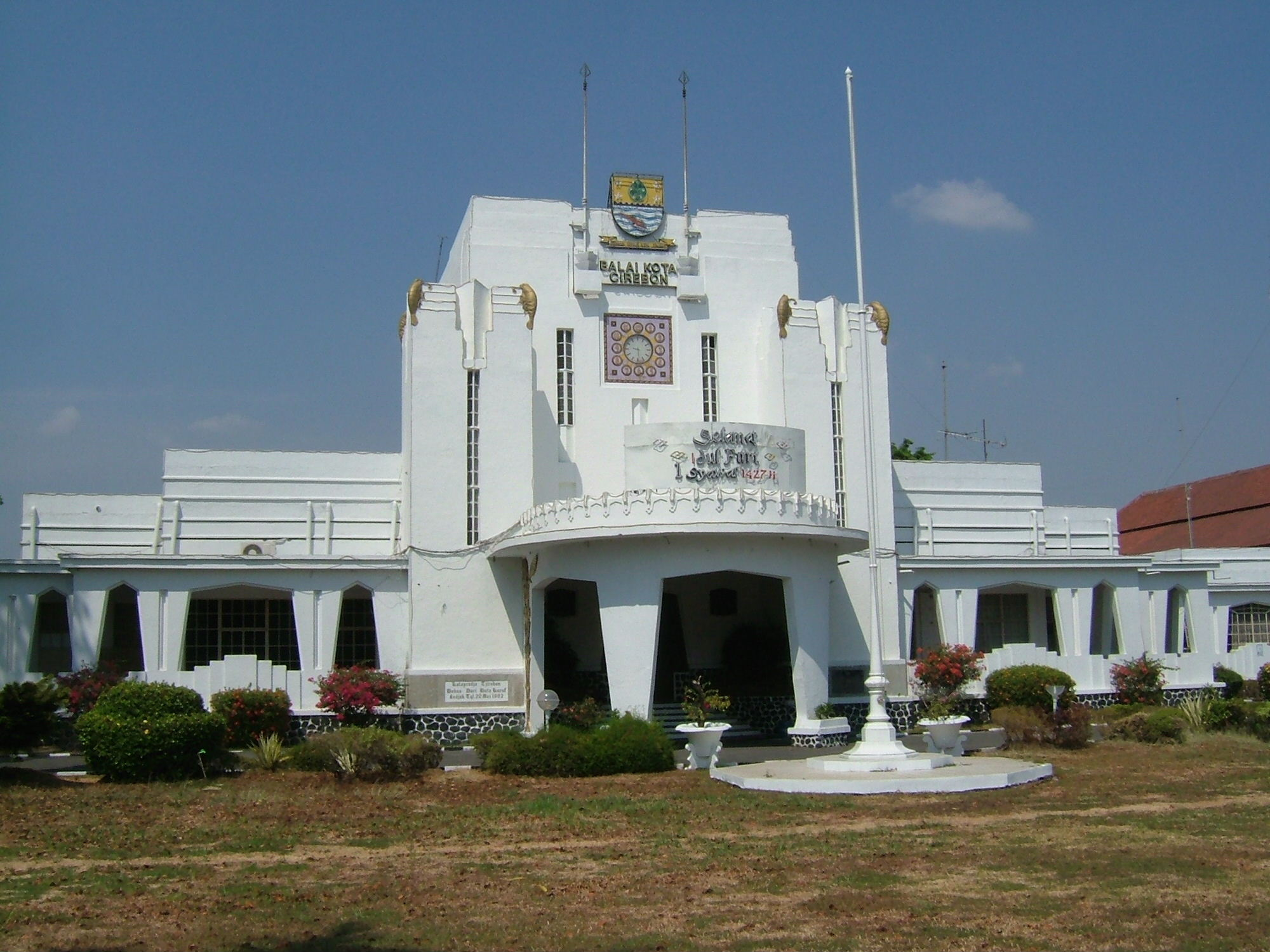
Cirebon City Hall (1926), an example for Amsterdam School style in the Indies

Later between 1920 and 1940, Art Deco evolved into a new style known in the Netherlands as Nieuwe Bouwen (Modernism) or Functionalism. The new architectural movement is largely influenced by German's Bauhaus and France's Le Corbusier. Instead of creating style on the facade, the architect creates style in the clear and logical arrangement of space. The preference is to use universal form such as cube or cylinder or curving horizontal lines and nautical motifs that are known as Streamline Moderne in the Anglophone world.

Industrialization and material standardization plays a role. Albert Aalbers is the most representative expression of Nieuwe Bouwen in Indonesia, apparent in his design for Hotel Savoy Homann (1939), DENIS Bank (1936), and De Driekleur (1937) in Bandung. In Indonesia, the style is characterized by its openness, the sleek facade lines, and strong spatial effect on the exterior and retreat of curtain wall. Many buildings employing this variation of Art Deco still exist in Bandung, one of the largest remaining collections of Streamline Moderne - Art Deco buildings in the world.

Other examples of Nieuwe Bouwen in Indonesia are the works of Cosman Citroen, K.H.G. Bos, W. Lemei, Liem Bwan Tjie and some buildings of AIA Bureau of Schoemaker, namely Bandung Jaarbeurs, which he designed shortly after his study trip to America, clearly inspired by Frank Lloyd Wright. Also Villa Isola shows strong influence of Nieuwe Bouwen in its steel framing construction, steel windows, and reinforced concrete.

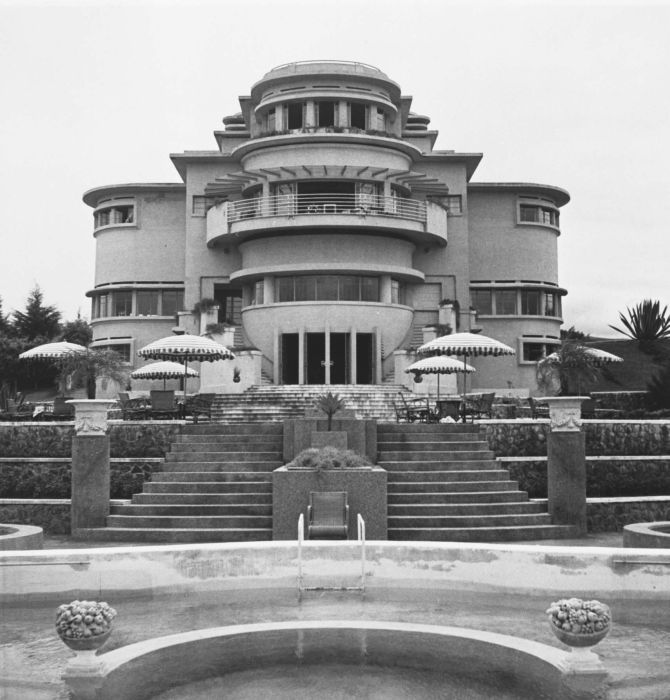
Villa Isola, Bandung

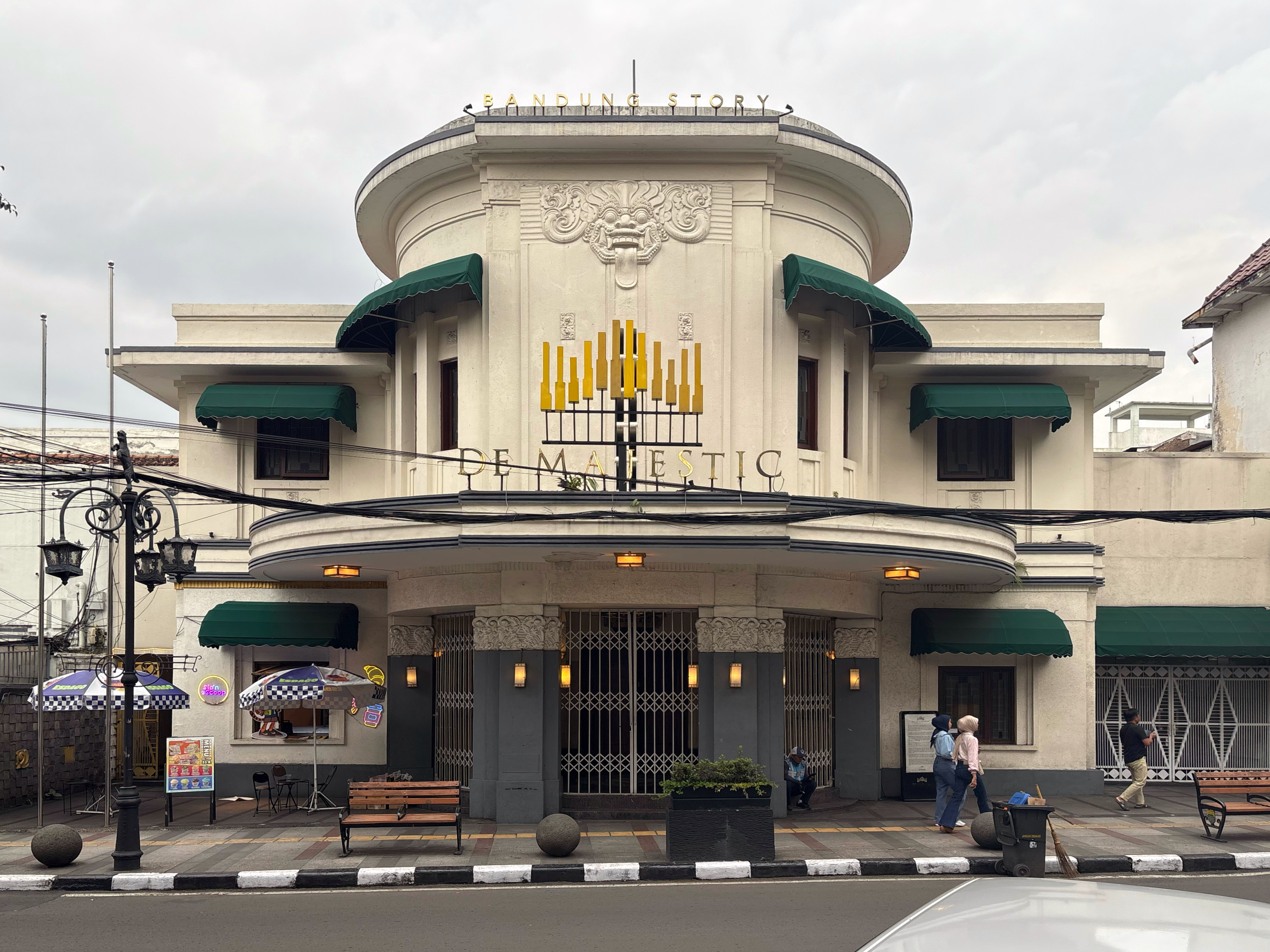
Concordia cinema decorated with the traditional kāla head motif on its facade

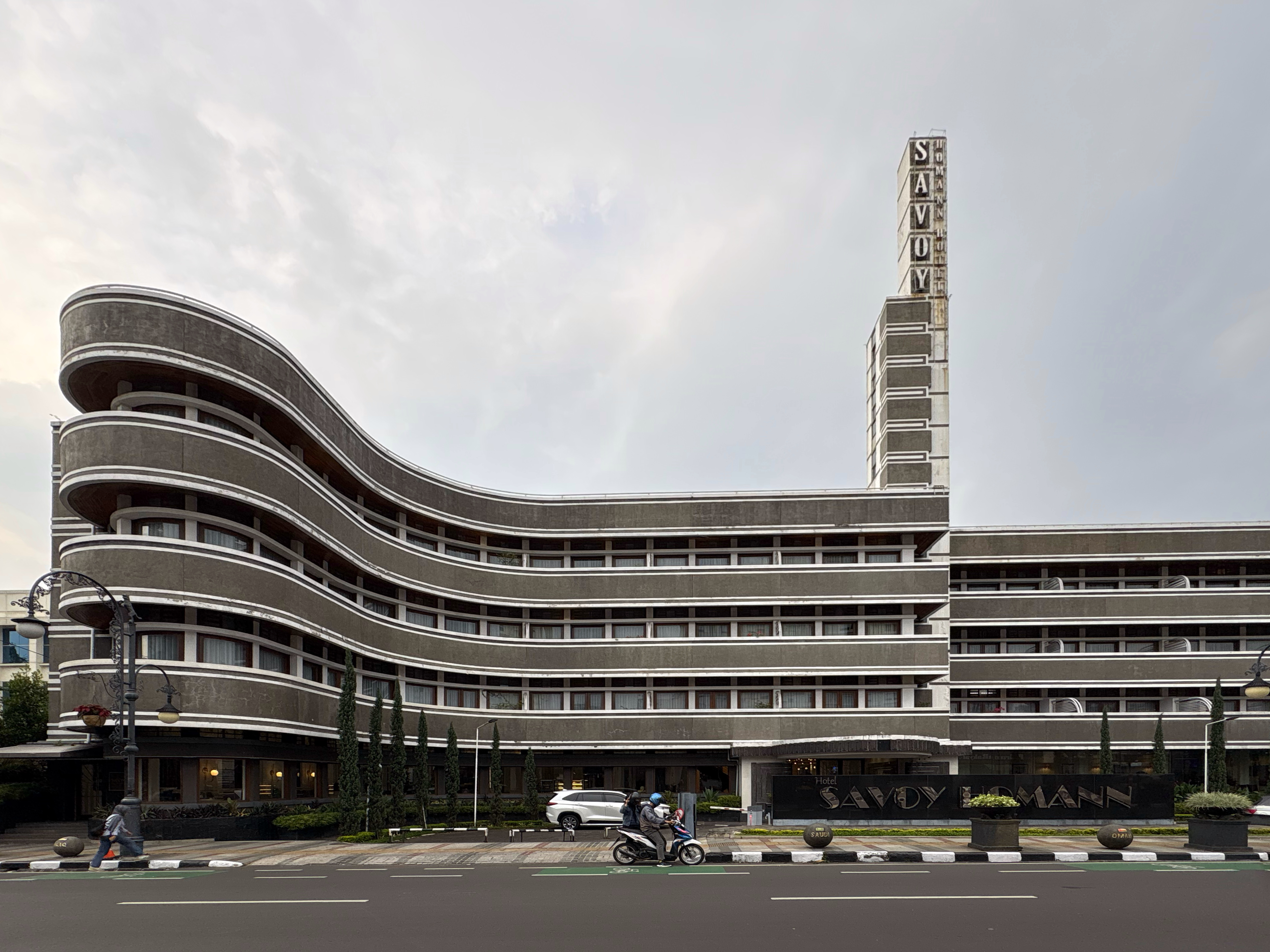
Hotel Savoy Homann employs Streamline Moderne element in its facade

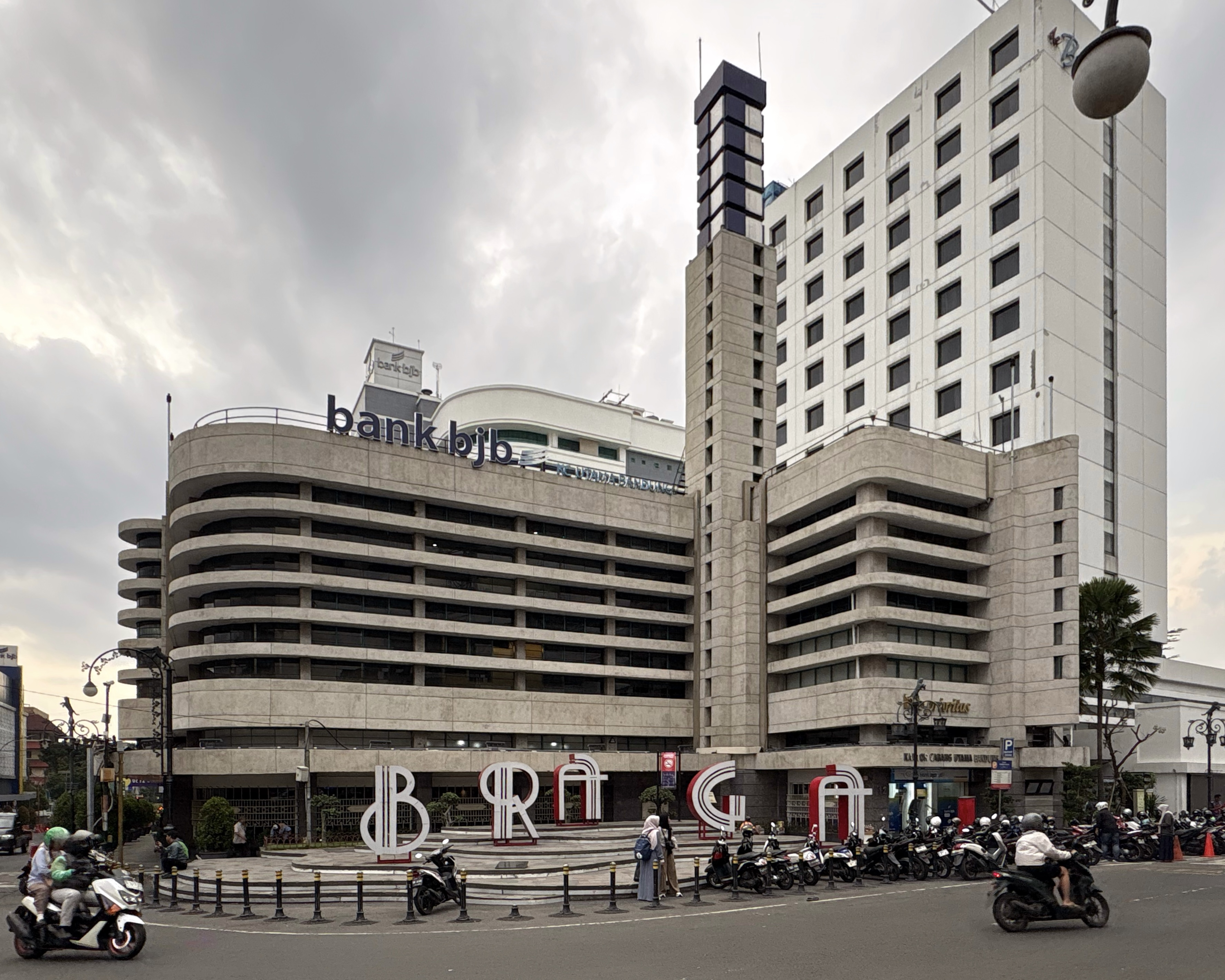
Bank BJB of Bandung shows expressive Nieuwe Bouwen form

By the end of 1920s, Nieuwe Zakelijkheid (English: New Objectivity) became popular in the Dutch East Indies. The form was even more austere and reduced than its predecessor, employing angular shapes and designs that are essentially free of decoration. The style shows early transition into International style. Earliest example of this is Mandiri Museum (1929), built under a well-planned spatial planning around the Waterlooplein station square of Kota Station, a sample of pre-World War II urban planning which for Southeast Asia was completely unprecedented and new. Other notable examples is Palembang Mayoral Office (Snuyf, 1928–1931, nicknamed Kantor Ledeng, English: Plumb Office) and Kota Post Office (Baumgartner, 1929).

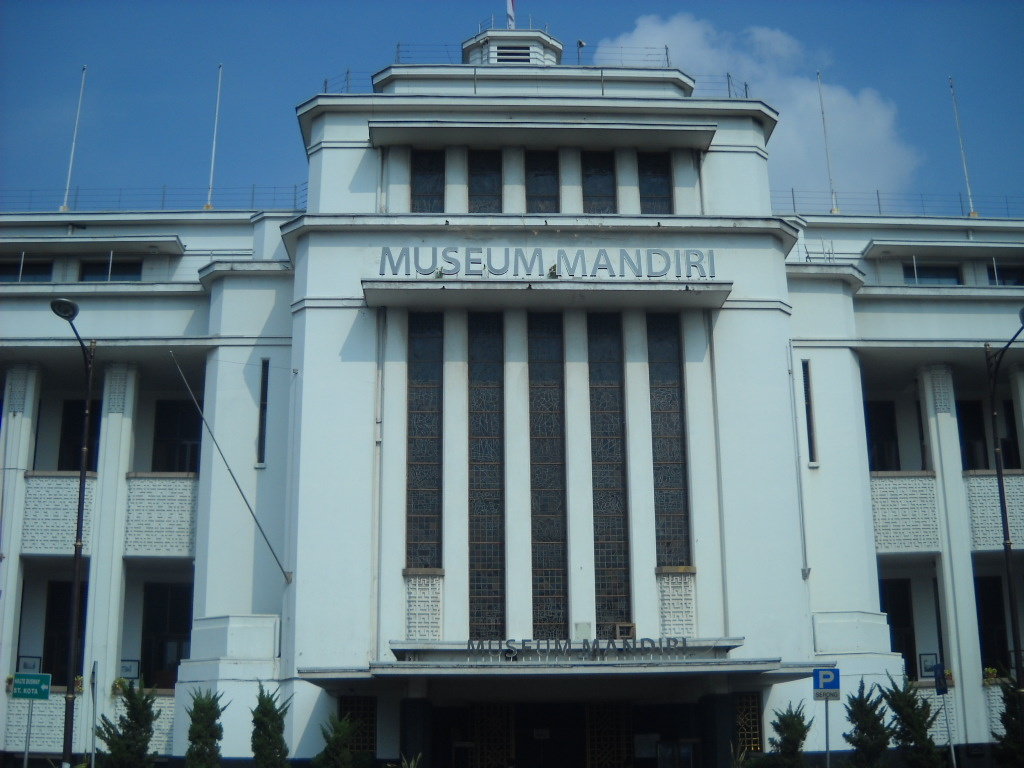
Bank Mandiri Museum is one of the earliest implementation of Nieuwe Zakelijkheid in the Dutch East Indies

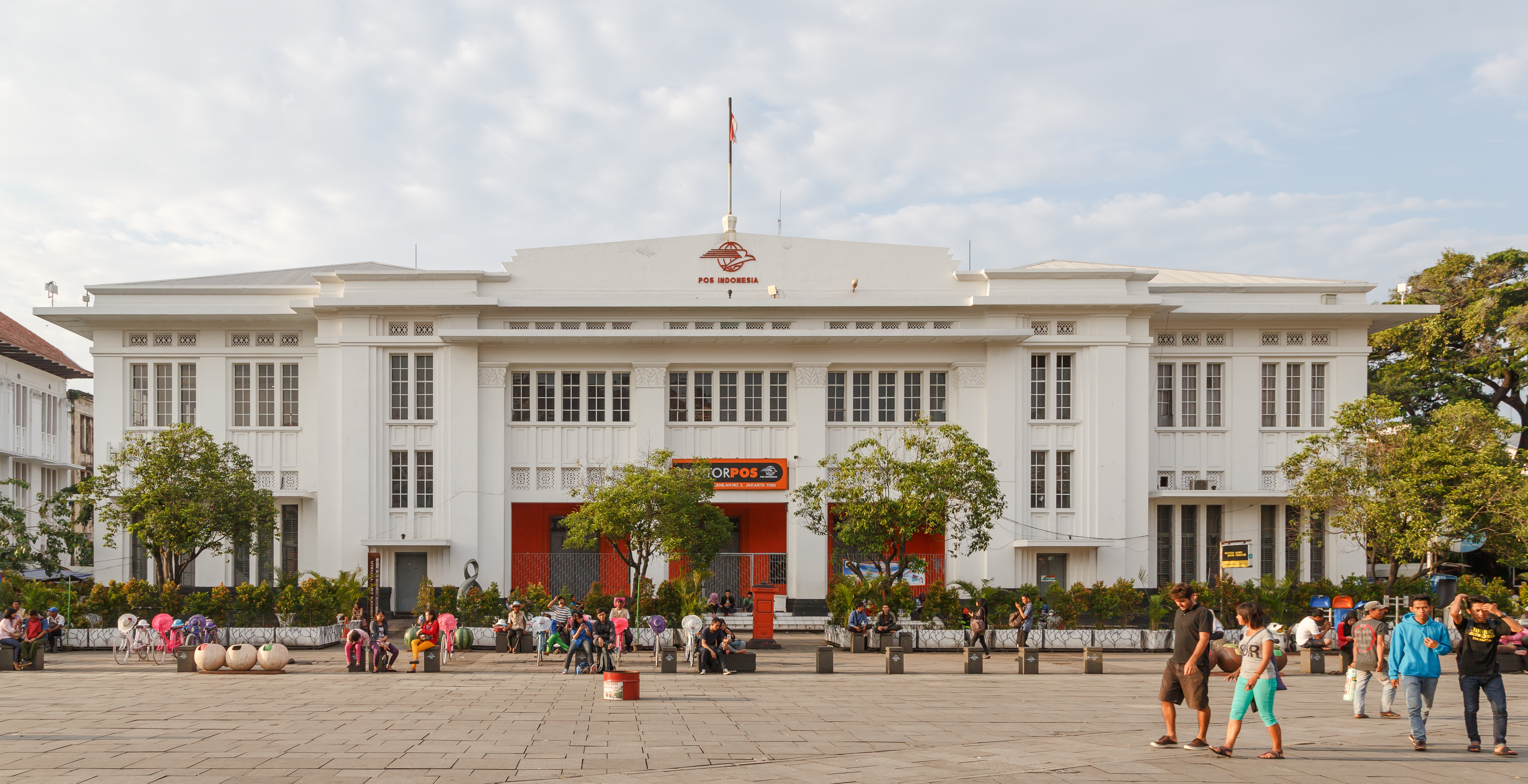
Kota Post Office Building

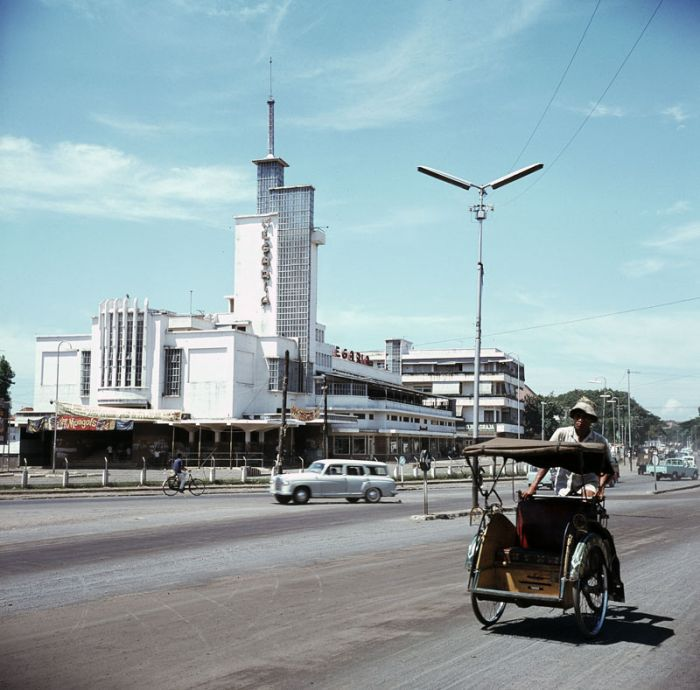
Jakarta Metropole (1939) employed features of Nieuwe Zakelijkheid

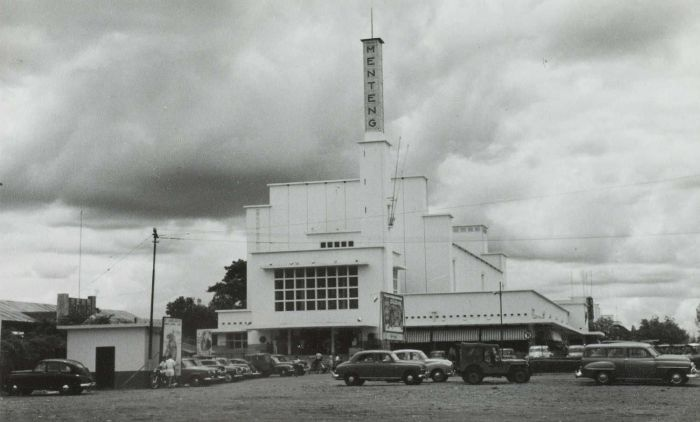
Groenewegen's Menteng Cinema (1940), now demolished and replaced by Menteng Huis

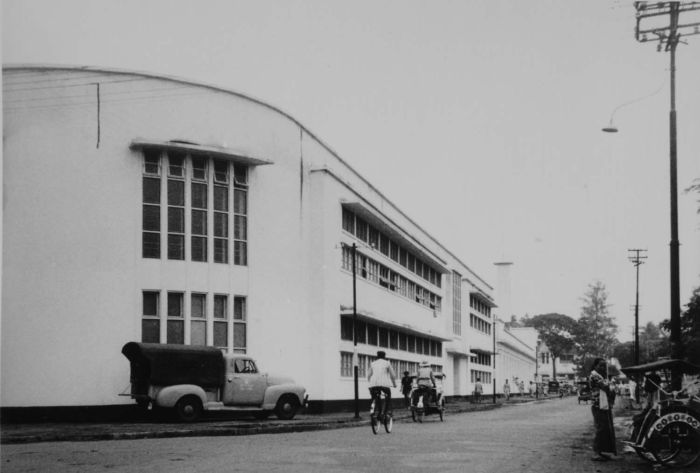
The Unie building in Batavia, now demolished

=== Neo vernacular form ===
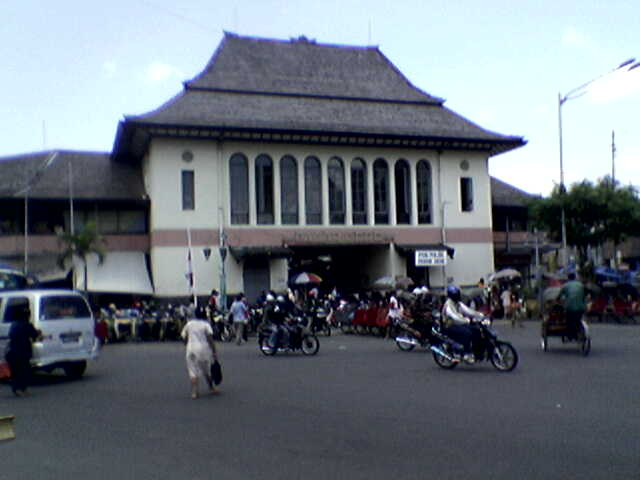
Karsten's early attempt in producing an overtly Javanese form in Pasar Gede Harjonagoro

In the Netherlands, the modernist and functionalist Nieuwe Bouwen presents a stark contrast with the traditionalist Delft School. The Delft School in the Netherlands is expressed as modern architecture with a humble, simple look inspired by the old houses of Dutch countryside. The Delft School does not appear in Indonesia, however it can be defined as a 20th-century architecture style which conforms toward the traditional tropical consideration; Indies architecture (Indische architectuur).

Despite the strong contrast between Nieuwe Bouwen and Indische architectuur, both styles shared the thrust of overcoming the Indies Empire style and symbolic remnants of the 19th century's colonial feudal lords.

This new school of thought and design with strongly implement traditional elements using 20th-century technologies and Modernist architectural principles from Europe appeared mainly in the 1920s and 1930s. Indigenous roofs were singled out for particular attention and there were many interesting syntheses of local and European forms and construction techniques. The interest of modernists in the dynamic interplay of geometrical elements was soon incorporated into the new style and led to bold experiments that combined these structural forms with traditional vernacular ornamentation. Thomas Karsten and Henri Maclaine Pont were among the architects active in developing this movement.

One example is the former offices of the Dutch steamtram company Samarang–Joana Stoomtram Maatschappij in Semarang by Thomas Karsten (1930). The ground plan of this single-storeyed building is identical to that of a traditional Javanese Joglo: tall columns support a hipped, two-tiered roof, which facilitates cross ventilation of the roof cavity.

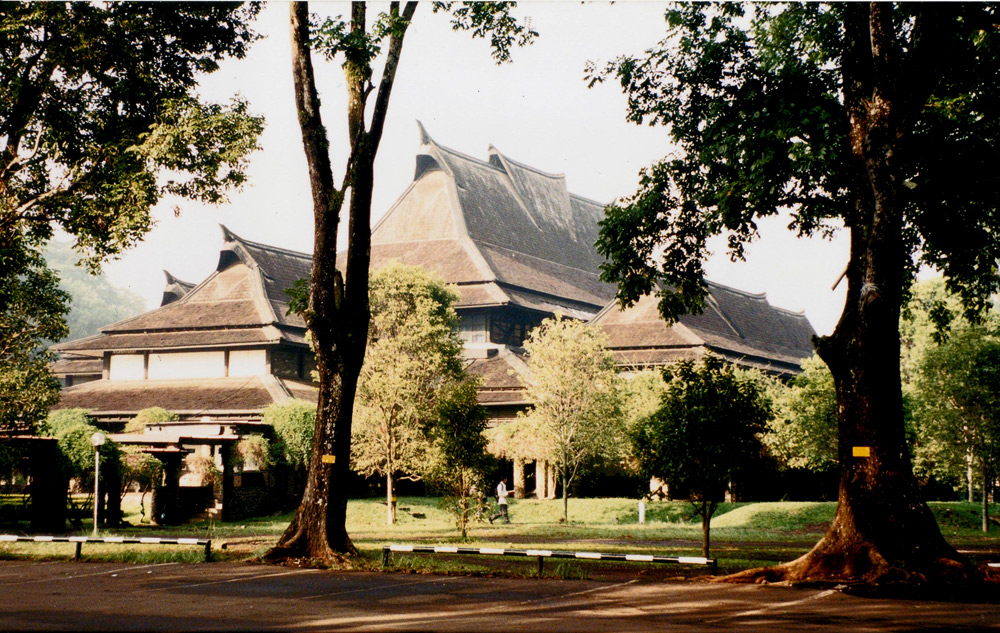
The ceremonial hall of the Bandung Institute of Technology shows a mix of Batak architecture

Notable examples of this movement appear in Maclaine Pont's design for the ceremonial halls of the Technische Hoogeschool te Bandoeng (which became the Bandung Institute of Technology). The building features an eclectic synthesis of various Indonesian local forms, including the architecture of Lake Toba, the Mentawai Islands, and Sunda. The building is a striking example of innovative tropical architecture. With an elongated elevation aligned on an east-west axis, the building is provided with effective natural ventilation. This orientation also minimizes the effect of solar radiation in that the morning and afternoon sun only strikes the narrow end facades of the building. The external galleries of the building create a double facade which shield the interior from direct sunlight, while cooling towers at either end ensure good ventilation.

Other example is the guesthouse of the Bataafse Petroleum Maatschappij in Berastagi (1939) by Herman van den Heuvel of the Langereis & Co. architecture firm.

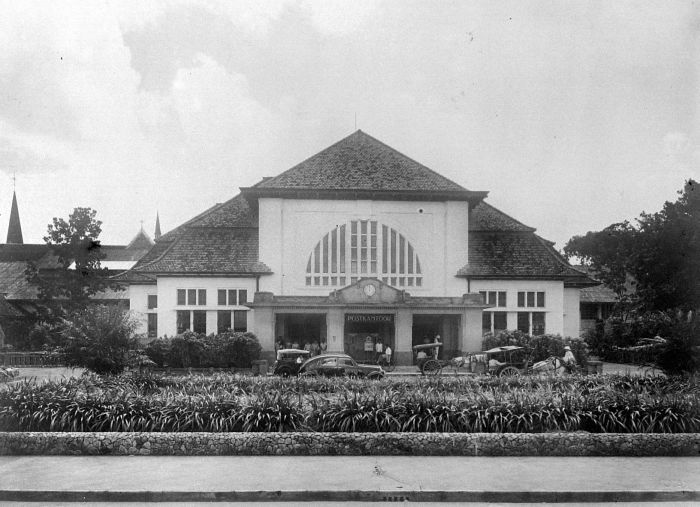
Central Post Office of Surabaya (1926) by G.J.P.M. Bolsius

== Native architects during the colonial period ==
During the colonial period, there were already native Indonesian architects. Graduated from the Technische Hoogeschool in Bandung, these Indonesian natives were either employed by Dutch architects, or established their own design practice. Among these were Anwari and Sukarno (who later became the first president of the Republic of Indonesia) and who studied architecture at Bandung's Technische Hoogeschool in 1920. Civil engineer Roosseno, who collaborated briefly with Sukarno in 1931, carried out his own construction company from 1932.

One of the first design coming from an Indonesian native architect was the house of Dr. Han Tiauw Tjong in Semarang (1932), designed by architect Liem Bwan Tjie. Liem Bwan Tjie came from a Peranakan Chinese family in Semarang. In addition to designing private houses, agency houses and offices, Liem Bwan Tjie also created designs for public facilities e.g. cinemas, swimming pool, hospitals and grave monuments. One of his largest assignment is the hospital complex at Karang Panjang, Ambon City (1963–1964).

Other Indonesian architects active during the period were Sudarsono, Soehamir and Friedrich Silaban. Silaban worked as Head of the Genie in Pontianak, West Kalimantan from 1937, was appointed as Director of the Municipal Works of Bogor in 1942 at the beginning of World War II. He fulfilled this position until 1965, interrupted in 1951 for one year architectural study at the Academy of Architecture in Amsterdam. He would become one of Indonesia's most renowned architects when his design for the largest mosque in Southeast Asia was chosen.

== Post-colonial period ==
After 1949, few European or European-trained architects and urban planners remained in the newly independent Republic of Indonesia. A few remaining architects, such as Blankenberg, Kreisler, Liem and Lüning, designed new town and buildings with their Indonesian colleagues. At the height of the West Irian issue, all Dutch people who had not opted for Indonesian citizenship were repatriated in 1957. Some Dutch architectural firms were closed or nationalized as a result of this policy. One of the few remaining architects who chose Indonesian citizenship was Han Groenewegen, who assisted Silaban in the design of Bank Indonesia on Thamrin Road, Jakarta.

== See also ==
- Colonial architecture of Indonesia
- Colonial architecture in Jakarta, Post Cultuurstelsel abolition – 1870 to mid 20th century
- Dutch colonial architecture
- Indies Empire style
- Bahay kubo
- Bahay na bato
- Earthquake Baroque
- Landhuis
- Malay house
- Rumah adat
- Sino-Portuguese architecture

== Cited works ==
- Abidin Kusno (2010). The Appearances of Memory: Mnemonic Practices of Architecture and Urban Form in Indonesia. London: Duke University Press. pp. 141–142. ISBN 9780822392576.
- Akihary, Huib (1990). ARCHITECTUUR & STEDEBOUW IN INDONESIË 1870/1970. Zutphen: De Walburg Pers. ISBN 9060116976.
- Budi A Sukada (1998). Gunawan Tjahjono (ed.). The Emergence of a New Indies Style. Indonesian Heritage - Architecture. Vol. 6. Singapore: Archipelago Press. ISBN 981-3018-30-5.
- Het Indische bouwen: architectuur en stedebouw in Indonesie : Dutch and Indisch architecture 1800-1950. Helmond: Gemeentemuseum Helmond. 1990.
- Yulianto Somalyo (1998). Gunawan Tjahjono (ed.). Attempted Synthesis: Dutch Architects in the Indies. Indonesian Heritage - Architecture. Vol. 6. Singapore: Archipelago Press. ISBN 981-3018-30-5.
