= Gedung Sate =

Public building in West Java, Indonesia

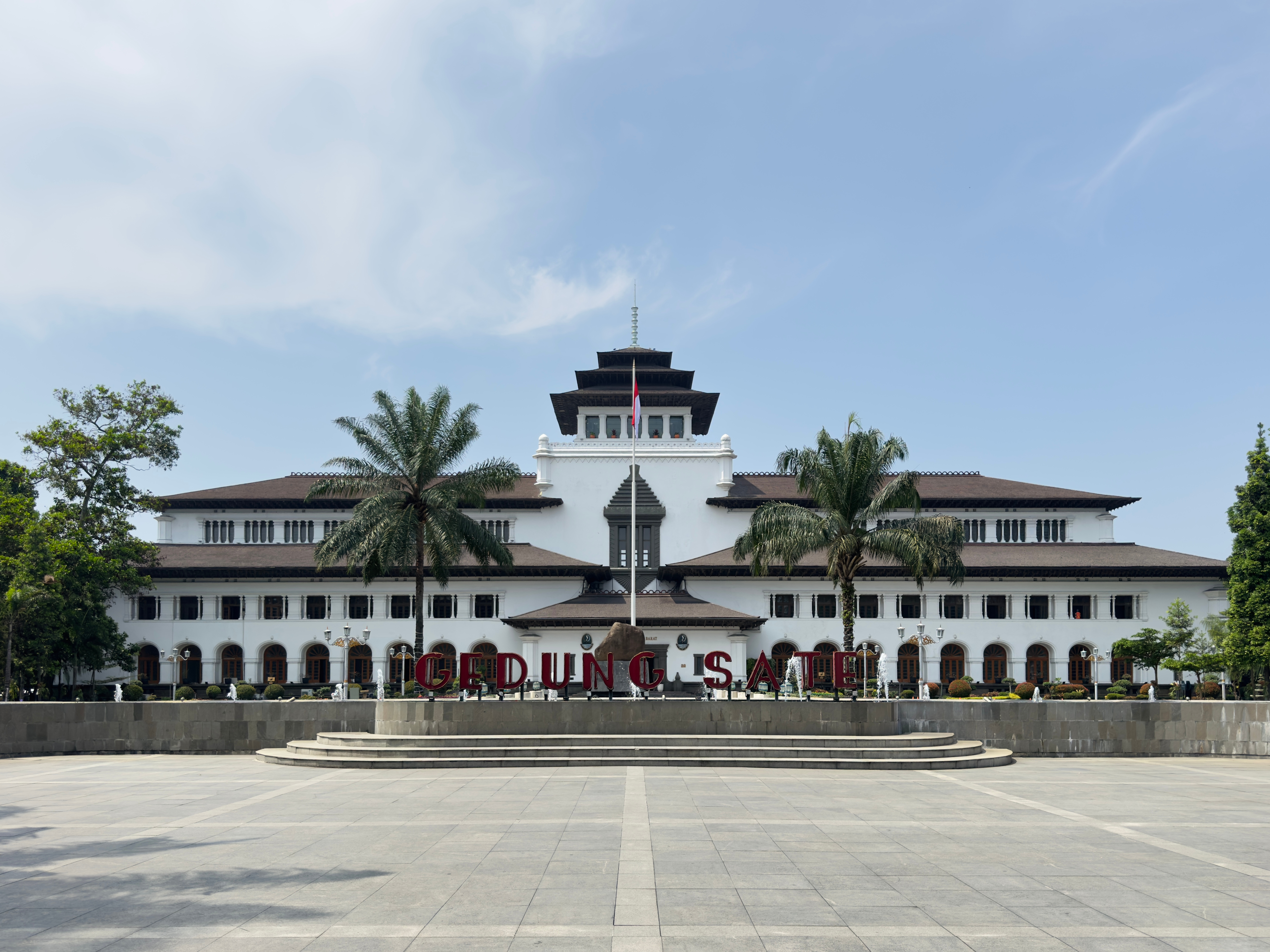
- A view of Gedung Sate
- Former names: Departement van Gouvernements Bedrijven (GB) building

General information
- Architectural style: New Indies style, Dutch Rationalism, Sundanese style, Neoclassical
- Location: Bandung, Indonesia, Jalan Diponegoro No. 22
- Coordinates: 6.902459°S 107.618730°E
- Construction started: 27 July 1920
- Completed: September 1924
- Owner: Government of West Java

Technical details
- Floor count: 3
- Floor area: 27,990.859 m^{2}

Design and construction
- Architect: J.Gerber
- Other designers: Eh. De Roo, G. Hendriks

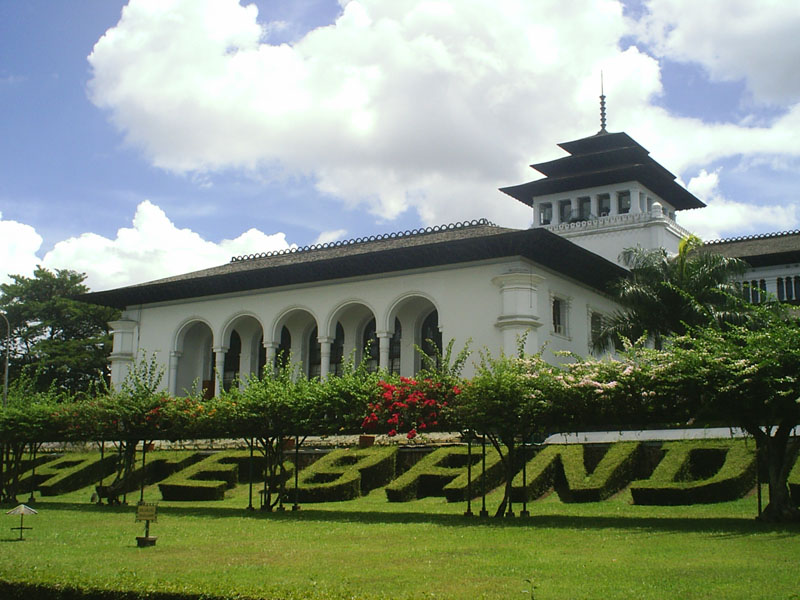
Southern side

Gedung Sate is a public building in Bandung, West Java, Indonesia. It was designed according to a neoclassical design incorporating native Indonesian elements (such as Hindu-Buddhist elements) by Dutch architect J. Gerber to be the seat of the Dutch East Indies department of State Owned Enterprises (Departement van Gouvernmentsbedrijven, literally "Department of Government Industries"); the building was completed in 1924. Today, the building serves as the seat of the governor of West Java, and also a museum.

Its common name, Gedung sate, is a nickname that translates literally from Indonesian to 'satay building', which is a reference to the shape of the building's central pinnacle - which resemble the shape of one of the Indonesian traditional dish called satay. The central pinnacle consists of six spheres that represent the six million guilders funded to the construction of the building.

== See also ==
- Indonesian architecture
- List of colonial buildings in Bandung
- New Indies style
