= Gedong Tinggi Palmerah =

18th-century house in Jakarta, Indonesia

Coordinates: 6.207205°S 106.789511°E

Gedong Tinggi Palmerah ("Palmerah Tall Building") is an 18th-century Dutch Indies country house located in Jakarta, Indonesia. The building is among the protected colonial heritage of Indonesia. Like many other colonial country houses of Jakarta, despite its protection by the government, the lack of interest in the study of the building caused it to slowly fall into disrepair. It was converted into a police station.

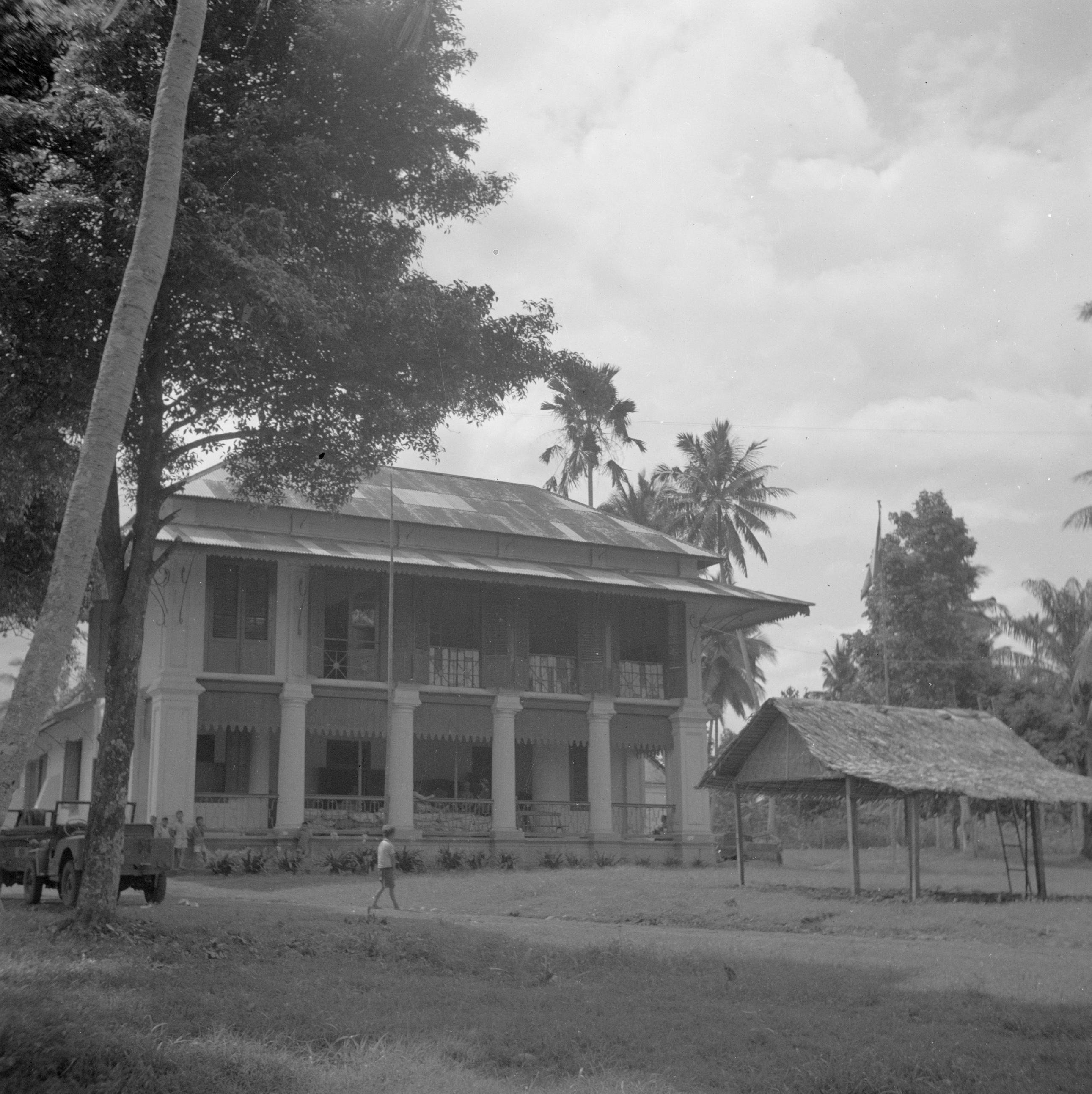
Gedong Tinggi Palmerah in February 1946

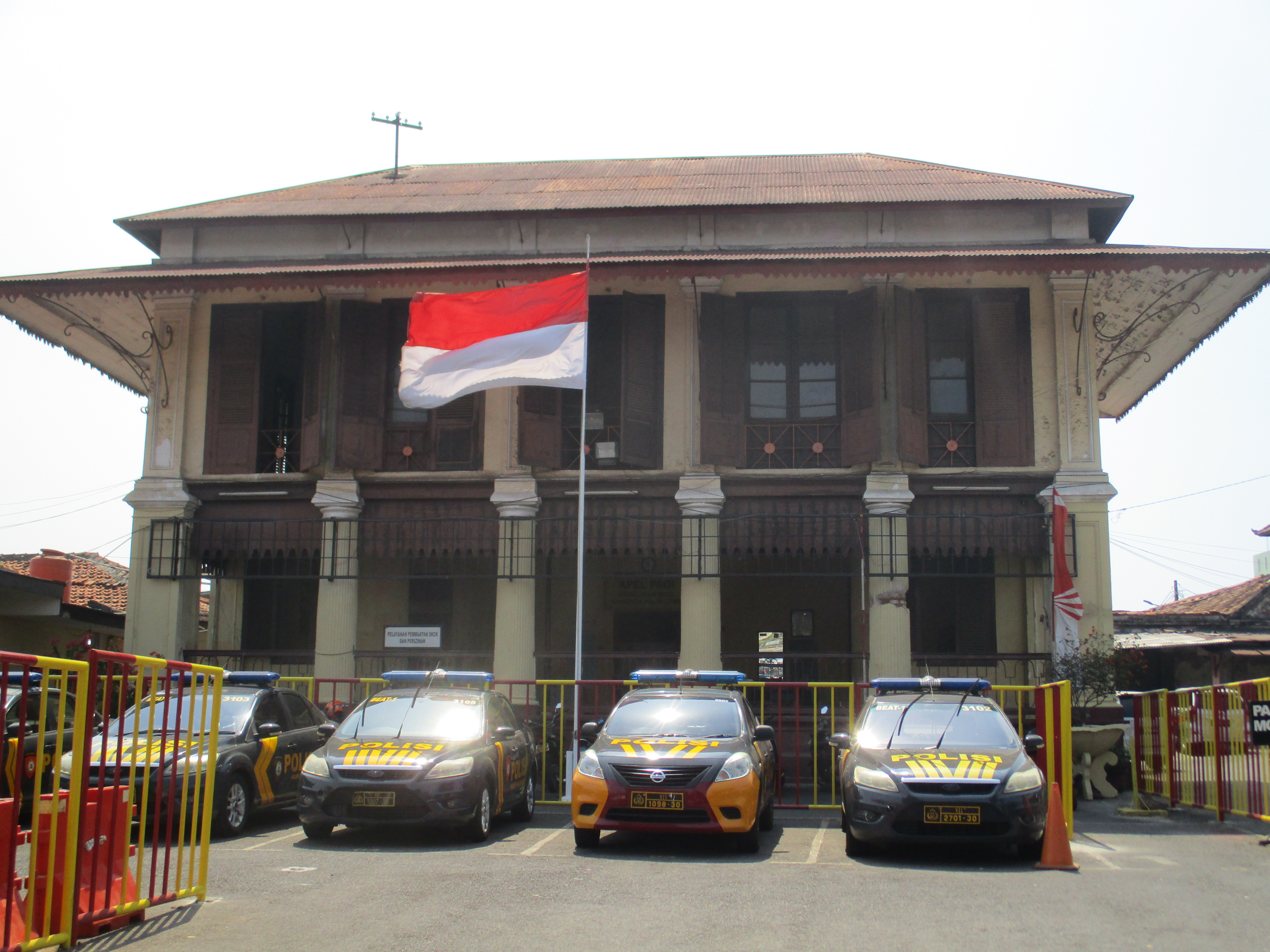
Gedong Tinggi Palmerah in 2019, currently used as a police station

== Design ==
The building is located at Palmerah Barat Street, Palmerah. When the building was completed in 1790, the neighborhood of Palmerah was still a forested area on the edge of Batavia. At the front of the house is a vast garden. The garden and the area surrounding the country house became settlements, mainly farmers and fishermen.

Gedong Tinggi Palmerah is a 2-story stone building. The building is constructed in the Transitional Dutch Indies country houses (or Nederlands-Indische stijl) style, an area of Dutch architecture founded in the 18th-century. The Dutch Indies was a transition from the Dutch style that did not acknowledge local weather conditions. This was a step towards a complete assimilation of Javanese architecture where house design recognized the tropical climate. The second floor of the building is constructed in an enclosed European style, while the ground floor is open. The eaves of the roof do not jut out generously to protect the interior from the elements. Corrugated roofs were added just under the roof.

== History ==
Gedong Tinggi Palmerah was constructed in 1790 by Andries Hartsinck, a high-ranking VOC official. In that period people began to abandon the Old Town of Batavia due to its increasingly unhealthy environment. The 18th-century saw many wealthy residents of Batavia build country houses outside the city wall in the hope that they could live free from the malaria disease plaguing the Old Town.

The establishment of the Gedong Tinggi Palmerah was the beginning of the occupation of the area of Palmerah. After Gedong Tinggi Palmerah, Palmerah station was established at the end of the 19th-century to the east of Gedong Tinggi Palmerah. Jalan Palmerah Barat is the main road that connects the country house and the station. Close to Pasar Palmerah, Hartsinck built another country house known as Djipang that was destroyed in 1996.

This building is part of the cultural heritage of Jakarta and is protected under the STRL Monument Law 1931 no. 238 and under the supervision of the regional government of Jakarta.

== Legacy ==
Despite the protection, the building is threatened by lack of maintenance, typical of the fate of Dutch Indies country houses in Jakarta. Examples of destroyed country houses of Jakarta include Landhuis Pondok Gede (destroyed in the 1990s to build a mall), Landhuis Cengkareng (destroyed in 1980 for property business purposes), Landhuis Djipang (demolished in 1996), Landhuis Tanjung Timur (burned in 1985 after it was converted into a police dormitory, now only the ruins left). The country house Landhuis Cililitan in Jakarta is still standing; however, its conversion into a police dormitory means that the lack of maintenance by its tenants, as well as the lack of awareness of its cultural value, has threatened its survival.

Gedong Tinggi Palmerah is located on the premise of the Palmerah Subdistrict's police station and is partly used as police dormitory.

== Cited works ==
- Heuken, A. (2015). Tempat-tempat Bersejarah di jakarta. Jakarta: Cipta Loka Caraka. ISBN 978-602-70395-7-5.
- Thamrin, Mahandis Yoanata (August 14, 2013). "Hikayat Rumah Pedesaan Petinggi VOC di Palmerah". National Geographic Indonesia. National Geographic Indonesia. Archived from the original on November 30, 2016.

== See also ==
- Dutch Indies country house
- Rumah Cililitan Besar
- Groeneveld (estate)
- Tanjung West
- List of colonial buildings and structures in Jakarta
