= Tanjung Timur =

Coordinates: 6°18′10″S 106°51′23″E

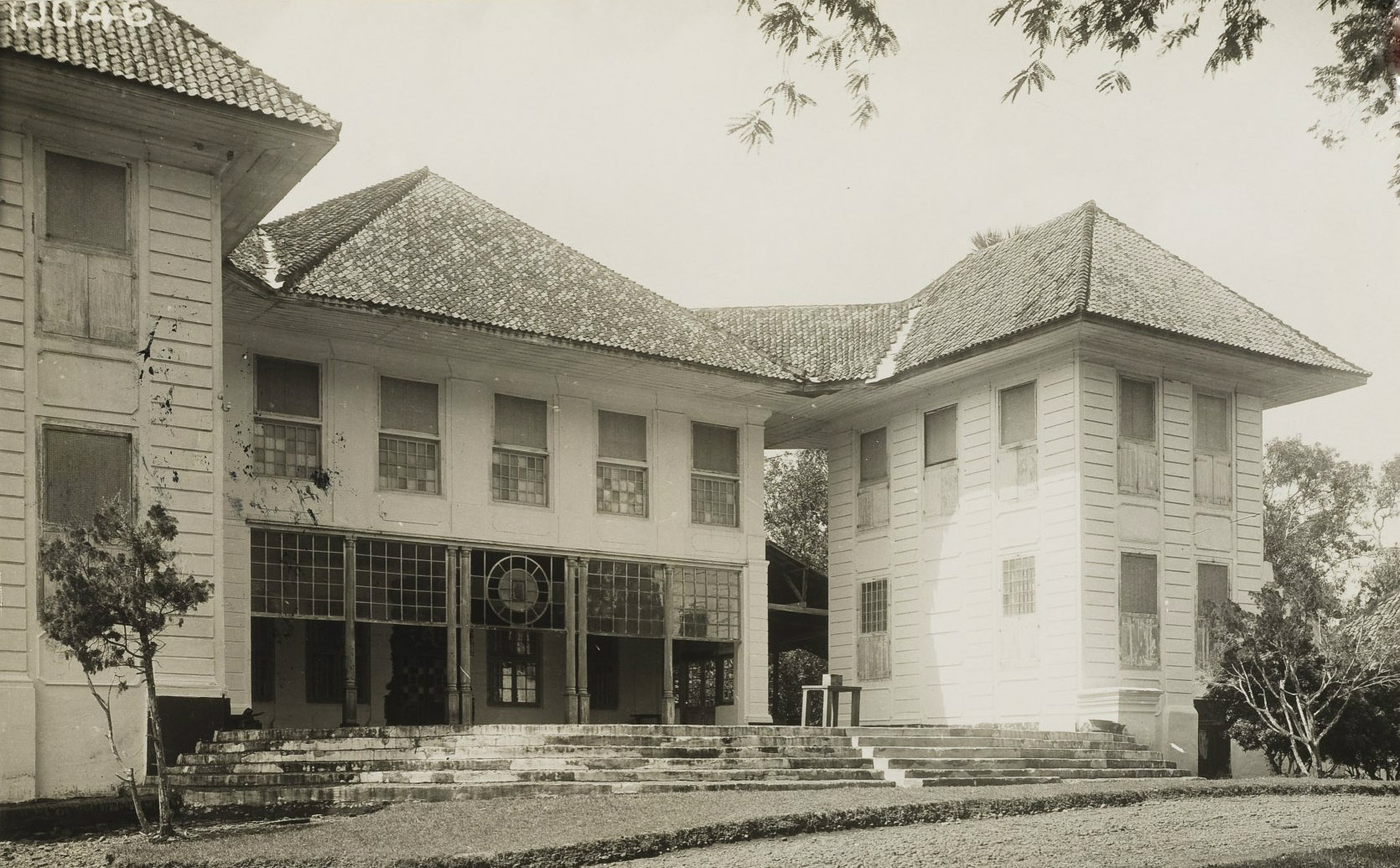
18th-century Landhuis Tandjong Oost around 1930s in Batavia (now Jakarta). Despite its protected status, lack of interest and maintenance from the government means that the house has fallen into a ruinous state.

Tandjong Oost (English "East Cape"; Indonesian "Tanjung Timur"), also known as Groeneveld (English "green field"), was a particuliere land, or private domain, in modern-day Pasar Rebo, East Jakarta, Indonesia. It was one of two estates located on the banks of the Ciliwung river: Tandjong Oost to the east of the river, and Tandjong West to the west.

The former domain contains an 18th-century Dutch colonial manor house, similarly called Landhuis Tandjong Oost. The house was burned down in 1985, and its remains have been left to deteriorate despite their heritage status.

== Origin ==
The first owner of the estate is Pieter van de Velde from Amersfoort, a member of the Council of the Indies. After the Chinese Massacre of 1740, van de Velde managed to acquire a large landed estate, formerly owned by Nie Hoe Kong, the deposed 'Kapitein der Chinezen' or Chinese head of Batavia. Van de Velde enlarged the Kapitein's landholdings by acquiring more land south of Meester Cornelis (now Jatinegara) on the eastern bank of the Ciliwung, thus forming the new private domain of Tandjong Oost. He built a 'landhuis' or manor house in 1756 on his new estate. Peter van de Velde died in 1759. The second landowner was Adrian Jubbels, who acquired the estate in 1763. After the death of Jubbels, the land was acquired by Jacobus Johannes Craan in 1763. He renamed the estate Groeneveld (Dutch "green field") and renovated the landhuis with new ornaments in the Louis XV style, and added some Chinese-inspired ornaments on the doors and windows. The ornaments were visible until the entire residence burnt down in 1985.

== The mansion ==
The two-storey manor house was built in a style known as the Old Indies Style. It shows combination of Dutch, Chinese, and local architecture. The 18th-century Indies architecture is similar to the building of National Archives of Indonesia. The building complex consisted of three pavilions. The doors of the rooms were decorated with carvings of teak with plant motifs; above the main entrance, the ornament was adorned with a crane, symbol of the Craan family. There was a private family cemetery in the grounds of Groeneveld.

== The Craan and van Riemsdijk families ==
After Craan died in 1780, the Groeneveld estate was inherited by his daughter Catharina Margaretha Craan and son-in-law, Willem Vincent Helvetius van Riemsdijk, second son of Governor-General Jeremias van Riemsdijk. Willem Helvetius van Riemsdijk had already acquired both high position and wealth notwithstanding his relative youth; at 17 he was the administrator of Onrust Island; and he owned many private domains and sugarcane plantations, among which are Tanah Abang, Cibinong, Cimanggis, Ciampea, Cibungbulan, Sadeng, and now Tandjong Oost. The latter property, with its lavish landhuis, remained in the van Riemsdijk family until the start of World War II.

The land was improved by Daniel Cornelius Helvetius van Riemsdijk, who farmed in Tandjong Oost until his death in 1860, when the estate passed down to his daughter, Dina Cornelia. Dina Cornelia was married Tjalling Ament of Dokkum. Ament continued farming in Groeneveld. By the middle of the nineteenth century, there were 6,000 cattle heads in Tandjong Oost. Until 1942 the van Riemsdijk family maintained the estate, developing a local settlement for their workers on the estate, known as Kampong Gedong, so-called after the manor house (Gedong), being the only permanent building in that area. The workers became the ancestors of the local Betawi of the Condet are, who developed their own distinctive form of Betawi culture.

== World War II, Revolution and Independence ==
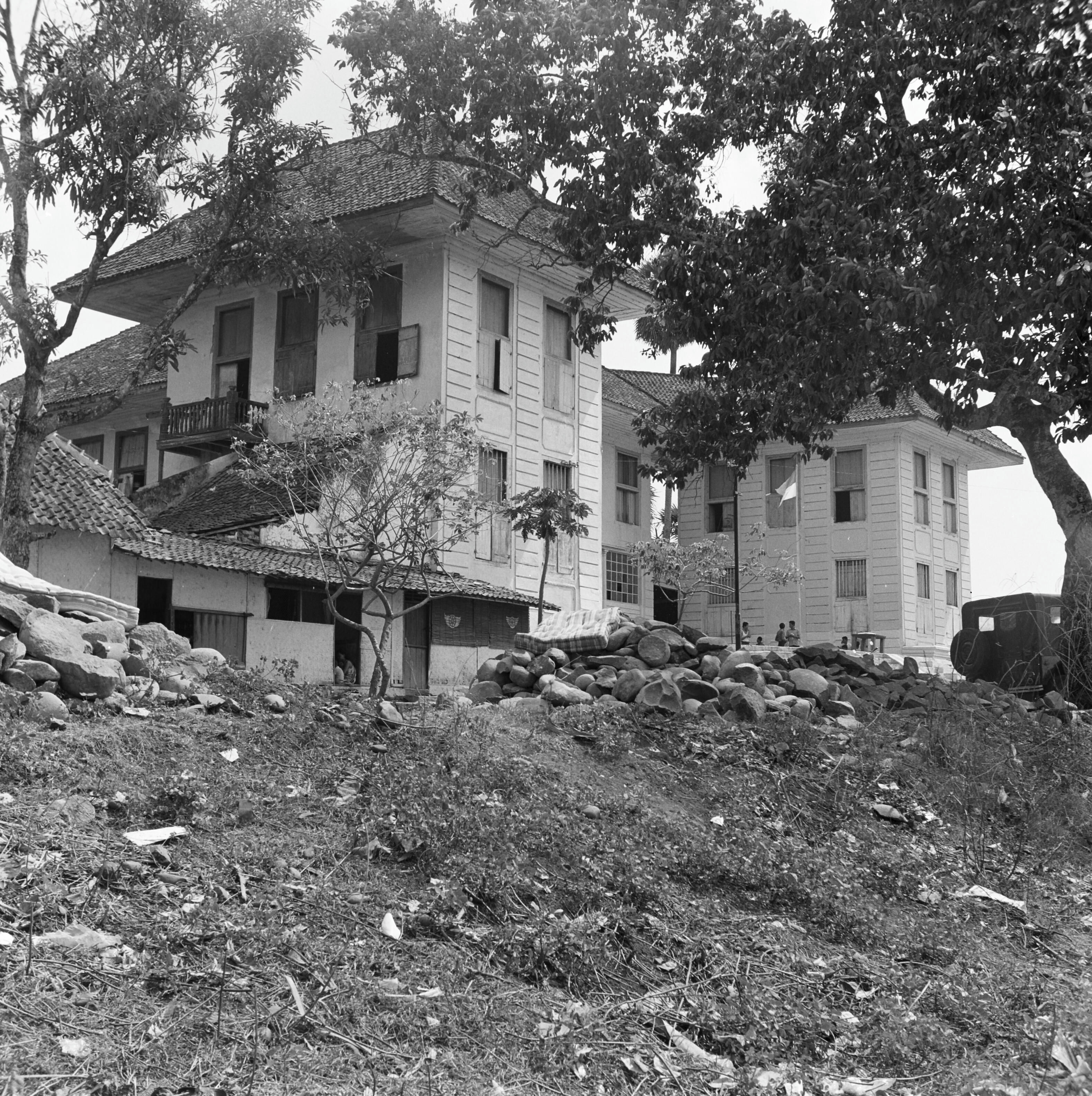
Tanjung Timur in 1972 showed signs of deterioration after it was acquired by the Jakarta Police.

During World War II, the landhuis was used by the Japanese occupation forces as a warehouse. After World War II, the building gained historical significance for the Indonesian Revolution when it became the headquarters of Barisan Pelopor, an underground movement against renewed efforts by the Dutch to repossess Indonesia. After the first Dutch aggression in 1947 and the second aggression in 1948, the estate was taken over by the Netherlands Indies Civil Administration, which turned it into a rubber plantation.

Once the Revolution had successfully established Indonesian Independence, the landhuis was acquired by Haji Sarmili, who converted it into a hotel, then an office building. in 1962, Sarmili sold the property to the Jakarta Police. In May 1985, the landhuis caught fire as a result of an explosion in the kitchen. The building was largely destroyed. The status of the site that of a protected heritage building, but the surviving structure remains seriously neglected. It is now within the precinct of officers houses of the Tanjung Timur Police.

== See also ==
- Indies Style
- List of colonial buildings and structures in Jakarta
