= Willem Frederik van Bylandt =

Dutch lieutenant-general

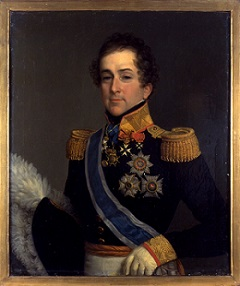
- Lieutenant-general W.F. count of Bylandt
- Born: 5 June 1771; The Hague
- Died: 25 October 1855 (aged 84); Prinsenhage
- Military career
- Allegiance: Dutch Republic; United Kingdom of the Netherlands
- Branch: Infantry
- Service years: 1783–1802; 1814–1830
- Rank: Lieutenant-general
- Units: 1st Brigade, 2nd Netherlands Division
- Commands: Hompesch Hussars; 1st brigade, 2nd Netherlands division
- Conflicts: Irish Rebellion of 1798; Battle of Ballinamuck; Hundred Days; Battle of Quatre Bras; Battle of Waterloo
- Awards: Knight's Cross 3rd class Military William Order

Willem Frederik count of Bylandt or Bijlandt (5 June 1771 – 25 October 1855) was a Dutch lieutenant-general who as a major-general commanded a Belgian-Dutch infantry brigade at the Battle of Quatre Bras and the Battle of Waterloo.

== Biography ==
=== Family life ===
Bylandt was born at The Hague, the son of major-general Alexander count of Bylandt and Anne, baroness Van der Duijn. His father was the acting-governor of the fortress of Breda who in 1793 was held responsible for the less-than-vigorous defense of that city against the French armies then invading the Dutch Republic. Alexander was court-martialed and sentenced to life imprisonment.

Bylandt first married Mary Christian (daughter of rear-admiral Sir Hugh Cloberry Christian) on 20 June 1806 at the Isle of Wight. After her death in 1818 he married Virginie Fréderique Wilhelmine Aspasia Craan (daughter of Willem Benjamin Craan) on 22 December 1825 in St. Joost-ten-Node (Belgium).

=== Early career ===
Bylandt was the scion of a well-known Dutch military family, both army and navy officers (a cousin became a well-known admiral of the same epoch). He first entered the service of the Dutch Republic as a cadet at age 12 in a regiment of Dragoons in 1783. In 1786 he became an NCO in the elite Gardes te paard (Horse Guards Regiment), and shortly afterward shifted to the Foot Guards as a second lieutenant (as such he took part on the Orangist side in the suppression of the Revolt of the Patriots). Promoted to captain in 1790 he transferred to the Schwartz battalion in 1794. He participated in the 1792-1795 campaigns of the War of the First Coalition, fighting in the Battle of Fleurus (1794) among others.

After the fall of the Republic and the proclamation of the Batavian Republic in January 1795 Bylandt resigned his commission and joined the Hereditary Prince (the future William I of the Netherlands) in Bremen with other émigrés, and followed the Prince to England later in the year to join a group of Orangist Dutch military men, who offered their services to the British. On 25 November 1795 he obtained a captain's commission in the regiment Hompesch Hussars that was sent to fight in the West Indies. He transferred to a regiment of chasseurs in 1796 as a major and was promoted to lieutenant-colonel in 1797. He so distinguished himself in the assault on Trinidad that he was entrusted with the military government of Antigua. In 1800 he rejoined the Hompesch Hussars as a lieutenant-colonel to take part in the suppression of the Irish Rebellion of 1798. He participated in the Battle of Ballinamuck with distinction.

After the Peace of Amiens Bylandt was paid off by the British and returned to the Batavian Republic to manage his estates near Breda. Only after the Netherlands regained its independence in 1813 did he again enter military service, this time as a lieutenant-colonel of the new Battalion Landmilitie (Militia) No. 12 (which was renumbered No. 8 in 1814). He was promoted to colonel of the regiment in 1814. On 21 April 1815 he was put in charge of the First Brigade, Second Netherlands Division (Perponcher) as a major-general.

=== Battles of Quatre Bras and Waterloo ===
On the evening of 15 June 1815 Bylandt's brigade was ordered by general Jean Victor de Constant Rebecque, chief of staff of the Netherlands Mobile Army, to take up position at the cross roads of Quatre Bras, because a French attack by Marshal Michel Ney was expected. Bylandt deployed a skirmish line of his 27th Jager Battalion and awaited developments. The next day the expected French attack came, and the Dutch troops (still without British support at this time) were hard pressed. Bylandt's brigade was concentrated around the Gémioncourt farm and the open fields east of the nearby Bossu woods.

The Dutch troops were finally relieved by the arrival of general Thomas Picton's Fifth British Division and the 2nd Dutch Light Cavalry Brigade (general Van Merlen) around 3 pm. After a hard-fought battle the Allies were left in command of the battlefield. Bylandt's brigade was now ordered to the vicinity of Waterloo.

What happened next is the subject of some controversy. The Duke of Wellington placed his allied army in two lines and a reserve behind a ridge on the north side of what would become the battlefield. The ridge was supposed to offer some cover for the Allied troops against artillery fire. At first, however, Bylandt's brigade was placed in front of this ridge on the evening of 17 June. The controversy concerns the question whether this supposed tactical error (the result of sloppy staff work) was remedied in time, before the brigade would have been exposed to the fire of the French Grand Battery. In many accounts of the battle it is asserted that the brigade (already depleted by the losses at Quatre Bras, numbering 11% of its original strength) in fact remained deployed in this exposed position and therefore suffered terribly during Napoleon's opening artillery barrage. But this is doubtful, because the after-battle report by the chief-of-staff of the 2nd Division (then captain) Van Zuylen van Nyevelt states that the brigade was in time moved to a safer position. The famous map of the battlefield by Bylandt's future father-in-law Willem Benjamin Craan and his appended explanatory note, also place the brigade in this safer position.

Craan's 1816 history of the battle therefore does not mention heavy casualties for Bylandt's brigade as a consequence of Napoleon's opening barrage of 80 guns, but instead blames the infantry charge by d'Erlon's divisions on the sector of the Allied front that the brigade occupied for these indeed heavy casualties. As the Dutch troops received several point-blank volleys, and because they were deployed in a thin line (to cover as much terrain as possible according to Craan) the French broke through their line and the remnants of two of the Militia battalions retreated in haste, until they were rallied by the 5th Militia Battalion, that was placed in reserve.

During this enemy action Bylandt himself was wounded and the command of the brigade was taken over by the commander of the 8th Militia Battalion, lt.-col. W. A. de Jongh. After the battle Bylandt received the Knight's Cross Third Class of the Military William Order for his gallantry.

=== Later career ===
After the return of the army to the new Kingdom of the United Netherlands Bylandt was appointed military governor of South-Brabant (which contained Brussels). He was military governor of that city when in 1830 the Belgian Revolution started. Because he acted less than decisively the situation soon got out of hand. He was blamed for this and put on non-active status on 24 November 1830. In the following years he published several pamphlets to defend his good name. He retired from the service in 1840 but was nevertheless promoted to lieutenant-general in 1843.

Bylandt died aged 84 on his estate at Prinsenhage, near Breda, in 1855.

== Sources ==
- (in Dutch) Aa, A.J. van der, et al. (1876) Biographisch woordenboek der Nederlanden, pp. 1703–1705
- (in Dutch) Winkler Prins, A. (1906) Winkler Prins' Geïllustreerde encyclopaedie, vol. 4, p. 532
