= Rumah Cililitan Besar =

Dutch colonial country house in Jakarta, Indonesia

Coordinates: 6.268904°S 106.870743°E

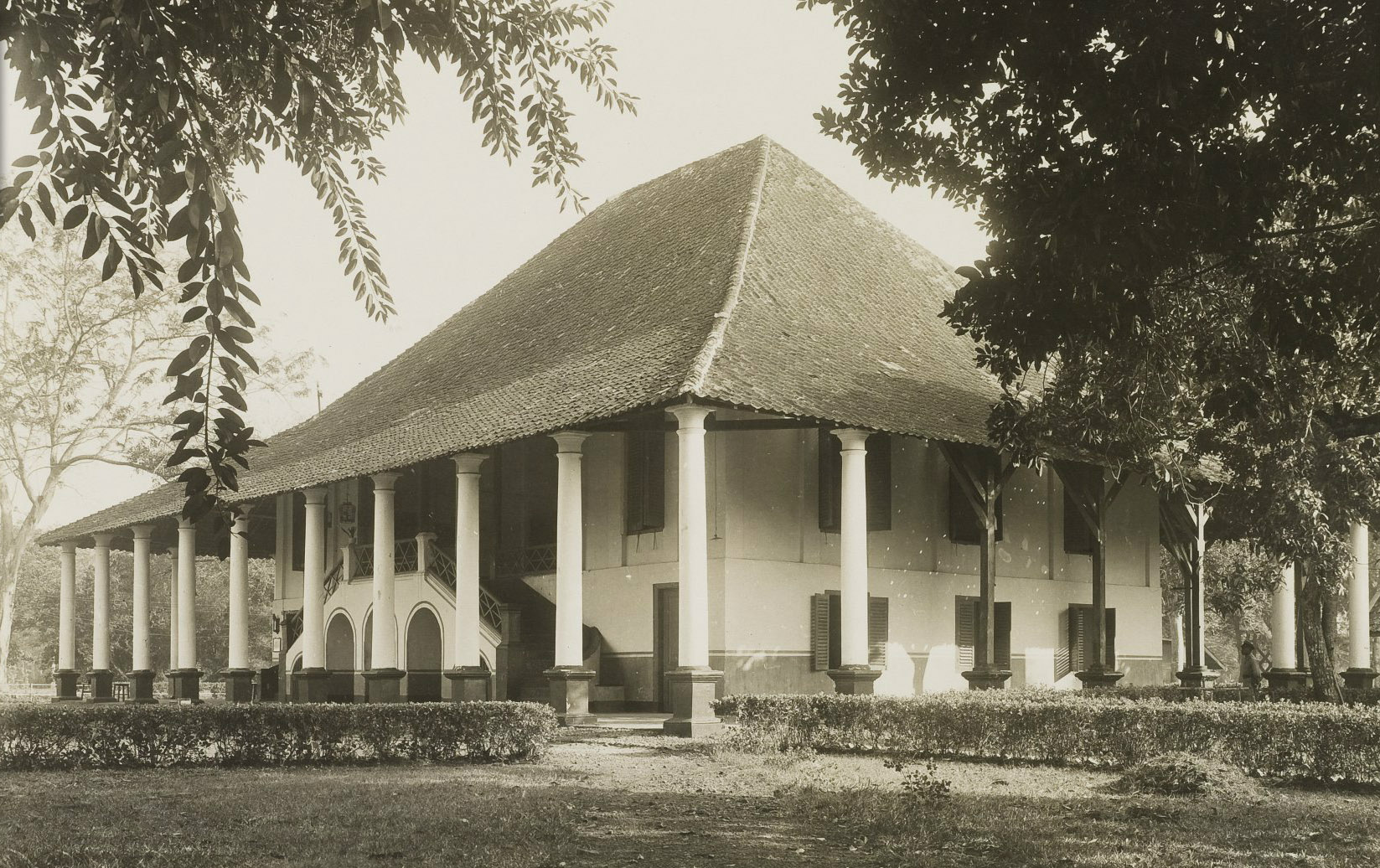
Rumah Cililitan Besar around 1930s.

Rumah Cililitan Besar ("Cililitan Besar House"), also known as simply Cililitan Besar or Lebak Sirih, is a former Dutch colonial country house located in Kramat Jati, Jakarta. It was known in Dutch as Landhuis Tjililitan Besar. It is located next to the complex of Soekanto Indonesian National Police Hospital. The architecture style of the building is a prototype for a late 19th century Dutch country house style known as the transitional Dutch Indies style.

== History and conservation status ==
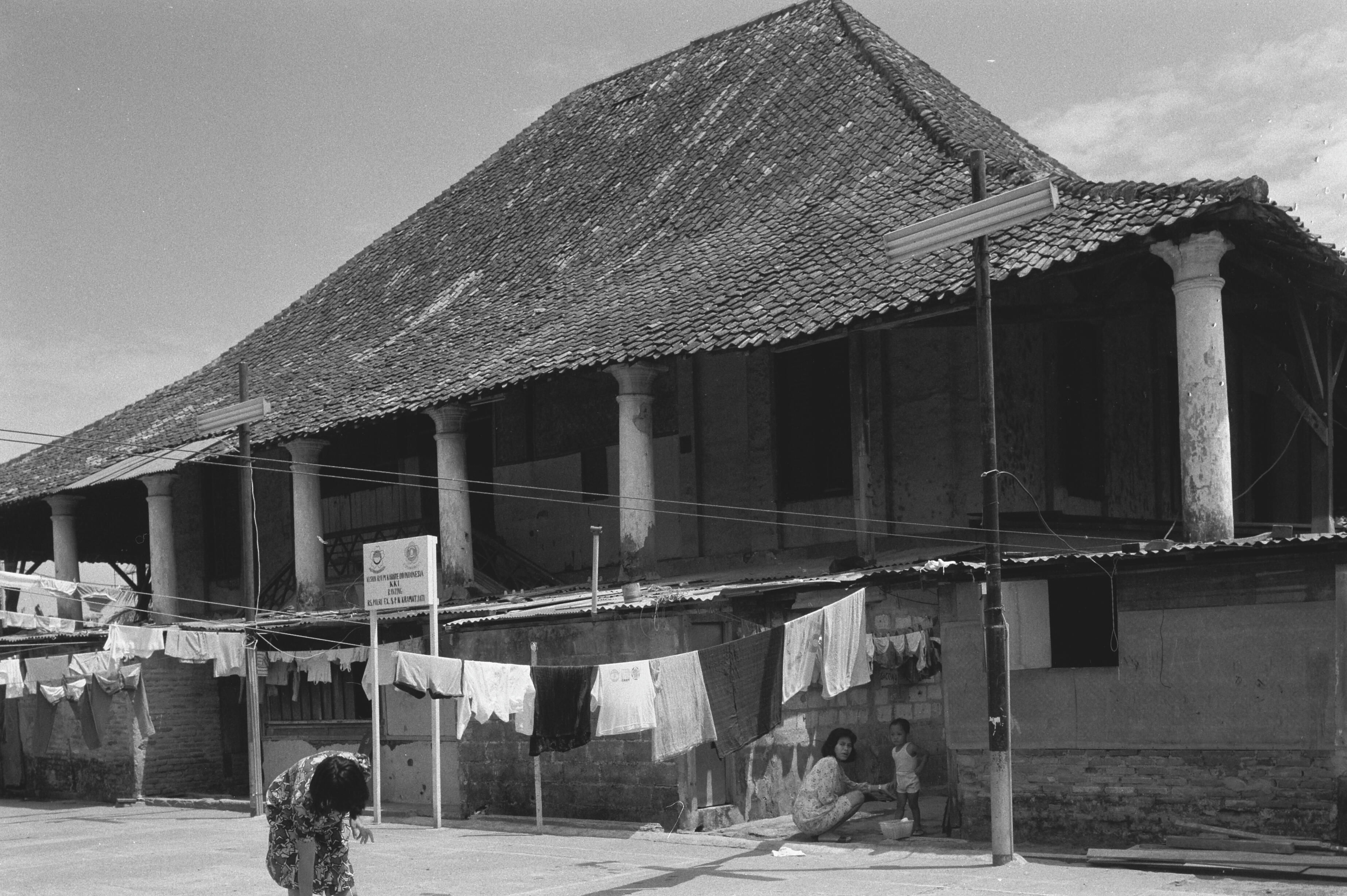
Rumah Cililitan Besar in 1988 already deteriorates thanks to the police dormitories built around the former mansion.

The building was formerly the estate of Hendrik Laurens van der Crap, built circa 1775 as a resting place outside Batavia because Batavia was in unhealthy condition following malaria outbreak. During the World War II, the house was occupied by captain Kentaro Tanaka, commander of Kampong Makassar internment camp. After World War II, the building was used as police dormitory, and later left to deteriorate. Since the 1980s, the house has been slowly reoccupied by squatters until its deteriorating condition today. Despite its status as a protected heritage of Jakarta, the structure has been left to deteriorate.

== Transitional Dutch Indies style ==
Rumah Besar Cililitan was a prototype for a style known as transitional Dutch Indies style, which is a transitional style between earlier Dutch style country house (e.g. National Archives of Indonesia) and Indies style country house (e.g. Tjitrap House). The structure and form of this type of country house reveals a process of gradual adaptation to the tropical climate of Indonesia. It is a two-storeyed structure, typical of its original Dutch-style house, but with extremely large overhanging roof which projects on all sides, similar with the Javanese joglo-style roof, usually served for Javanese noblemen. The upper floor is reached by external staircase. Tall windows with louvered shutters ensured good ventilation.

== See also ==
- Dutch Indies country houses
- List of colonial buildings and structures in Jakarta
