= Landhuis =

Colonial-style house and administrative heart

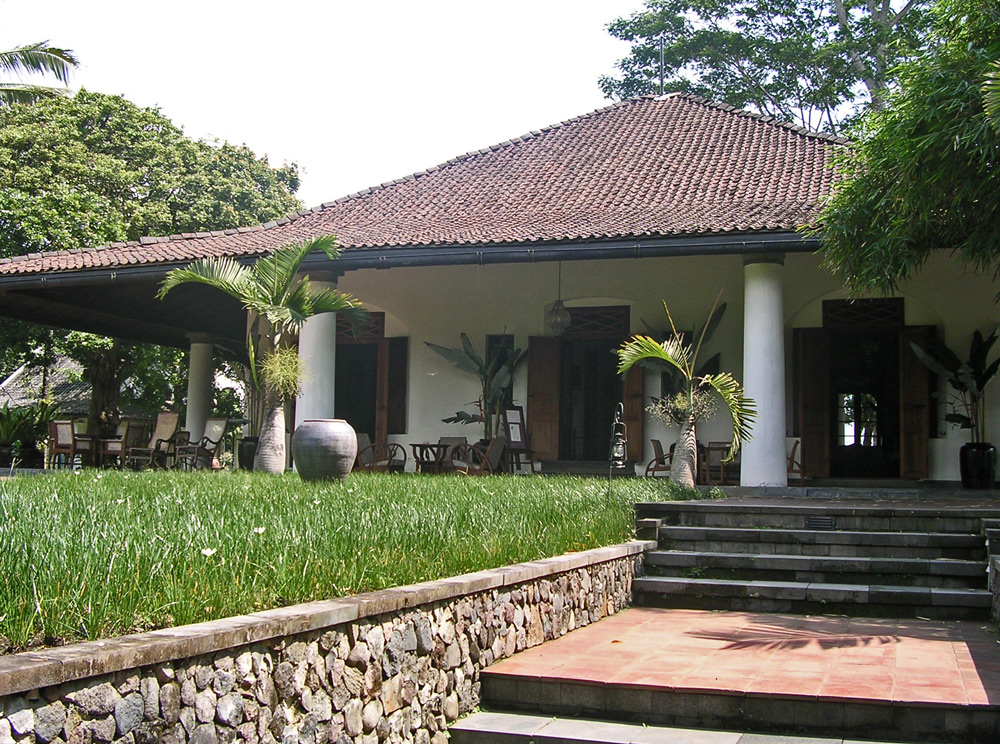
1928 coffee plantation villa in Indies style, near Magelang, Central Java.

A landhuis (Dutch for "mansion, manor", plural landhuizen; Indonesian: rumah kongsi; Papiamento: kas di shon or kas grandi) is a Dutch colonial country house, often the administrative heart of a particuliere land or private domain in the Dutch East Indies, now Indonesia. Many country houses were built by the Dutch in other colonial settlements, such as Galle, Cape Town and Curaçao, but none as extensively or elaborately as in the Residency of Batavia (an area that includes parts of modern-day Jakarta, West Java and Banten provinces). Much of Batavia's reputation as "Queen of the East" rested on the grandeur of these 18th-century mansions.

They were conceived as replicas of the Dutch architecture. Later, designs included features from Javanese vernacular architecture, partly in response to the tropical climate. The result, a fusion of Western and Javanese architecture, became known later as the 'Indies Style' from the Dutch East Indies. The Indies Style is the first form of a fusion of Dutch and local architecture which gave rise to the subsequent style of early Dutch Rationalist architecture in Indonesia. Despite its heritage and protected status, many of the Indies' country houses were left to deteriorate or were demolished, often due to lack of maintenance. Many of these houses were within the complex owned by the National Police. Many were transformed into dormitories with improper preservation.

== History ==
In 17th century Netherlands, the increasing importance of Holland as a major maritime nation with a growing commercial empire, particularly in the East, had generated capital for the merchant classes of Amsterdam. These increasingly wealthy merchants began to invest their profits in second residences outside Amsterdam. This second residence, or landhuizen, ranged from modest rural retreats to luxurious manor houses, and were typically seated along the rivers Amstel and Vecht. In Batavia, a similar trend occurred in the middle 18th century. When Batavia grew increasingly unhealthy during the 18th century, wealthy Dutch East India Company officials were the first to flee and build grand houses in the surrounding countryside, typically situated between the rivers and roads that led into Batavia.

The officials of the Dutch East India Company built country houses outside the walled city Batavia when the Ommelanden (the hinterland that lay immediately beyond the walled city) had been pacified and kept free from attacks by Javanese insurgents, who were trying to evict the Dutch occupiers. This was achieved by establishing a circular line of fortified field posts at places like Antjol, Jacatra, Noordwijk, Rijswijk, Angke, and Vijfhoek; most of which were established in the middle 17th century.

The first houses were simple structures, but as time went by, these became opulent country houses in luxurious pleasure gardens, often with their own music pavilion and belfry.

== Indies Style ==
The Indies Style appeared very pronounced in the country houses of the Dutch Indies. This style appeared in late 18th-century and gradually adapted to the tropical climate. The style can be divided into three major archetypes: Dutch Style country houses, Transitional Dutch Indies country houses, and Indies style country houses. At least one of each of the styles survived as of 2015.

=== Dutch Style country houses ===
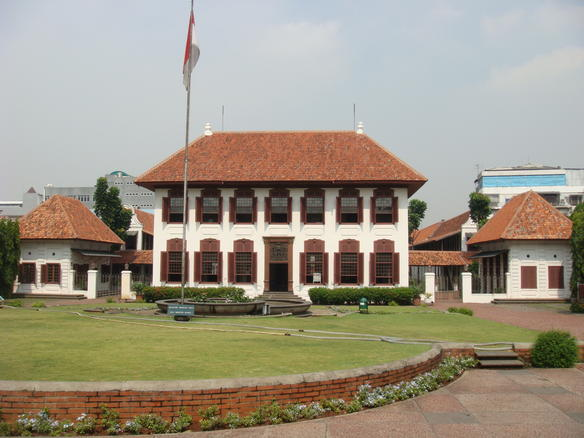
Reynier de Klerck house, now known as the National Archives building, one of the few Indies country houses of this type that survives to this day.

Country houses in the Dutch Style (Nederlandse stijl) were popular between 1730 and 1770. They are typically a two-story structure of near replicas of their Dutch counterparts. The Dutch influences are evident in the hipped roof, closed and solid facade and high windows. They often came with belfries, a musical pavilion and a European pleasure garden. The only concession to the tropical climate is the relatively large roof overhang compared with the originals. Unlike their Dutch counterparts, Batavian estates included extensive ancillary quarters to accommodate servants, often in the rear of the house. The interior was usually larger than its Dutch counterpart, with a much taller ceiling.

Samples are Weltevreden country house, Groeneveld House in Condet, Reynier de Klerck country house (now the building of the National Archives of Indonesia), and Jan Schreuder country house.

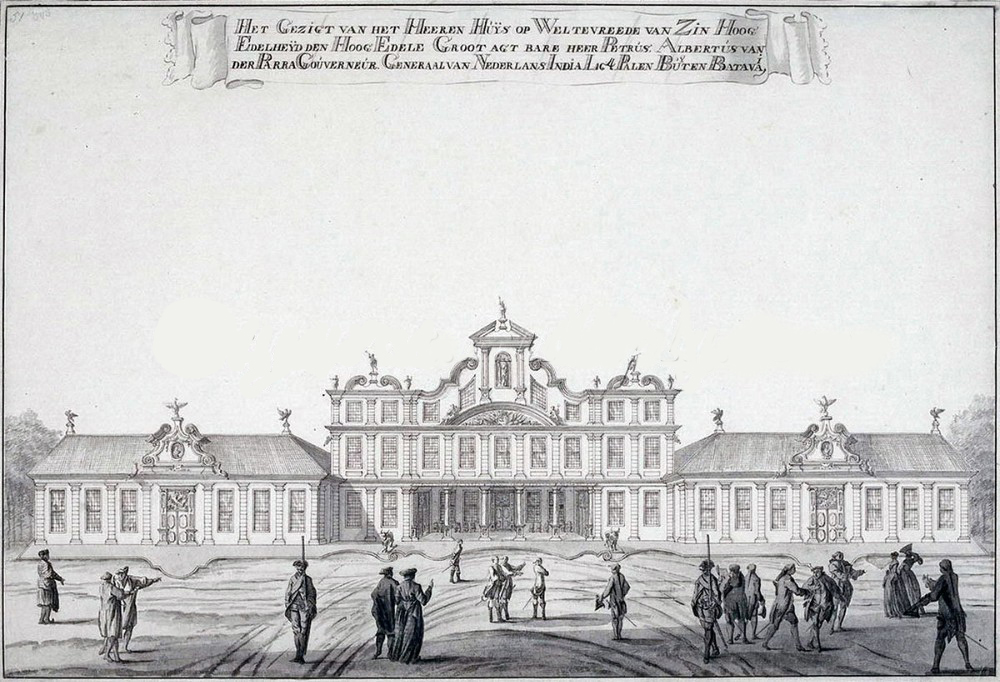
Weltevreden country house (1761) built by governor general Jacob Mossel

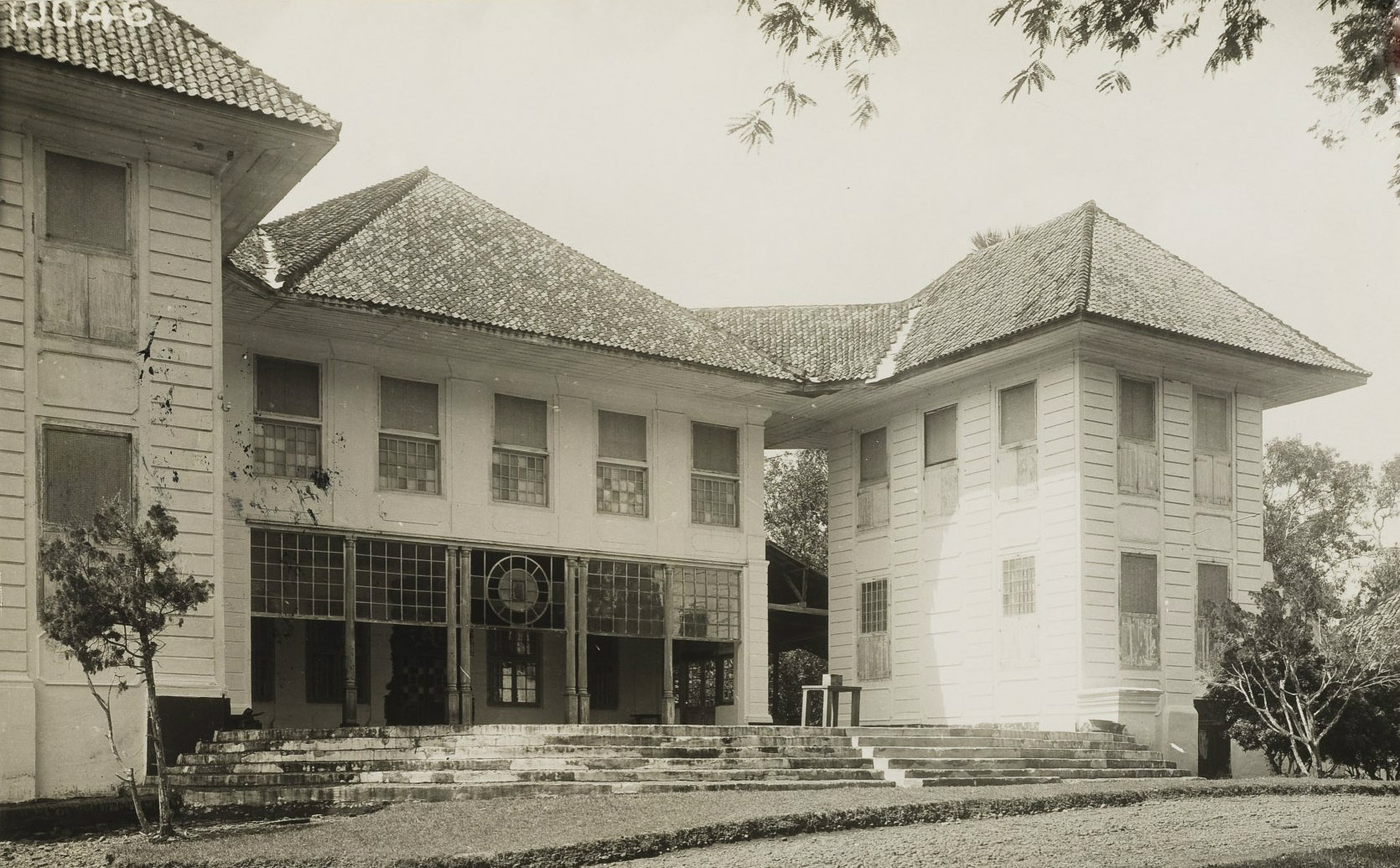
the Tanjung East (1760), instrumental in the growing of the Betawi Condet culture.

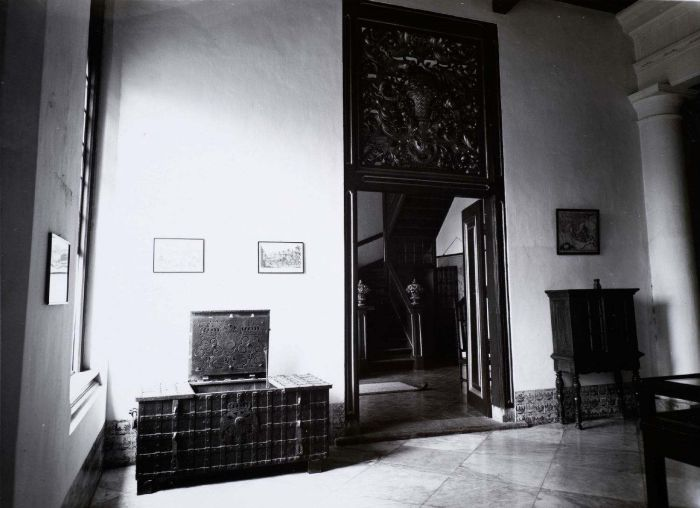
Interior of National Archive building showing one of the four heavily ornate doors.

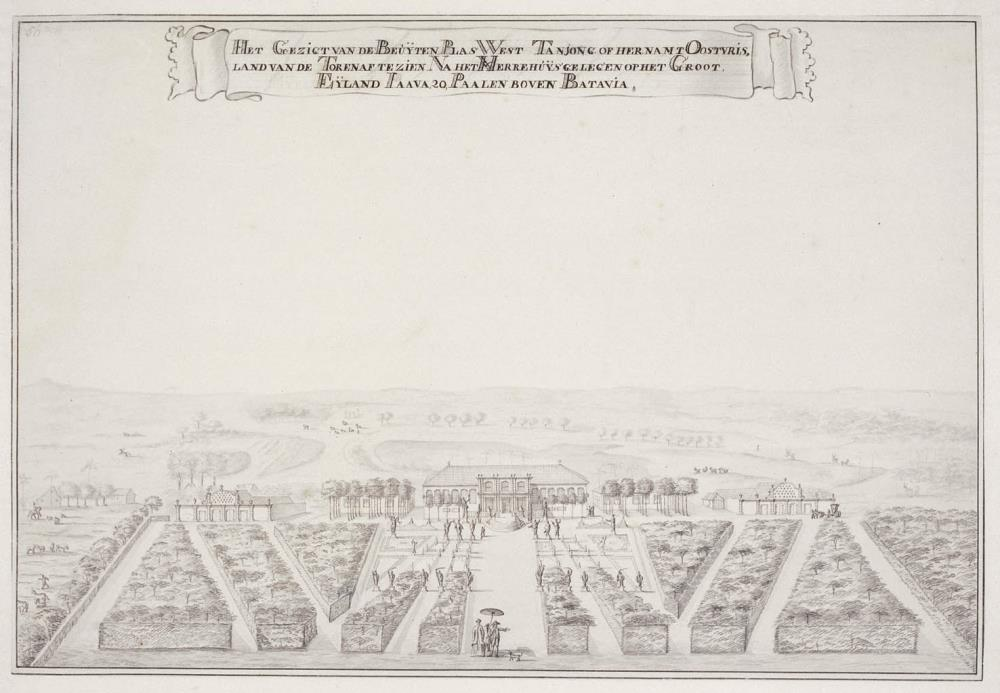
mid-18th century Tanjung West mansion features a vast pleasure garden.

=== Transitional Dutch Indies country houses ===
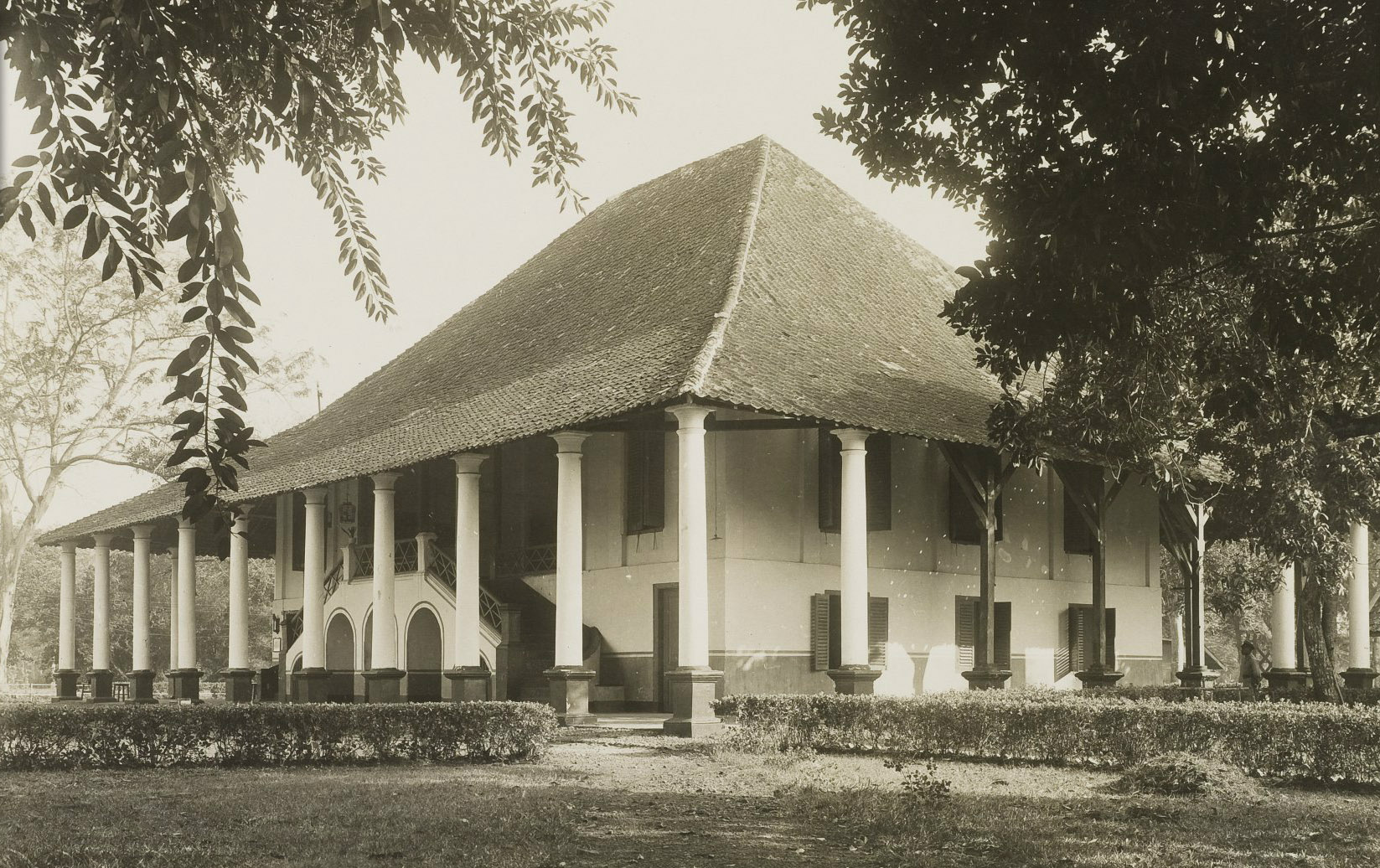
Rumah Cililitan Besar, the prototype of the Transitional Dutch Indies country houses, can still be seen today, but in a neglected condition.

These Nederlands-Indische stijl appeared between 1750 and 1800. Their structure and form show acculturation to the tropical climate. Still a two-story structure, the facades are protected from the sun and heavy rain by a large overhanging roof on all sides. The roof profile resembles the local joglo-style roof traditionally reserved for Javanese noblemen. The upper floor is usually reached by an external staircase and often the central portion was left open for maximum ventilation; as well as tall windows with louvered shutters. The style was also popular in Sumatra.

Samples include Rumah Cililitan Besar (1775), which is still in existence, although deteriorating. Other examples are Pondok Gedeh country house and Cengkareng country house.

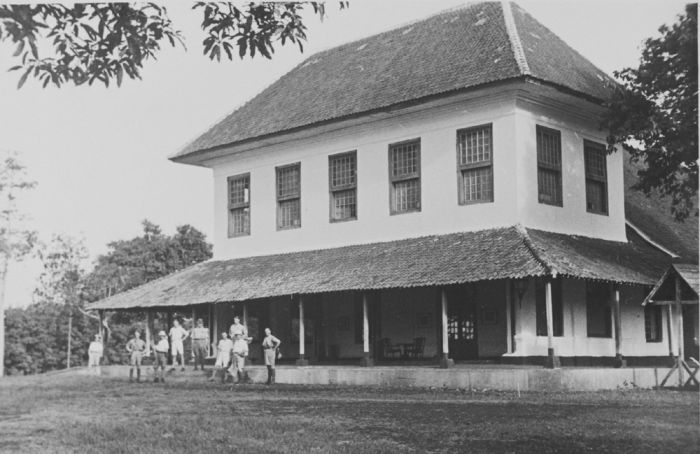
Landhuis Pondok Gede shows gradual evolution from the previous style into the transitional style.

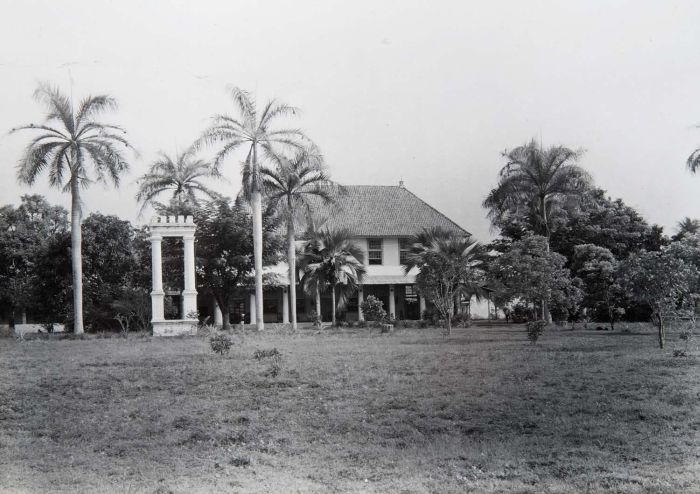
Landhuis Cengkareng was built in 1760 by Michiel Romp.

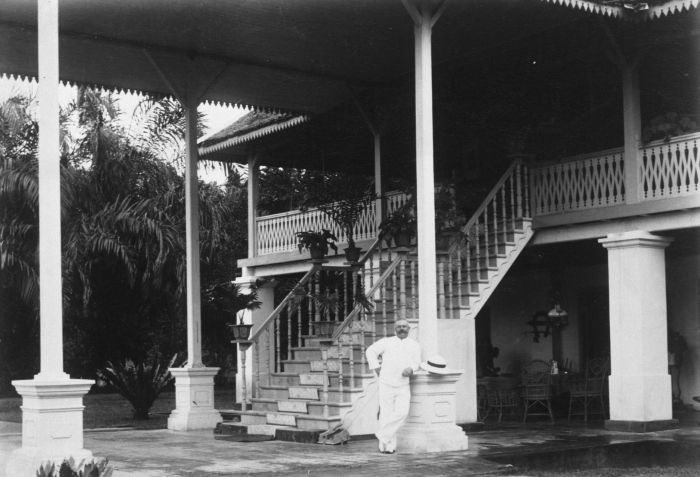
A house in North Sumatra.

=== Indies-style country houses ===
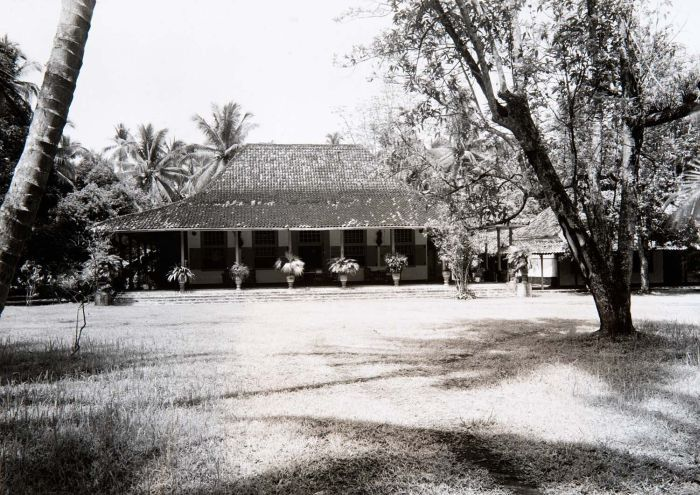
Landhuis Depan in Batavia.

Also known as Indo-European house (Indo Europeesche Stijl) or Indische stijl, this type appeared between 1790 and 1820. The form represents the fusion of Dutch and indigenous (Javanese) style. Indies-style country houses were usually built as a single-story structure with front verandahs (pringgitan) and rear verandahs (gadri), covered by a joglo-type pitched roof that extended over the verandahs. Often the verandahs were connected to side galleries for weather protection. The verandah often had potted palms, cool concrete or marble tiles covered with split bamboo mats. The western reference appears in the neo-classical Tuscan columns supporting the large roof overhang and the decorated doors and windows.

The style was replicated all around the archipelago in the later period. One of the few surviving examples is the dilapidated Cimanggis House, whose roof collapsed before 2013, but has since been restored into a museum. Other examples are Japan House (built for Andries Hartsinck by the end of 18th century, demolished in 1996), Tjitrap (Citeureup) house, Telukpucung house, Camis house and Tjilodong (Cilodong) house.

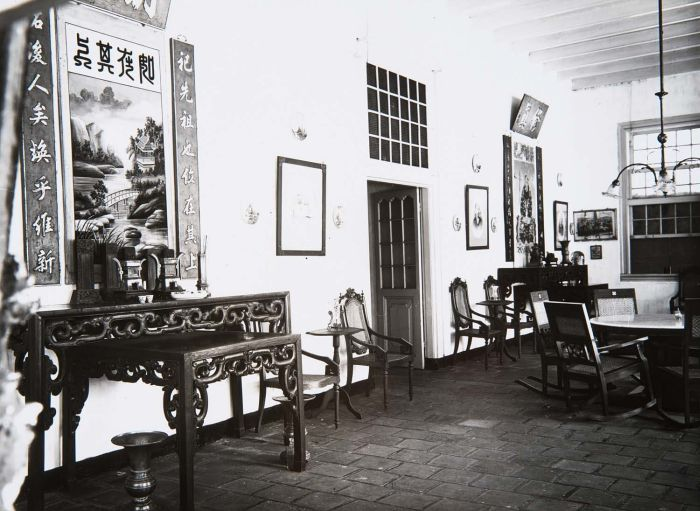
The front verandah of the landhuis Depan in Batavia.

== Decline ==
With the dissolution of the VOC, country houses became less popular. During the 19th century, two groups of architectural movements occupied the Dutch East Indies: the universally accepted but fading Neoclassical style, appropriate for a colonial empire; and the Modernist, which gave rise to a neo-vernacular school that combined with Art Deco to create a tropical style dubbed as New Indies Style. Whereas the earlier Indies Style were essentially Indonesian houses with European trim, by the early 20th century, the trend was for modernist influences to be expressed in essentially European buildings with Indonesian trim. Practical measures carried over from the earlier Indies Style, which responded to the Indonesian climate, included overhanging eaves, larger windows and ventilation in the walls.

== See also ==
- Architecture of Indonesia
- Colonial architecture of Indonesia
- List of colonial buildings and structures in Jakarta
- Indies Empire style
- New Indies Style
- Rumah adat
- Rumah Melayu
- Sino-Portuguese architecture
- Nipa hut
- Bahay na bato
