= Adriana Bake =

Influential hostess and benefactor in the Dutch East Indies

Adriana Johanna Bake
- Born: 1724
- Died: 1787
- Occupation(s): Hostess, influential figure in Batavia
- Known for: Wife of the Governor-General of the Dutch East Indies
- Spouse(s): Anthonij Guldenarm (m. before 1743), Petrus Albertus van der Parra (m. 1743)
- Parent(s): David Johan Bake, Ida Dudde

Adriana Johanna Bake (1724–1787) was the wife of the Governor-General of the Dutch East Indies and an influential figure in the Dutch colony of Batavia.

Adriana Bake was born to David Johan Bake (1689–1738), governor of Amboina, and Ida Dudde (1691–1766). She married commander Anthonij Guldenarm (1701–1743), and in 1743 Petrus Albertus van der Parra (1714–1775), governor general of Batavia from 1755 to 1775.

Adriana Bake was the first governor's wife not born in the Netherlands, and in the position, she became the first hostess of Weltevreden in 1763, and known as the hostess of many spectacular parties with theater, dance and illuminations and festivals. Her hospitality, simple taste and pious nature, not common in contemporary colonial society, were admired: she financed translations of the Bible, converted her slaves and freed them in her will. Adriana Bake was depicted as an ideal wife in the contemporary Dutch colony and her family life as a role model for other colonial families. She was the foster mother of a large network of East Indies foster children, many of whom were later to become power holders in the Dutch East Indies.
