= National Archives Building, Jakarta =

Museum in Indonesia

National Archives Building
- Gedung Arsip Nasional
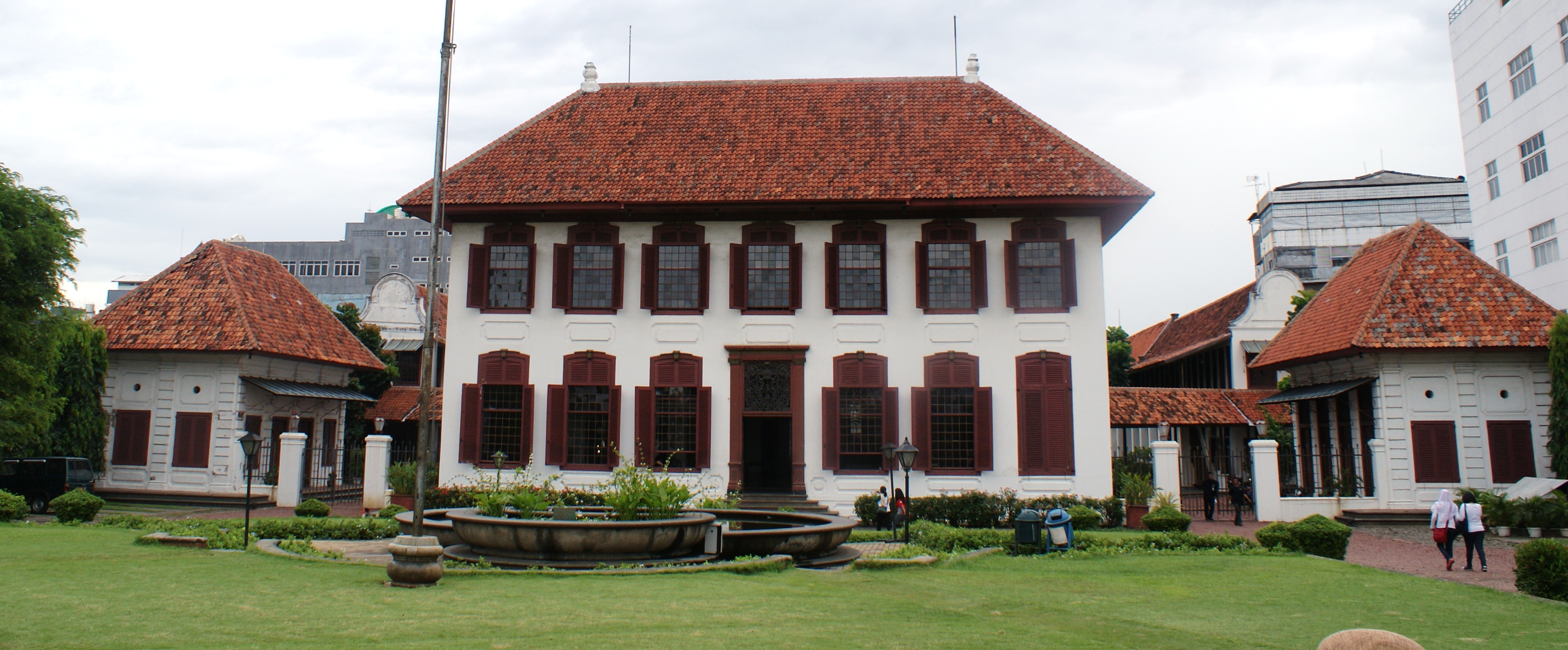
- National Archives Building

- Location within Jakarta Location within Indonesia

General information
- Status: Restored
- Type: Museum
- Architectural style: Old Indies style
- Location: Jakarta, Indonesia, Jalan Gajah Mada no. 111
- Coordinates: 6°9′14″S 106°49′1″E
- Groundbreaking: 1755
- Estimated completion: 1760

Design and construction
- Architect: anonymous

Other information
- Public transit: Mangga Besar

The National Archives Building (Indonesian: Gedung Arsip Nasional) is the building of the Government Museum in Jakarta, Indonesia. The building, formerly a late 18th-century private residence of Governor-General Reinier de Klerk, is part of the cultural heritage of Jakarta. The house is an archetypal Indies-Style house of the earliest period.

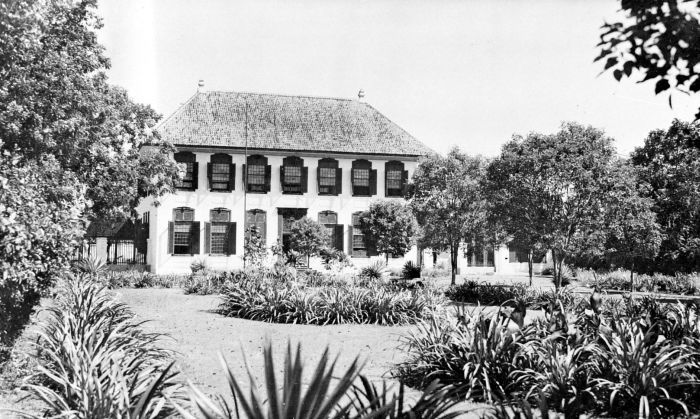
The building in the 1930s

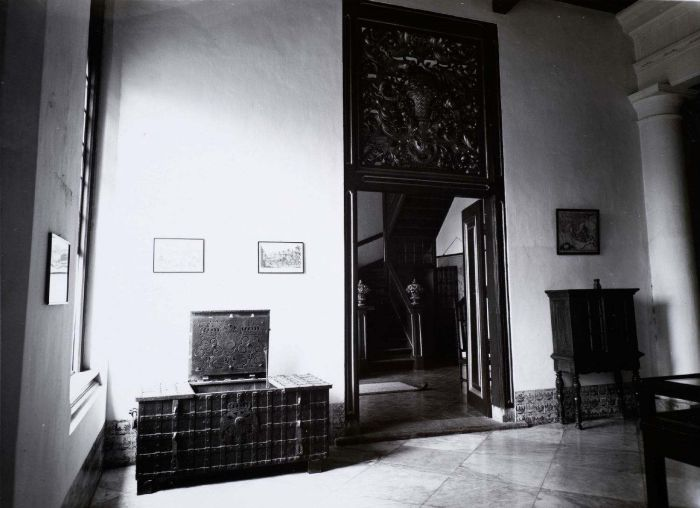
Interior of the National Archives Building

== Cited works ==
- Akihary, Huib (1990). Architectuur & Stedebouw in Indonesië 1870/1970. Zutphen: De Walburg Pers. ISBN 9072691024.
- de Haan, F. (1922). Oud Batavia - Eerste en tweede deel. Batavia: G. Kolff & Co.
- Gill, Ronald (1998). Gunawan Tjahjono (ed.). Country Houses in the 18th Century. Indonesian Heritage - Architecture. Vol. 6. Singapore: Archipelago Press. ISBN 981-3018-30-5.
- Het Indische bouwen: architectuur en stedebouw in Indonesie : Dutch and Indisch architecture 1800-1950. Helmond: Gemeentemuseum Helmond. 1990.
- Messakh, Matheos V. (July 15, 2008). "A home truth about the house of a Dutch governor-general". The Jakarta Post. PT. Niskala Media Tenggara. Archived from the original on July 26, 2008.
- Taylor, Jean Gelman (1983). The Social World of Batavia: European and Eurasian in Dutch Asia (illustrated ed.). Madison: The University of Wisconsin Press. ISBN 9780299094706.
