= Petrus Albertus van der Parra =

Dutch East Indian governor-general

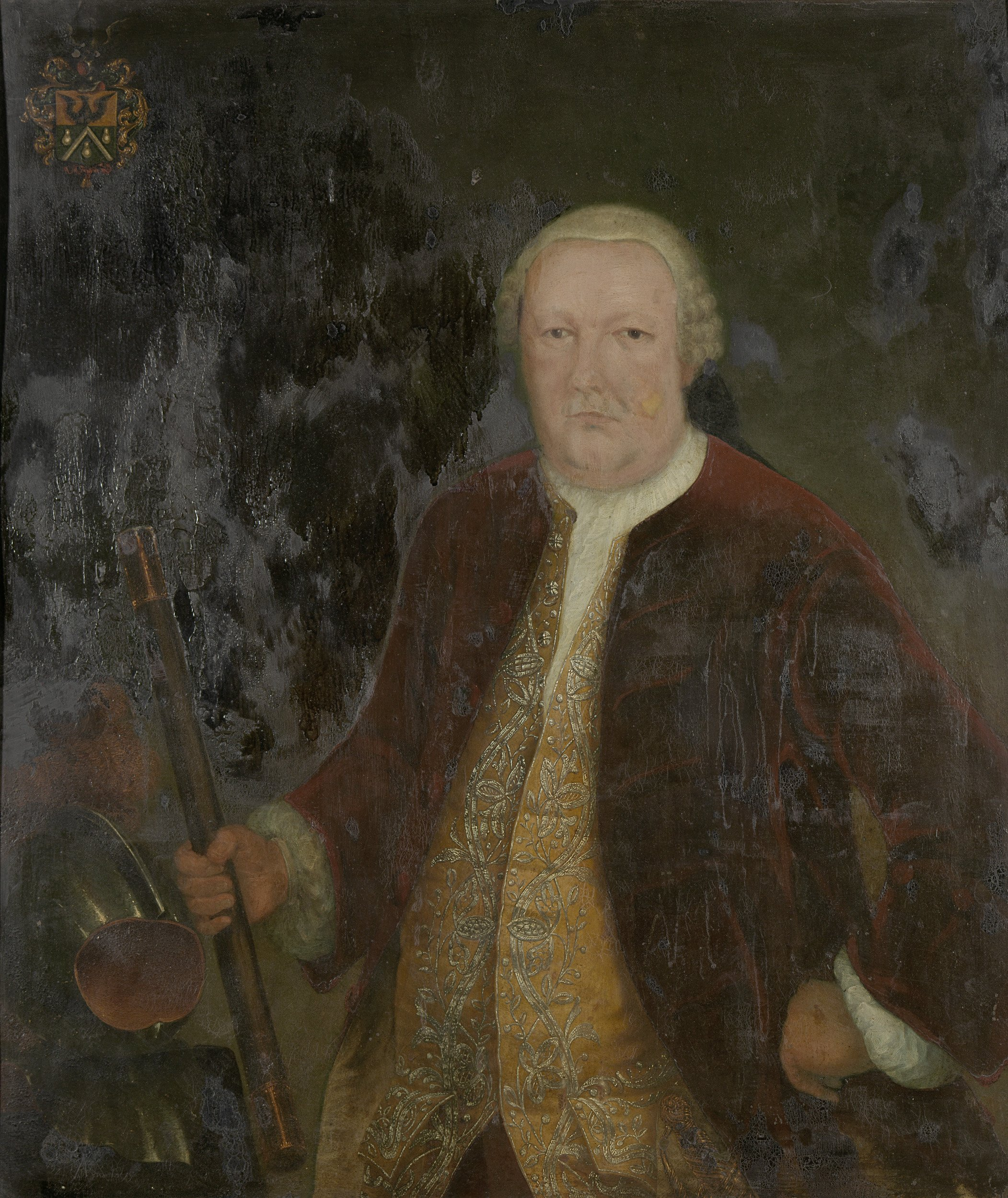
- Anonymous portrait, c. 1761–1765

Governor-General of the Dutch East Indies
- In office 15 May 1761 – 28 December 1775
- Preceded by: Jacob Mossel
- Succeeded by: Jeremias van Riemsdijk

Personal details
- Born: 29 September 1714 Colombo, Dutch Ceylon (present‑day Sri Lanka)
- Died: 28 December 1775 (aged 61) Batavia, Dutch East Indies (present‑day Indonesia)

Petrus Albertus van der Parra (29 September 1714 – 28 December 1775) was Governor-General of the Dutch East Indies from 1761 to 1775.

== Biography ==
Petrus Albertus van der Parra was born in Colombo, the son of a Secretary to the government of Ceylon. His great-grandfather had come to India and the family has lived there ever since. In 1728, he began his career at fourteen years old. As everyone had to start as a soldier, he began as a "soldaat van de penne", then became an "assistent" in 1731, and "boekhouder" (bookkeeper) in 1732. He had to move house in 1736 to take up a new job as "onderkoopman" (underbuyer/undermerchant), and at the same time "collectionist" (collector) and "boekhouder" to the General Secretary at Batavia/Jakarta. He became "koopman" (buyer/merchant) and "geheimschrijver" (secrets secretary) in 1739. He became Second Secretary to the High Government (Hoge Regering), becoming First Secretary in 1747. He became Counsellor-extraordinary of the Indies later that year (November) and in 1751 became a regular Counsellor. In 1752 he became President of the College van Heemraden (in charge of estate boundaries, roads, etc.). He was later a member of the "Schepenbank" (the local government and court in Batavia), a Regent (a board member) of the hospital and in 1755 he became First Counsellor and Director-General (Eerste Raad en Directeur-Generaal)

On 15 May 1761, following the death of Jacob Mossel, he became Governor-General of the Dutch East Indies. Confirmation of his appointment by the Heren XVII (the Seventeen Lords, who controlled the Dutch East India Company) came in 1762. He held a lavish inauguration on his birthday on 29 September.

Subsequently, his birthday was a national holiday in the Indies. During his time as Governor-General, he overthrew the Prince of Kandy, in Ceylon, though with difficulty, and he conquered the sultanate of Siak in Sumatra. Contracts were entered into with various regional leaders in Bima, Soembawa, Dompo, Tambora, Sangar and Papekat.

Van der Parra often gave out well-paid posts to his friends if he could get anything in return for them. Preachers in Batavia got gifts, translations of the New Testament and scholarships from Van der Parra. Although the Heren XVII knew about his behaviour, as five Counsellors had written to them about his pretensions to kingly behaviour, they did nothing about it.

In 1770, Captain James Cook had to ask for his help to proceed on his journeys on HMS Endeavour (See Captain Cook's Journal, First Voyage/Chapter 9). At the end of the 19th century, a steamship trading to the Indies was named after him.

After over fourteen years in power, he died on 28 September 1775 in Weltevreden, the imposing palace built for him outside Batavia. He left a large part of his fortune to the widows of Colombo, with the remainder going to the poor of Batavia. He was followed as governor by Jeremias van Riemsdijk

He was married to Adriana Johanna Bake.

== Sources ==
- Comprehensive Dutch website on the history of the Dutch Eat Indies "Petrus Albertus van der Parra". Archived from the original on 2005-08-29.
- "Biographical Dictionary - Gustaaf Willem baron Van Imhoff" (in Dutch). Archived from the original on 2009-01-01.
- L. P. van Putten, Ambitie en Onvermogen, Gouverneurs-generaal van Nederlands-Indië, Rotterdam, 2002
- Jan N. Bremmer, Lourens van den Bosch Between Poverty and the Pyre: Moments in the History of Widowhood Routledge, 1995 ISBN 0-415-08370-2, ISBN 978-0-415-08370-6
