= Jeremias van Riemsdijk =

Dutch colonial governor (1712–1777)

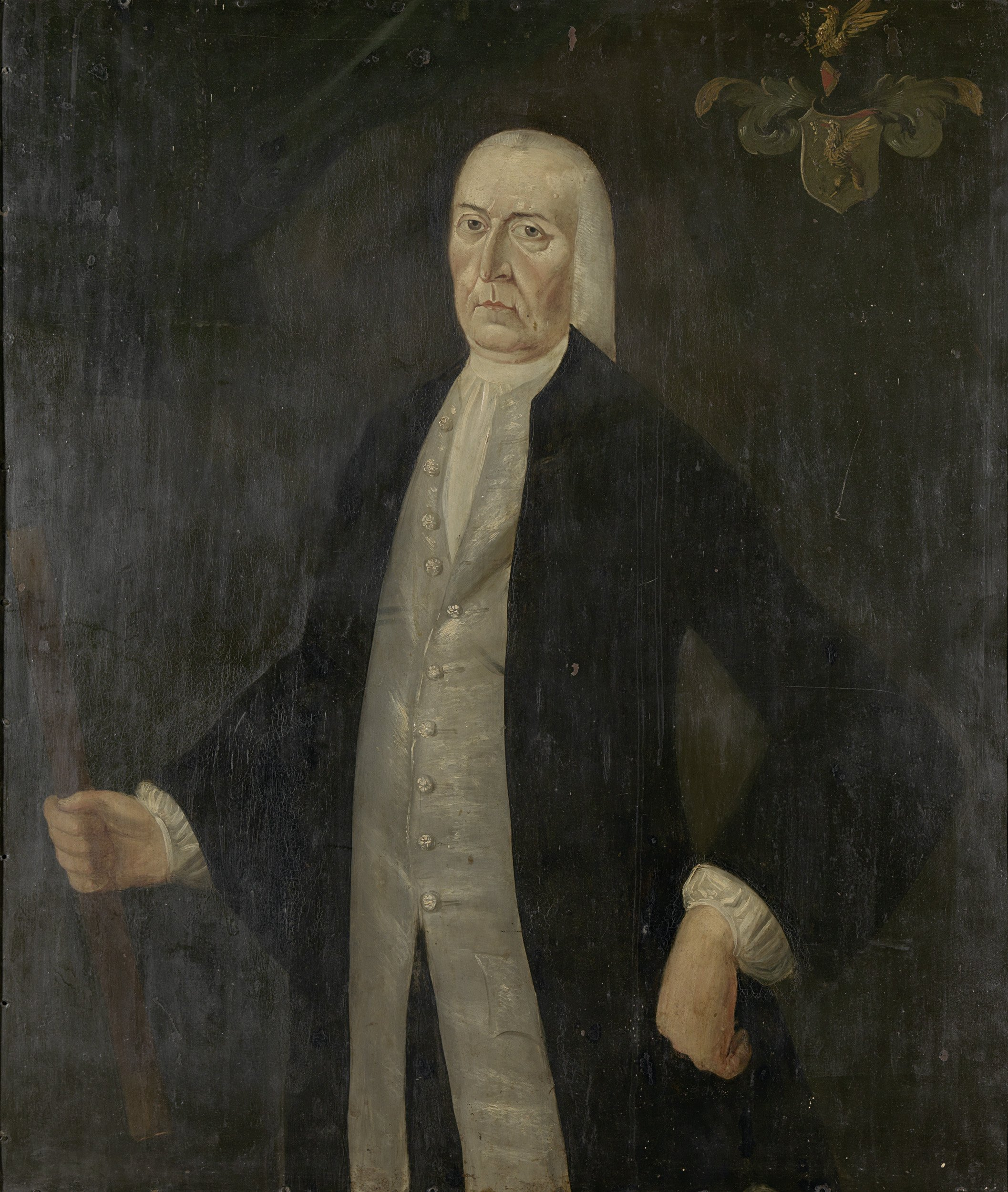
- Portrait by Josephus Fricot, c. 1775–1777

Governor-General of the Dutch East Indies
- In office 28 December 1775 – 3 October 1777
- Preceded by: Petrus Albertus van der Parra
- Succeeded by: Reynier de Klerck

Personal details
- Born: 18 October 1712 Utrecht, Dutch Republic
- Died: 3 October 1777 (aged 64) Batavia, Dutch East Indies (present‑day Indonesia)

Jeremias van Riemsdijk (18 October 1712 – 3 October 1777) was a Dutch colonial administrator who served as Governor-General of the Dutch East Indies from 1775 to 1777.

Jeremias van Riemsdijk was born on 18 October 1712 in Utrecht, the son to Scipio van Riemsdijk, the minister of Bunnik near Houten, and Johanna Bogaert. He entered service with the Dutch East India Company as a sergeant left for the Indies, aboard the van de Proostwijk, on 25 February 1735. Very shortly after his arrival in Batavia/Jakarta on 14 September 1735, he entered the civil (as opposed to military) service. Jeremias was the nephew of the future Governor-General Adriaan Valckenier (1737-1741), who at the time was still a member of the Dutch Council of the Indies. H could therefore expect to make rapid progress in his career.

In 1736 he became onderkoopman (underbuyer/undermerchant), in 1738 koopman (buyer/merchant), in 1740 tweede opperkoopman (second upperbuyer/uppermerchant) and in 1742 eerste opperkoopman (first upperbuyer/uppermerchant) in the castle headquarters at Batavia/Jakarta. In 1743 he became the chief (kapitein) of the company of clerical/writing staff (pennisten) and in October Jeremias van Riemsdijk was named Counsellor-extraordinary (Raad extra-ordinaier) to the Council of the Indies. In 1759 he was appointed President of the College van Weesmeesters (dealing with the affairs of orphans, minors, etc.). On 15 October 1760 he was named ordinary Counsellor (Raad ordinair) and on 17 August 1764 Director-General.

On 28 December 1775, following the death of Petrus Albertus van der Parra, Van Riemsdijk was chosen as Governor-General. He had had at the time five marriages, to leading Eurasian ladies. He had learned a lot from the eleven years he had worked with his predecessor, whose great appetite for money he had acquired. During his term in office, there was a shortage of ships and ship personnel. This problem was solved with help from the homeland. However, shortly after his governorship had begun, Jeremias van Riemsdijk died in Batavia/Jakarta. He was followed as Governor-General by Reynier de Klerck

== Sources ==
- Complete site (in Dutch) on the Dutch East India Company
- Encyclopaedie van Nederlandsch-Indië, part N-Soek
- Putten, L. P. van, 2002. Ambitie en onvermogen: gouverneurs-generaal van Nederlands-Indië 1610–1796.
- Van Riemsdijk family history
