= Willem Benjamin Craan =

Dutch surveyor

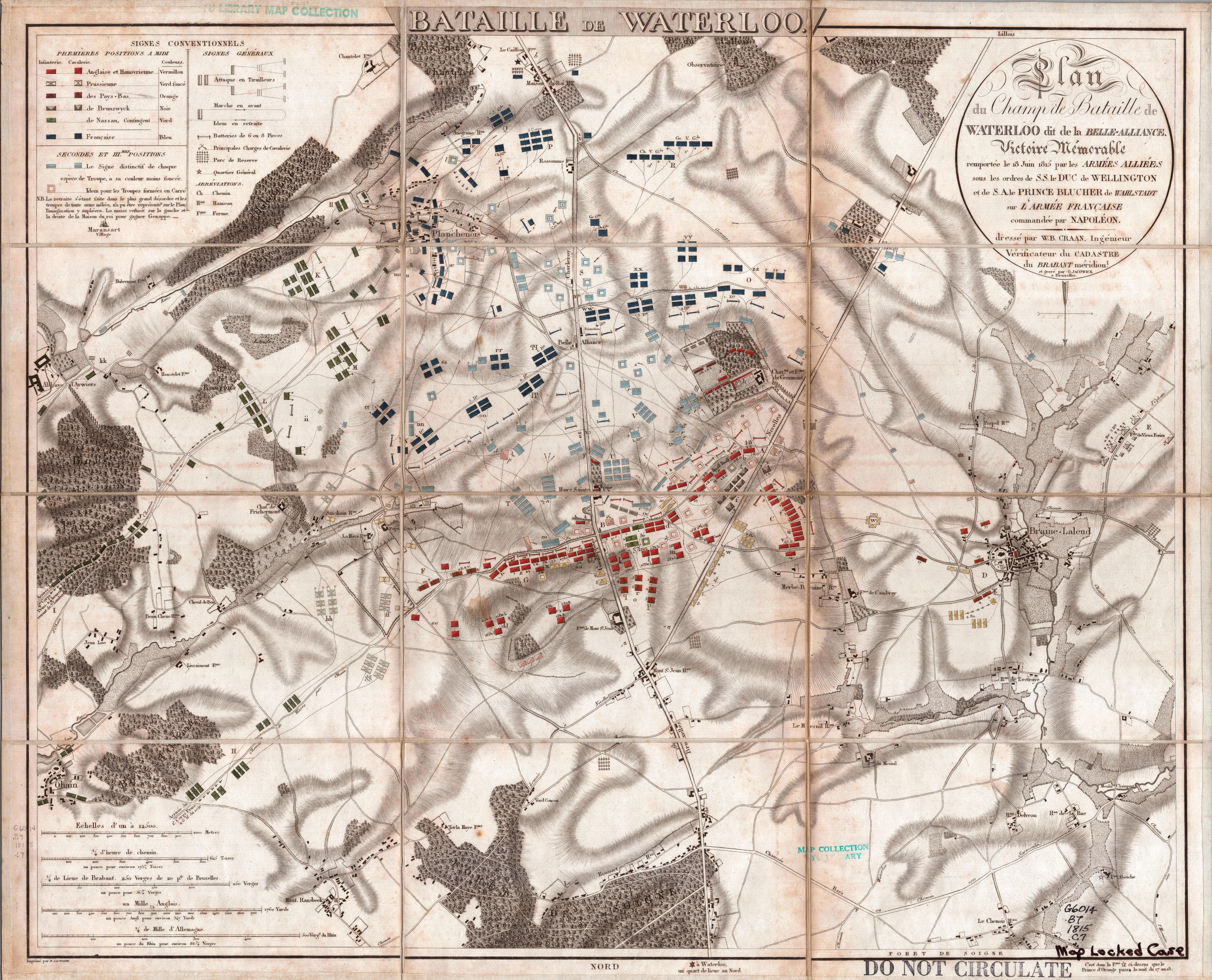
Craan's 1816 map of the Battle of Waterloo

Willem Benjamin Craan (Batavia, 23 August 1776 — Schaerbeek, 16 June 1848) was a Dutch (and later Belgian) surveyor and cartographer, who is best known for his 1816 map of the battlefield of the Battle of Waterloo in which he provided the initial dispositions of all armies concerned, based on information gleaned from many participants in the battle from all sides.

== Biography ==
=== Early career ===
Craan was born in the Dutch East Indies, a colony of the Dutch East India Company in those days. He was the son of Jacobus Johannes Craan and Johanna Henriëtte Breekpot. His father was an opperkoopman (chief merchant), employed by the company. He married Joanna Frederika Hahn on 4 October 1795 in Hillegom. Craan studied at Leiden University and obtained a doctorate in law on 27 August 1795 (the Batavian Republic had just been established). He was not very interested in the law profession, however, dedicating himself in the next fifteen years to mathematical studies and music.

When he found himself in Aix-la-Chapelle in December, 1810, he was appointed by the local prefect to the position of cadastral surveyor for the département de la Roer (one of the départements of the First French Empire to which the Netherlands had by then been annexed). He performed so well in this function that the next year he was promoted and put in charge of the Cadastre of the département de la Lippe (in Germany).

The fall of the Empire in 1814 put him out of work, so he travelled to Brussels, then the capital of the former Austrian Netherlands, which now were about to become part of the United Kingdom of the Netherlands. The Sovereign Prince of the Netherlands (the future king William I of the Netherlands) appointed him as chief of the Cadastre of the department of the Dyle on 21 October 1814.

=== Map of the Battle of Waterloo ===
On 18 June 1815 the Battle of Waterloo was fought. As the battlefield was close to Brussels, and many wounded of all armies were taken to that city, Craan was able to interview many prominent French and Allied wounded officers about their experiences during the battle. On the basis of information gained in this way he published a detailed map of the battle, with an explanatory note in September 1816, under the title Plan du champ de bataille de Waterloo, avec notice historique. In the explanatory note he mentions the names of generals Mouton, Lobau, Excelmans and Gérard on the French side. He also mentions a number of high British, Dutch-Belgian and Prussian officers, though he does not give their names. Colonel François Aimé Mellinet (chief-of-staff of the Young Guard Division) advised him on the map, as did "a number of Prussian generals" to whom he was introduced by Prince Frederick of the Netherlands. The Prince of Orange, who had commanded an army corps at the battle later viewed the map and approved of it (as did the Duke of Wellington). Finally, Emperor Alexander I of Russia was so enamored of the map that he presented Craan with a precious ring.

The map and explanatory note are still relevant, because they contradict a number of "facts" that have been assumed by many historians about the battle. For instance, though in many accounts of the battle the Dutch-Belgian Bijlandt brigade is assumed to have stood in front of a ridge (and so exposed to the opening bombardment of the French artillery), Craan's map shows the brigade behind the ridge (which is commensurate with the after-battle report of the chief-of-staff of the 2nd Netherlands Division, of which the Bijlandt brigade was a part).

=== Introduction of Lithography ===
Craan is also credited with having introduced the printing technique of Lithography in Belgium in 1817. A brother of the inventor of the technique, Alois Senefelder, visited Brussels in that year. He soon left for The Hague, but left his son-in-law and together with that gentleman Craan put the new print shop on a sure footing. This helped convince the minister of Public Education, Anton Reinhard Falck, of its value. Though Craan soon shifted his attention to other subjects, this early support helped to establish the technique in Belgium.

=== City plan of Brussels and other scientific contributions ===
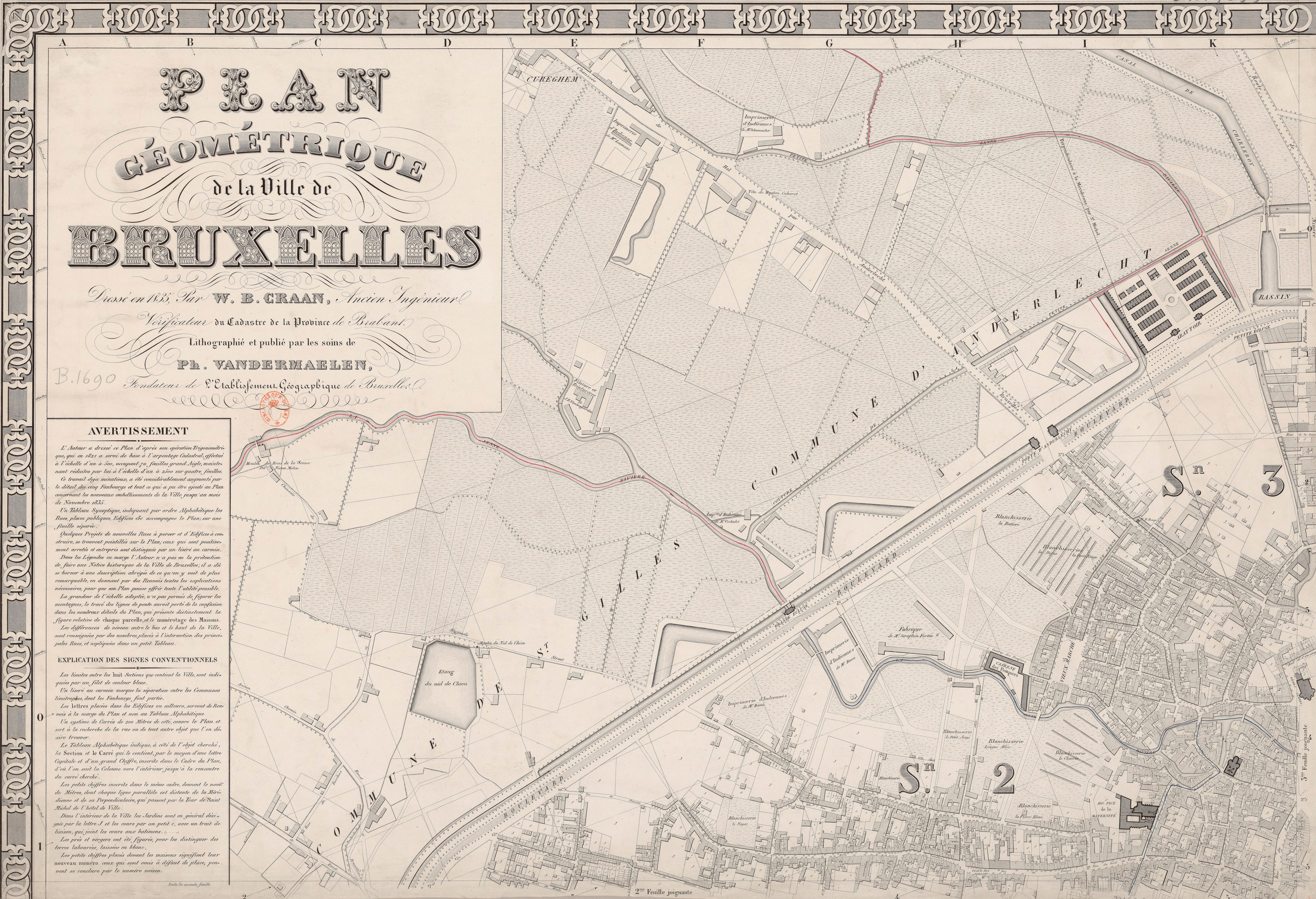
Title block of Craan's map of Brussels

In the 18th century the science of surveying made rapid advances, and many countries were completely overlaid with triangles, using the surveying method of triangulation. In the United Kingdom of the Netherlands such a survey was partially completed by general Krayenhoff, but the Belgian Revolution prevented its completion in Belgium. Craan helped to give new impetus to this effort. His main contribution was his Plan géométrique de la ville de Bruxelles avec ses faubourgs et communes limitrophes (in 4 folios, 1836). He had made the measurements for this city plan already in 1821.

Craan also helped establish the first series of meteorological measurements in Belgium by starting barometric soundings on the steeple of the Brussels city hall in 1825.

Craan died in 1848, survived by a wife and daughter: Virginie Frederique Wilhelmine Aspasia. The latter, known in Brussels as la belle hollandaise, was married to major-general Willem Frederik van Bylandt, the commander of the Bijlandt brigade at Waterloo.

== Sources ==
- (in French) "Craan (Willem Benjamin)", in: Nouvelle biographie générale depuis les temps les plus reculés jusqu'à nos jours, avec les renseignements bibliographiques et l'indication des sources á consulter. Tomes 11-12 (1856), p. 327
- (in French) Heuschling, X. (1850) "Notice biographique sur Guillaume-Benjamin Craan, auteur du plan de la bataille de Waterloo, etc.", in: Bulletin du Bibliophile belge, série 1, tome 7, pp. 73–90
