= Tanjung Barat =

Coordinates: 6.302325°S 106.850414°E

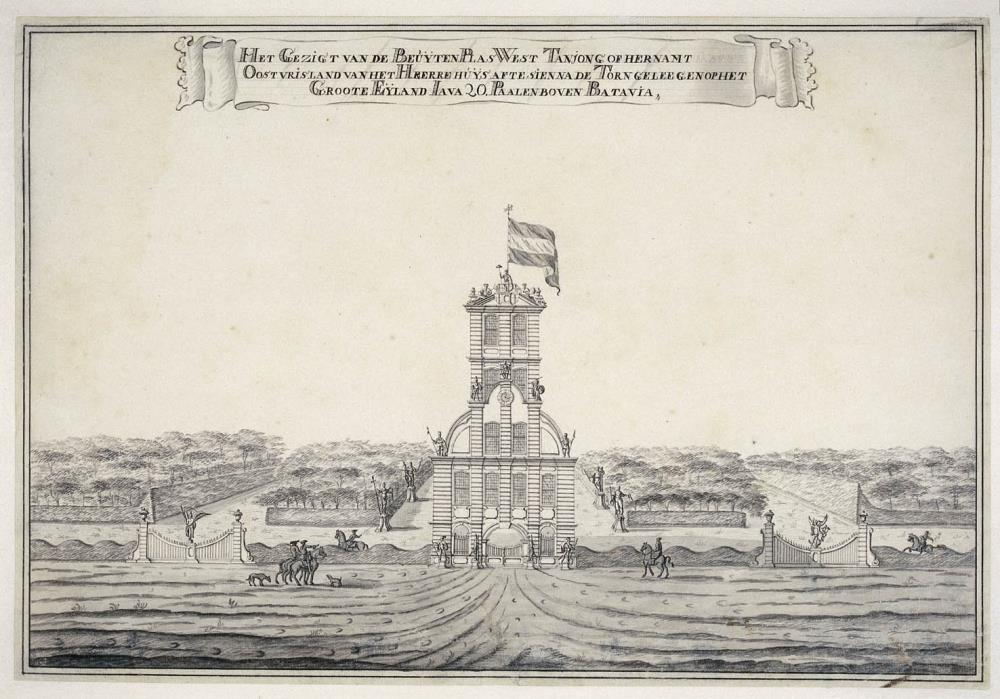
The 25 meter gate tower to the Tandjong West estate.

Tandjong West (English: "West Cape"; Indonesian: "Tanjung Barat") was a particuliere land or private domain in modern-day Tanjung Barat, Jagakarsa, South Jakarta, Indonesia. The center of the domain was the eponymous Landhuis Tandjong West, an eighteenth-century Dutch colonial manor house.

== History ==
=== 18th-century ===
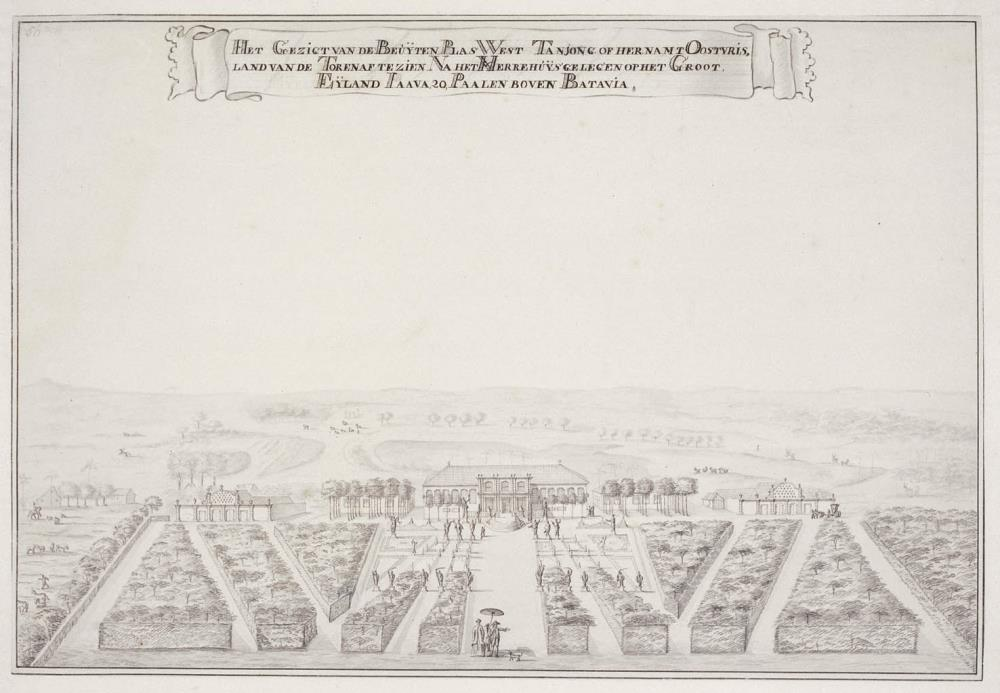
The main building of Landhuis Tandjong West, with its vast Baroque landscaping.

Tandjong West is located on the west side of the upper Ciliwung (the vast area between Jalan Poltangan Raya, Jalan Raya Pasar Minggu, Jakarta Outer Ring Road and the Ciliwung). The first recorded owner of the estate was Jan Andries Duurkoop, who bought the estate from an anonymous previous owner between 1760 and 1780. At this time, Duurkoop commissioned Johannes Rach to make a drawing of Landhuis Tandjong West. The manor house features a 25-meter high tower gate in Baroque style. The country house features a vast garden and a main building. The main building consists of a main house flanked with detached smaller wings, probably for guest houses - a typical Old Indies feature.

Duurkoop utilized the estate as a farmland, where he kept about 5 thousand cattle producing milk and meat for the company in forted Batavia. It was recorded that transport to Batavia downstream took about 6 hours, while upstream from Batavia it took around two days. At this time, the estate was nicknamed Oostvriesland, after the historic milk-producing region in northern Europe. Tandjong West was located in close proximity with another – more notable – country house, the Tandjong Oost or the Groeneveld, about 600 meter to the east of Tandjong West on the other side of the Ciliwung.

The land was noted for being unsuitable for producing crops, the reason why it was utilized for rearing livestock.

Duurkoop died in 1792 and may have been buried in the estate Tandjong West. The fate of the manor house was unclear. His wife Johanna Adriana Christina Duurkoop remarried with Conraag Johnas and moved to Japan for a military duty. The couple returned to Batavia later. Conraag died in 1803. The estate Tandjong West was inherited to the descendant of Johanna Adriana Christina in 1838.

=== 19th-century ===
In the 19th century, the government of the Dutch Indies, under Daendels, started to consolidate the private lands between Batavia and Buitenzorg. He introduced ways to optimize the land into farmlands by channeling water from the Ciliwung. In the estate of Tandjong West, a dam was established to form the Situ Babakan. From there, waters irrigate the land north of it, including Lenteng Agung and Tanjung Barat. The land became arable, and horticultural produce flourished in the area.

In 1816, Captain Quirijn Maurits Rudolph Ver Huell recorded seeing Landhuis Tandjong West from the other side of the Ciliwung while visiting the Landhuis Tandjong Oost. Ver Huell described the building as "standing across the high banks of the river, the beautiful Landhuis Tanjong-West, surrounded by a forest of coconut trees... at the foot of these heights lay a lovely green meadow, covered with numerous grazing herd of cattle, here and there a group of dark tamarind trees - in the foreground the richest nature one can imagine". His record indicates the close proximity of the Landhuis Tandjong West with the more notable Landhuis Tandjong Oost.

In 1873, the Batavia-Buitenzorg rail line was opened, shifting the main mode of transport from the river to the railway.

=== 20th-century and today ===
In the 1901 map of Lenteng Agung, the manor house as described in the notes of Ver Huell still exist, being located in close proximity to the Landhuis Tandjong Oost. The 1901 map indicates it as located in what is now the southeast end of Jalan Poltangan Raya where it meets Jalan Nangka.

In the early twentieth century, the particuliere land or private domain of Tandjong West was owned by a company, N. V. Landbouw Maatschappij Tandjong West, headed by the landlord ('landheer') Tan Liok Tiauw.

In 1932, the building with its gate tower have no longer existed, though the landscape as described by the Ver Huell remained unchanged. The land where the manor house used to stand as indicated in the 1901 map is currently owned by the government of Jakarta and used for the Pusling (mobile health center) Tanjung Barat. Today, there are no traces of Landhuis Tandjong West or the farmland.

== See also ==
- Dutch Indies country houses
- Indies Style
- List of colonial buildings and structures in Jakarta

== Cited works ==
- Batavia Topographisch Bureau (1901). Lenteng Agoeng: herzien in het jaar 1900 [Lenteng Agung in 1900] (Map). 1:20000 (in Dutch). Batavia: Batavia Topographisch Bureau. Archived from the original on 2017-11-16.
- van de Wall, V. I. (1932). Indische Landhuizen en Hun Geschiedenis [Indies Country Houses and Their History]. Batavia: Koninklijk Bataviaasch Genootschap van Kunsten en Wetenschappen bij G. Kolff & Co.
