= National Archives of Indonesia =

National Archives of the Republic of Indonesia

- Arsip Nasional Republik Indonesia
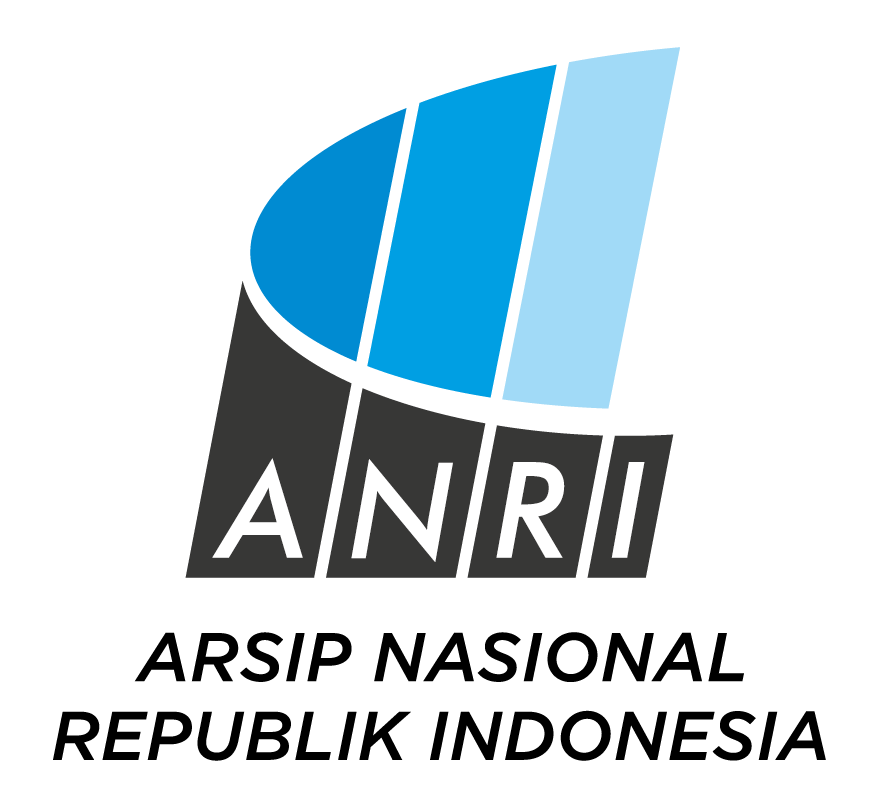
- Logo of ANRI

- New complex in South Jakarta

Agency overview
- Formed: 28 January 1892 as Landsarchief
- Preceding agencies: Kobunsjokan (1942 - 1945); Arsip Negeri (1945 - 1947); Landsarchief (1947 - 1949); Arsip Negara (1950-1959)
- Jurisdiction: Government of Indonesia
- Headquarters: South Jakarta, Jakarta; 6°16′43″S 106°49′10″E
- Annual budget: Rp 252 billion (2025)
- Agency executives: Imam Gunarto, Director General; Rini Agustiani, Secretary General
- Website: anri.go.id

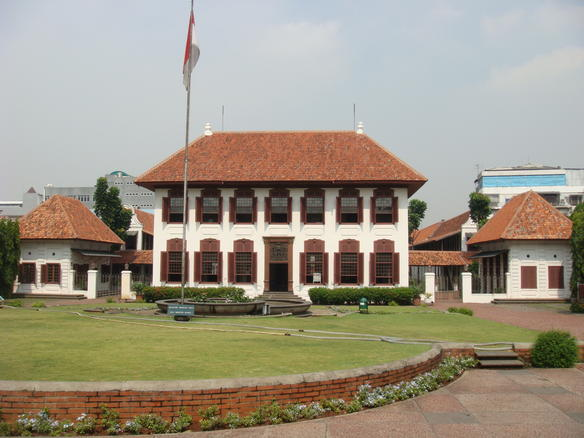
The old National Archives Building in Jalan Gajah Mada.

The National Archives of Indonesia (ANRI, Indonesian: Arsip Nasional Republik Indonesia, lit. 'National Archives of the Republic of Indonesia') is the non-departmental government institution of Indonesia responsible for maintaining a central archive. It holds the largest archive collection related to the Dutch East India Company (VOC). In 2003, Indonesia introduced a joint submission to the UNESCO Memory of the World Register with the Netherlands, South Africa, and Sri Lanka for their archival collections related to the VOC. The National Archives collection traces its origins to the work of Jacob Anne van der Chijs, who was appointed the first archivist of the Dutch East Indies in 1892 by the colonial government.

== History ==
The task of archive management in the early period of Dutch presence in Indonesia fell upon the General Secretariat of the colonial government. Archive material received little attention during this period and was often unmaintained, resulting in accumulation of material and insect damage. During the interregnum period (1811–1816) arising from Napoleonic Wars, the British took over administration of the Dutch East Indies. Archive maintenance fell upon the hands of the librarian of the Royal Batavian Society of Arts and Sciences. On 19 February 1819, the archive was returned to the management of the General Secretariat and remained within its jurisdiction until 1892.

In 1860, Jacob Anne van der Chijs and Henry David Levyssohn Norman were commissioned to investigate the existing archives. Over the next several years, 15 chests of archive material were transported to the Nationaal Archief in the Netherlands. Plans to send all material overseas were blocked by the Batavian Society, and a commission was charged in 1872 to determine which materials important enough to be kept would be transferred to the Society. Van der Chijs was recommissioned in 1880 to create the archive's first collection catalog, which was eventually published in two years later. The collection contained 18,387 items, and work began to order and number them definitively.

Van der Chijs was appointed the first archivist of the Indies on 28 January 1892 through a government decree. Although van der Chijs regarded his work as provisional, his successors did not continue the work to document the VOC archives. In 1925, the collection was moved to the former country estate of Governor-General Reynier de Klerck, where it remained undamaged during the period of Japanese occupation. When the Dutch transferred sovereignty of the Indies to Indonesia in 1949, the collections were handed to the current National Archives. They were finally moved to the new location of the National Archives in 1975.

== Collection ==
Indonesia holds the largest archive collection related to the Dutch East India Company in the world, with documents dating between 1612 and 1811. The collection encompasses almost half of the VOC archives worldwide with a total of 15,000 entries on 1,800 meters of shelf space. In 2003, a joint nomination to include the combined archives of the Dutch East India Company in the Memory of the World International Register with the Netherlands, South Africa, and Sri Lanka was submitted to and approved by UNESCO.

== See also ==
- National Library of Indonesia
- National Archives Building, Jakarta
- List of libraries in Indonesia
