= Reynier de Klerck =

Dutch colonial governor

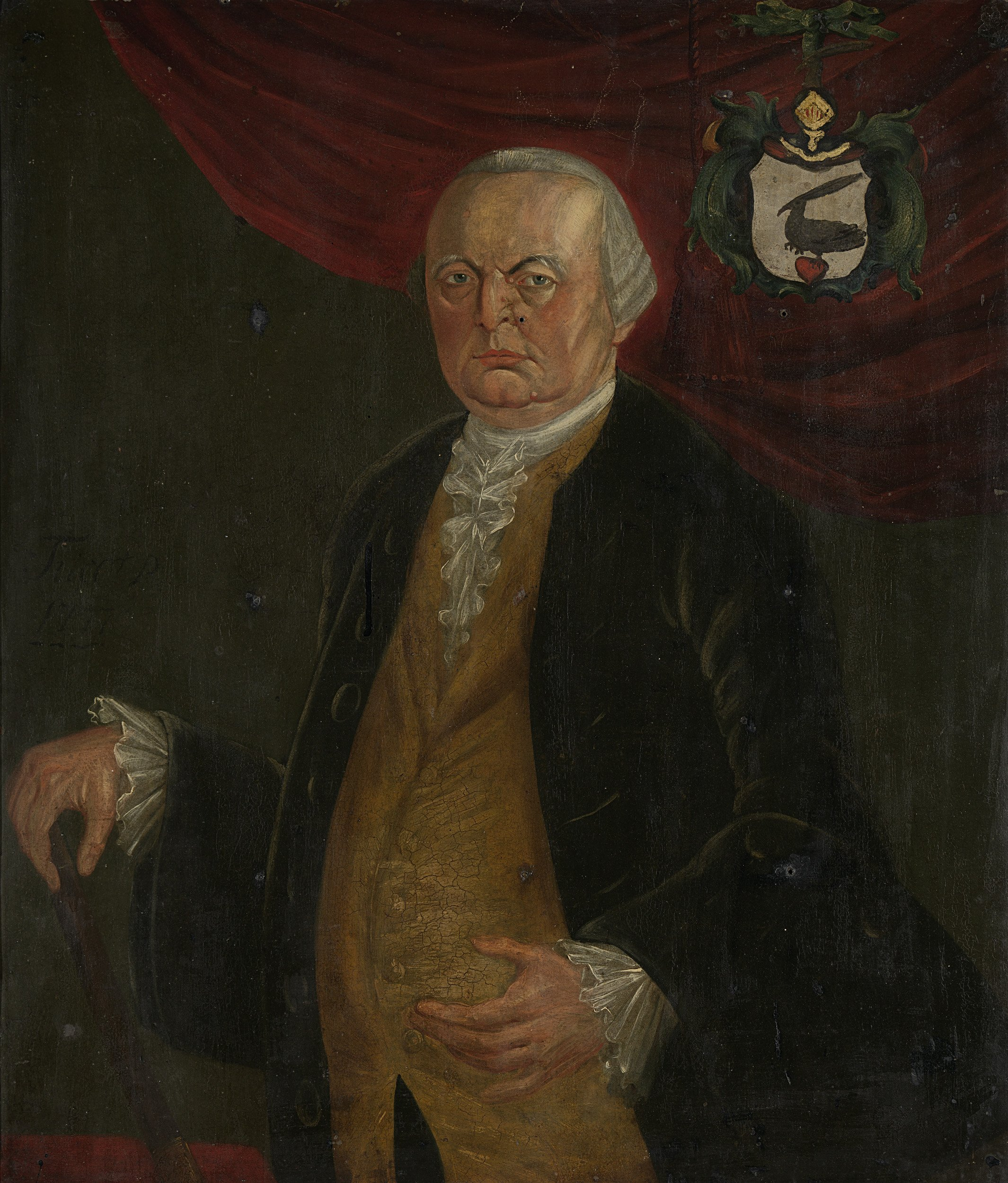
- Portrait by Josephus Fricot, 1777

Governor-General of the Dutch East Indies
- In office 4 October 1777 – 1 September 1780
- Preceded by: Jeremias van Riemsdijk
- Succeeded by: Willem Arnold Alting

Personal details
- Born: 19 November 1710 Middelburg, Dutch Republic
- Died: 1 September 1780 (aged 69) Batavia, Dutch East Indies (present‑day Indonesia)

Reynier de Klerck (or Reinier de Klerck) (baptised 19 November 1710 – 1 September 1780) was Governor-General of the Dutch East Indies from 1778 until 1780.

De Klerk's date of birth is not known but he was baptised on 19 November 1710 in Middelburg. He worked as midshipman aboard the Kamer van Zeeland, a warship, whose duty was to protect the routes of homeward bound cargo ships. He made two trips to India as a sailor in the service of the Dutch East India Company. In December 1730, he left permanently for India aboard the 't Vliegend Hert.

Between 1735 and 1737 he was the pilot aboard a small ship which traded to-and-fro Batavia and Padang. In 1737 he became an accountant (boekhouder) with the Dutch East India Company, and so began for him a life on land. In 1738, he was onderkoopman and resident (underbuyer/undermerchant and resident) in Lampung. In 1741 he was a secretary with the army on Java. In 1742 he became Chief in Surabaya and in 1744 koopmand en eerste administrateur (buyer/merchant and first administrator) in Semarang. In 1747, he was named opperkoopmand en tweede bestuurder (upperbuyer/uppermerchant and second in charge) of Java's Northeast Coast. In 1748 he became Governor and Director of Banda. He moved to Batavia (now Jakarta) in 1754 when he was made president of the College van Boedelmeesteren der Chinesche en andere onchristelijke sterfhuizen (which looked after Chinese and other non-Christian burial facilities) for Batavia. In October 1754, Reynier de Klerck was installed as Counsellor-extraordinary of the Indies, and in 1762 was appointed as Counsellor in the Dutch Council of the Indies. In 1775 he became acting Director-General, being named actual Director-General in 1776.

On 4 October 1777, the day after the death of Governor-General Jeremias van Riemsdijk, he was unanimously chosen as Governor-General. He took up the official functions of the post one year later, 9 October 1778. Reynier de Klerck was a hardworking governor. He was a powerful reformer, who however could not realise all his ideas. He was very committed to bringing Dutch culture to the Indies. Thus he wanted to replace Portuguese and Malay with Dutch in the education system. His endeavours failed however because the local population did not want this. During his term of office, few important happenings occurred. A conflict in the Celebes was brought to an end by occupying Gowa, while the Sultan of Bantam Landak and Batjan gave way to the Dutch East India Company. To preserve the spice monopoly, the Princes of Tidore and Batjan were deposed and sent into exile to Batavia. They were replaced by puppets of the Company.

The term of office of van Reynier de Klerck did not last long, for he died on 1 September 1780 in Molenvliet near Batavia. He was followed as governor by Willem Arnold Alting.

Reynier de Klerck's house in Batavia can still be seen, as the National Archives Museum on Jalan Gajah Mada, Jakarta.

== Sources ==
- Site in Dutch on the Dutch East India Company (VOC)
- Encyclopaedie van Nederlandsch-Indië, part H–M
- Putten, L. P. van, 2002, Ambitie en onvermogen: gouverneurs-generaal van Nederlands-Indië 1610–1796.
