= Pieter Adriaan Jacobus Moojen =

Dutch painter

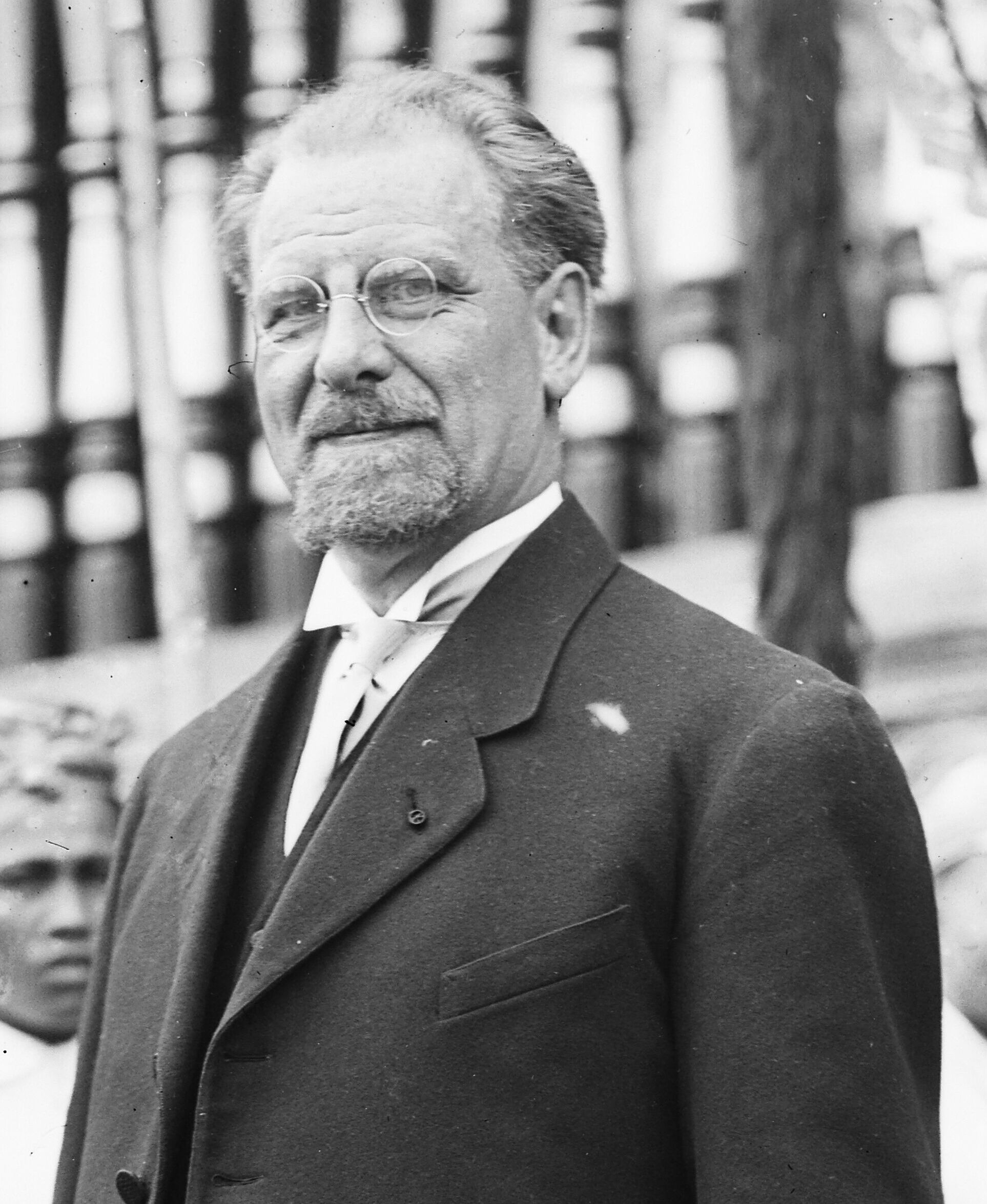
- Born: June 26, 1879; Kloetinge
- Died: April 1, 1955 (aged 75); Ede
- Occupation: Architect
- Buildings: Cirebon Station; Cut Mutiah Mosque; Kunstkring Art Gallery

Pieter Adriaan Jacobus "Piet" Moojen (26 June 1879 - 1 April 1955) was a Netherlands-Indies architect, painter and writer. He studied architecture and painting in Antwerp. He lived and worked in the Dutch East Indies from 1903 to 1929. He was one of the first architects to implement Modernism in the Dutch East Indies. Moojen became widely known for his work on the Dutch entry at the Paris Colonial Exposition in 1931. He was active as an architect between 1909 and 1931.

As a member of the Commisie van Toesicht op het beheer van het land Menteng, Moojen was influential in designing the town planning for Batavia's Nieuwe Gondangdia Garden City (now Menteng). He established the Kunstkring for both Bandung (1904) and Batavia. As a painter, he was a member of the Bataviasche Kunstkring and actively participated in exhibitions. Many of his paintings were kept in Amsterdam's Tropenmuseum.

Moojen was interested in Indonesian culture, especially the ancient monuments. His Kunst op Bali (1926) outlined the ancient Balinese architecture.

Moojen was the pioneer of a new building style in the Dutch East Indies. In 1912, civil engineer C.E.J. van der Meyl underscored Moojen's importance to the emergence of Modernism in the Dutch East Indies. Berlage made similar comment in his Mijn Indische reis (Rotterdam 1931). He reasons that in designing the Batavia's NILLMIJ office and Kunstkring Art Gallery, Moojen replaced the customary Classicist forms with "the realization of a more rational concept", an international architectural movement known as Rationalism, which was later dubbed as New Indies Style to refer this movement in the Dutch East Indies where it was slightly conformed to suit the local climate.

== Works ==
=== Architecture and interior ===
- Cut Mutiah Mosque, Jakarta
- Cirebon Station, Cirebon
- Hotel der Nederlanden's dining hall, Jakarta (1906)
- Kunstkring Art Gallery, Bandung
- Kunstkring Art Gallery, Jakarta (1914)
- Batavia office of Dutch East Indies Life Insurance and Annuity Company (Nederlandsch-Indische Levensverzekerings en Lijfrente Maatschappij or NILLMIJ) (now head office of Asuransi Jiwasraya)
- Bali Museum, Denpasar, Bali (1931)
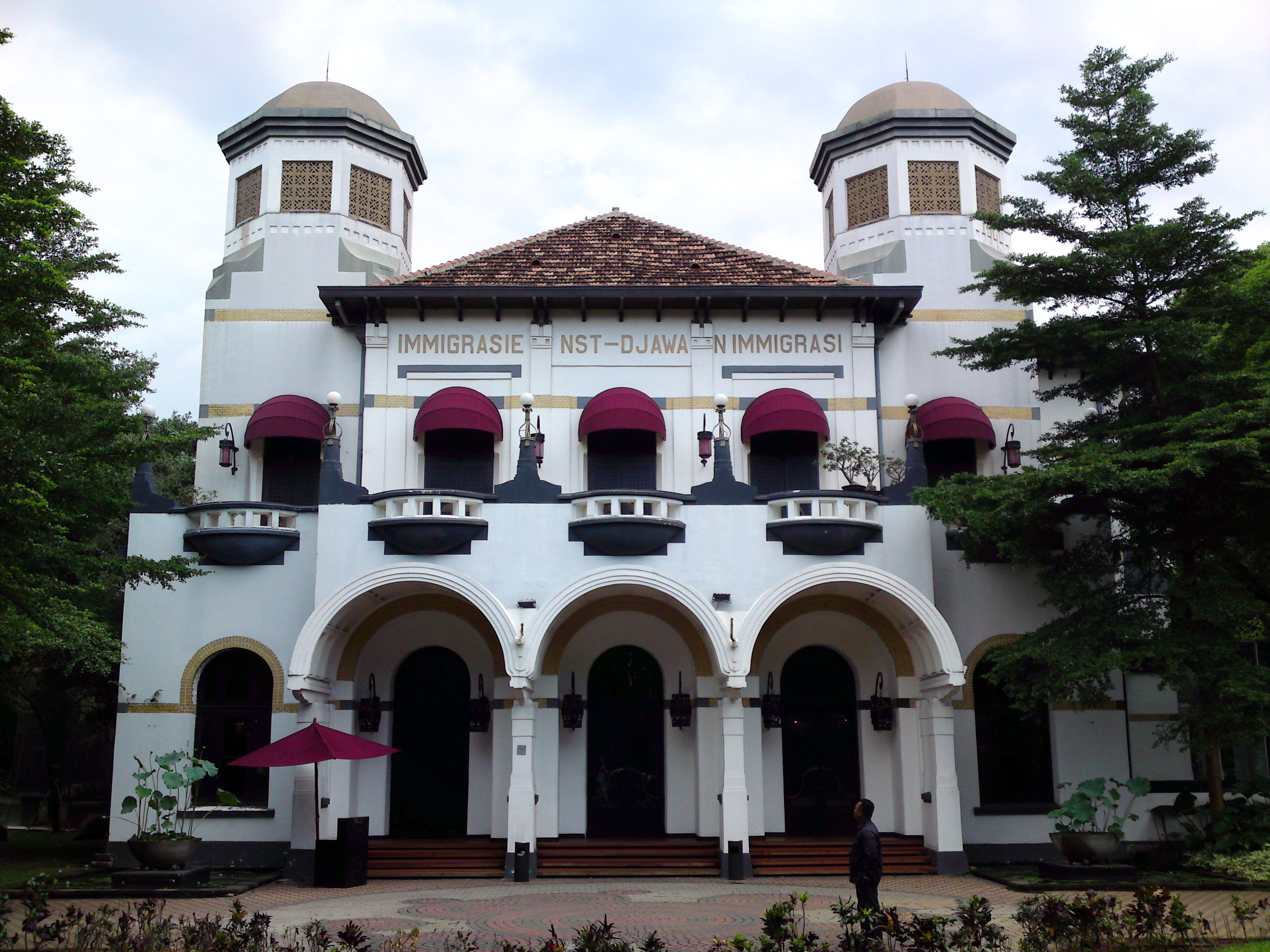
Kunstkring Art Gallery, built in 1914.

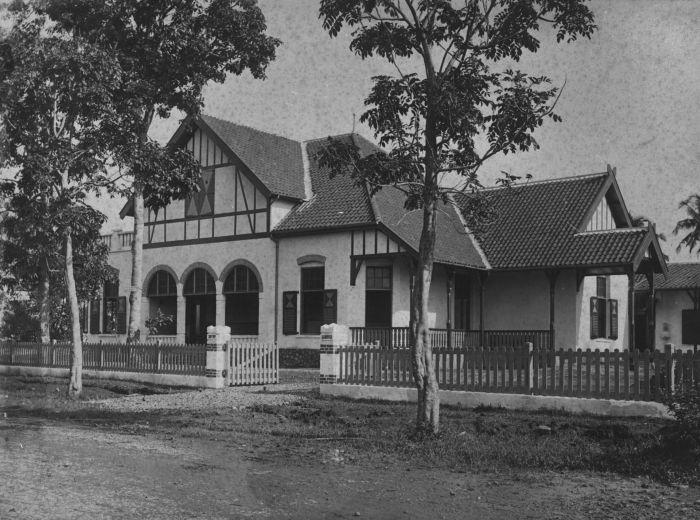
A villa in Bandung built by the architecture firm Biezeveld & Moojen

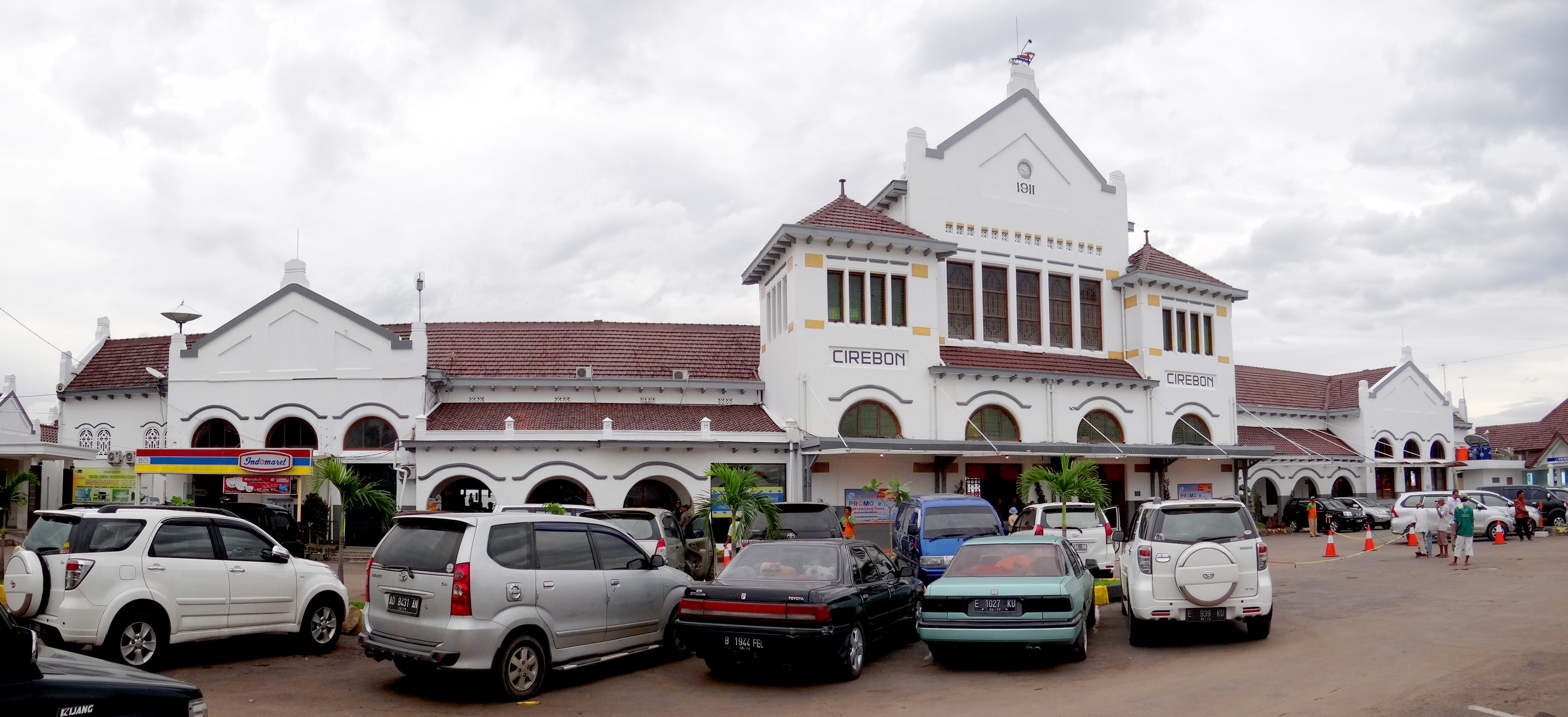
Cirebon Kejaksan Station

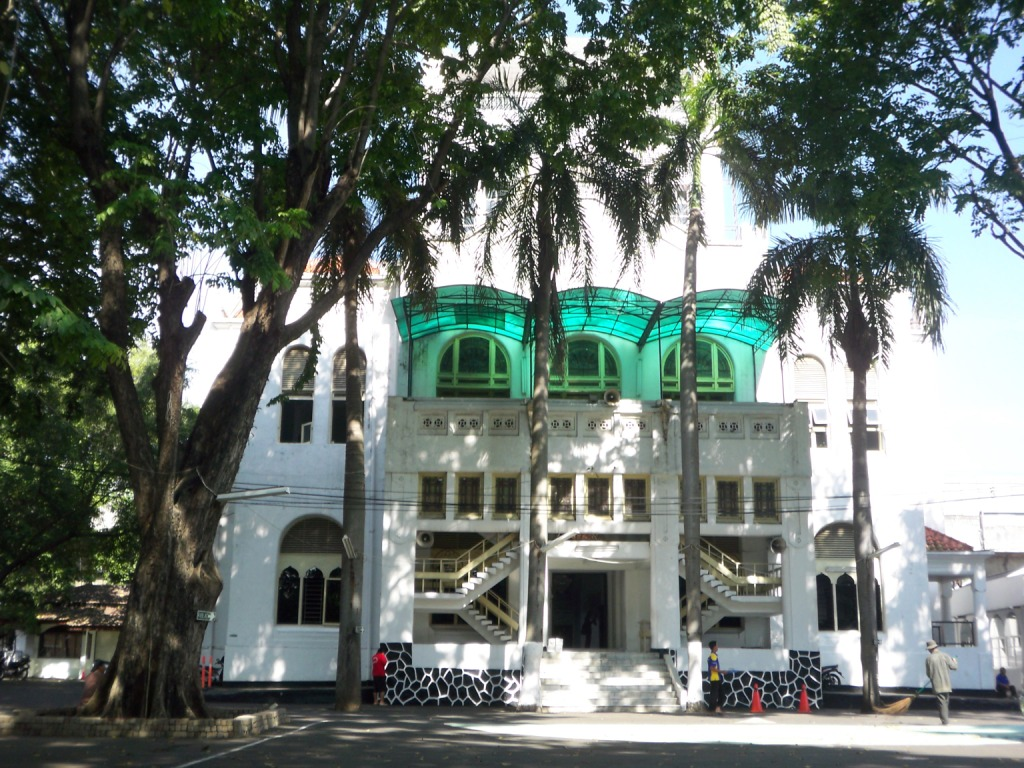
Cut Mutiah Mosque, formerly an office building.

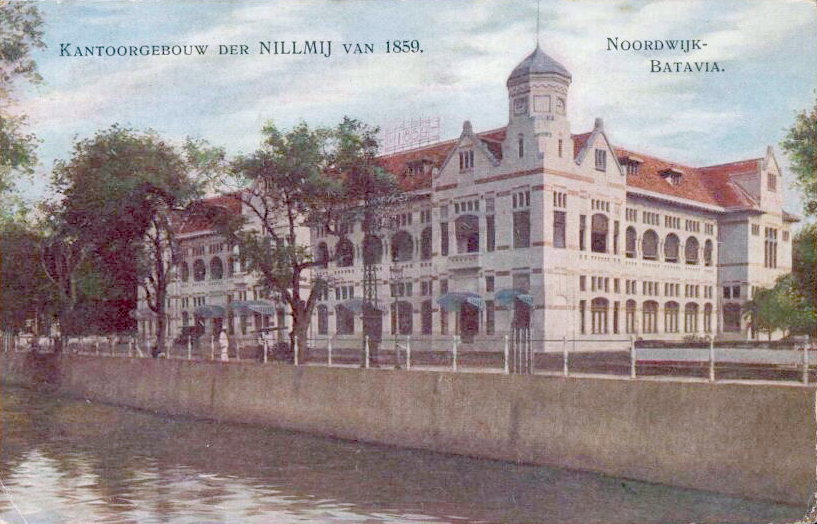
Office of Nillmij (Nederlandsch-Indische Levensverzekerings en Lijfrente Maatschappij) in Jakarta, now head office of Asuransi Jiwasraya.

=== Painting ===
- Een prinselijke Javaanse danser (1923)
- Een markt op Bali (unknown year)

=== Book ===
- Kunst op Bali: inleidende studie tot de bouwkunst (1926)

== See also ==
- Colonial architecture of Indonesia
- List of colonial buildings and structures in Jakarta
- New Indies Style
