= Swivel gun =

Small cannon mounted on swivel for ease in aiming

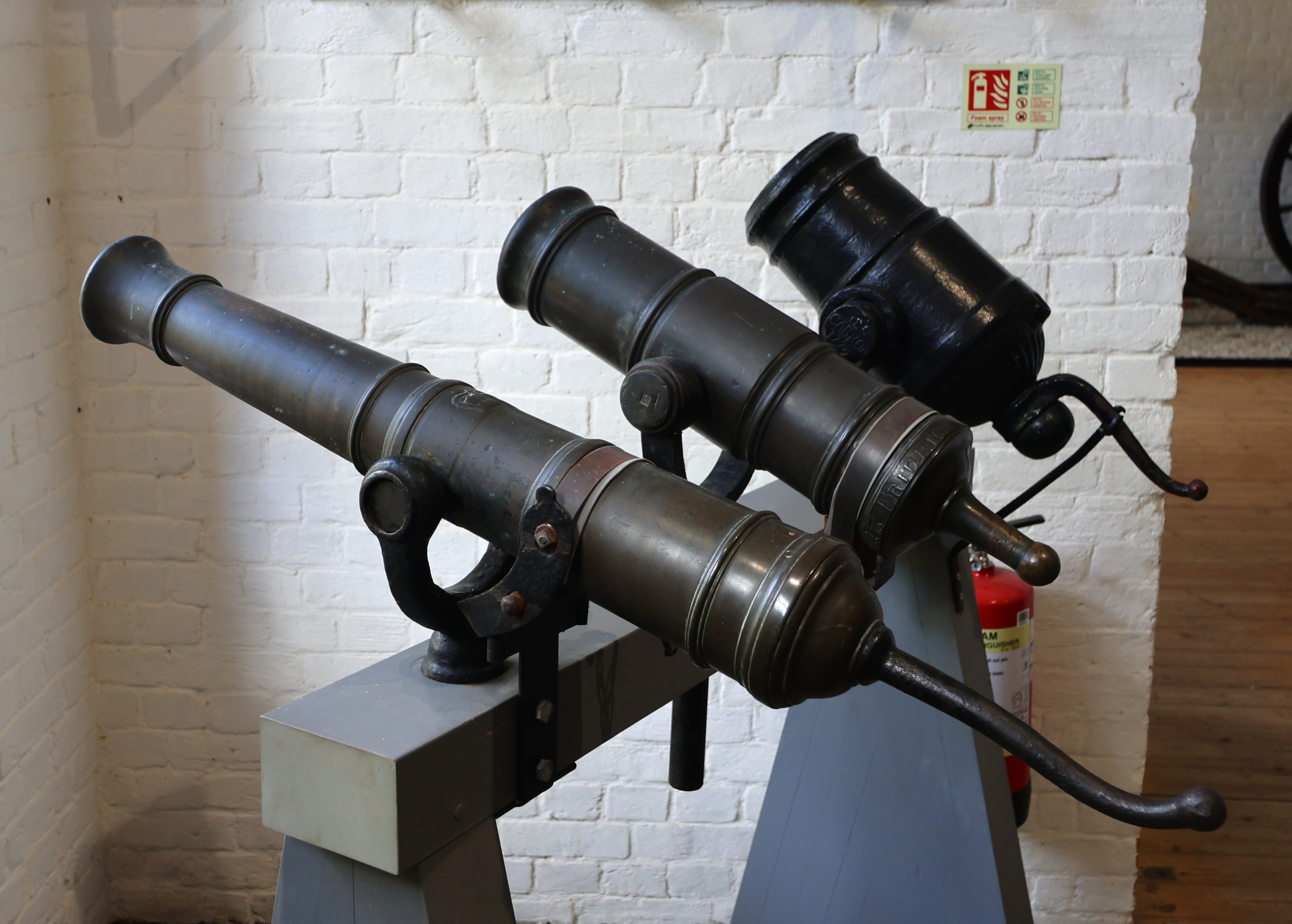
Three examples of 18th-century swivel guns

A swivel gun (or simply swivel) is a small cannon mounted on a swiveling stand or fork which allows a very wide arc of movement. Another type of firearm referred to as a swivel gun was an early flintlock combination gun with two barrels that rotated along their axes to allow the shooter to switch between either the rifled or the smoothbore barrels.

Swivel guns are distinct from pivot guns, which were far larger weapons mounted on a horizontal pivot, or screw guns, which are mountain guns with a segmented barrel.

An older term for the type is peterero (alternative spellings include "paterero" and "pederero"), derived from the Spanish name for the gun, pedrero, from piedra (stone) and the suffix -ero (-er), because it originally fired stone projectiles.

The swivel gun had a high rate of fire, as several chambers could be prepared in advance and quickly fired in succession, and was especially effective in anti-personnel roles. It was used for centuries in Europe, Asia and Africa.

== History ==
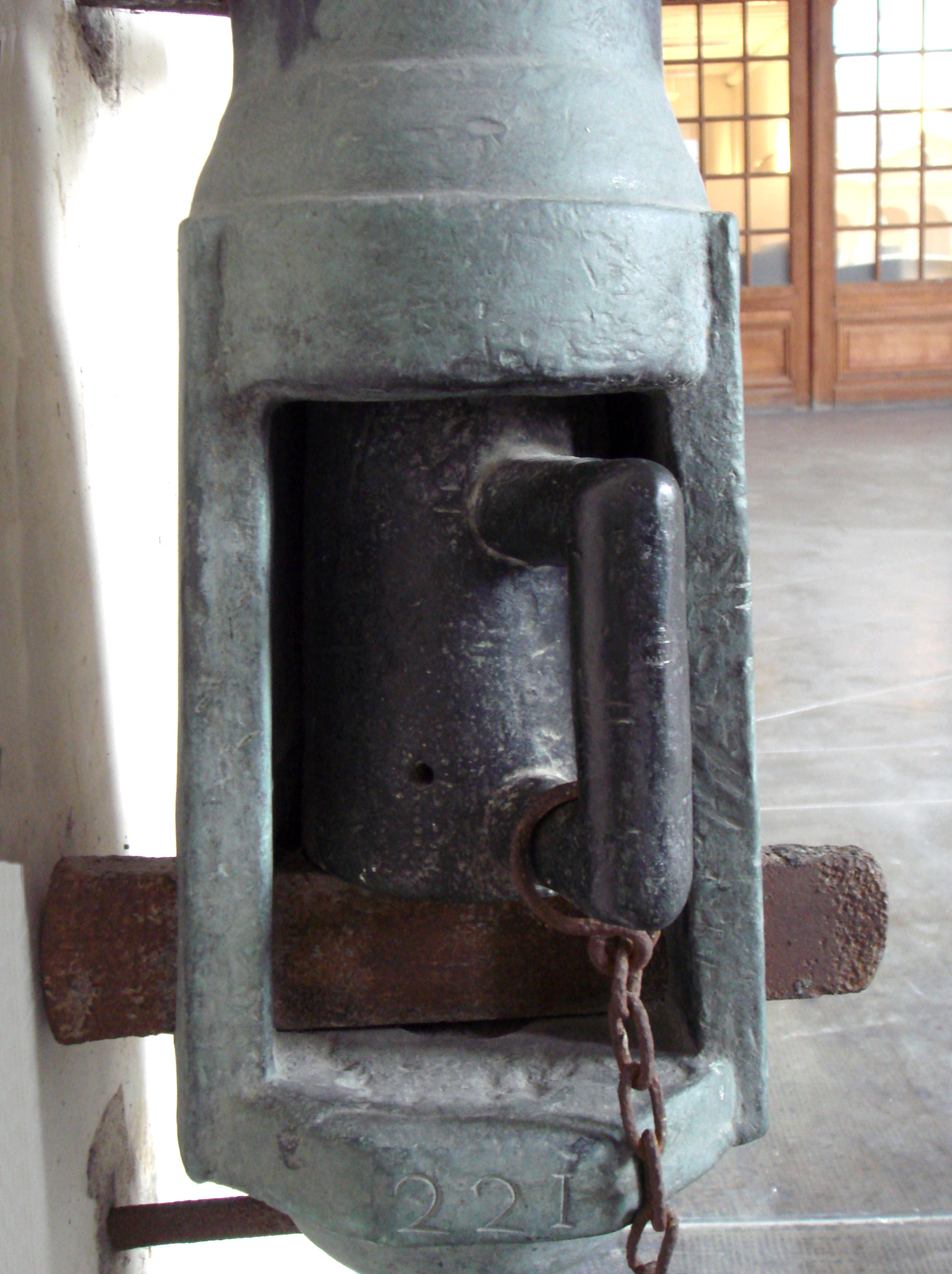
Breech-loading swivel gun with mug-shaped chamber, and wedge to hold it in place.

Although breech-loading is often considered a modern innovation which facilitated the loading of cannons, breech-loading swivel guns were invented in the 14th century, and used worldwide from the 16th century onward by numerous countries, many of them non-European. They have been called by many names, sometimes "Murderer", "Base", "Sling", "Port-Piece", "Serpentine", "Culverin", "Pierrier", "Stock Fowler", and "Patterero" in English; "Pierrier à boîte" in French; "Berço" in Portuguese; "Verso" in Spanish; "Prangi" in Turkish; "Kammerschlange" (lit. "chamber snake", properly means "breech-loading falconet") in German; "Folangji" (佛郎机, from Turkish "Prangi" or Turkic "Farangi"), "Folangji chong" (佛郎机铳, Prangi or Farangi gun), "Fo-lang-chi p'ao" (佛朗机炮 or 佛朗機砲, Portuguese cannon) in Chinese; "Bulang-kipo" ("불랑기포[佛郞機砲]") in Korean; "Furanki" (仏郎機砲, "Frankish gun") or 子砲 ("Child cannon") in Japanese; and "Bedil" or "bḍil" (ꦧꦣꦶꦭ) in Javanese. Some of them were used until the 20th century.

Swivel guns were developed and used from 1364 onward. The guns were loaded with mug-shaped chambers, in which gunpowder and projectile had been filled in advance. The chamber was then put in place, blocked with a wedge, and then fired. As the loading was made in advance and separately, breech-loading swivel guns were quick-firing guns for their time. An early description of a swivel gun puts the weight of the gun at 118 kilograms (260 lb), equipped with three chambers for rotations, each 18 kilograms (40 lb) in weight, and firing a 280 grams (9.9 oz) lead shot. The guns had the disadvantage of leaking gas around the chambers thus losing power, but achieved a high rate of fire as multiple chambers could be prepared in advance. A swivel gun could fire either cannonballs against obstacles, or grapeshot against personnel.

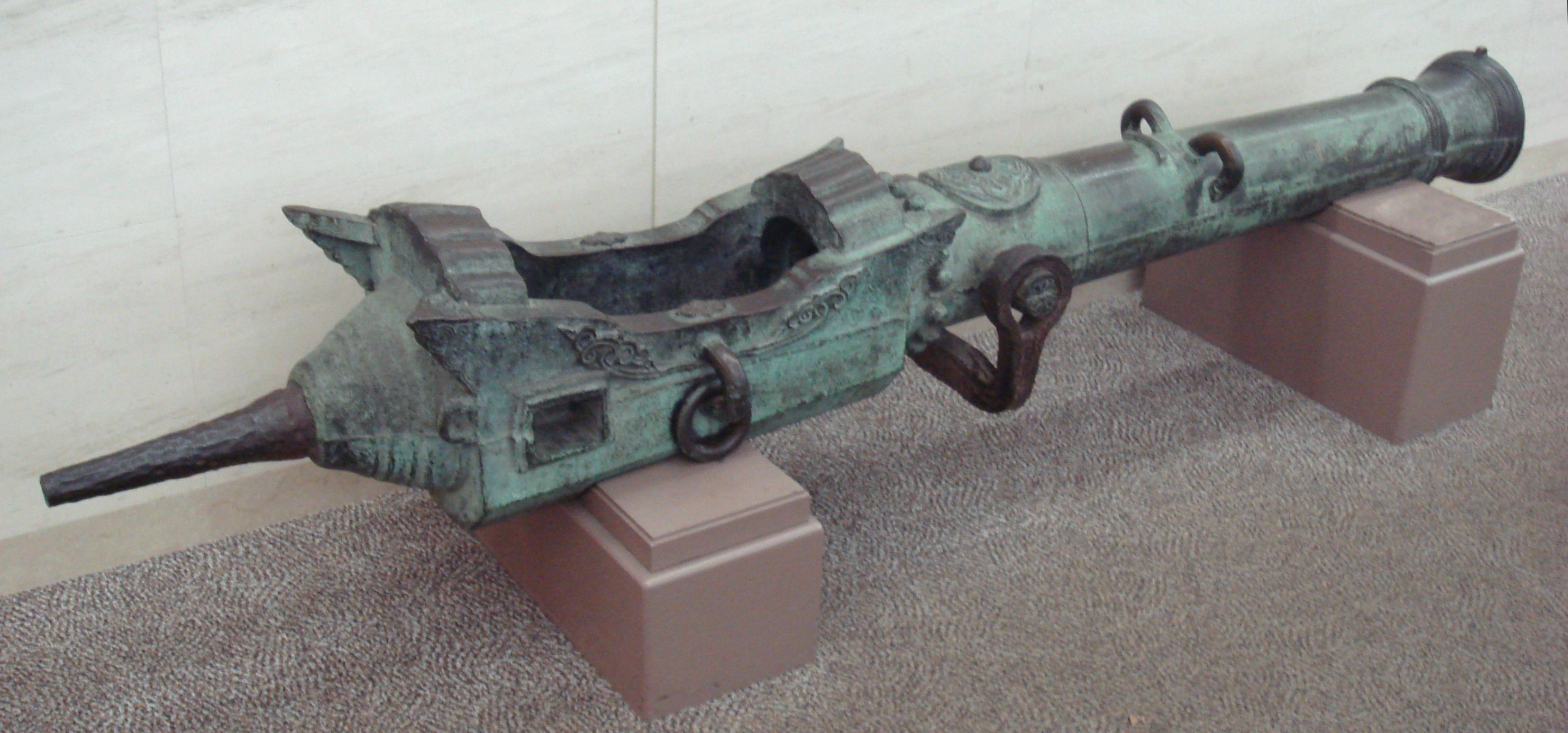
A Japanese breech-loading swivel gun of the time of the 16th century, obtained by Ōtomo Sōrin. This gun is thought to have been cast in Goa, Portuguese India. Caliber: 95 mm (3.7 in), length: 2.88 m (9.4 ft).

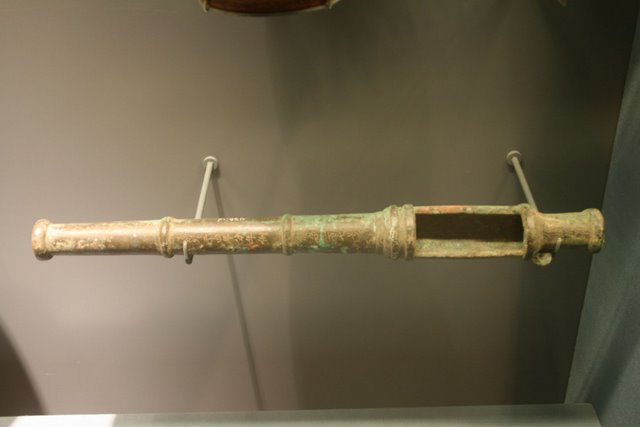
A Ming bronze cannon with open breech.

During the Middle Ages muzzle-loading cannon were often cast from bronze, which was many times more expensive than iron. Casting of iron was not yet possible, so Europeans used wrought iron bars hammered together and held with hoops like barrels to make cannon. This did not produce a one-piece cannon as was possible with casting, so a structure with separated chamber and barrel was used. This allowed the development of breech-loading swivel guns, partly as a cheaper alternative to casting bronze cannon.

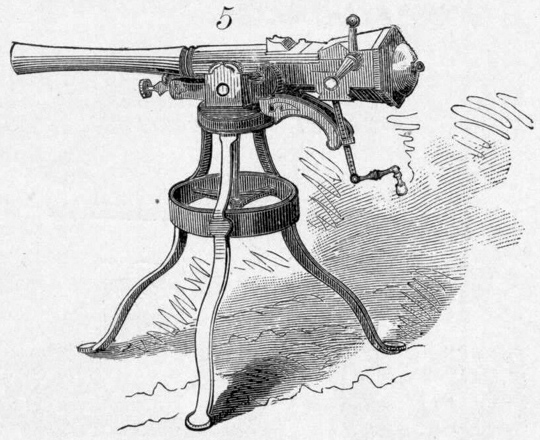
Breech-loading swivel cannon, left by Gustavus Adolphus at Munich, 1632.

Around 1500, Europeans learnt how to cast iron, and shifted their cannon productions to one-piece iron muzzleloaders. China started to adopt European swivel guns from 1500 onward, limiting at the same time the production of their own muzzleloaders, because of the high effectiveness of the swivel gun as an anti-personnel gun, which to them was more interesting than the sheer power of a cannonball.

Usage of breech-loading swivel guns continued in Europe however, with, as early as the 17th century, characteristics very similar to the modern machine-gun or mitrailleuse.

== Use ==
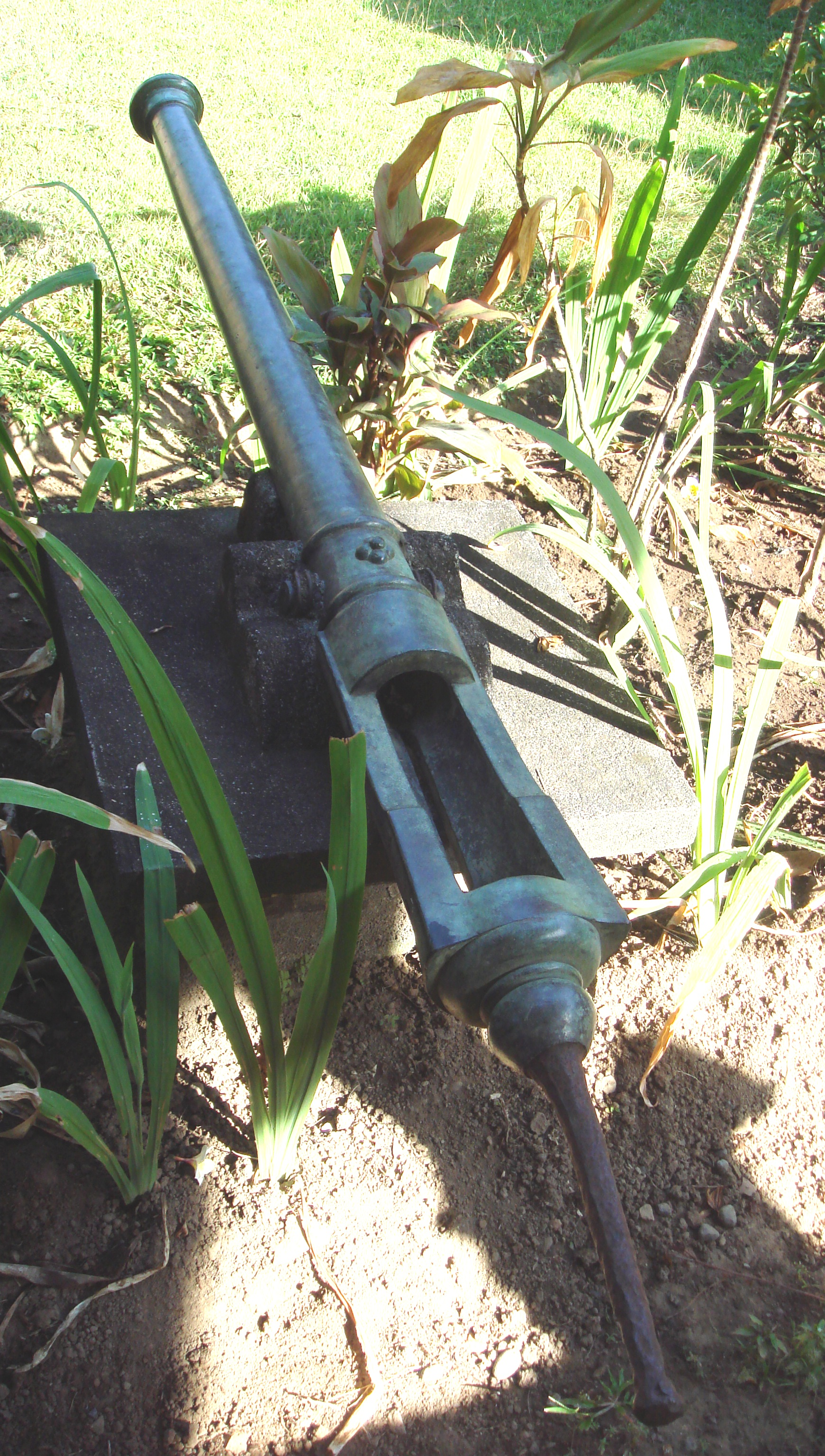
Bali Museum breech-loading swivel gun (Cetbang). Length: 1833 mm. Bore: 43 mm. Length of tiller: 315 mm. Widest part: 190 mm (at the base ring).

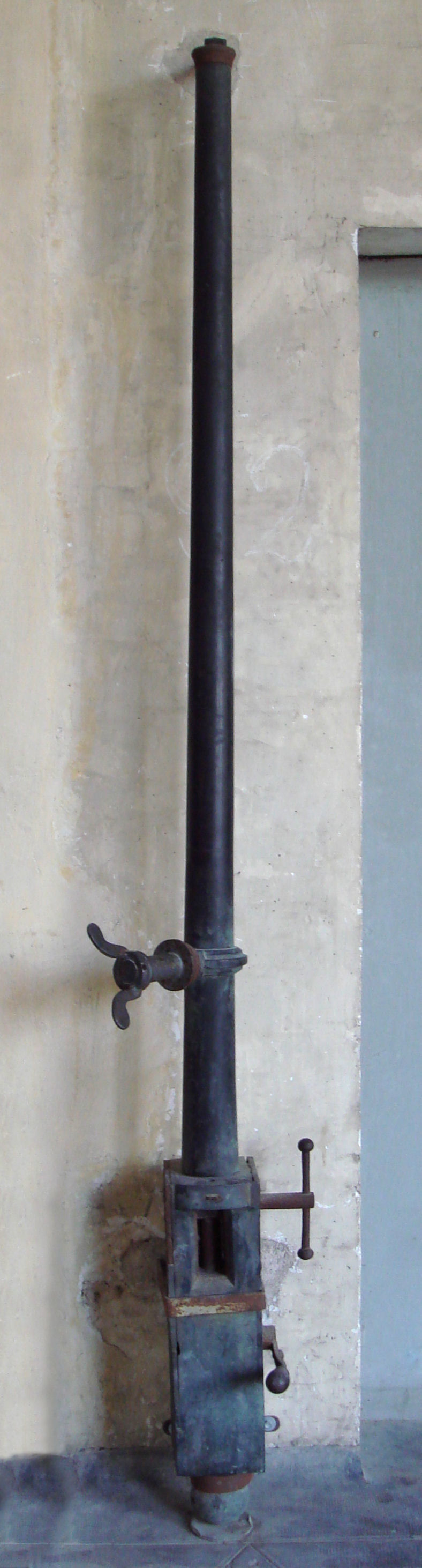
United States 30 mm 1890 steel rifled breech-loading swivel gun, brought from Madagascar to France in 1898. Length 230 cm.

Breech-loading swivel guns were used to advantage at the bow and stern on warships, but were also used in fortifications.

Breech-loading guns were used by Burgundians as early as 1364. The Portuguese had versos (Berços) in c. 1410, while England has a picture of port-pieces of 1417, although the picture itself was made c. 1485. The Ottomans used the prangi from the mid-15th century onwards in field battles, aboard their ships, and in their forts, where prangis often comprised the majority of the ordnance. These weapons spread eastward to the Indian ocean, eventually reaching Southeast Asia in c. 1460 AD.

In China and Japan, breech-loading swivel guns were adopted after China defeated the Portuguese in the 16th century. At the Battle of Xicaowan in 1522, after defeating the Portuguese in battle, the Chinese reverse-engineered captured Portuguese breech-loading swivel guns, calling them "Folangji" or "Fo-lang-chi" (佛郎機 – Frankish) guns, since the Portuguese were called "Folangji" by the Chinese. A shipwreck in 1523 apparently brought the gun to China, but the transmission may have occurred earlier. Views diverge on whether the origin of the cannon is Portuguese or Turkish. There was a confusion whether folangji was supposed to be the name of a people (the Portuguese) or name of a weapon. In fact the word folangji represent 2 different words with different etymology. The term folangji as a weapon is related to the prangi carried in Ottoman galleys and farangi used by Babur. The word folangji as an ethnonym (Frankish or Portuguese) is unrelated. The Ottoman prangi guns may have reached Indian ocean before either Ottoman or Portuguese ships did. They may also reach China through the Silk Road. In the History of the reign of Wan Li (萬厲野獲編), by Shen Defu, it is said that "After the reign of Hong Zhi (1445–1505), China started having Fu-Lang-Ji cannons, the country of which was called in the old times Sam Fu Qi". In volume 30 about "The Red-Haired Foreigners" he wrote "After the reign of Zhengtong (1436–1449) China got hold of Fu-Lang-Ji cannons, the most important magic instrument of foreign people". He mentioned the cannons some 60 or 70 years prior to the first reference about Portuguese. It was impossible for the Chinese to get hold of the Portuguese cannons prior to their arrival. Pelliot viewed that the folangji gun reached China before Portuguese did, possibly by anonymous carriers from Malaya. Needham noted that breech-loading guns were already familiar in Southern China in 1510, as a rebellion in Huang Kuan was destroyed by more than 100 folangji. It may even be earlier, brought to Fujian by a man named Wei Sheng and used in quelling a pirate incident in 1507.

In Japan, Ōtomo Sōrin seems to have been the first recipient of the guns, possibly as early as 1551. In 1561 the Portuguese, allied with Otomo in the Siege of Moji, bombarded Japanese position, possibly with swivel guns. In the Battle of Takajō in 1587, Ōtomo Sōrin used two swivel guns obtained from the Portuguese. The guns were nicknamed Kunikuzushi (国崩し, "Destroyer of Provinces").

In the later portions of the Ming dynasty (mid 16th century onward) it appears that these types of guns were the most common and numerous type of artillery used by the Ming forces. A great many variants of such cannons were produced, and we used in nearly all of the conflicts of this time, including the Imjin War. Until the introduction of heavy Dutch cannons in the early 17th century, there were even attempts by the Ming to make large, heavy versions of such guns.

Other countries also used swivel guns. In Bali, such a gun was found in the possession of the Raja of Badung, and is now in the Bali Museum. Many such guns were also used in Northern Africa by Algerian rebels in their resistance to French forces.

Breech-loading swivel guns were also used extensively in Southeast Asia as early as the 16th century, apparently even before the arrival of the Portuguese and Spanish there, and continued to be in use as a preferred anti-personnel weapon as late as the 20th century. The Americans fought Moros equipped with breech-loading swivel guns in the Philippines in 1904. In the early 20th century, Chinese junks were armed with old-fashioned swivel guns, both muzzle-and breech-loading. The breech-loading guns were called "breech loading culverin" by Cardwell; they were 8 feet (2.4 m) long with 1–2 inches (2.54–5.08 cm) bore. These guns were fired using a percussion cap mechanism. Dyer c. 1930 noted the use of cannon by Makassan trepanger in Northern Australia, in particular the bronze breechloader with 2 inches (5.08 cm) bore.

Steel rifled breech-loading swivel guns are known which were manufactured by the United States towards the end of the 19th century, and used in colonial theaters such as in Madagascar.

== Configuration ==
Swivel guns are among the smallest types of cannon, typically measuring less than 1 m (3.3 ft) long and with a bore diameter of up to 3.8 cm (1 1/2 in). They can fire a variety of ammunition but were generally used to fire grapeshot and small caliber round shot. They were aimed using a wooden or metal handle similar to a broom handle, attached to the breech of the weapon.

Most swivel guns were muzzleloaders, but there were some breech-loading swivel guns as early as 1410, making them among the first such examples of this type of weapon (see berços). Breech-loading swivel guns had a breech shaped like a beer mug with a handle; it was completely removed from the gun to load it with gunpowder and projectiles, then reinserted with its opening facing forwards. If a number of breeches were prepared by loading them beforehand, the gunner could maintain a high rate of fire for a brief period by using each of the loaded breeches in turn, rather than pausing after every shot to refill the same one.

== Applications ==
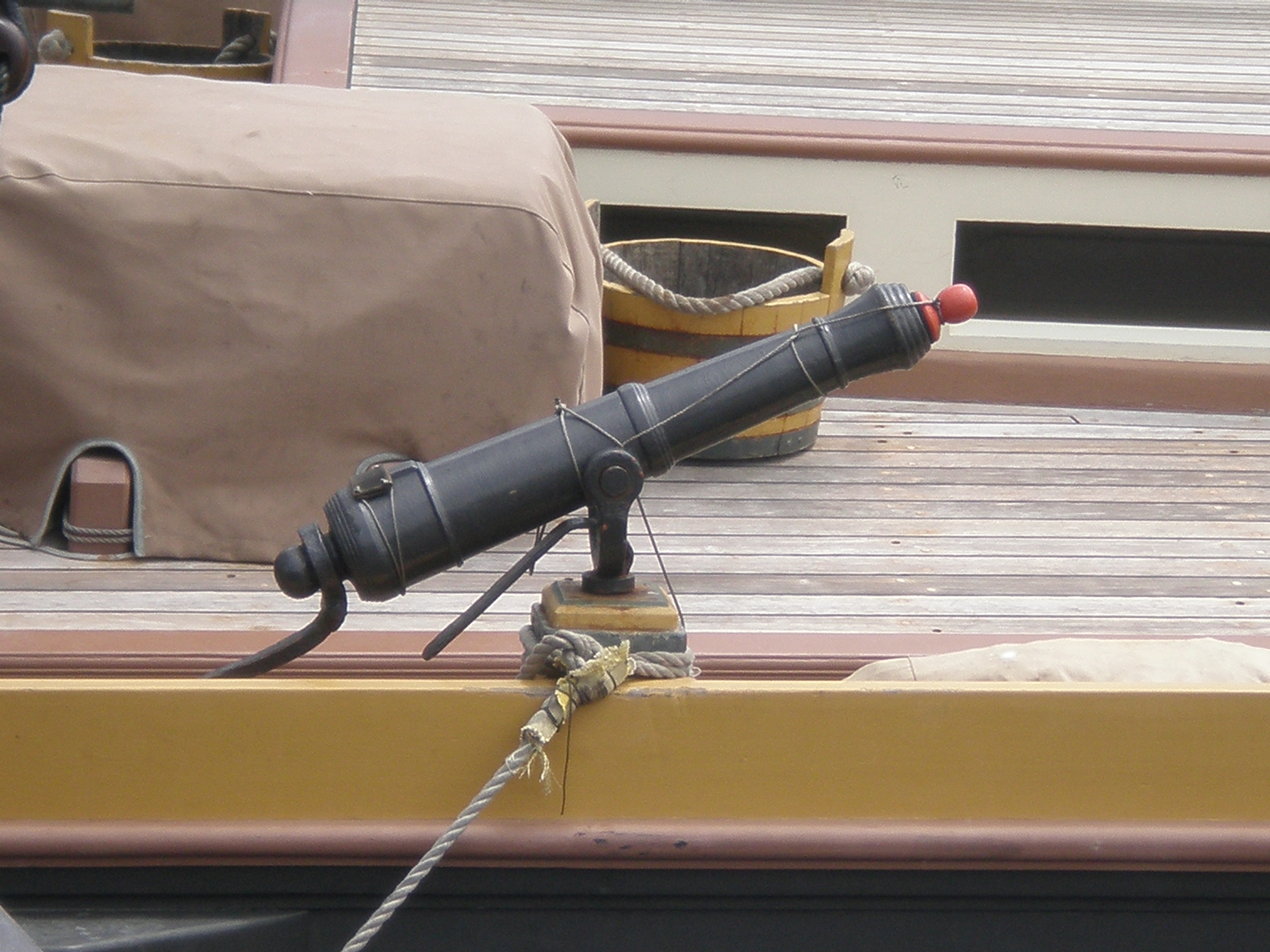
A swivel gun mounted on the American topsail schooner Lynx

Swivel guns were used principally aboard sailing ships, serving as short-range anti-personnel ordnance. They were not ship-sinking weapons, due to their small caliber and short range, but could do considerable damage to anyone caught in their line of fire. They were especially useful against deck-to-deck boarders, against approaching longboats bearing boarding parties, and against deck gun crews when ships were hull to hull.

Due to their relatively small size, swivel guns were highly portable and could be moved around the deck of a ship quite easily (and certainly much more easily than other types of cannon). They could be mounted on vertical timbers (pillars) which were either part of the ship's structure or were firmly bolted to that structure along either side, which provided the gunner with a reasonably steady platform from which to fire. Their portability enabled them to be installed wherever they were most needed; whereas larger cannon were useless if they were on the wrong side of the ship, swivel guns could be carried across the deck to face the enemy.

The small size of swivel guns enabled them to be used by a wide variety of vessels, including those too small to accommodate larger cannons, and also permitted their use on land; they were commonly issued to forts in North America in the 18th century, and Lewis and Clark took one with them on their famous expedition into the American interior in 1804. Swivel guns also had peaceful uses. They were used for signalling purposes and for firing salutes, and also found uses in whaling, where bow-mounted swivel guns were used to fire harpoons, and fowling, where swivel guns mounted on punts were used to shoot flocks of waterfowl (see also punt gun).

Swivel guns were extensively used by the kingdoms and empires of Asia, particularly Ottoman, China, Korea, and Nusantara. The Ottomans used the prangi from the mid-15th century onwards in field battles, aboard their ships, and in their forts, where prangis often comprised the majority of the ordnance. These weapons would spread eastward to Indian ocean, eventually reaching Southeast Asia in c. 1460 AD.

The Chinese knew breech-loading swivel guns since at least 1507, when it was brought to Fujian by a man named Wei Sheng and used in quelling a pirate incident in 1507. Needham noted that breech-loading guns were already familiar in Southern China in 1510, as a rebellion in Huang Kuan was destroyed by more than 100 folangji. Korea followed suit by the 1560s. During the Japanese invasions of Korea (1592–1598), Korean naval forces used swivel guns and larger cannon to great effect in interdicting the invading Japanese forces.

== See also ==
- List of firearms before the 20th century
- Wall piece
- Zamburak
- Lela and lantaka, Malay swivel gun
