= Kunstkring Art Gallery =

- Galeri Seni Kunstkring
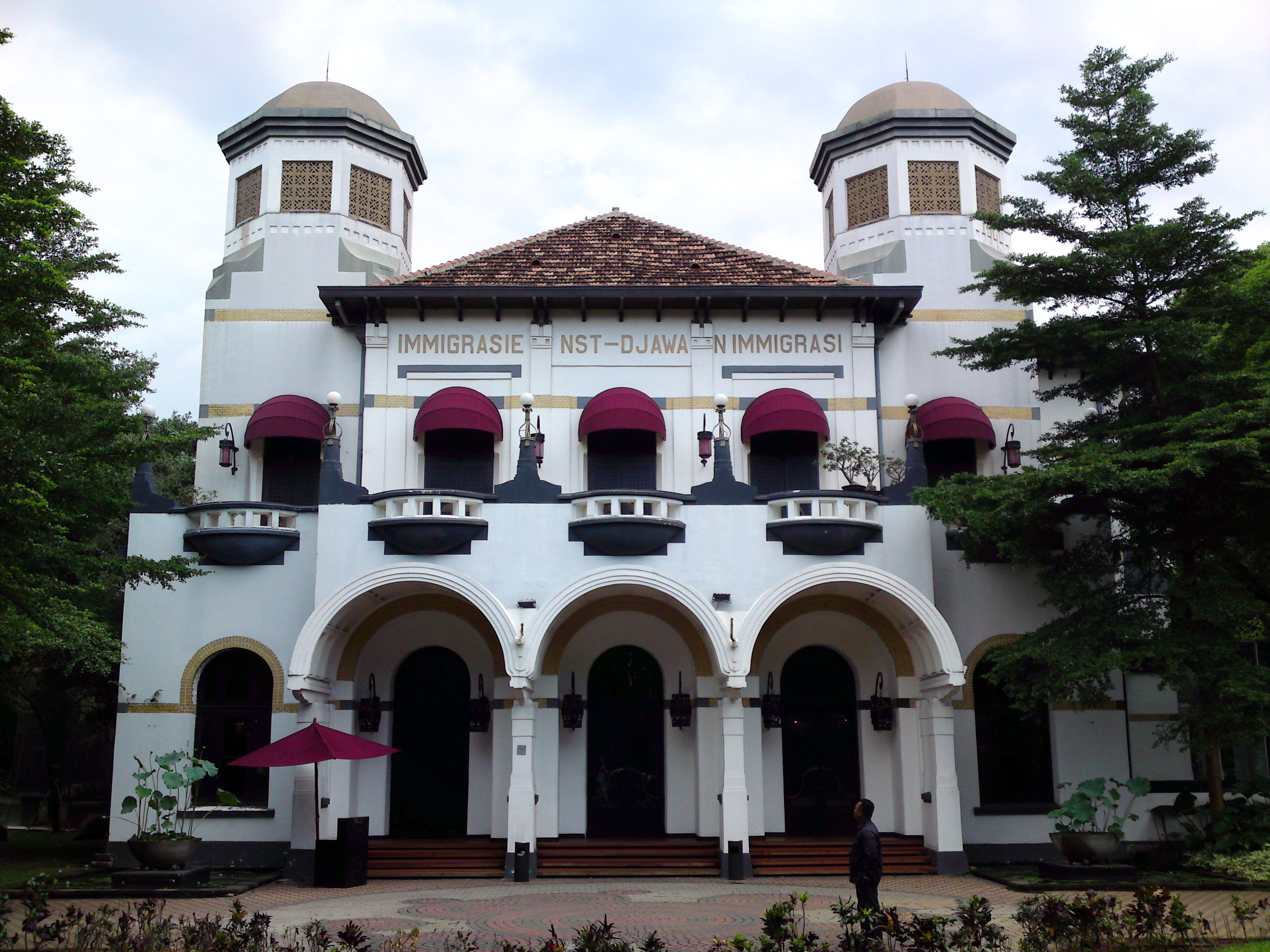
- Interactive map of the Kunstkring Art Gallery area
- Former names: Buddha Bar, Immigrasie Dienst, Bataviasche Kunstkring

General information
- Architectural style: Dutch Rationalism, New Indies style
- Location: Central Jakarta, Indonesia, Jl. Teuku Umar No. 1 Menteng
- Coordinates: 6.188898°S 106.833497°E
- Current tenants: Bistro Boulevard
- Construction started: 1913
- Completed: 1914
- Inaugurated: 17 April 1914

Design and construction
- Architect: P.A.J. Moojen

Other information
- Public transit: Gondangdia

The Kunstkring Art Gallery (Indonesian: Galeri Seni Kunstkring) is a heritage building located in Central Jakarta, Indonesia. Built in 1914, following the design of Dutch architect P.A.J. Moojen, it originally housed the local art circle. After several changes of use, in 2011 the building has been restored, with the upper floor used as an art gallery while the ground floor has been converted into a restaurant.

== History ==
The Kunstkring is the second building designed by P.A.J. Moojen in Jakarta. It was designed as a civic landmark, welcoming visitors to the new Menteng Residential Area. Kunstkring Art Center was intended to become the cultural center of early 20th-century Batavia. Moojen himself was first, the secretary, and then president (1910) of the Bataviasche Kunstkring which was created to advance interest in the visual/plastic and decorative arts.

The building was made possible through the donation of the land by one of the construction companies that participated in building the Menteng Residential Area. Construction of the building started in 1913, and it was inaugurated on April 17, 1914 by the Governor General of Dutch Indies Alexander Willem Frederik Idenburg as the overseer of the Nederlandsch Indische Kunstkring. Through rental of the lower floor to commercial uses, Kunstkring generated a cash flow for its operations. The art gallery historically had exhibited the work of famous European artist, such as Vincent van Gogh, Pablo Picasso, Paul Gauguin, Piet Ouborg and Marc Chagall.

The building housed the Kunstkring until 1942 before it functioned as the head office of Majelis Islam A’la Indonesia (High Islamic Council of Indonesia) (1942–1945), and then used as the Immigration Office for Central Jakarta (1950–1997).

In 1997, the building was sold to Tommy Soeharto. It was left neglected and thus stripped by robbers. The window frames and stairs were removed, taken to the black market. In 2003, on the order of the then-Governor Sutiyoso, the government bought back the building. The facade of the building was restored gradually, although without clear parameters. Many of the structural and decorative elements of the building were randomly replaced, while the looted parts remained missing.

=== Buddha Bar controversy ===
The conversion of the ground floor to a private bar generated public controversy. In 2008, it was revealed that the building was going to house an exclusive club owned by an international franchise chain, the Buddha Bar. The issues debated in the mass media and in a range of discussion forums became out of control. There were protests coming from some Buddhists who considered the name of the bar insulting.

In 2011, the owners redesigned the concept of the building. The upper floor of the building was converted into an art gallery, similar with the previous use of the building, while the lower floor was converted into a restaurant with an architecture that is similar in language with old Batavian architecture.

=== Now ===
In April 2013, the building was reopened as Tugu Kunstkring Paleis. Understanding the original purpose of Kunstkring as a center of art and culture, Tugu Group reinstated its function opening the second floor as a gallery to exhibit creations from Indonesian artists. Despite most of the rooms and the main hall on the first floor have been turned into a fine dining restaurant, it is decorated with numerous art collections and antiques embodying the art, soul, and romance of Indonesia. A room is also dedicated to Raden Saleh, one of the pioneer of Indonesian romantic painters.

== Architecture ==
The design follows the principles of rationalist architecture, known as New Indies style to oppose with the older Indies Style

The edifice was the first to use reinforced concrete in Indonesia.

The main facade has three entrance doors between two similarly designed windows. The upper floor of the main facade contains five balconies with balustrades which unify the three doors and two windows below. The building has two towers. The original decorative lamps have been missing, while the stained glass was looted in 1999.

The interior was decorated with dark wood panelling. The large staircase is located to the side of the building, connecting the lower floor with the upper floor. The lower floor originally consisted of a large room surrounded by smaller rooms which were used as the administration office for the Nederlandsch Indische Kunstkring. In 1999, the lower floor was converted into a single continuous large room. The upper floor was used as an art gallery and sometimes rented as reception room. The building was a landmark in the Menteng area. Today, the upper floor has been reconverted into an art gallery.

== See also ==
- Colonial architecture in Jakarta
- New Indies style
