= Bali Museum =

Museum of art and history in Bali

- ᬫᬸᬲᬾᬳᬸᬫ᭄ᬩᬮᬶ
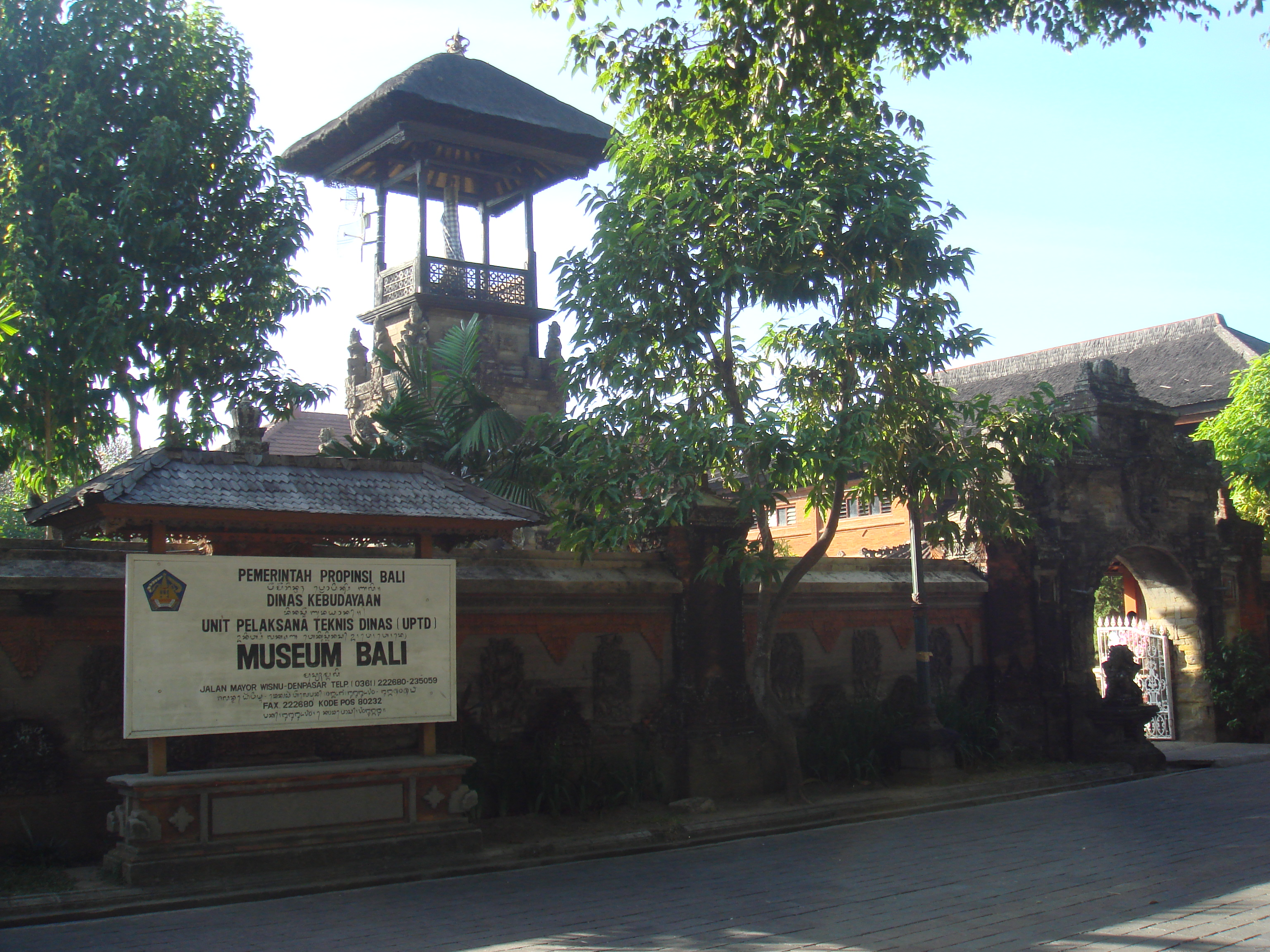
- Frontview

- Location in Denpasar, Bali and Indonesia Bali Museum (Bali) Bali Museum (Indonesia)
- Established: 1931
- Location: Denpasar
- Coordinates: 8°39′27″S 115°13′6.7″E

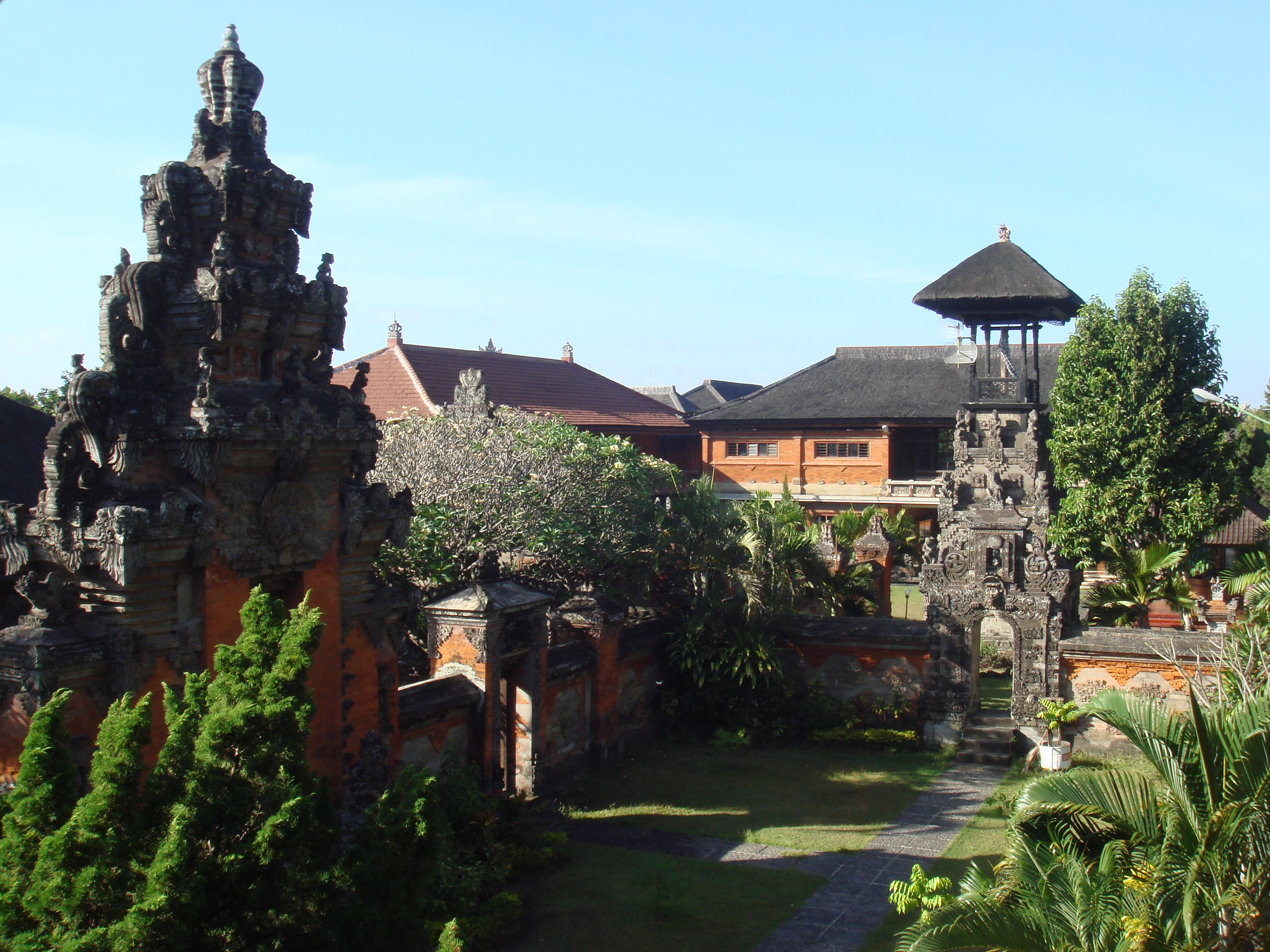
Bali Museum, inside courtyards and gates, seen from the belvedere

The Bali Museum is an art and history museum in Denpasar, Bali, Indonesia. Established in 1931, it houses collections relating to Balinese art, culture and history. The museum stands on the eastern side of Taman Puputan, the central square of Denpasar.

== Description ==
The museum was built in 1931 by the architect P.J. Moojen, near the site of the former royal palace of Denpasar, which had been burnt to the ground during the Dutch intervention in Bali (1906). The palace served as a model for the museum's outer walls and courtyards.

== Collections ==
The museum has four main buildings. Tabanan houses theatrical masks and musical instruments, Karangasem contains sculptures and paintings, Buleleng displays textiles, and Timur houses archaeological finds.

== Gallery ==
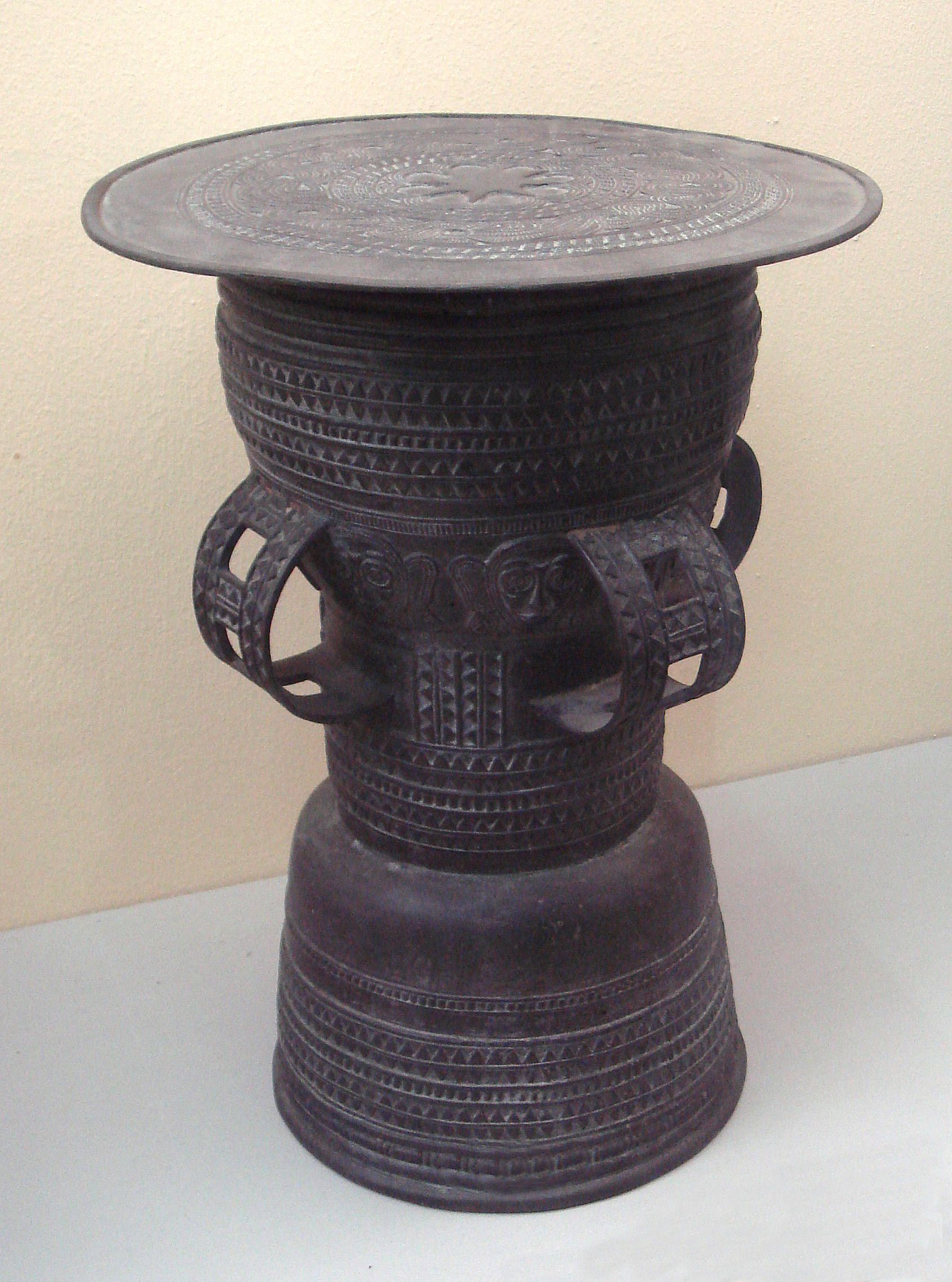
Bronze Age ceremonial drum.

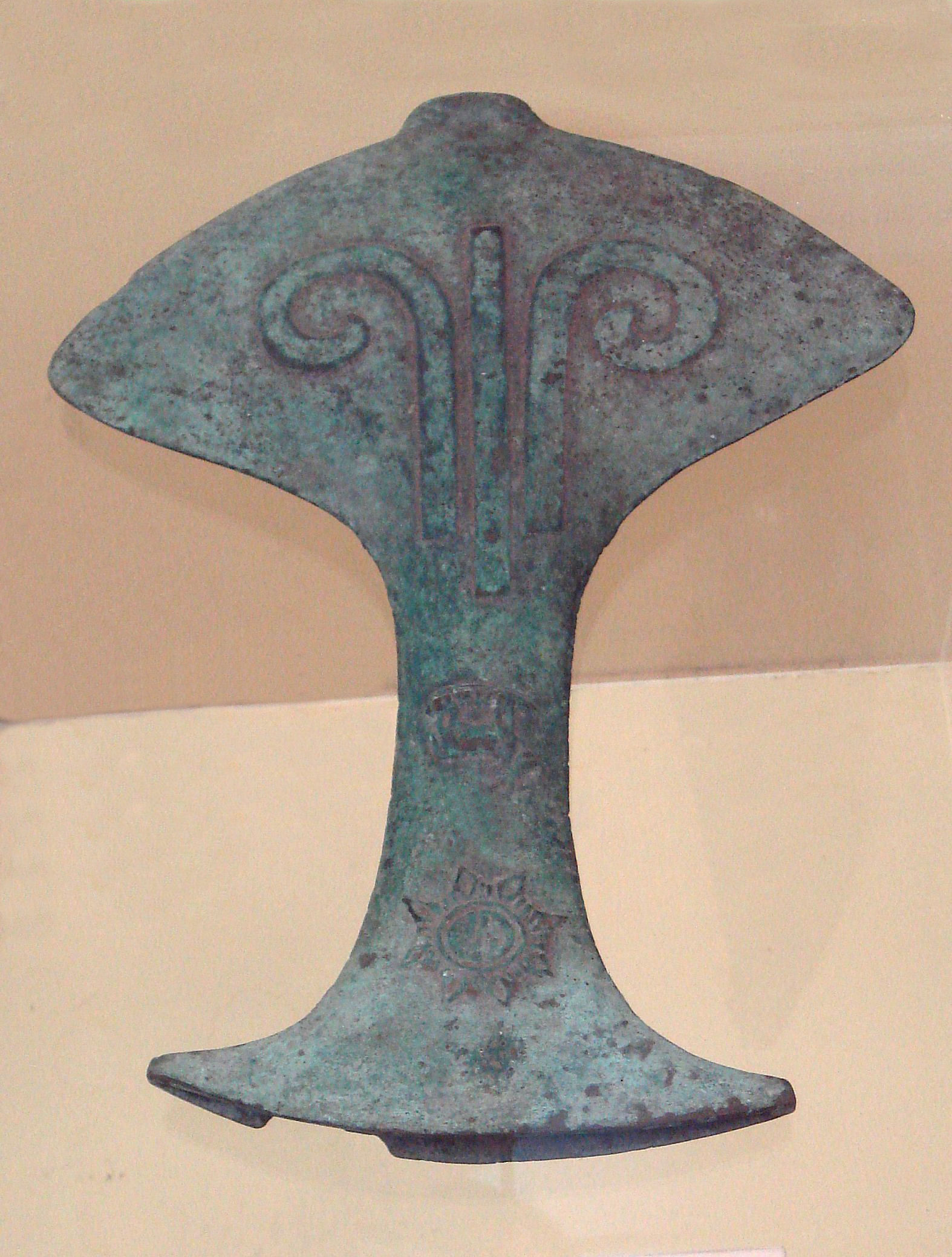
Bronze Age spear.

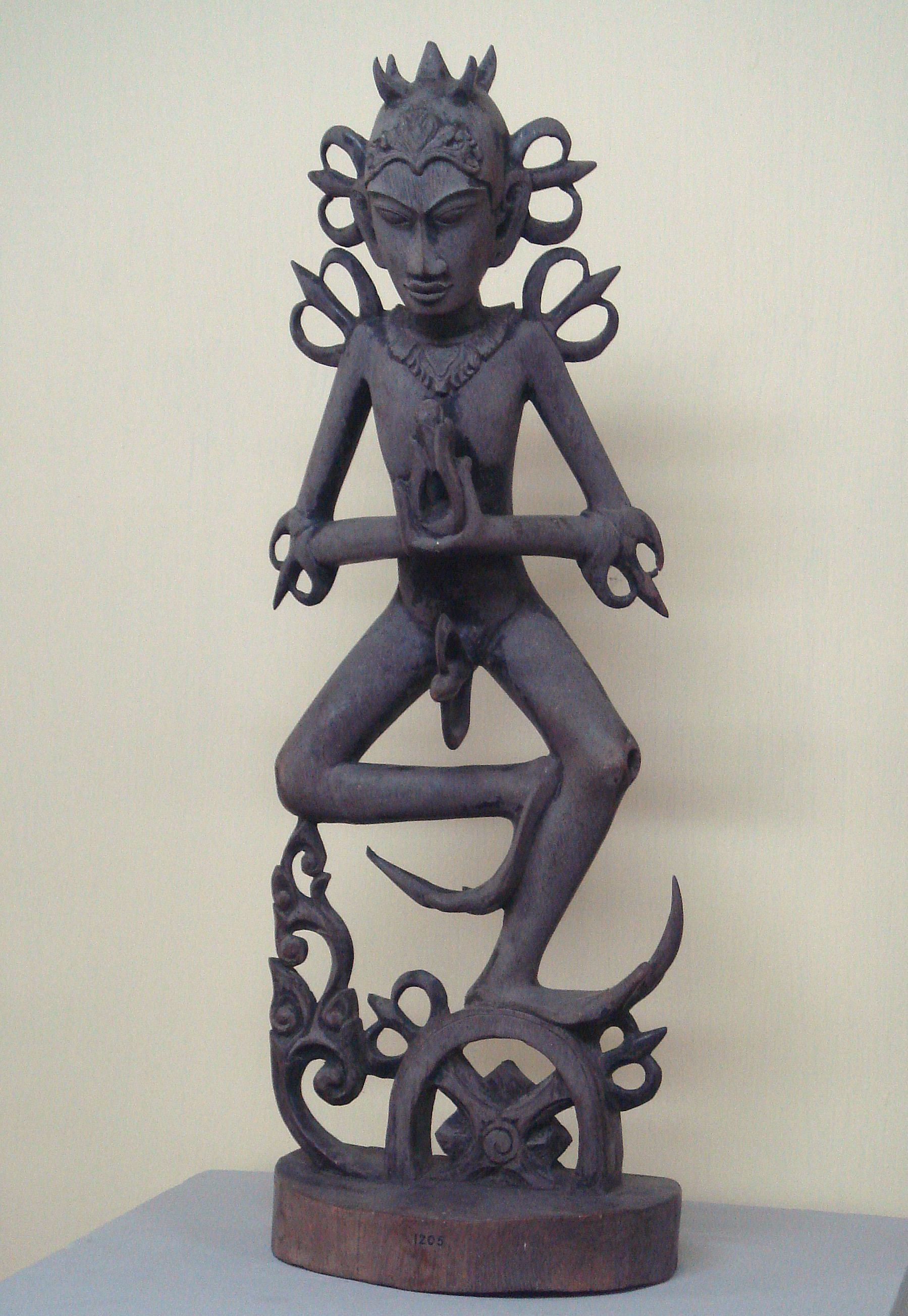
Statuette of Acintya.

== See also ==
- History of Bali
- Museum Pasifika

== Literature ==
- Lenzi, Iola (2004). Museums of Southeast Asia. Singapore: Archipelago Press. p. 200. ISBN 981-4068-96-9.
