= Nederlandsch-Indische Levensverzekerings en Lijfrente Maatschappij =

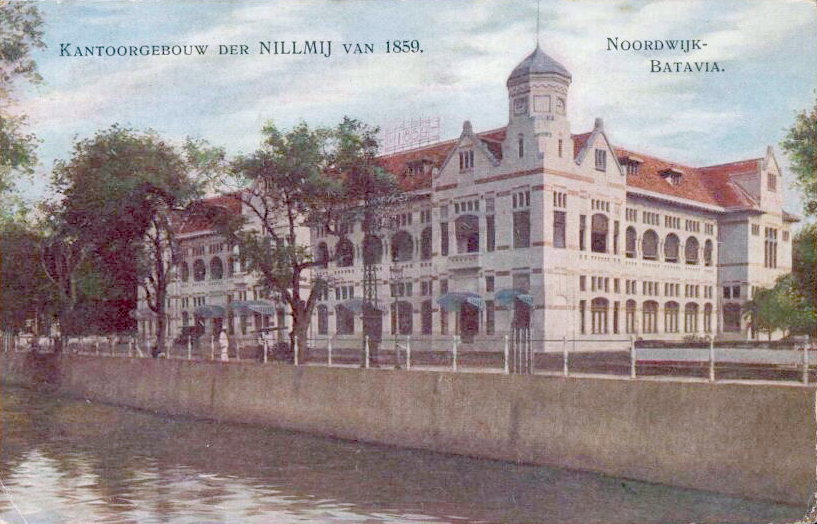
Postcard of NILLMIJ building in Jakarta

The Nederlandsch-Indische Levensverzekerings en Lijfrente Maatschappij (NILLMIJ, lit. 'Dutch [East] Indies Life Insurance and Pension Company') was a prominent Dutch insurance company with extensive operations in the Dutch East Indies and the Netherlands. following the independence of Indonesia, its operations in the country were nationalized like those of other major Dutch financial firms, and formed the foundation for today's Asuransi Jiwasraya. The Dutch activities continued and, through multiple mergers, became one of the predecessor entities of Aegon N.V.

== History ==
The Nederlandsch-Indische Levensverzekerings en Lijfrente Maatschappij was founded in 1859 by CFW Wiggers Kerchem, who later worked as President of the Bank of Java. Until 1932 the company was named SA Life Insurance Company NILLMIJ.

During its early years, NILLMIJ benefited from close ties with the colonial government in the Dutch East Indies, giving it a near monopoly until 1883, when other insurers were allowed to operate in the colony. In 1939, NILLMIJ expanded its operations by acquiring NV Java Hypotheekbank, further solidifying its presence in the Dutch East Indies.

In 1952, the Dutch activities were expanded through a merger with the Life Insurance Corporation Arnhem. The company came was led by the mathematician John Engelfriet, who was one of the first to take the initiative to introduce computers. In 1956, the computer business Electrologica formed as a subsidiary of the NILLMIJ, which in 1966 was sold to Philips. In 1969, NILLMIJ merged with another insurance company, the First Dutch, and was renamed Ennia. In 1983 Ennia in turn merged with Dutch insurer AGO to form Aegon.

The NILLMIJ constructed several architecturally significant buildings in the Dutch East Indies, reflecting its prominence during the colonial period. Notable examples include offices in Jakarta, Semarang, and Bandung, many of which have survived long after the company ceased operations in Indonesia.

== Gallery ==
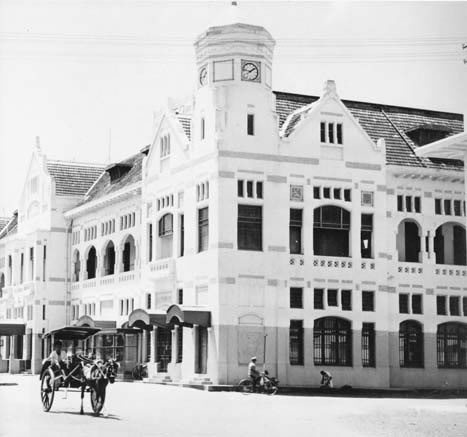
NILLMIJ head office, Batavia, in the early 20th century

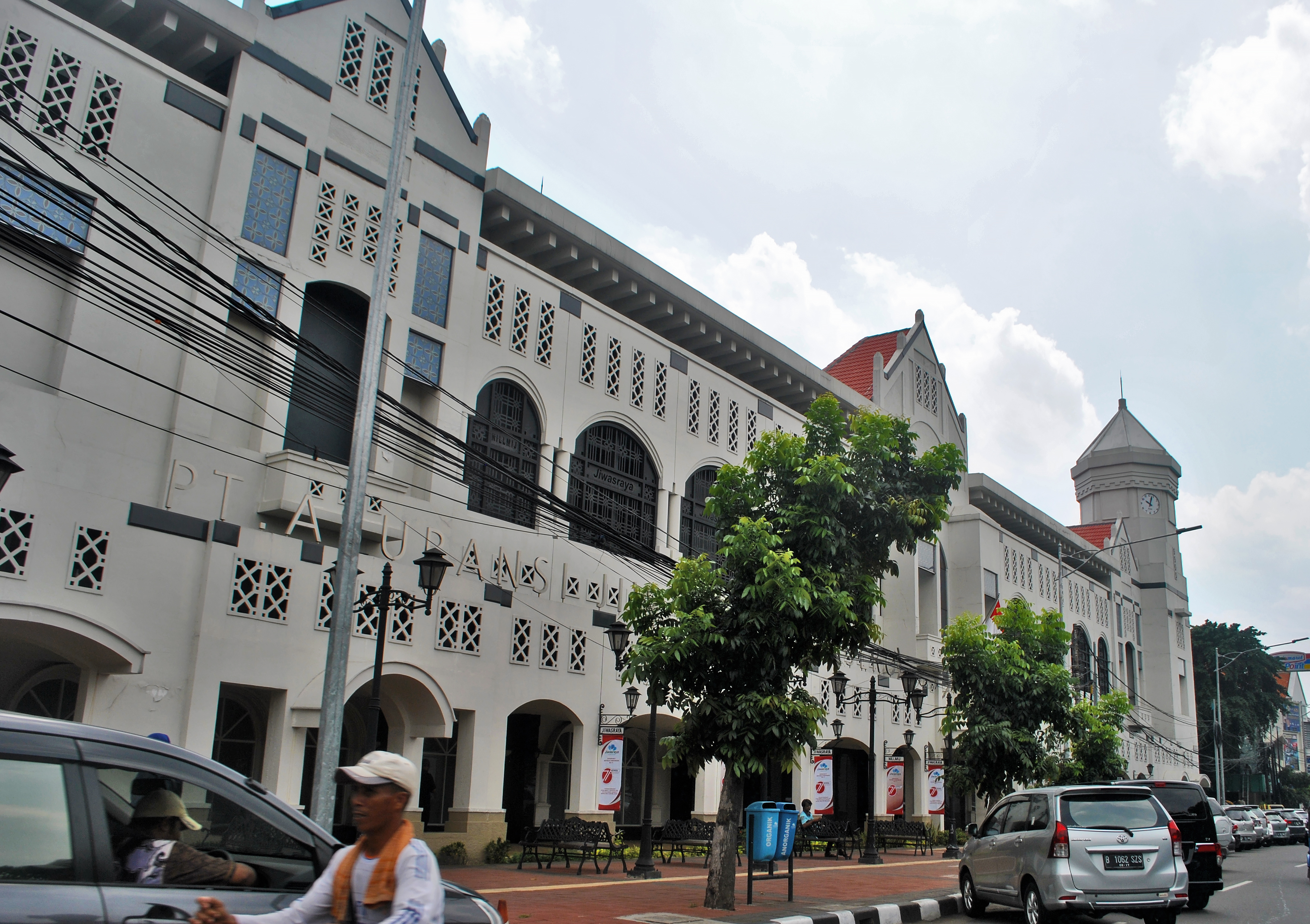
The same building in 2016, now head office of Asuransi Jiwasraya in Jakarta

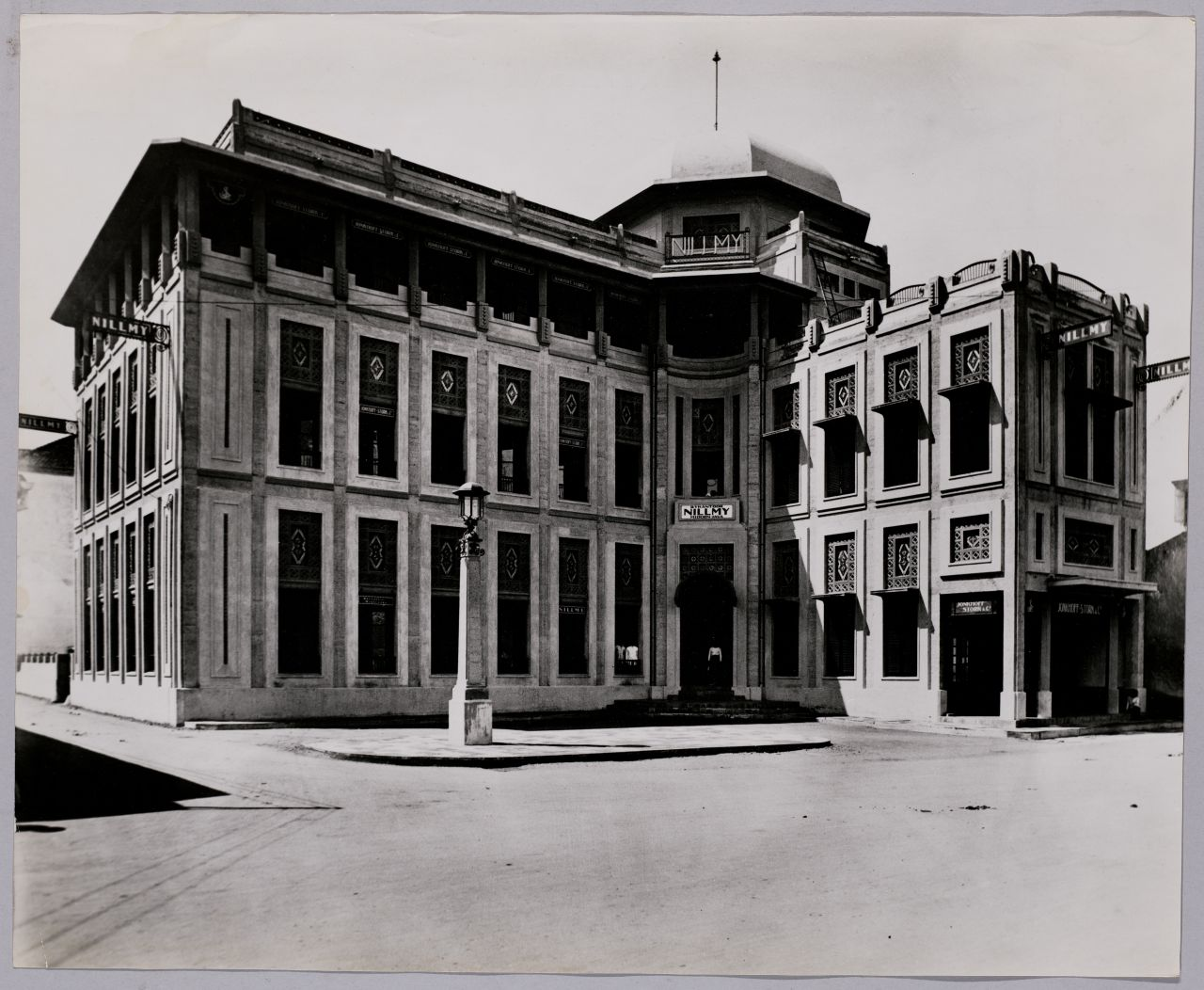
NILLMIJ office in Semarang; now branch of Asuransi Jiwasraya

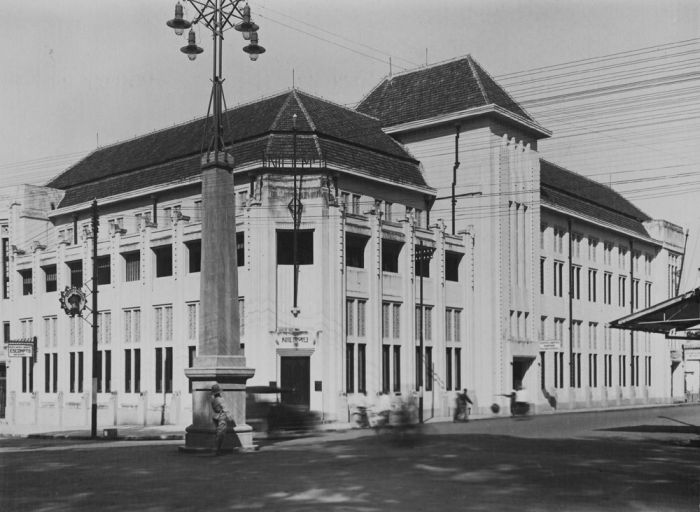
NILLMIJ office in Yogyakarta

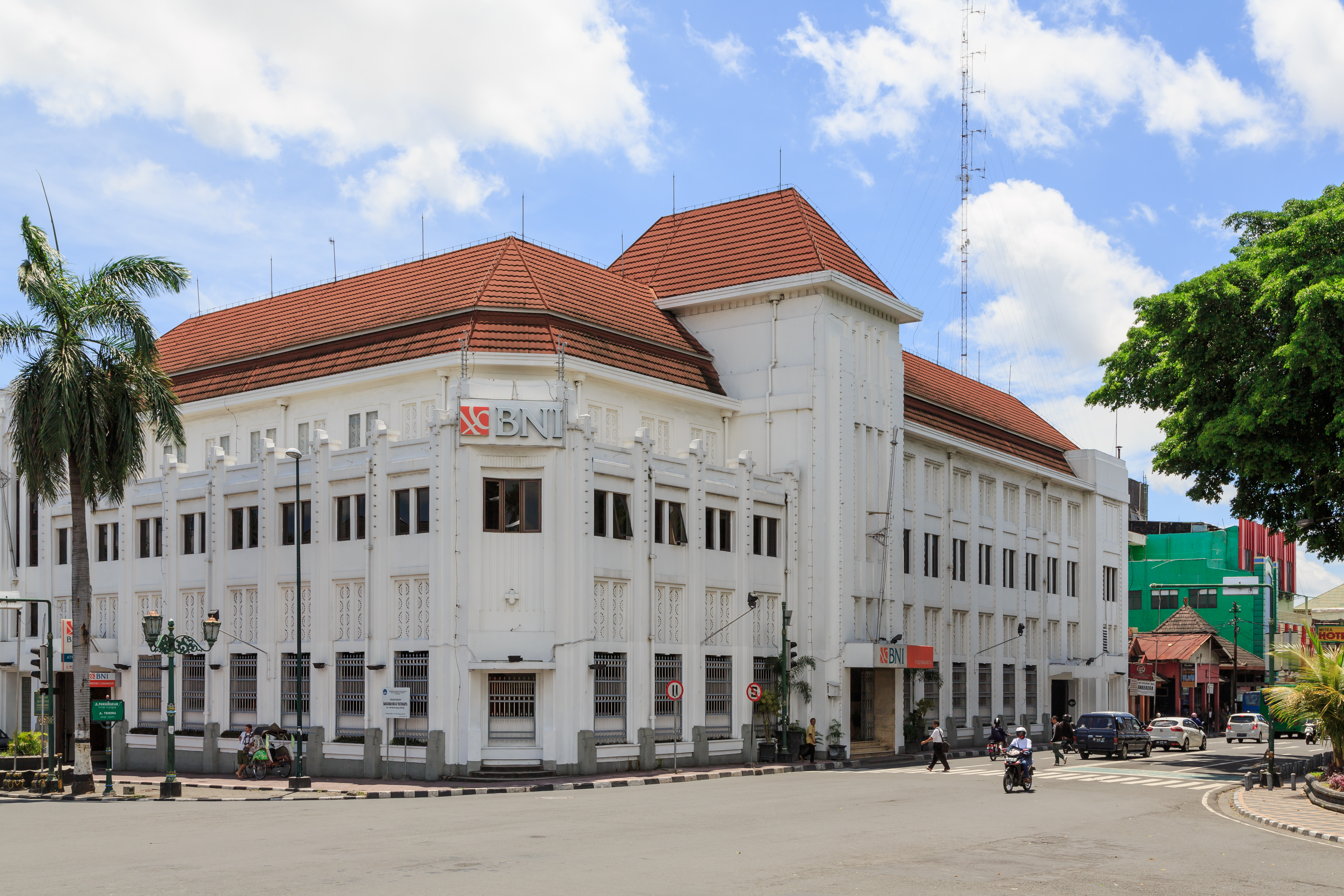
The same building in 2016, now Bank Negara Indonesia

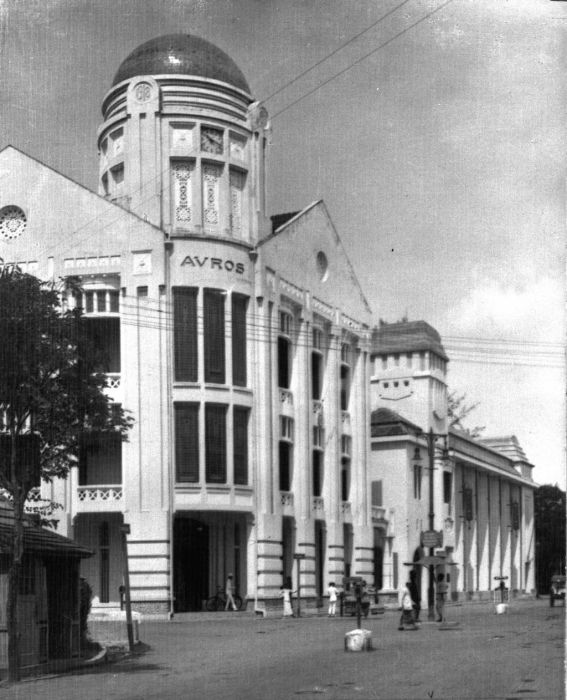
NILLMIJ office in Medan (right), 1920s

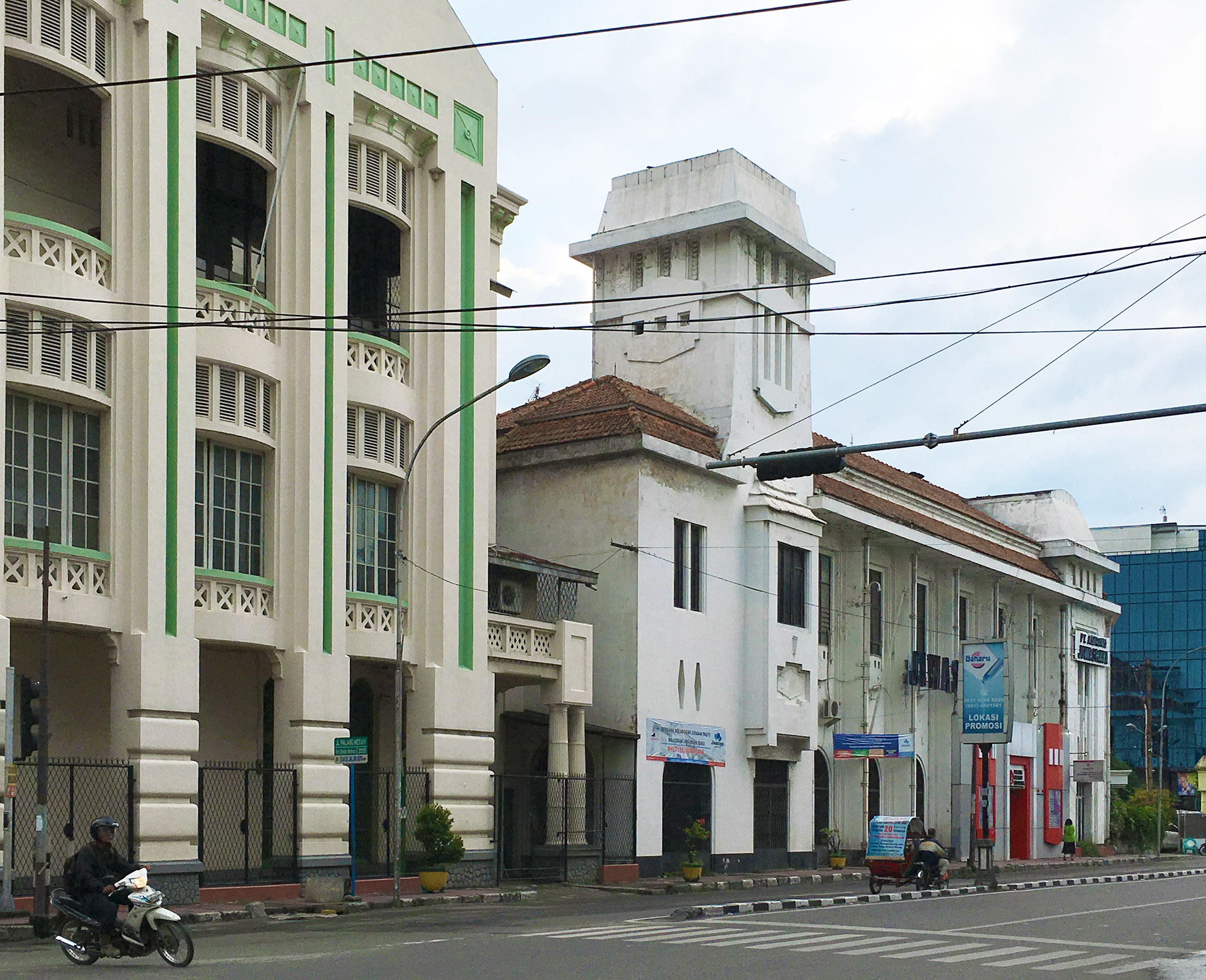
The same building in 2016, now Asuransi Jiwasraya

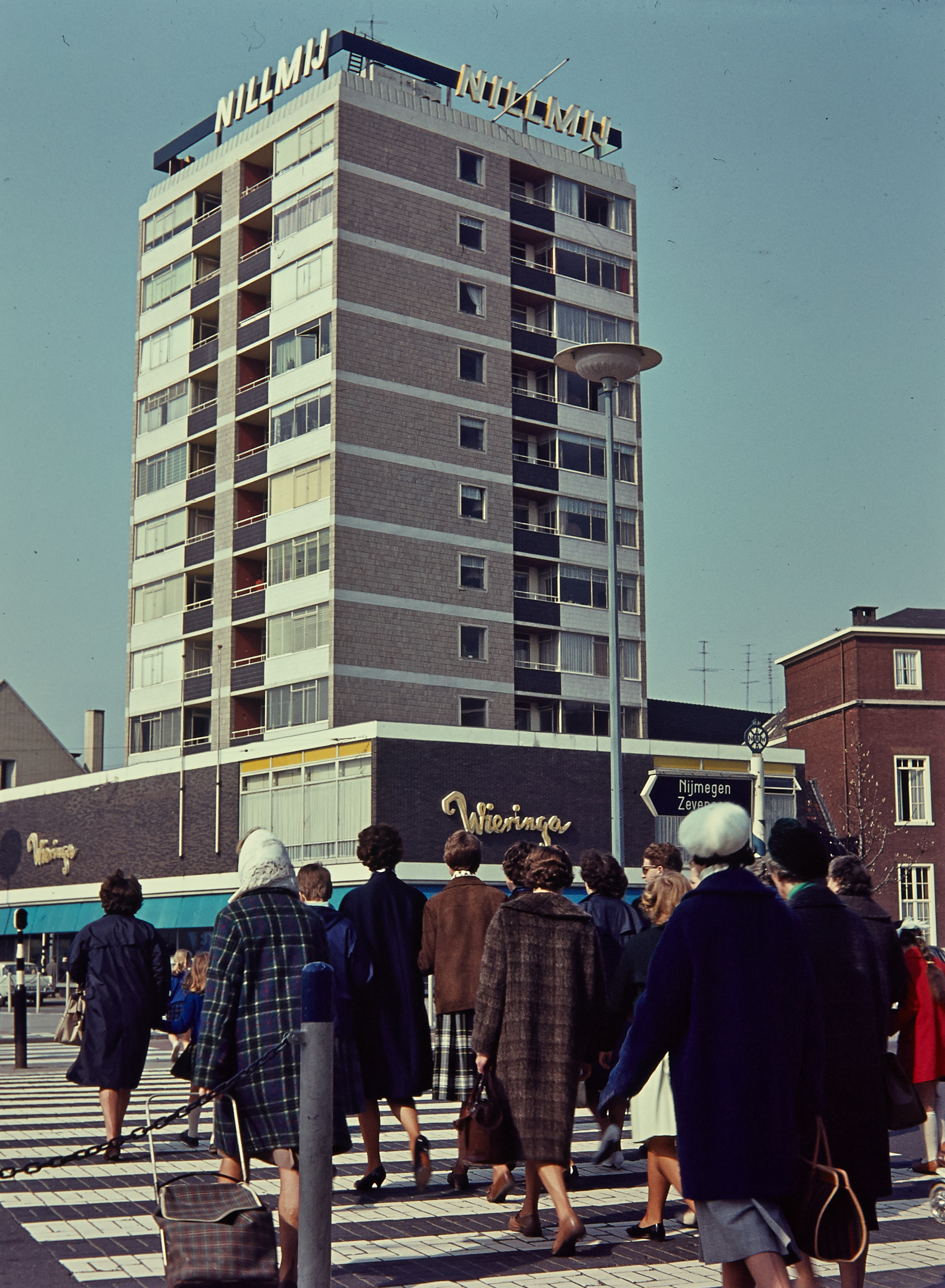
NILLMIJ tower in Arnhem, 1963

== See also ==
- Bank of Java
- Nederlandsch-Indische Escompto Maatschappij

== Sources ==
- 1859 - 1959 Netherlands before a hundred years. Commemorative book published on the occasion of the centenary of the Nillmij. Compiled by Prof. Dr. W. Jappe Alberts and Dr. Jonkvrouwe JM Winter. Published in 1959. Reprinted in 1962.
- To Know Nillmij / Netherlands Indies Life insurance and Annuity Company (Nillmij) issued in Amsterdam circa 1940 by De Bussy.
- BPA Gales, Working on security, a look back over the shoulder of AEGON two centuries of insurance history, AEGON Insurance in 1986.
