= Museum Pasifika =

Art museum in Bali, Indonesia

Coordinates: 8.8000°S 115.2306°E

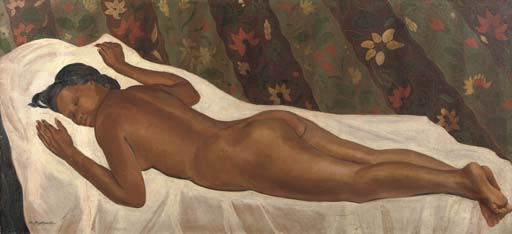
Reclining nude by Czesław Mystkowski

Museum Pasifika is an art museum in Nusa Dua, Bali, Indonesia. Its collection focuses on art and cultural material from the Asia-Pacific region.

The museum was founded in 2006 by Moetaryanto P. and Philippe Augier. Its building was designed by Popo Danes.

== Collection ==
The museum's collection includes more than 600 works by approximately 200 artists from 25 countries. The permanent collection is arranged across a series of galleries devoted to Indonesian, European, Asian and Pacific art:

- Room VII: Art from Laos, Vietnam and Cambodia
- Room VIII: Art from Polynesia and Tahiti
- Room IX: Art from Vanuatu and the Pacific Islands, including works by Aloi Pilioko and Nicolai Michoutouchkine
- Room X: Tapa art from Oceania and the Pacific
- Room XI: Art from Japan, China, Thailand, Malaysia, Myanmar and the Philippines
