= Rumoh Aceh =

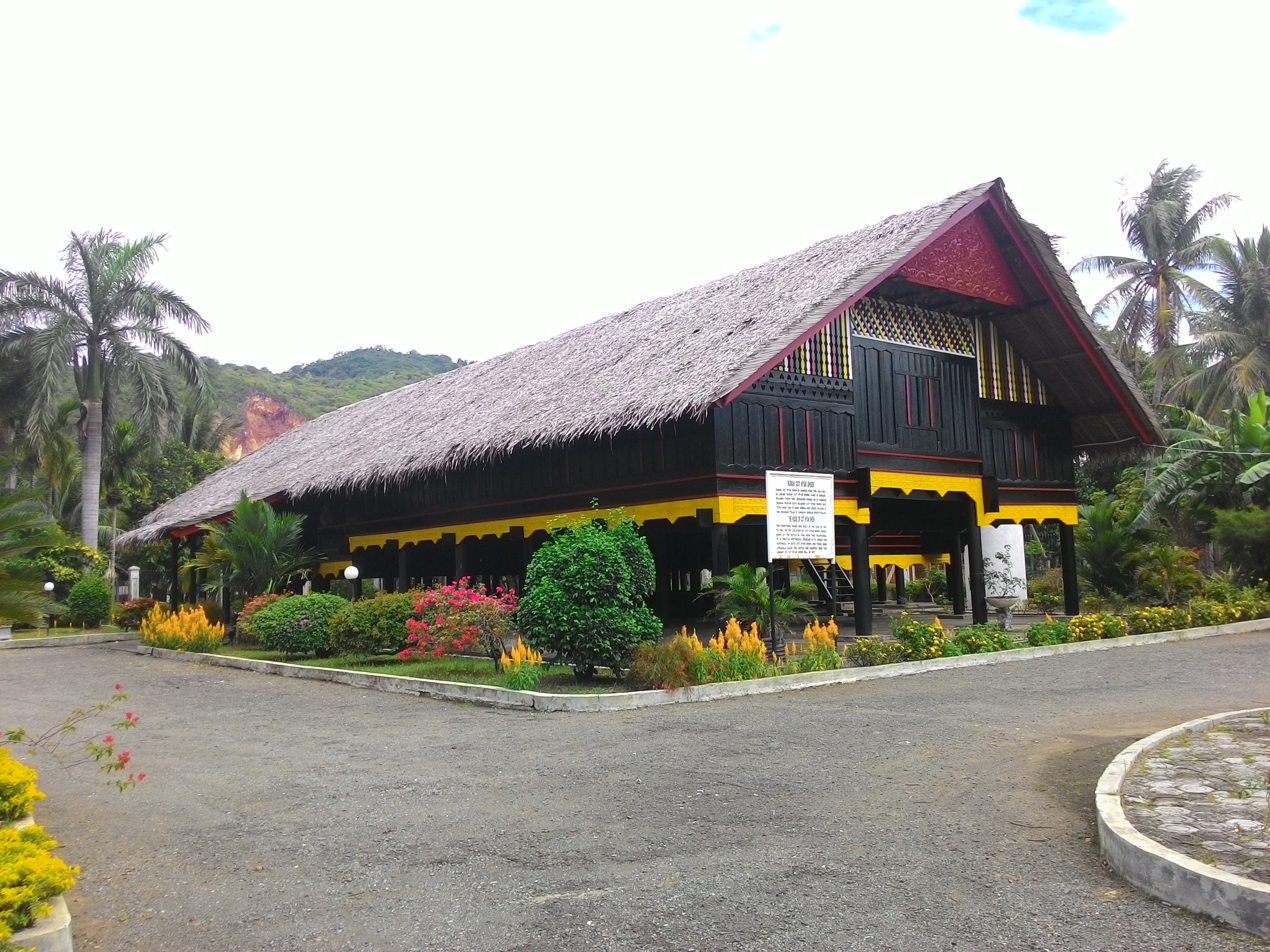
- The House of Cut Nyak Dhien, a sample of a traditional house of Aceh, the Rumoh Aceh
- Alternative names: Rumah Adat Rumoh Aceh

General information
- Status: Residences
- Type: Traditional House
- Architectural style: Indonesian
- Town or city: Aceh
- Country: Indonesia
- Owner: Acehnese

Rumoh Aceh (Acehnese: "Aceh house") is a type of traditional vernacular house found in the Aceh Province in Indonesia. It is basically a wooden pile dwelling. Rumoh Aceh is the largest and tallest of all vernacular house types found in Aceh Province, the others are the Rumoh Santeut and the Rangkang.

The Rumoh Aceh reflects the culture of the Acehnese people. These houses can still be found in the periphery of Banda Aceh, although they are on the verge of extinction.

== The house and its perimeter ==
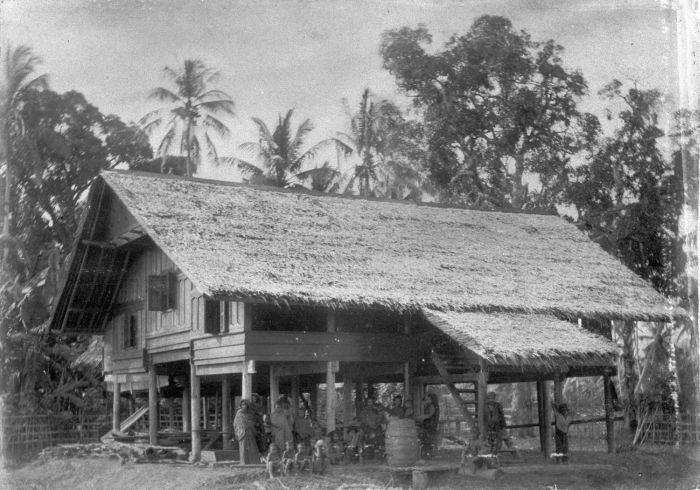
The frontal side of a Rumoh Aceh, the main entrance stairways is visible, leading to a roofed front terrace.

Rumoh Aceh is a pile dwelling erected over posts which rest on flat stones or concrete plinth. It is constructed of timbers, topped with a wooden gabled roof which is covered with either thatched palm leaves or corrugated metal. Rumoh Aceh are found scattered in a traditional kampung (Acehnese: gampong) with no specific pattern; however, they are always aligned with their gables positioned toward the east and west. The exterior can be ornamented with woodcarvings of floral or geometric patterns, usually found in the triangular gables, around the windows and on the boards. The triangular gable decoration consists of an ornamented triangular wooden screen which slant outwards and is perforated to allow cross ventilation. The houses' entrances are located on the non-gabled (north or south) sides. This entrance is a steep staircases leading to a roofed front terrace (Acehnese: seulasa, "veranda"). The space below the house is used for storing goods such as timber for construction, firewood, crops, or bicycles; or for a resting area, with benches.

The house area is marked by perimeter hedges or fences. Occasional trees provide shade into the house's courtyard. The rice granary (Acehnese: krōng padé, "rice storage") is a small rice granary located under or beside the house. Unlike rice granaries in Java, which hold sheaves of rice, rice granaries in Aceh hold unhusked rice.

Wealthier Acehnese may build a wooden gateway entrance (Acehnese: keupaleh) at the entrance of the house area.

== Interior layout ==
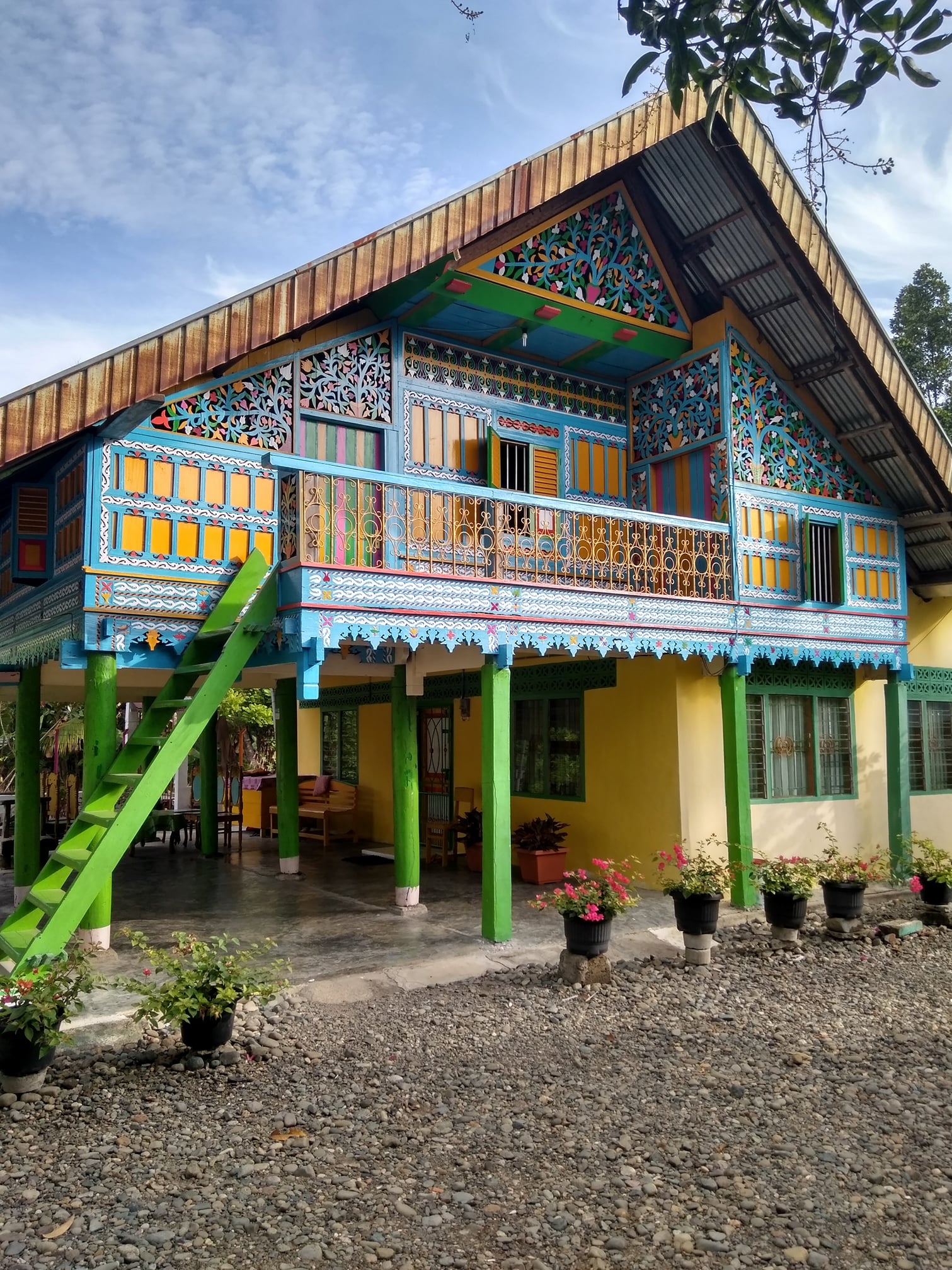
Rumoh santeuet in Lam Baro, Glumpang Tiga, Pidie

Rumoh Aceh are always oriented with their gables facing east and west. The east–west direction may originally have been connected with life-death – this sacred-profane symbolism is commonly found in Indonesia. After the Islamization of Aceh, the west direction is sometimes associated with the direction of Mecca. The interior of a Rumoh Aceh is divided into three sections: the front (the northern or southern breadth of the house, where the entrance stairs are located), the middle (the central breadth of the house), and the rear (similar to the front, but on the opposite side). These separate areas are divided by wooden partitions; a corridor connected the front section with the back section through the middle section.

The front section (Acehnese: seuramou keue, "front terrace") is basically a long spacious gallery. Steep entrance stairs connect the front section of the house with the outdoors. The Acehnese name of this section, the "front terrace" or "front veranda", refers to former times when this section used to be completely open. Nowadays, the section is completely enclosed, though it may have some windows. The front section is identified with the "male" realm of the house; similar symbolism is found throughout the Indonesian archipelago to refer to the section of a house where public-related activities, such as receiving guests and reading the Qur'an, are held. The section is also the area where young men sleep.

The rear section (Acehnese: seuramoe likoot, "back terrace") is similar to the front section, in that it is a spacious long gallery, but lacks a main entrance. It is the most private part of the house, where women of the house do their cooking activities. The rear section is identified with the "female" realm, associated with family matters. The rear section may be expanded to add more space for cooking (Acehnese: rumoh dapu, "kitchen house").

The middle section (Acehnese: rumah inong, "parental house") consists of a corridor (Acehnese: rambat) connecting the front section and the rear section through the center of the house, and bedrooms. Bedrooms are located on both side of this corridor, to the east and west, toward the gables. The east-side bedroom, used for the daughter, is known as anjong. The west-side bedroom, the main bedroom of the household, is known as jurei. The bedrooms can be accessed from the back section via doorways. The entire middle section is built about half a meter higher than the front section and back section, the difference in elevation is clearly visible from the outside of the house. One of the bedrooms functions as a ceremonial nuptial chamber, where daughters and their husbands will reside during the first years of their marriage. One can see the middle section as the most important part of the house, in relation to the lower sections of the male front section and the female rear section, a place for a bedroom where procreation may takes place.

== Construction ==
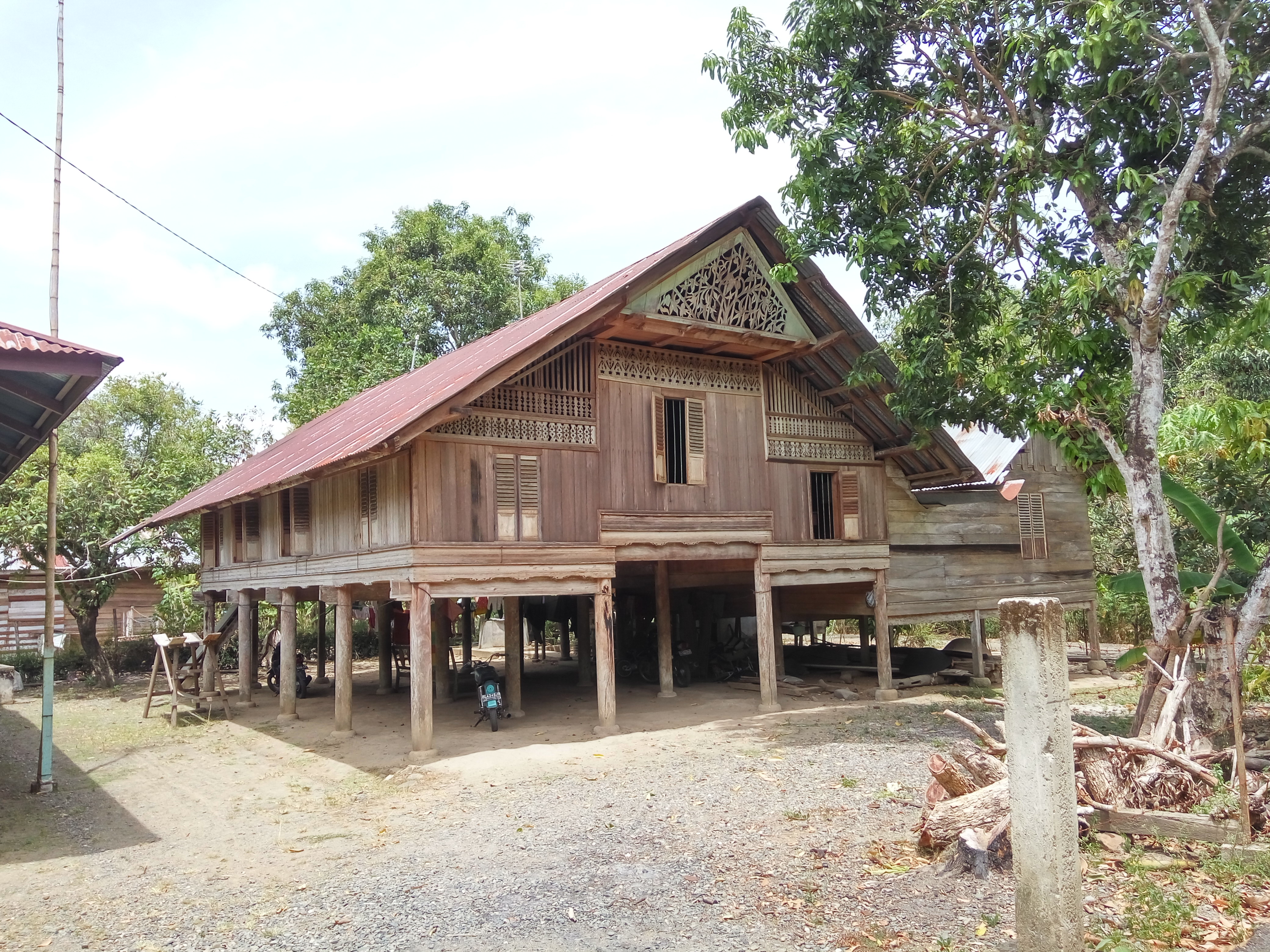
Acehnese traditional house in Piyeung Datu village, Montasik district, Aceh Besar regency

Rumoh Aceh are made entirely of wood, without nails. Traditionally, the floors are made of feather palm planks, the walls of thin woven bamboo, and the roof of thatched sago palm leaves. The entire construction is erected over pile construction which stands on stones. The ground under the house is compacted and made a bit higher than the area around the house, the soil is prevented from seeping away by edgings around this compacted soil. In the colonial era, the edgings were made of bottles planted into the ground bottom-up.

When a daughter reached the age of seven, her father will start collecting building materials for the construction of the house where his daughter will live with her future husband. According to Acehnese custom, the girl has to live with her husband in the house of her mother until the first child is born. Afterwards she is allowed to move to her own house, within the compound of her mother. When her parents died, the daughter will acquire the rice fields and her parents' house.

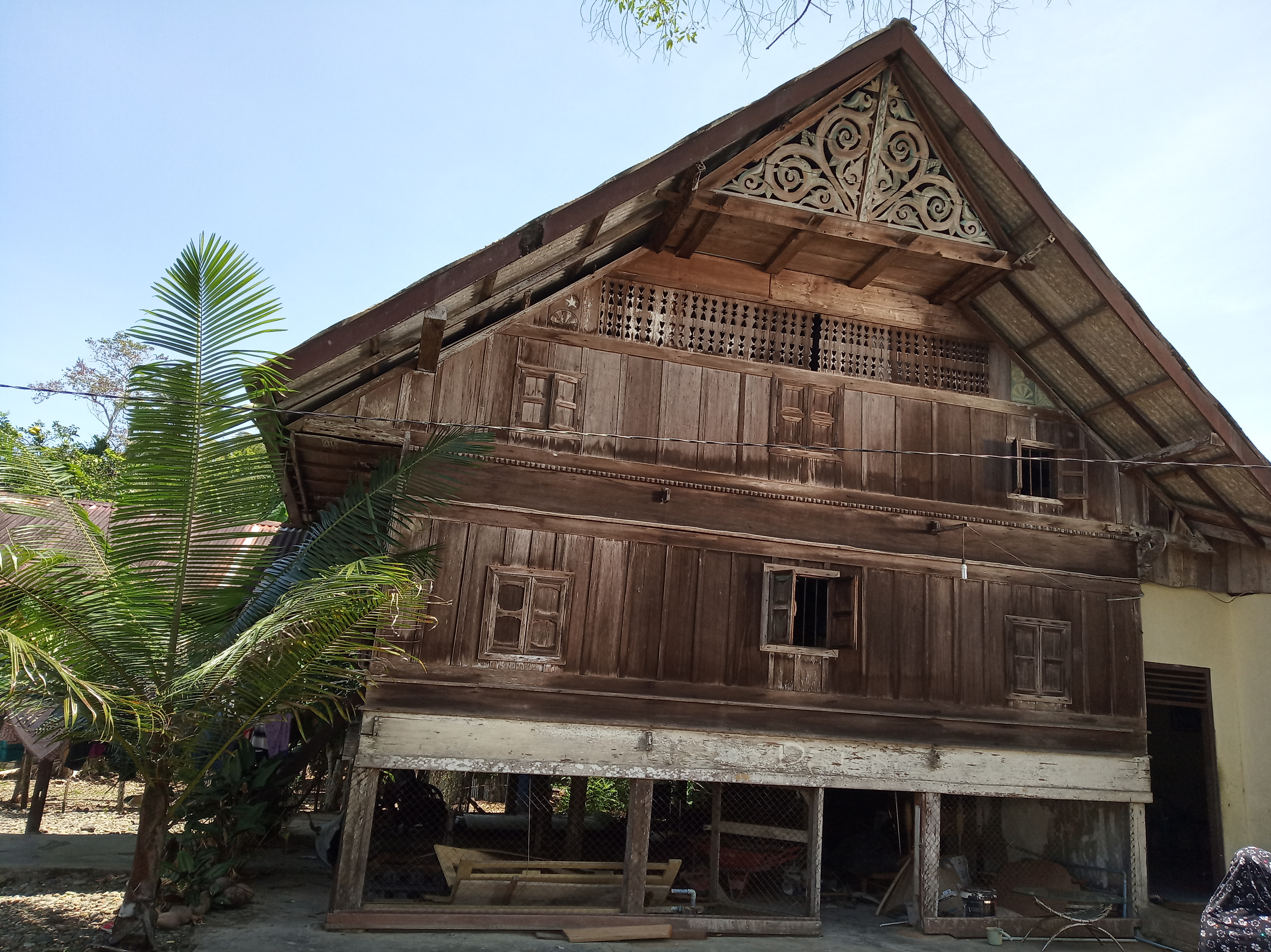
An Acehnese house in Nagan Raya

House construction begins with the erection of posts for the tallest middle section of the house, and then followed by the shorter posts for the front and rear section. Two of the house posts are named the "king post" (Acehnese: tameh raja) and "queen post" (Acehnese: tameh putrou) respectively. Both are located between the middle section and the front section, the "king post" on the right (north) side, the "queen post" on the left (south) side. A small piece of gold is inserted into the "queen post", either at its top or on one of the floor binders when mortised through the "queen post" and fixed by the wooden tenon. These posts are set as if they are still living trees, with the trunk base at the bottom and crown tip above. The last to be built are the roof plates. Ropes are used to fix the roof plates to the beams in such a way that the roof can be detached quickly in case of fire. Woodcarving decorations are not part of the construction phase, as such constructions are added much later.

Determining the starting time of the construction is a crucial matter in the Acehnese culture. The house owner engages a traditional carpenter in the particular month thought to be the most auspicious to begin construction. Several rituals are carried out during the construction process: first when the posts and beams are erected, second when the main house building is constructed, and third after the construction is completed. The first ceremony is the sprinkling of raw materials such as uncooked rice and water at the site, completed with a small meal. The second ceremony is a ceremonial meal for the assistants of the carpenter, usually fifteen in number. The third and last ceremony is a big ceremonial feast served for as many people as the owner wants to invite.

Acehnese people use traditional units for the house construction. The primary units are the jaroe (finger), paleut (width of the back of the hand), and hah (cubit). Secondary units are the jeungkai (distance between the spread-out thumb and middle finger), lhuek (length of the whole arm), and deupa (fathom).

== Decline ==
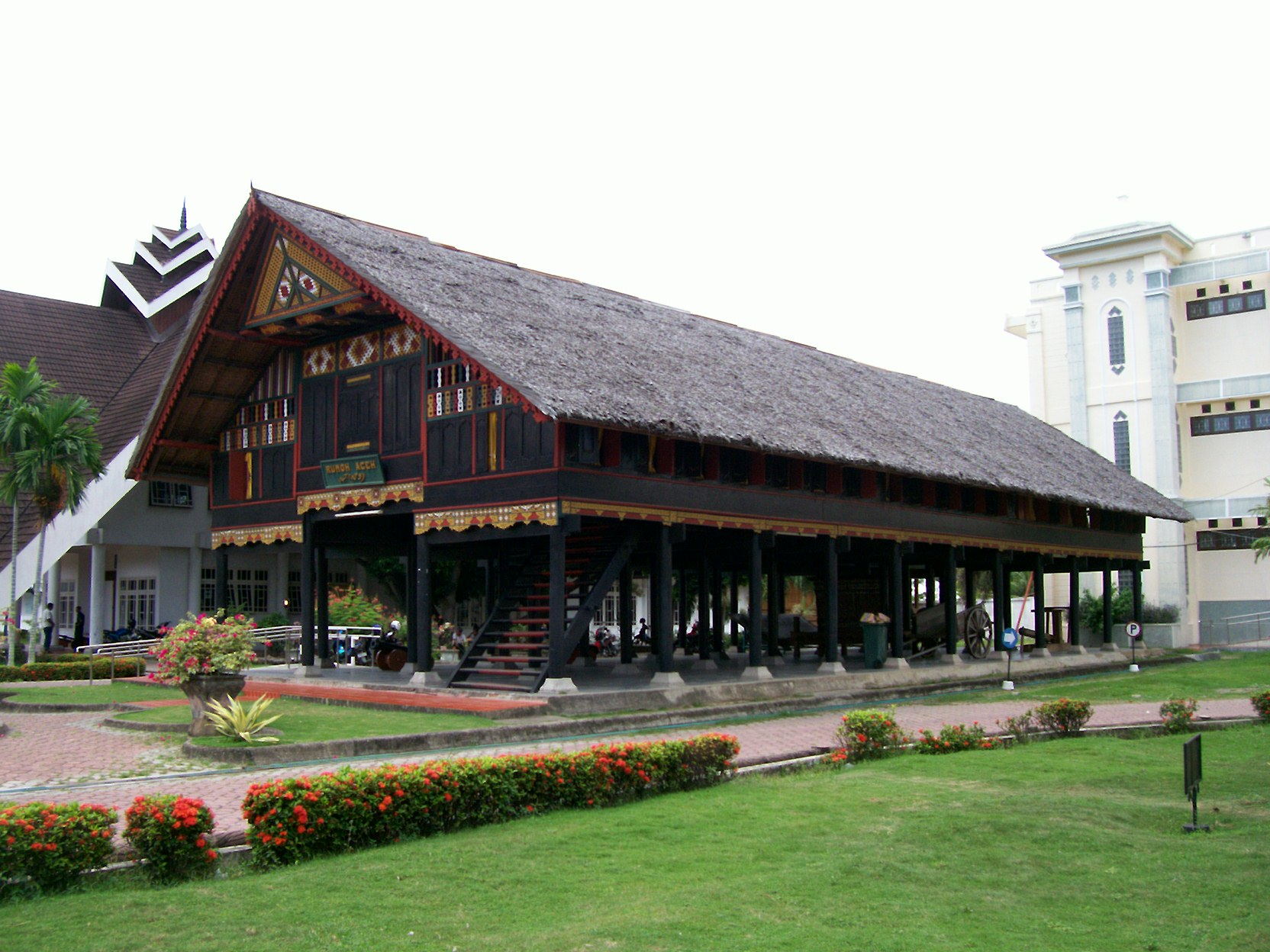
Aceh Museum featuring the traditional Rumoh Aceh, in the background is a modern interpretation of the Cakra Donya roof.

Unlike the traditional houses of the Balinese, the Rumoh Aceh is on the verge of extinction due to lack of the good timber required for their construction and their impracticality for modern lifestyle. The most reasonable reason is perhaps an interest in change: people living in traditional houses are associated with poverty, compared to the seemingly higher status of modern people living in modern houses.

Several Acehnese architects have attempted to modernize the traditional architecture of Aceh. One attempt is to replicate the roof canopy of the Cakra Donya bell (an ancient relic in Aceh) into the auditorium of the State Museum of Aceh. This reinterpretation of the Cakra Donya roof was completed by Wim Sutrisno, a local architect. The Cakra Donya roof style has become popular in Aceh and can be found decorating the gates to hotels or bus shelter roofs. The gable roof has also been reinterpreted in many buildings, often with double gable screens, complete with a protruding wooden screen.

== See also ==
- Rumah adat
- Aceh Museum
- Architecture of Sumatra
- Taman Mini Indonesia Indah
