= Schlieper =

Schlieper may refer to

- Ana Rosa Schlieper de Martínez Guerrero
- Carl Schlieper
- Carlos Schlieper
- Franz Schlieper
- Fritz Schlieper
- Schlieper Bay
