= F.J. Fuchs =

- Industry: Automobiles
- Founded: 1885; 140 years ago
- Founder: F.J. Fuchs, M. van Heusden
- Defunct: 1936
- Headquarters: Batavia, Dutch East Indies, Netherlands

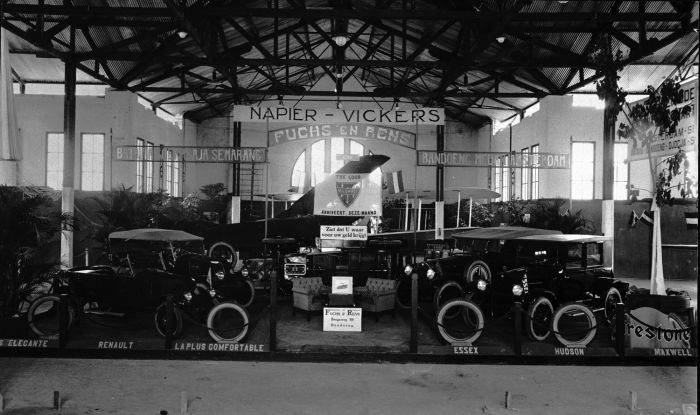
Napier (Napier & Son) - Vickers and Fuchs & Rens stand at the Trade Fair in Bandung showing cars and aeroplanes in the machine hall (1920s)

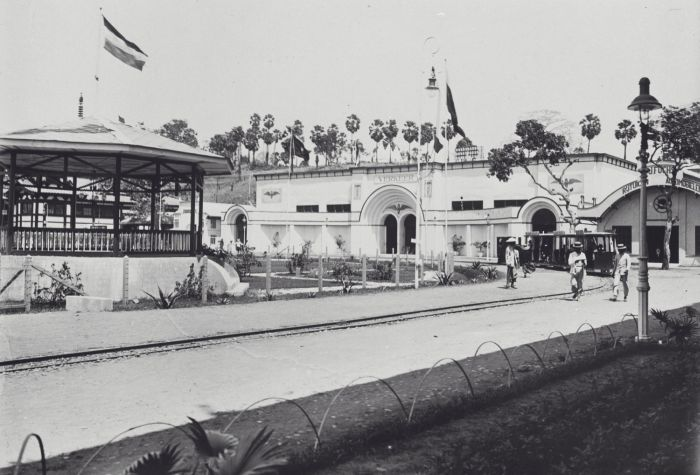
Bandstand and the pavilion of F.J. Fuchs at the Colonial Exhibition of Semarang in 1914

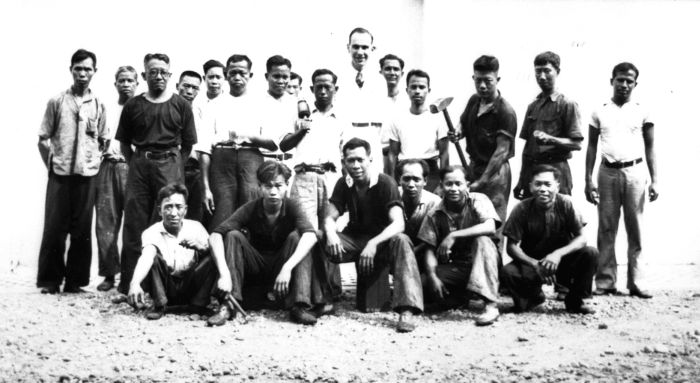
Portrait of a group of Fuchs en Rens employees in 1939

F.J. Fuchs was a harness, saddle, buggy, horse, carriage, tire and automobile supply business headquartered in Batavia, Dutch East Indies with shops and garages in various cities in Java and in Medan, Sumatra. The company became known as Fuchs en Rens. It rented and eventually sold horses, carriages, cattle and motor cars as well as offering maintenance and repair services at various garages and workshops. Fuchs & Rens was Batavia's main supplier of cars and tires and left a legacy of buildings in various Indonesian cities. Two of the company's three buildings in the western part of Tanah Abang (formerly Central Batavia) were demolished in the 21st century to make way for a restaurant.

== History ==
Fuchs established the business as a livery stable and farrier. The business expanded to offer carriage rental, carriage repair and carriage building as well as harness manufacture. Fuchs also began importing horses.

In 1885, Fuchs and M. van Heusden converted the business into a limited company. Fuchs retired in 1897 and was succeeded by Mr. J. W. Rens. After J. W. Rens retired in 1902 Mr. D. Rens, his brother, took over as managing director. Operations were expanded to include the sale of carriages and motor cars. The business also imported Australian cattle. In 1911 a branch office was opened in Sourabaya (Surabaya) near the Oranje Hotel and employed 200 people. In 1915, the D.D. Rens, Booheen Fuchs branches in Medan, Surabaya, Jakarta and Semarang were dealers of Hudson Automobiles. Fuchs en Rens (Fuchs and Rens) garages and a car dealererships included one in Surabaya on land purchased in 1910 at 3951 m2 at Jalan Tunjungan (Tunjungan Street) and was completed in 1913. The Fuchs en Rens shop on Braga Street in Bandung is part of a 1950s - 1960s photo. An early film from the Indonesian Film Center shows company sites and highlights of its offerings. One of several facilities of the company is a dealership with signage for Packard, Renault, Chrysler and White Motor Company.
