= Colonial Exhibition of Semarang =

1914 exhibition in the Dutch East Indies

1914 Semarang
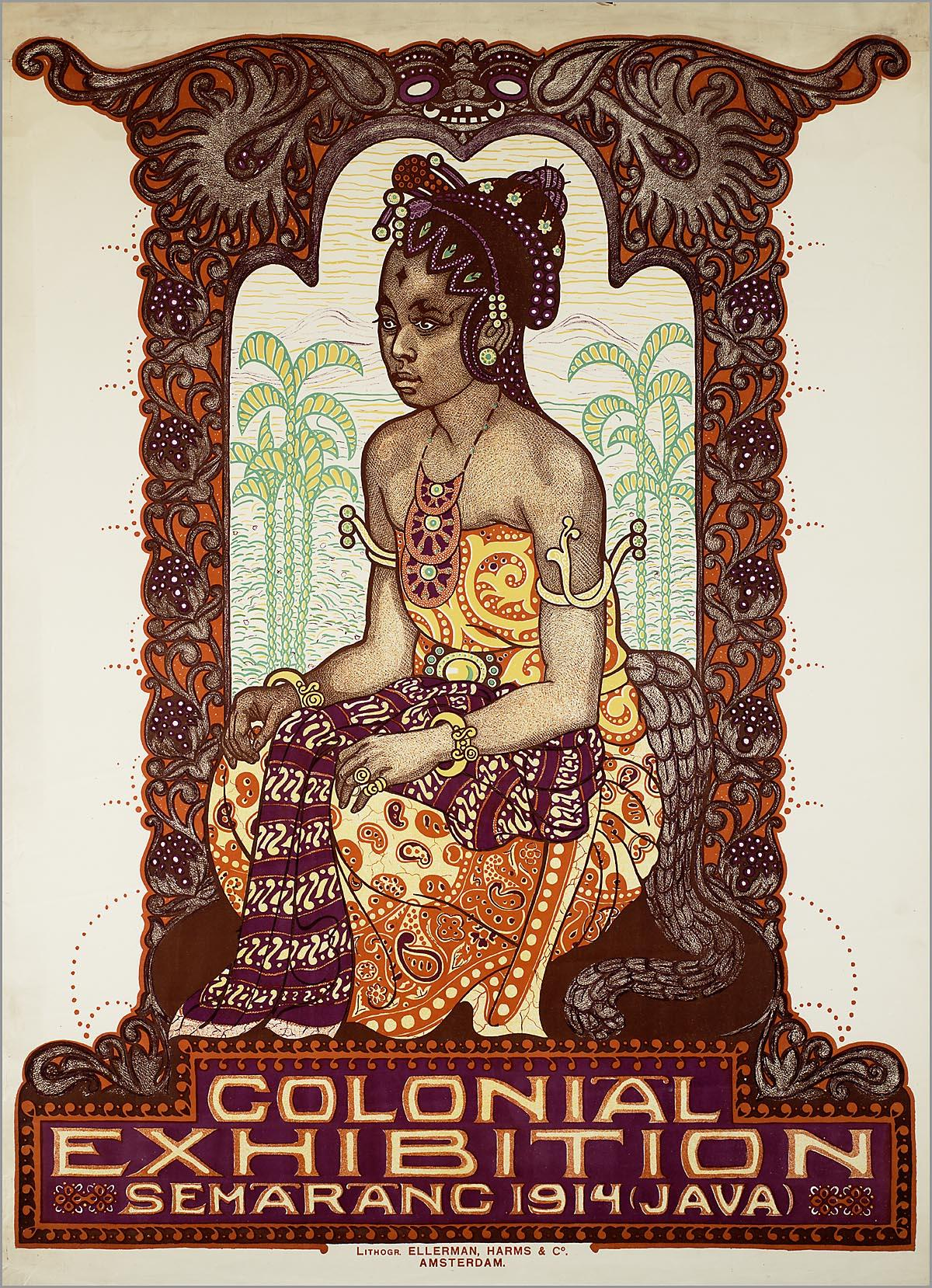
- Exhibition poster

Overview
- BIE-class: Unrecognized exposition
- Name: Colonial Exhibition
- Area: 26 ha
- Visitors: 677,266

Participant(s)
- Countries: 20

Location
- Country: Dutch East Indies (now Indonesia)
- City: Semarang
- Coordinates: 6°59′S 110°25′E

Timeline
- Opening: 20 August 1914
- Closure: 22 November 1914

The Colonial Exhibition, Dutch: Koloniale Tentoonstelling, took place in Semarang, Dutch East Indies (now Indonesia) on 20 August through 22 November 1914. Colonial exhibitions were trade expositions. It was designed to "give a comprehensive picture of the Dutch Indies in their present prosperous condition." It was the first large scale exposition in the Dutch East Indies, and financed by the participating corporations with a subsidy from the Dutch East Indies government.

The architect was Maclaine Pont.

== Exhibits ==
There were displays including companies, foreign states and areas within the Dutch East Indies. One area of the grounds had pavilions dedicated to cocoa, coffee, kapok, and tea.

=== Dutch East Indies ===
There was a Balinese, an Aceh pavilion central Java, and Semerang pavilions.

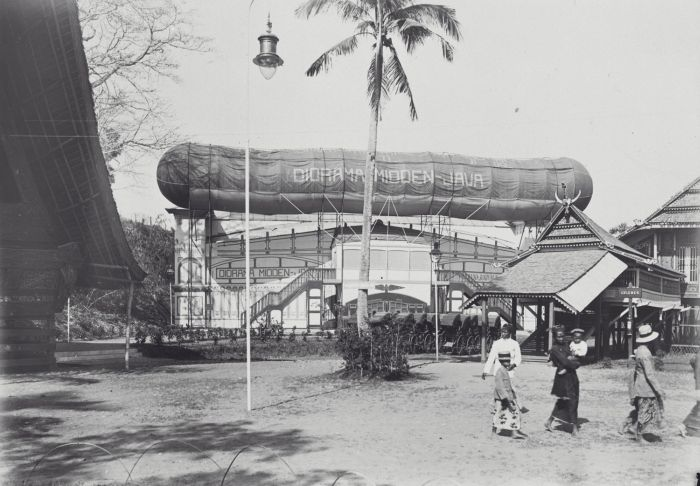
Central Java diorama

=== Foreign states ===
There were pavilions from Australia, China, Formosa (Taiwan) and Japan.

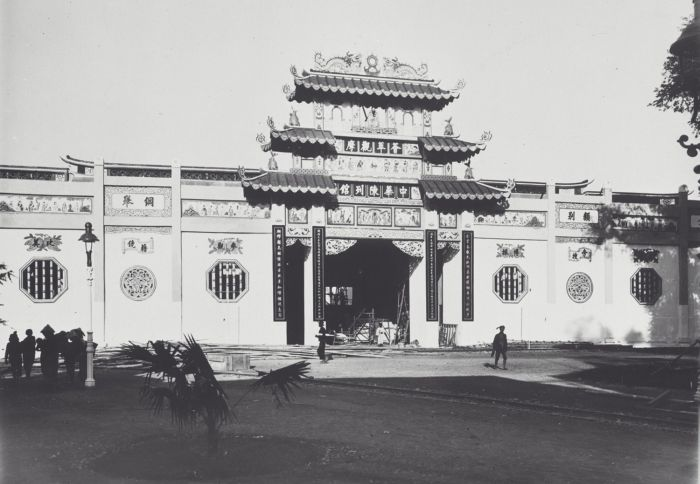
Chinese Pavilion

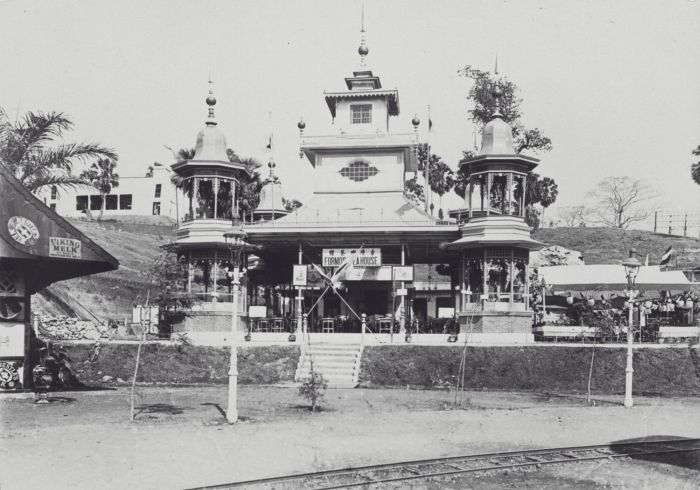
Formosa tea house

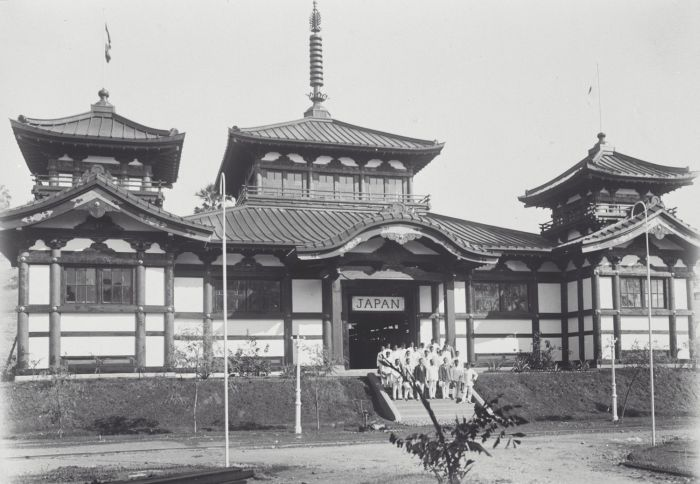
Japanese Pavilion

=== Companies ===
There were pavilions from several companies including German hardware manufacturing business Carl Schlieper, the Netherland Indies Gas Company (NIGM), Nestlé, and the Dutch shipping company Koninklijke Paketvaart-Maatschappij (KPM).

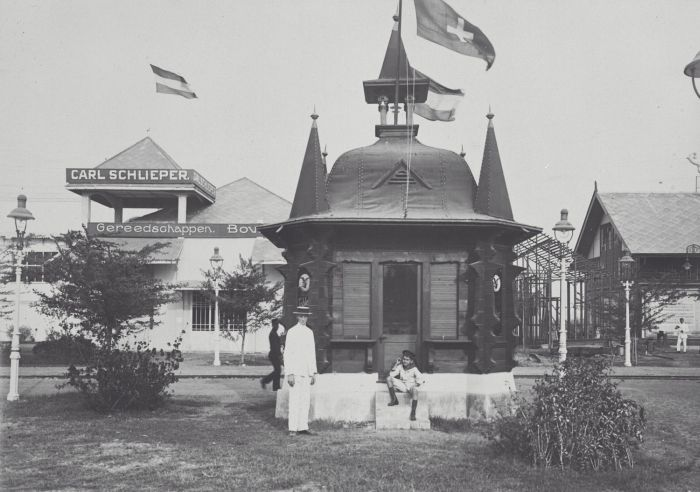
Carl Schlieper pavilion

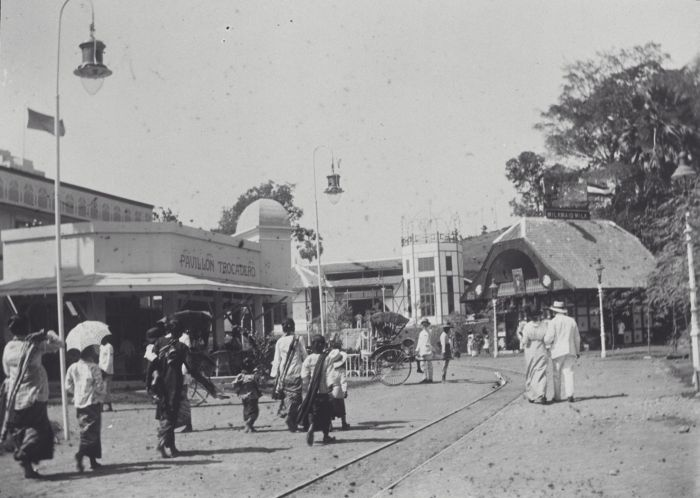
Trocadero pavilion (left), NIGM pavilion (center) and the Nestlé pavilion (right)

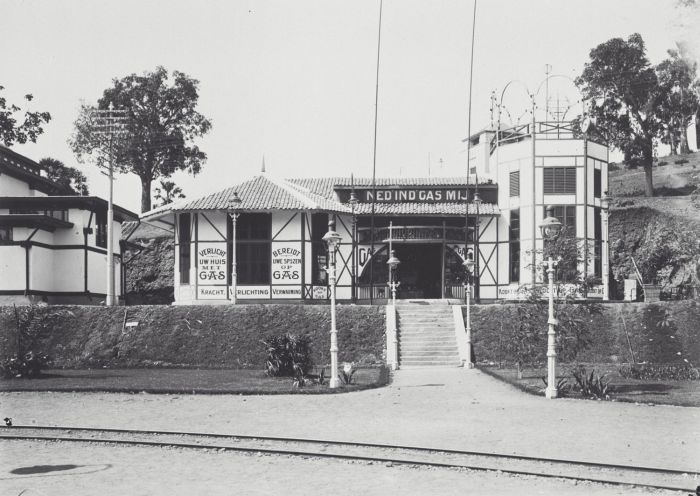
NIGM pavilion

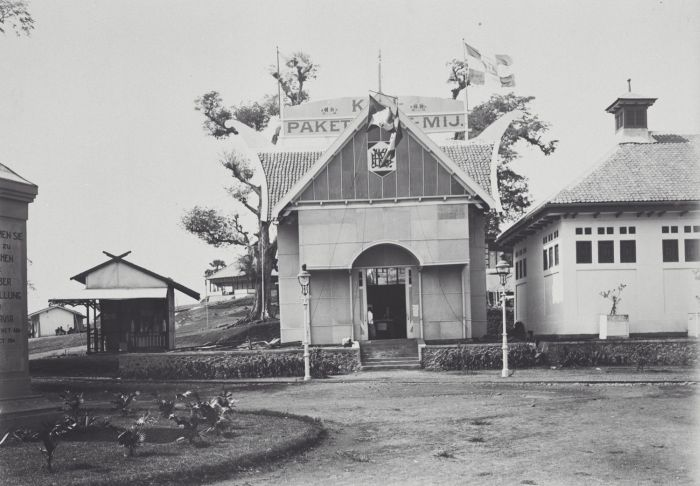
Koninklijke Paketvaart Maatschappij (KPM) pavilion

== Legacy ==
The Aceh state pavilion was built in Acehnese style, without nails.

After the exposition, it was dismounted and re-erected as the Aceh Museum, where it and the Cakra Donya Bell also displayed remain.

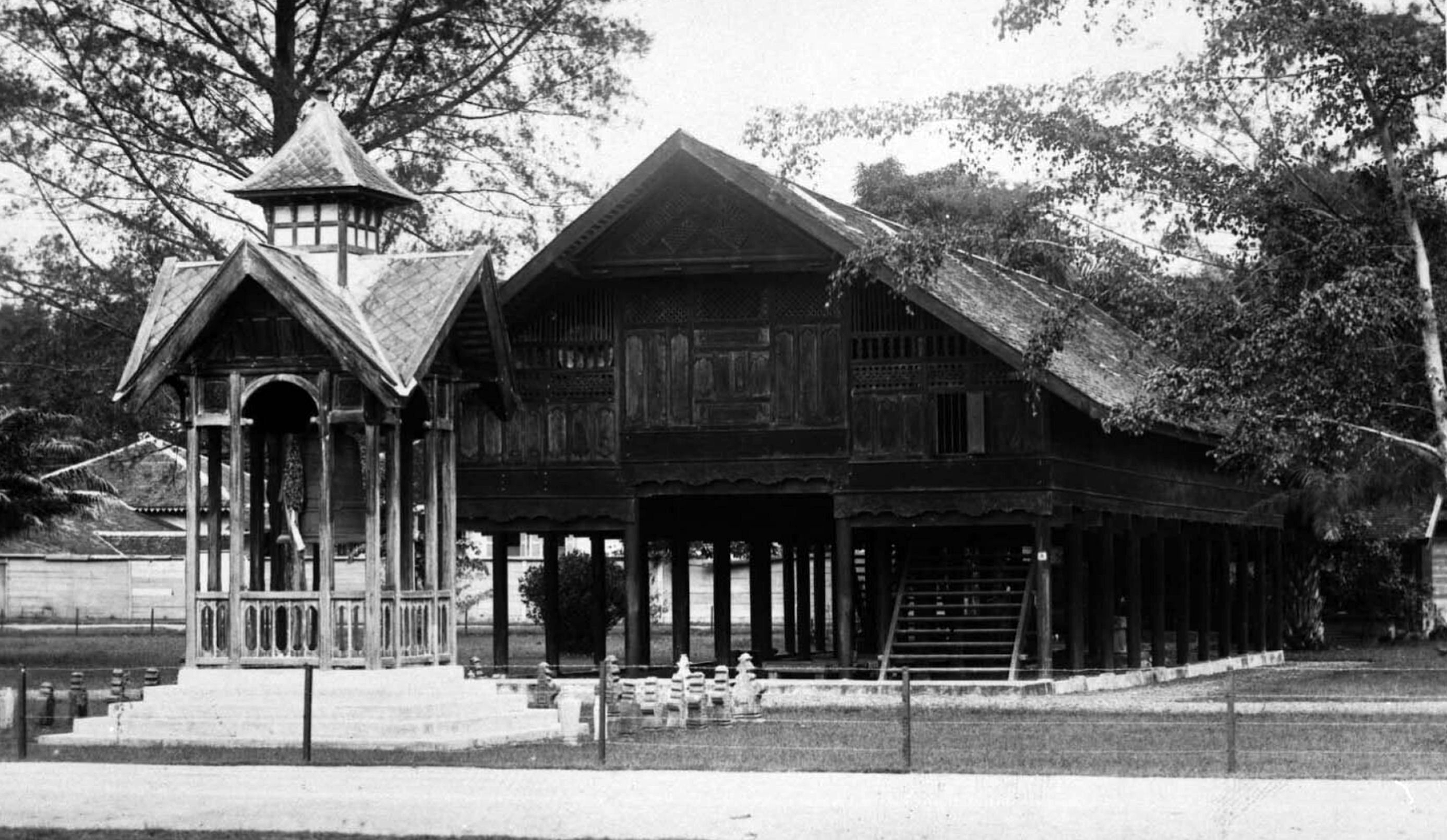
Aceh pavilion with Cakra bell during the exposition

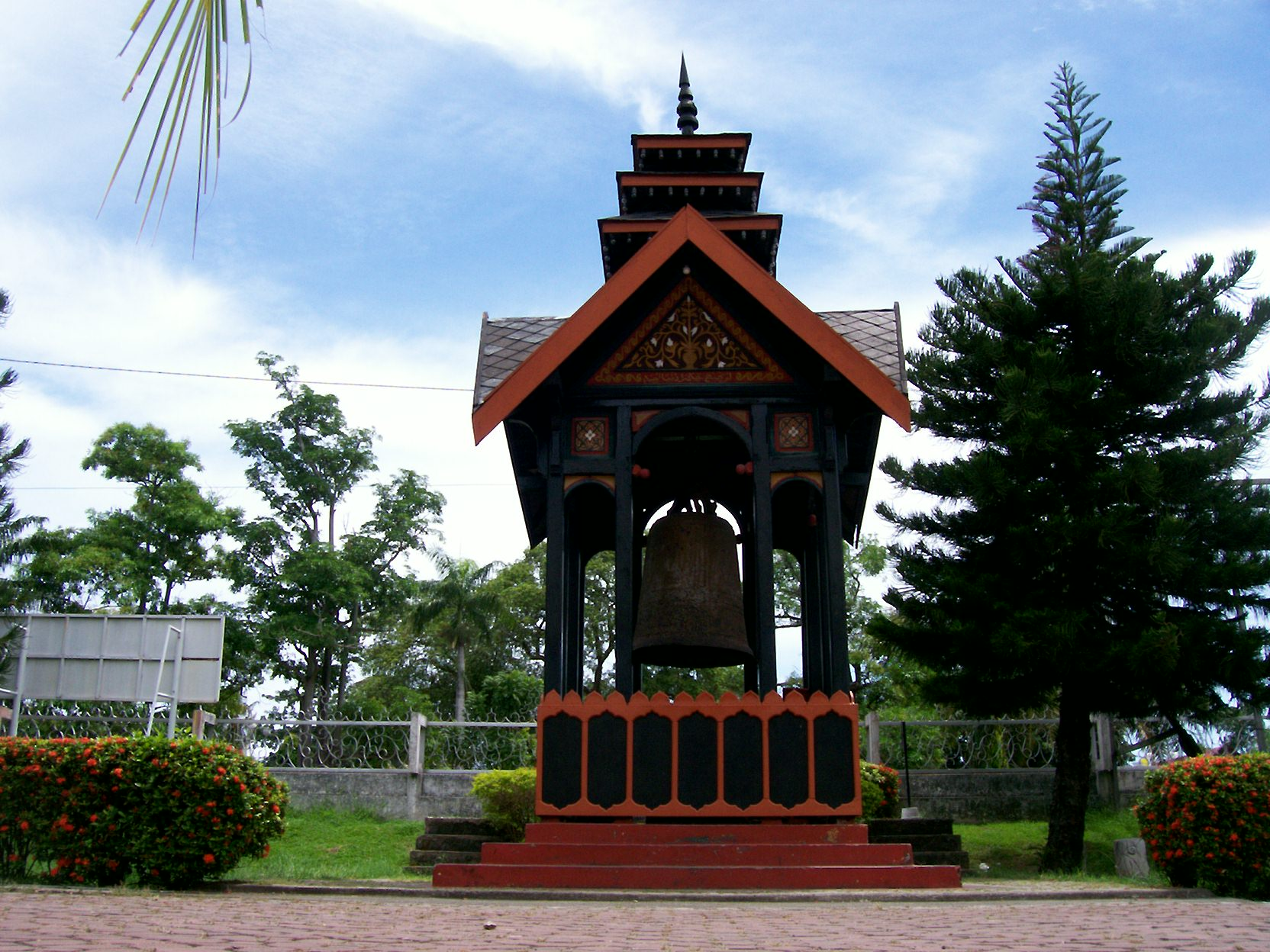
Cakra Donya bell in 2005

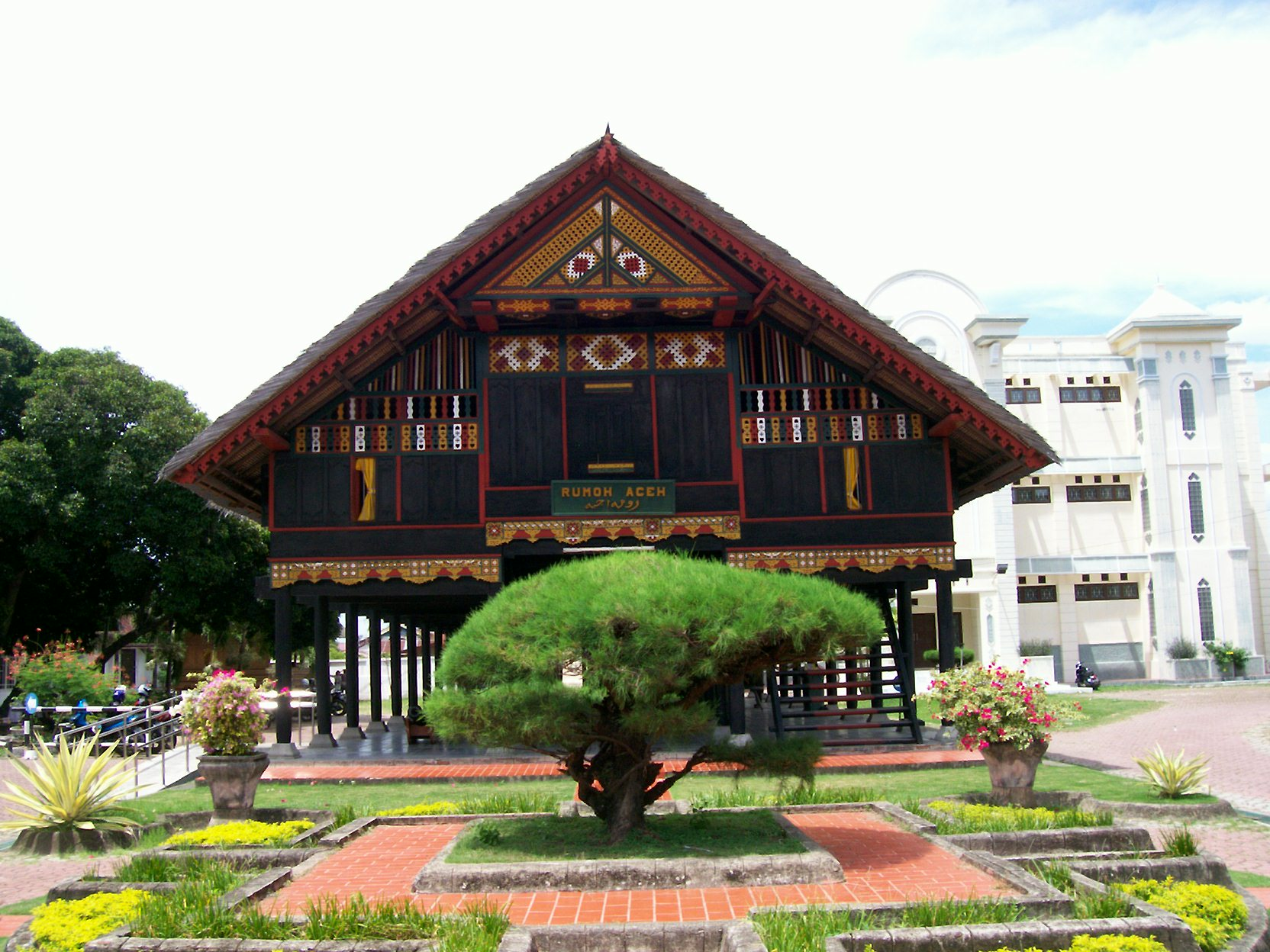
Pavilion building at the Aceh museum in 2005

== Gallery ==
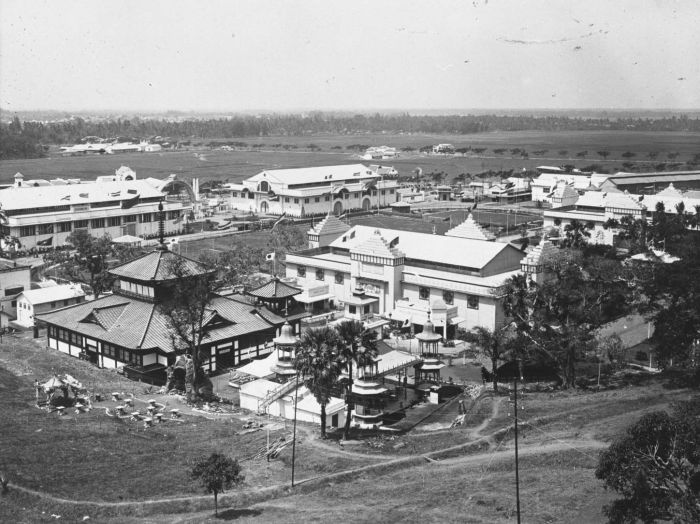
Aerial view of the colonial exhibition of Semarang

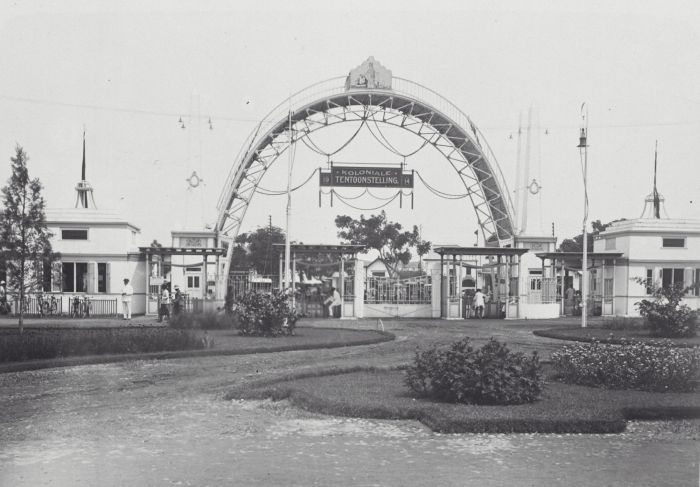
Main Entrance

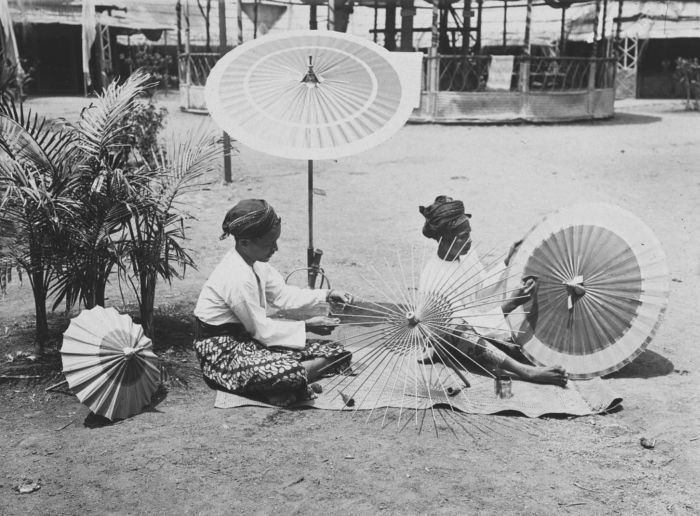
Umbrella manufacturing

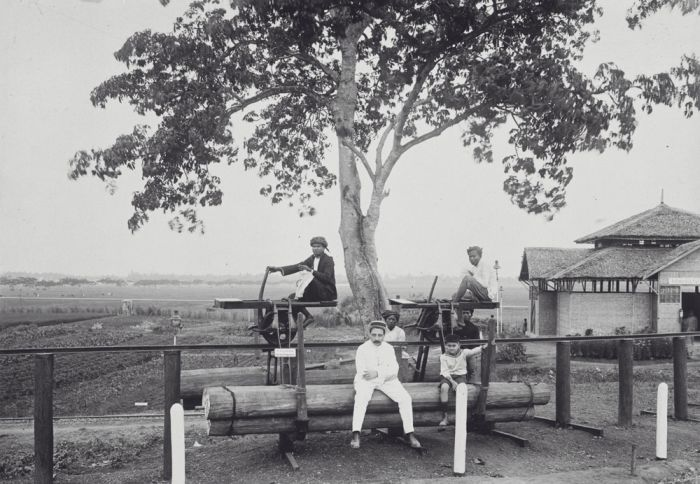
Rail transport demonstration from Krupp

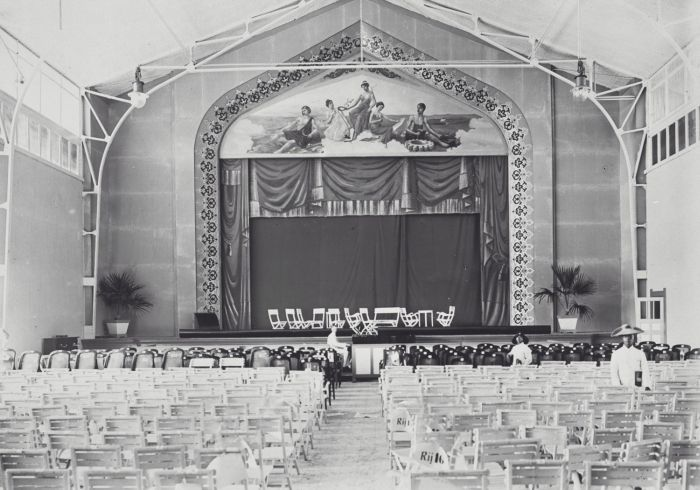
Stage

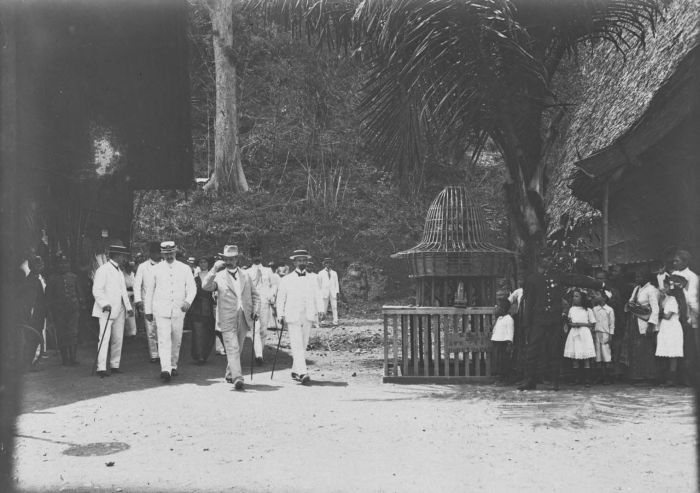
Visit of Governor General A.W.F. Idenburg to the exhibition

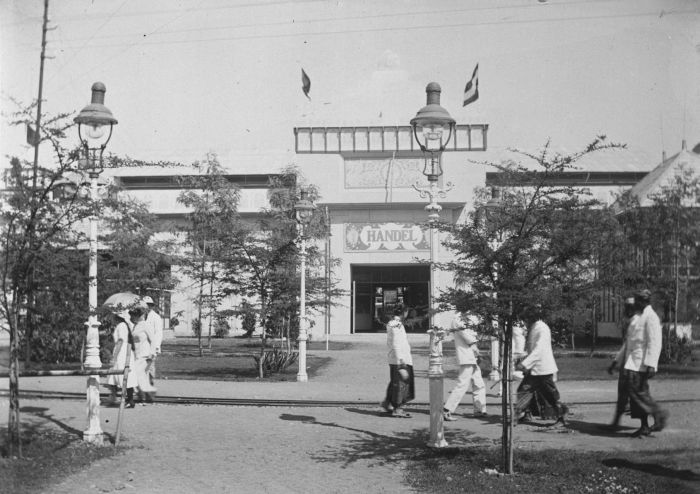
Trade pavilion

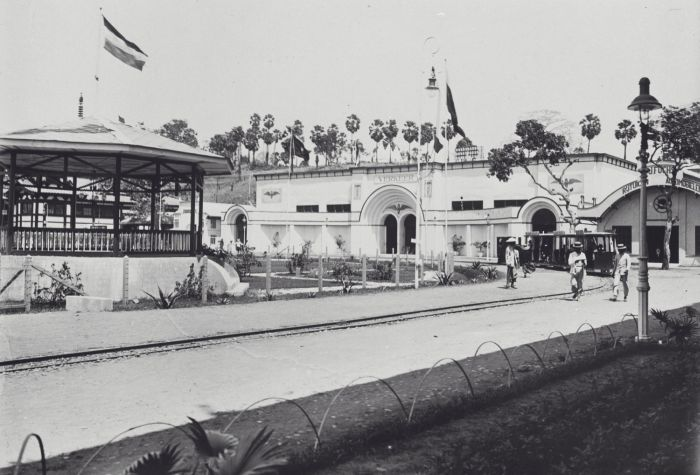
Bandstand Traffic Pavilion and the pavilion of F.J. Fuchs (a carriage supply and automobile distributor)

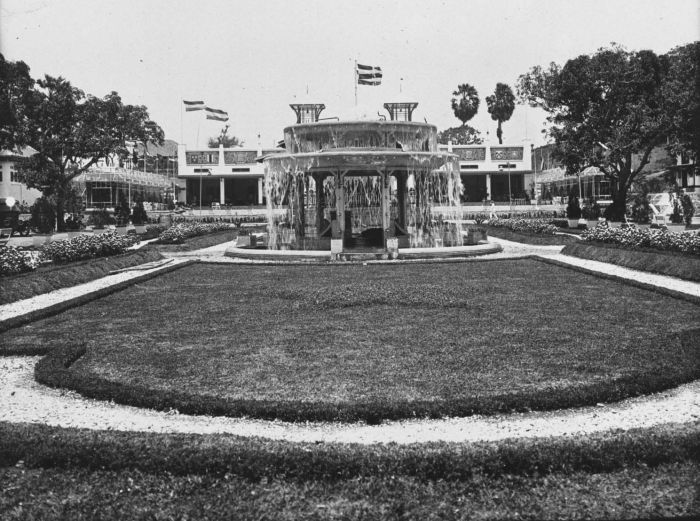
Fountain

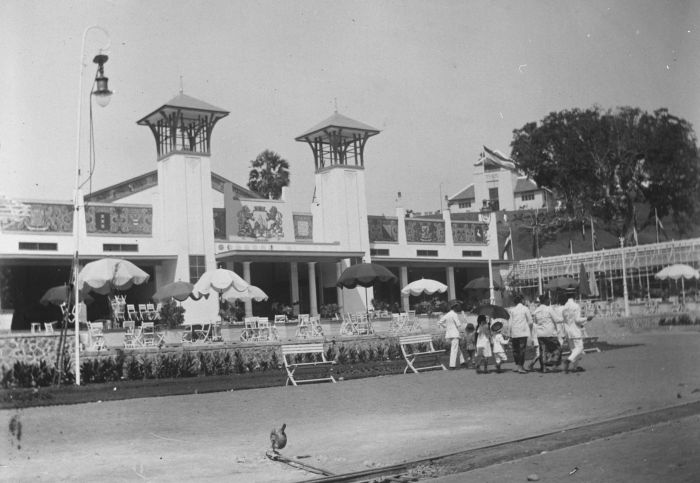
Party room and terrace
