= Aceh Museum =

Ethnographic museum in Aceh, Indonesia

- Museum Aceh
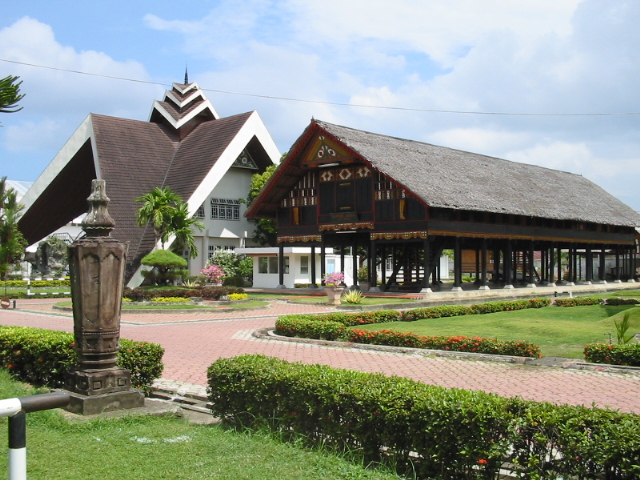
- Aceh Museum, which consists of the old traditional building (1914) and the new building (1974)

- Location in Aceh, Northern Sumatra, Sumatra and Indonesia Aceh Museum (Northern Sumatra) Aceh Museum (Sumatra) Aceh Museum (Indonesia)
- Established: August 31, 1915
- Location: Jalan Sultan Alaiddin Mahmudsyah, Banda Aceh 23241
- Coordinates: 5.548581°N 95.320642°E
- Type: Ethnographic museum
- Website: museum.acehprov.go.id

Aceh State Museum, popularly known as Aceh Museum or Banda Aceh Museum is a museum in Banda Aceh, Indonesia. It is one of the oldest museum in Indonesia.

== History ==
=== Colonial period ===
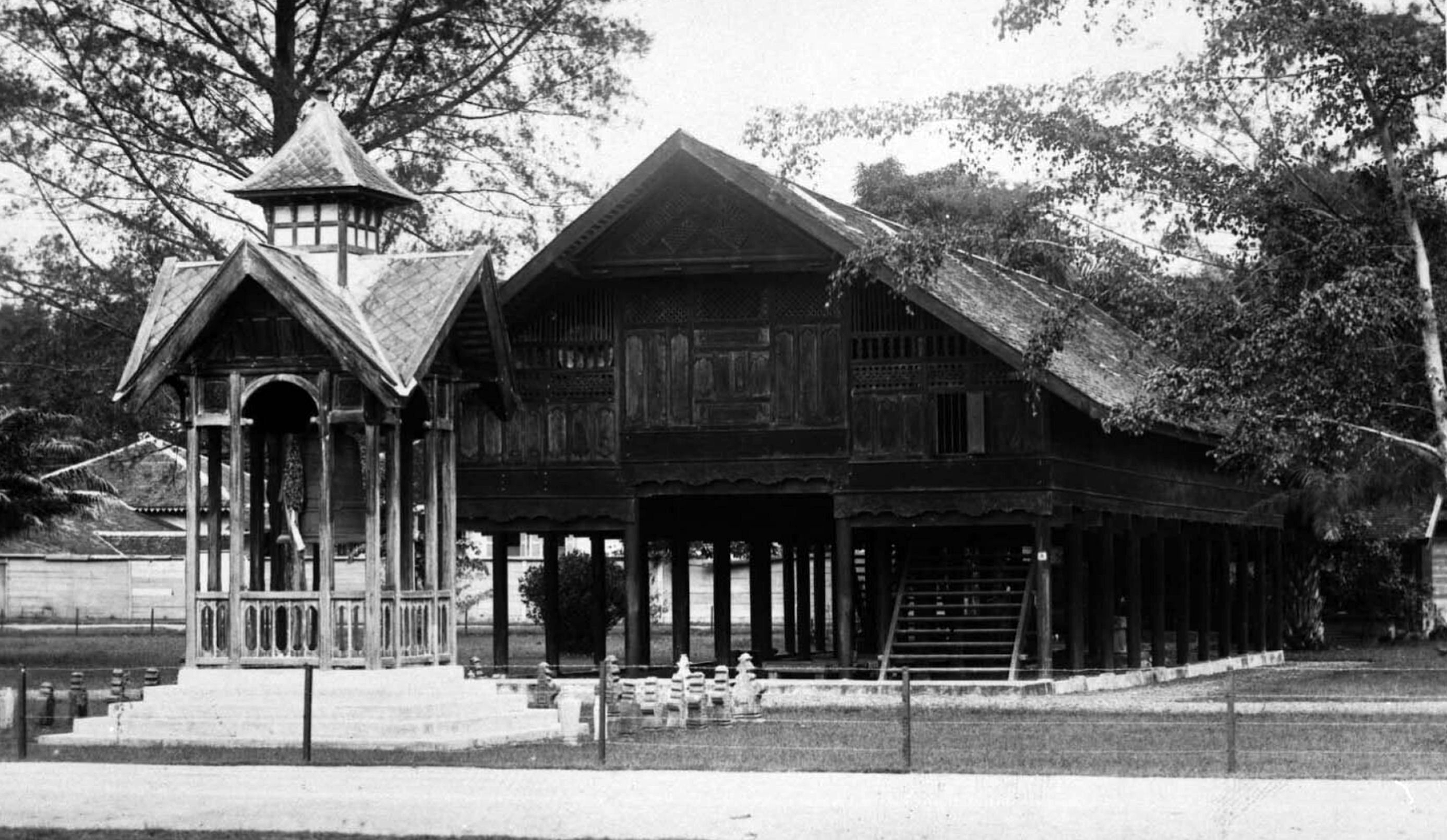
The Atjeh Museum during the early 20th century of colonial Koetaradja City

The original building of the Aceh Museum was in the form of a traditional Acehnese stage house (Acehnese Rumoh Aceh). This building was originally used as the Aceh Pavilion in the ground of De Koloniale Tentoonsteling (The Colonial Exhibition) in Semarang from August 13 to November 15, 1914. The original intention was that the stage house would be dismantled and moved to the Netherlands.

The pavilion showcased Acehnese artefacts, most of them are private collection of the ethnographer Friedrich Stammeshaus, which in 1915 became the first curator of the Museum of Aceh. During this exhibition, Aceh Pavilion managed to become the best pavilion. Because of this success, Stammeshaus proposed the Civic and Military Governor of Aceh, HNA. Swart, to bring the pavilion back to Aceh and used it as a museum.

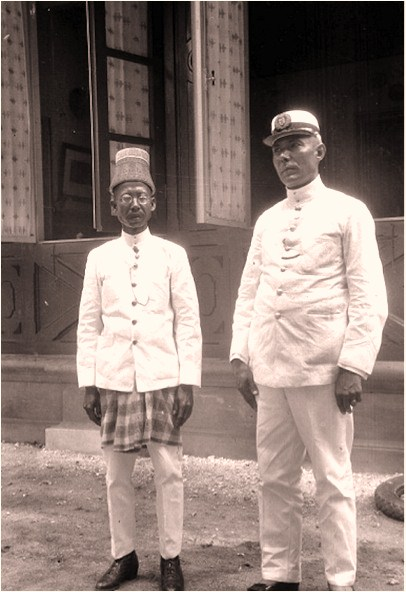
Friedrich Stammeshaus, the first curator of the Aceh Museum, seen here with Panglima Polem II.

The building was returned to Koetaradja (now Banda Aceh) in Aceh, and since August 31, 1915, it was officially opened on the Esplanade of Koetaradja with Stammeshaus as the first curator of the museum. Stammeshaus remained a curator of the museum until 1933.

After his retirement, Stammeshaus sold his personal collection of 1,300 ethnographic objects to the Colonial Institute in Amsterdam, now the Tropenmuseum. In this collection were many highlights of Aceh artefacts, including gold jewellery, Acehnese weapons, amulets, photographs and everyday utensils. The most famous sold to the Tropenmuseum is the personal coat of Teuku Umar.

=== Post-independence period ===
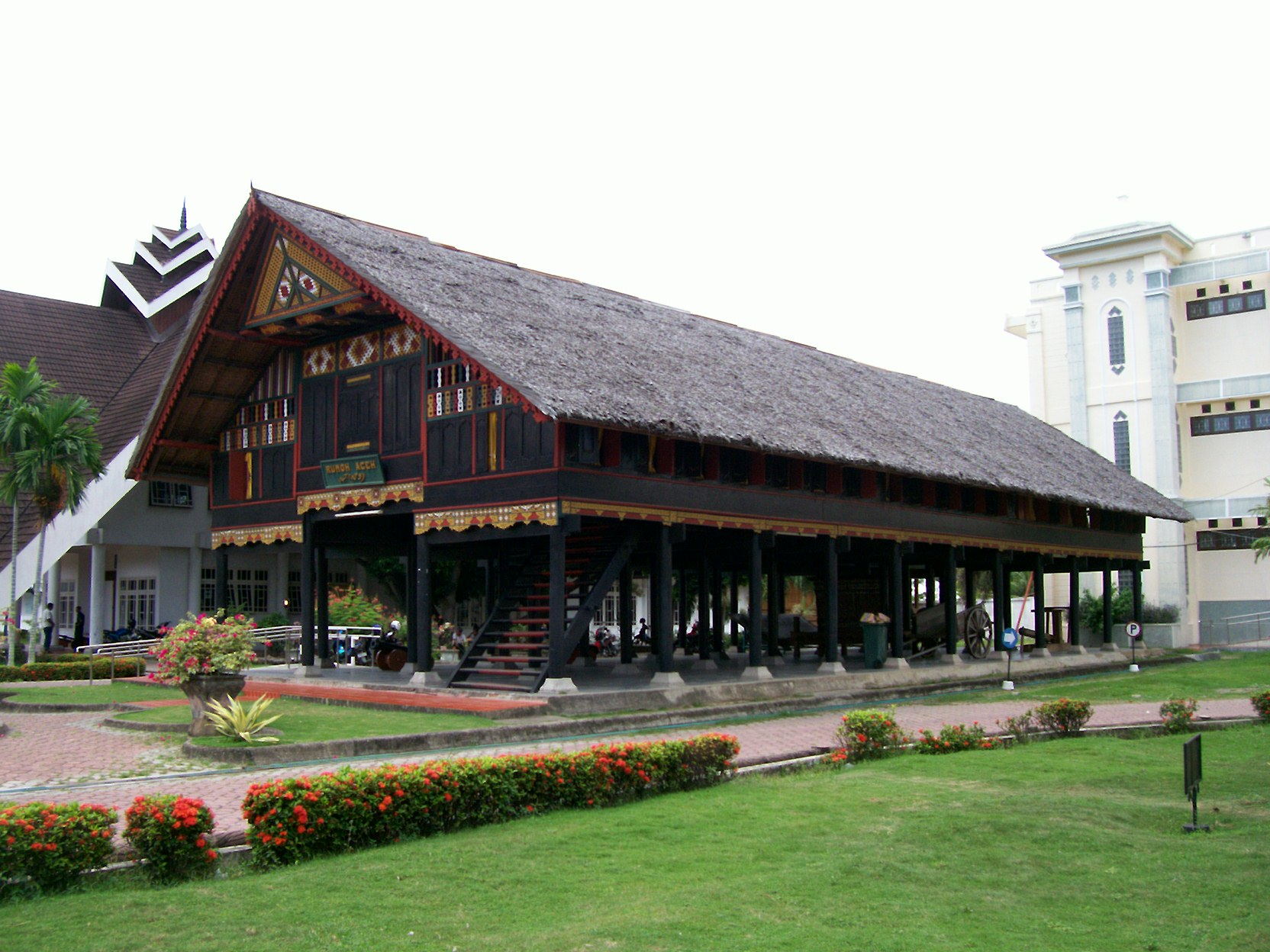
Acehnese traditional house

After the independence of Indonesia, the museum became the property of the Regional Government of Aceh. In 1969, under the initiative of Teuku Hamzah Bendahara, the Aceh Museum was moved from the old place (Blang Padang) to its present location in Jalan Sultan Alaidin Mahmudsyan on a 10,800 m2 land.

In 1974, the museum received a fund to rehabilitate the museum. The fund was used to restore the original pavilion building and to construct a new building for the museum complex. This new building contains room for permanent exhibition, a conference hall, a laboratory, a library, and an office. The fund was also used to add the collection for the museum and for related research.

On September 1, 1980, Aceh Museum was officially made a provincial museum under the name Aceh State Museum (Indonesian Museum Negeri Aceh). The official inauguration was made by the Minister of Education and Culture at that time, Dr. Daoed Yoesoef.

The historic Rumoh Aceh has survived from the 2004 earthquake and tsunami.

== Rumoh Aceh ==
The Rumoh Aceh is a typical Acehnese traditional stage house with wood as main material. The house contains three rooms, the front room (Ruang Depan), the middle room (Tungai) and the back room (Seuramo Likot). The middle room is about 50–75 cm higher than the back and front room.

== Collection ==
Some of the original collection of the Aceh Museum has been maintained by the Tropenmuseum in Amsterdam, some of the most famous of this is the personal coat of Teuku Umar.

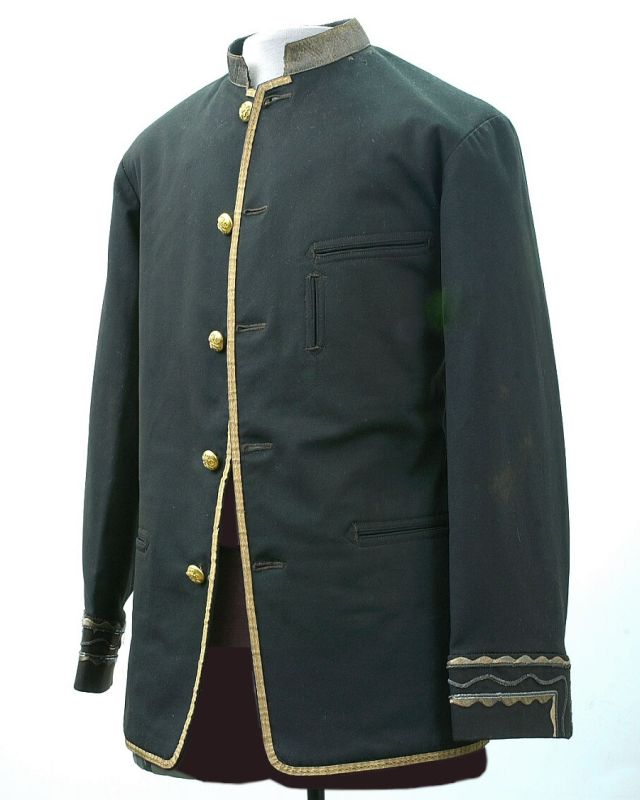
Personal coat of Teuku Umar, now kept in the Tropenmuseum.

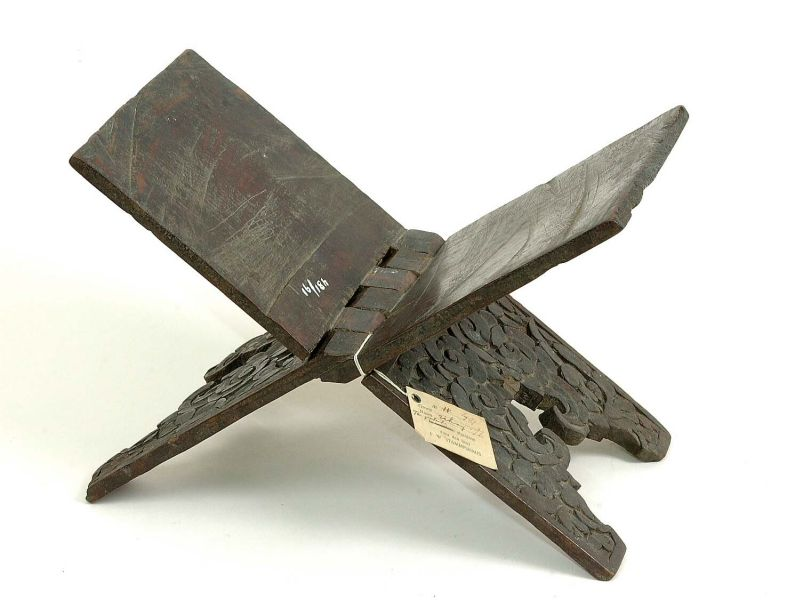
A wooden Qur'an stand from kampong Lam Koenjet, Koenjet, Lho Nga.

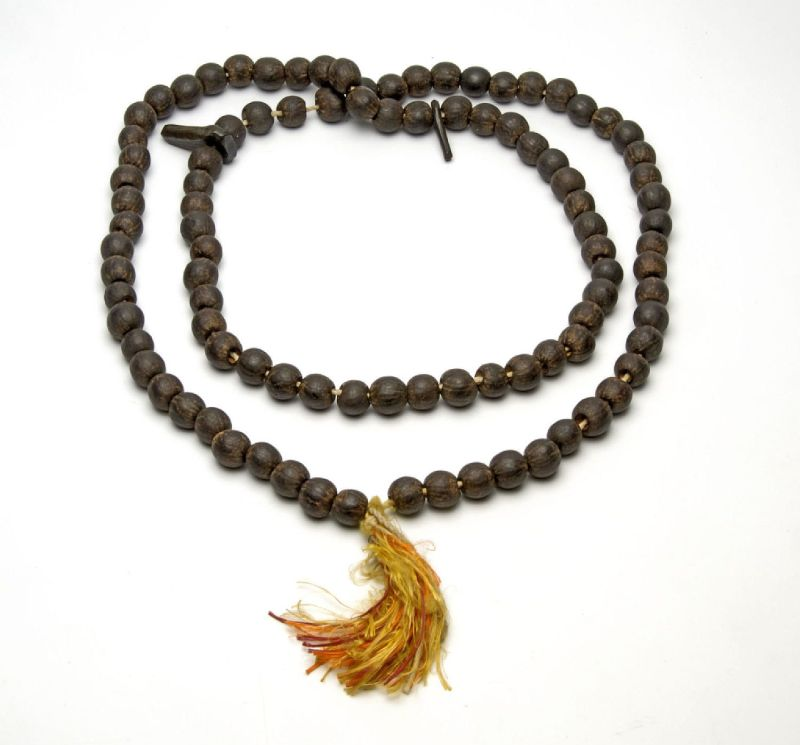
A wooden Islamic prayer beads from the mosque of Mon Mata, Lho Nga. This original collection of Aceh Museum is now kept in the Tropenmuseum, Amsterdam.

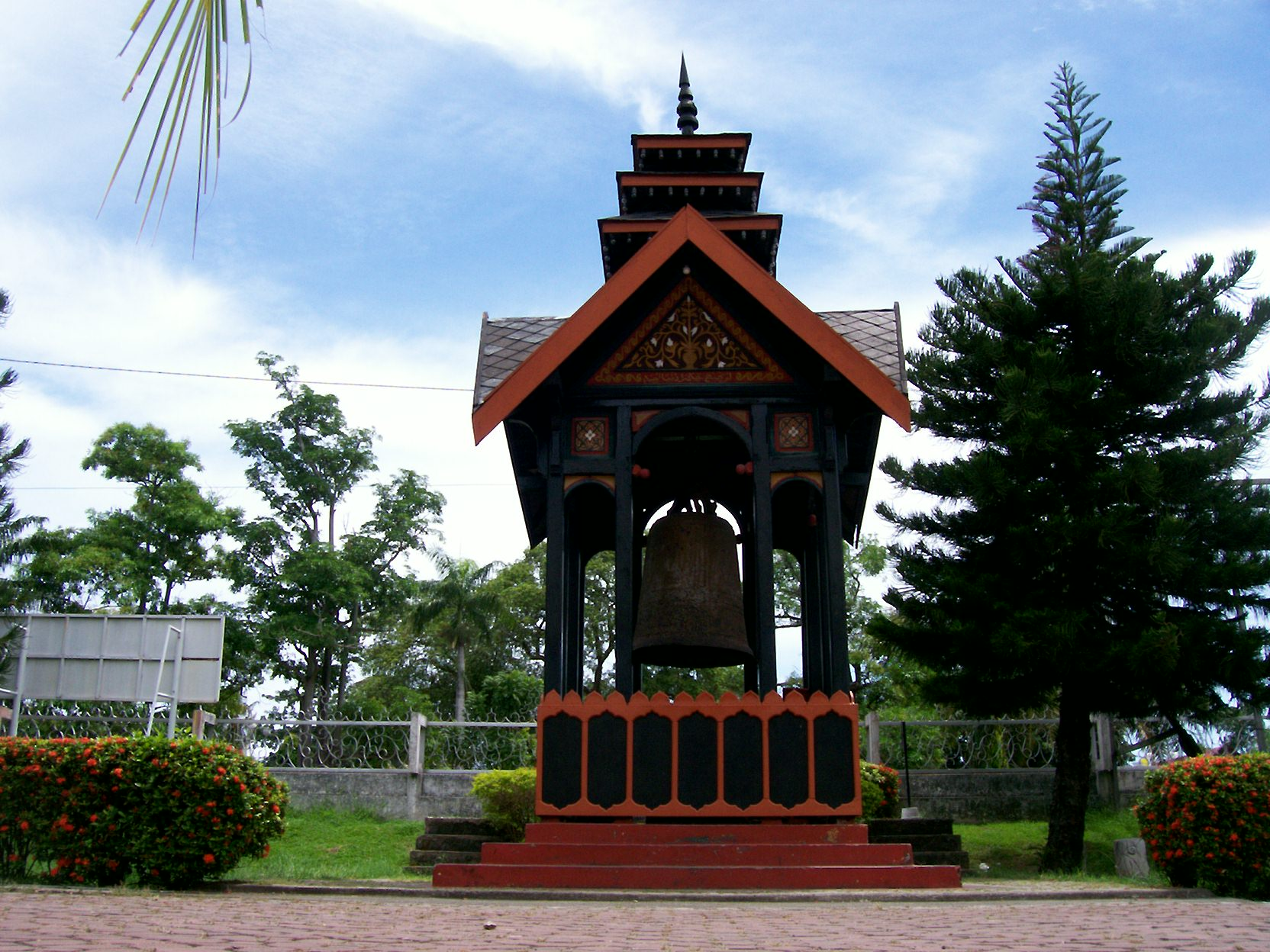
Cakra Donya Bell, the Sultanate of Aceh's bell.

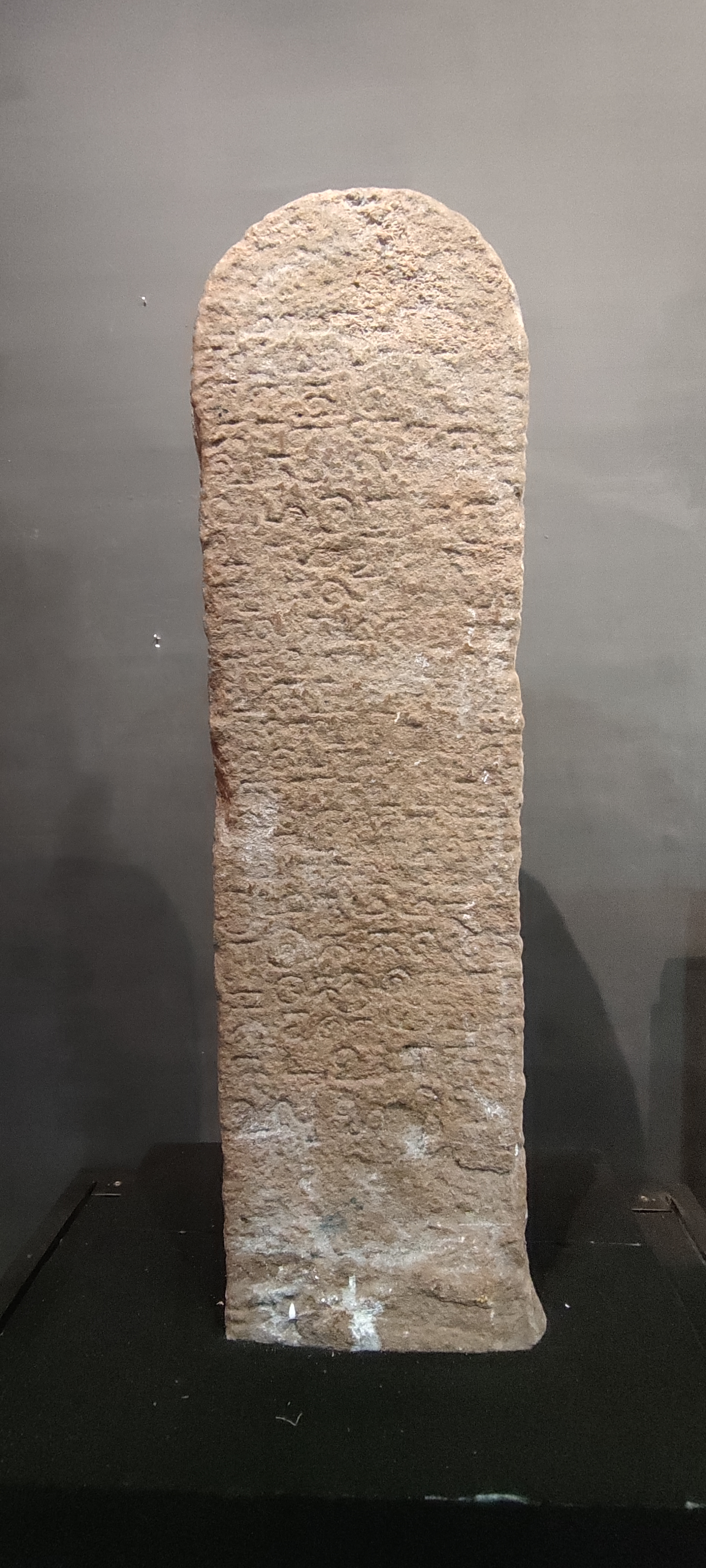
Neusu Inscription in Tamil language

Today the museum collects Acehnese related archaeological items, flora and fauna from Aceh, ethnographic items, old manuscripts, stones and minerals from the region, Acehnese ceramic, coins and seal from the kingdom of Aceh, and historic paintings.

== See also ==
- List of colonial buildings and structures in Jakarta
- List of museums and cultural institutions in Indonesia
