= Carl Schlieper =

German hardware manufacturing business

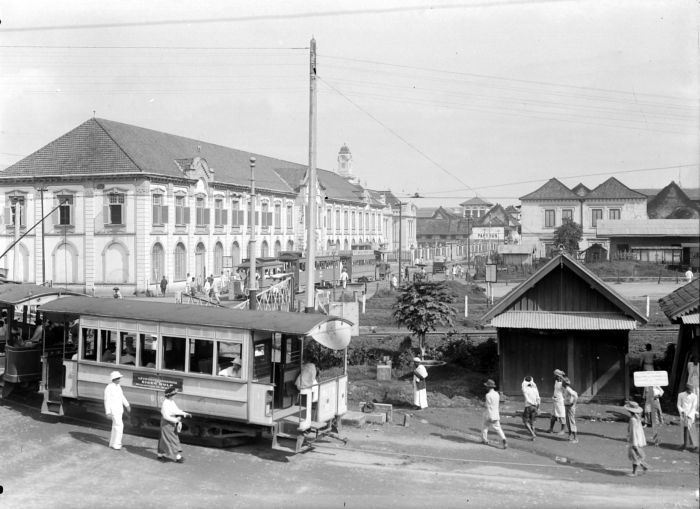
Ironworks factory of Carl Schlieper in background, Batavia, Dutch East Indies circa 1917

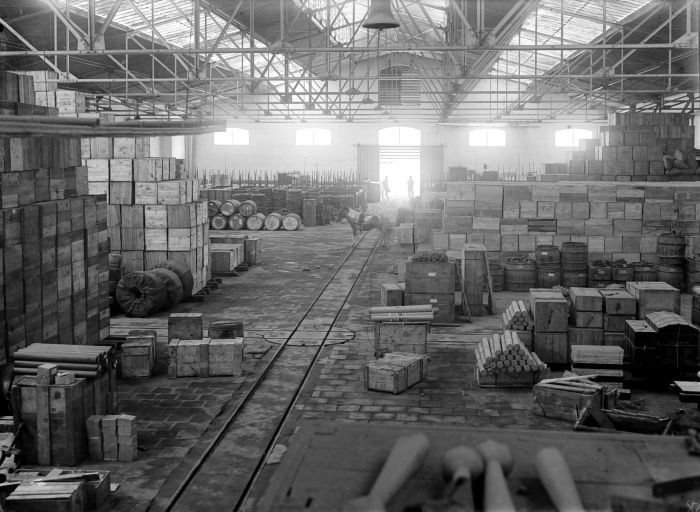
Carl Schlieper warehouse in Batavia

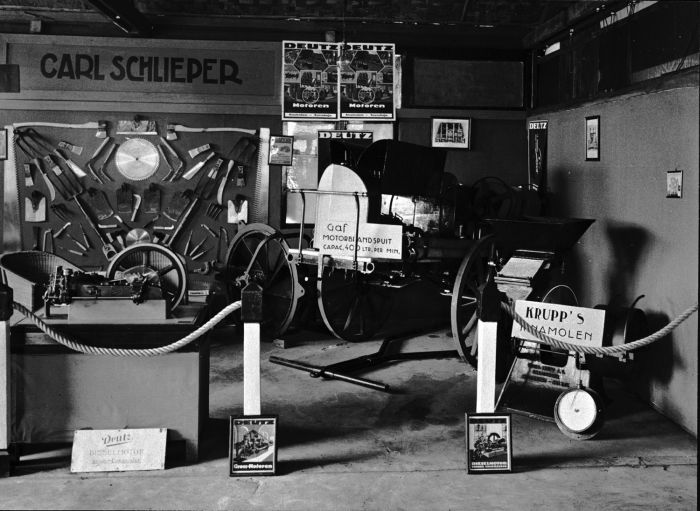
Carl Schlieper display (left) at a trade fair in Bandung along with Deutz AG display

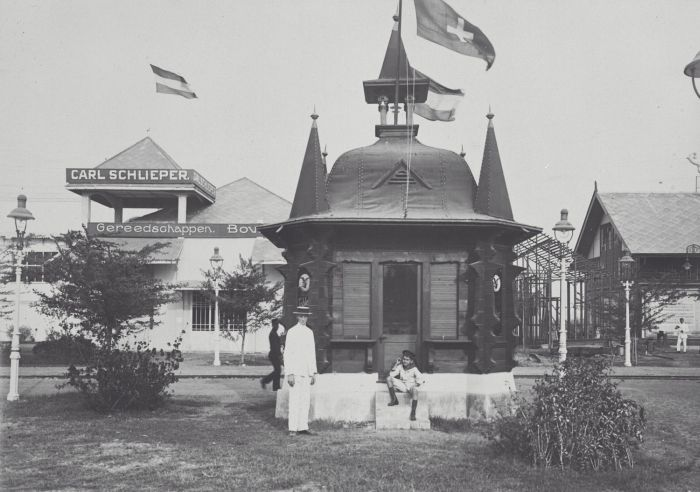
Carl Schlieper pavilion in the background on left at the Colonial Exhibition of Semarang (1914) with the "gereedschappen" (tools) sign also visible.

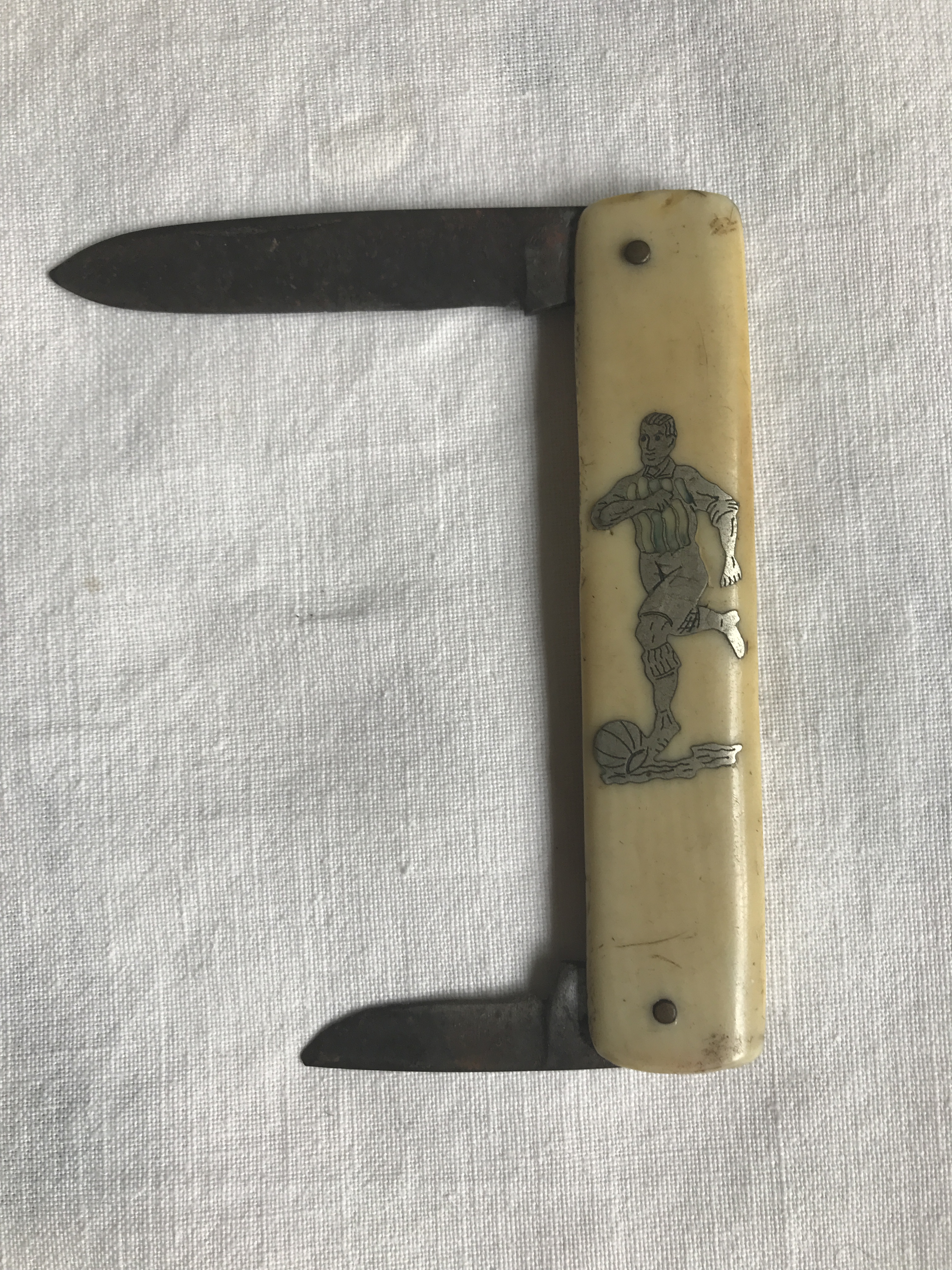
Footballer Penknife by C. Schlieper

Carl Schlieper was a German hardware manufacturing business established in Remscheid, Germany, in the 18th century. Products produced by the company include tools, steel safes, locks, charcoal, heavy machinery, bathroom fixtures, and coffee grinders. After World War II the business was scaled down to focus on cutlery.

The company operated in the Dutch East Indies and had pavilion at the Colonial Exhibition of Semarang in 1914. The company also operated in Batavia, Dutch East Indies, including as a supplier of hardware for the Engineering Corps. The company is known for its "Eye Brand" knives.

== History ==
Carl Schlieper Stahlwarenfabrik & Export was originally a trading company started in 1754 or 1798 and was based in Remscheid Germany. Products included knives, tools and straight razors. Markets included the booming tobacco and rubber plantation industry in Siam (Thailand), Malaysia, British North Borneo and the Dutch East Indies. A subsidiary of the company in Solingen dealt in knives including slipjoints, automatic knives, gardener, dagger, hunting knives, machete, bowie, razors, and kitchen knives. Various brand names have been used and 22 patents held by the company. In the U.S. brand names have included "Fan", "Jim Bowie" and "El Gallo" and, after World War II, the "eye brand". In 1989 Schlieper merged with Remscheider. Carl Schlieper was liquidated in bankruptcy in 1993. Production of the brand was resumed by Friedrich Olbertz in Solingen.

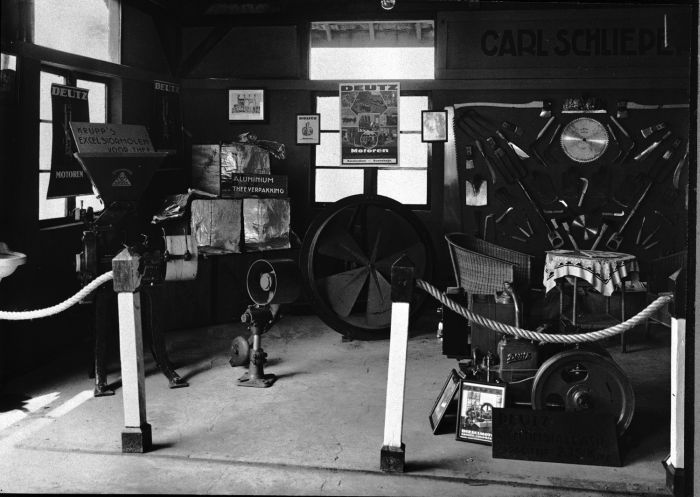
Deutz AG and Carl Schlieper display at a trade fair in Bandung
