= Cempaka =

Cempaka (Magnolia champaca) is a large flowering evergreen tree in the family Magnoliaceae.

Cempaka may also refer to:

== Places ==
- Cempaka Baru, Kemayoran, an administrative village in the Kemayoran district of Indonesia
- Cempaka Putih, a district of Central Jakarta, Indonesia
  - Cempaka Putih Barat, an administrative village in the Cempaka Putih district
  - Cempaka Putih Timur, an administrative village in the Cempaka Putih district

== Other uses ==
- Cempaka diamond mine, a diamond mine located in South Kalimantan, Borneo
- Cempaka LRT station, a Malaysian low-rise rapid transit station in Ampang Jaya, Selangor
- Cempaka Schools, a private school in Kuala Lumpur, Malaysia
- List of storms named Cempaka, a list of tropical cyclones named Cempaka

== See also ==
- Chempaka (disambiguation)
- Chempakaraman, Indian noble title
- Champak, Indian children's magazine
- Champak Jain, Indian film producer
- Champak Mehta (1907–1981), Indian cricketer
- Chempakaraman Pillai (1891–1934), Indian independence activist
