= Ita Martadinata Haryono =

Indonesian human rights activist (1981–1998)

- Born: Margaretha Martadinata Haryono; March 21, 1981; Sumur Batu, Kemayoran, Central Jakarta, Jakarta, Indonesia
- Died: October 9, 1998 (aged 17); Sumur Batu, Kemayoran, Central Jakarta, Jakarta, Indonesia
- Other name: Ita
- Occupations: student, activist
- Organization: Tim Relawan untuk Kemanusiaan
- Parents: Joko Leo Haryono (father); Wiwin Haryono (mother)

Margaretha Martadinata Haryono (March 21, 1981 – October 9, 1998), or Ita Martadinata Haryono, better known by her nickname, Ita, was a Chinese Indonesian human rights activist who was murdered in 1998, a case which is still unsolved.

== Early life ==
Ita Martadinata Haryono was born in Sumur Batu, Kemayoran, Central Jakarta, Jakarta, Indonesia on March 21, 1981, as the youngest child of the two children of businessman Joko Leo Haryono (born 1949) and human rights activist Wiwin Haryono.

== Background ==
At the age of 18 and while a senior year student in Paskalis Senior High School in Jakarta, Ita was found dead on October 9, 1998, in her bedroom in Sumur Batu, Kemayoran, Central Jakarta. Her stomach, chest, and right arm were stabbed ten times, while her neck was slashed and a wooden stick had been shoved inside her anus. The murder occurred just three days after a Jakarta press conference held by the human rights organizations that Ita had been involved with. The groups claimed that several of their members had received death threats in an attempt to stop them calling for an international investigation into the gang-rapes, murder, and burning of Indonesian Chinese girls and women during the May 1998 riot; a riot which ultimately forced Suharto to step down from the presidency.

== Death and aftermath ==
Police concluded that Ita's death was an ordinary crime, committed by a drug addict who had entered Ita's home to rob it. According to the police statement, he was caught in the act by Ita and therefore decided to kill her. However, others question this statement because Ita and her mother, Wiwin Haryono, were due to leave in a few days for the United States together with four victims of the May 1998 riot to present their testimony before the U.S. Congress. Ita and her mother had been deeply involved in giving help and counseling to the victims of the riot.

The group Ita and her mother had worked most closely with, an organization called Tim Relawan untuk Kemanusiaan (Voluntary Team for Humanity), concluded that Ita's murder was a warning to them and others who were involved in this humanitarian effort, to discontinue their activities.

== See also ==
- List of unsolved murders (1980–1999)
- Widji Thukul
