= Rajawali railway station =

Railway station in Indonesia

C06 Rajawali Station Stasiun Rajawali
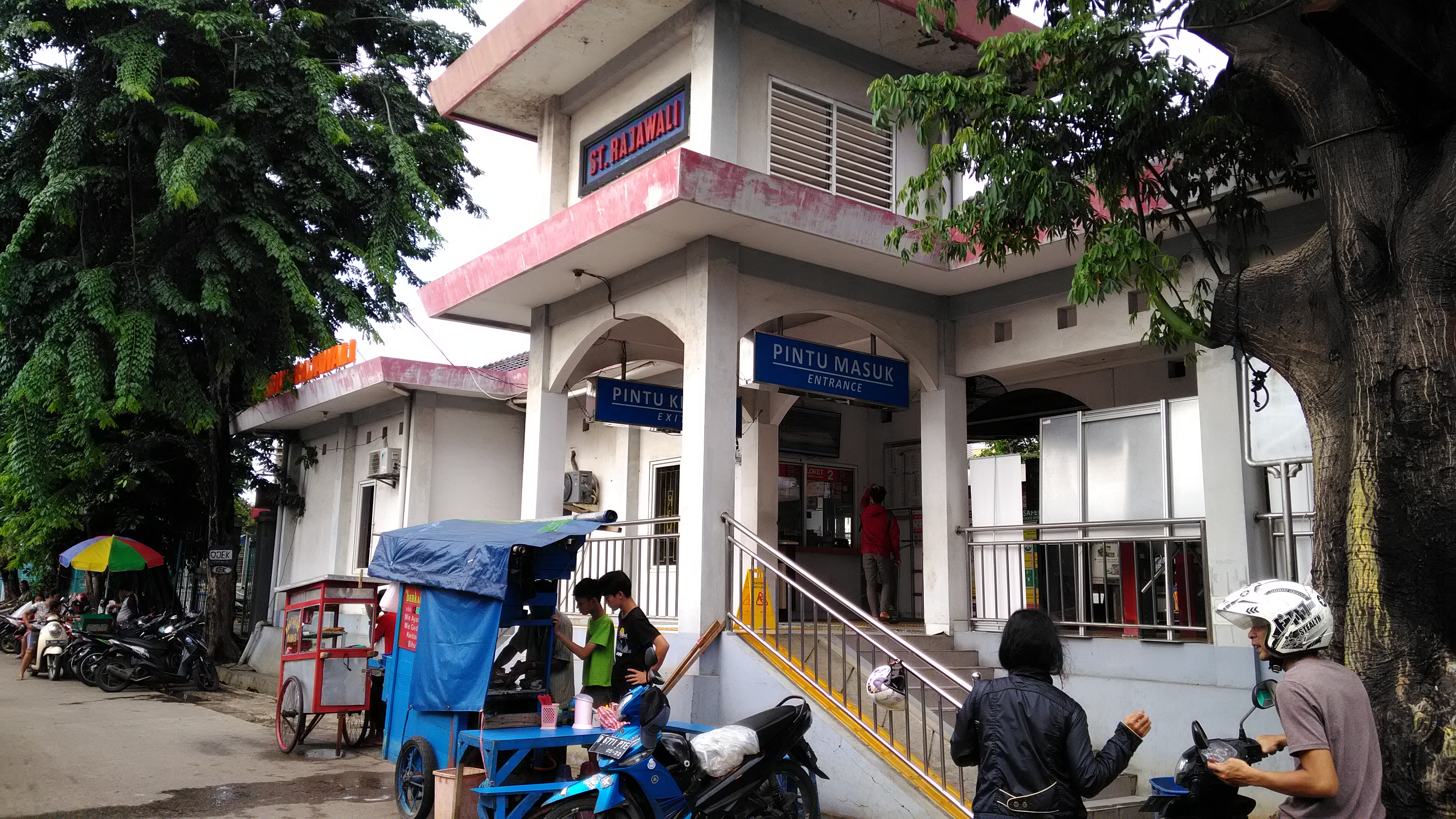
- Rajawali Station

General information
- Location: Jl. Industri No. 1, North Gunung Sahari, Sawah Besar, Central Jakarta; Jakarta; Indonesia
- Coordinates: 6.14505°S 106.836698°E
- Elevation: +4 m (13 ft)
- Owner: Kereta Api Indonesia
- Operator: KAI Commuter
- Lines: Rajawali–Cikampek railway; Cikarang Loop Line
- Platforms: 1 island platform 2 side platforms
- Tracks: 4

Construction
- Structure type: Ground
- Parking: Available
- Accessible: Available

Other information
- Station code: RJW • 0459
- Classification: Class III

History
- Former names: Pisangbatu

Services
Preceding station		Following station
Kampung Bandan towards Kampung Bandan or Jakarta Kota	Commuter Line Cikarang	Kemayoran towards Bekasi or Cikarang via Pasar Senen
Location
- Location within Jakarta

Rajawali Station (RJW) is a class III railway station located on North Gunung Sahari, Sawah Besar, Central Jakarta. The station, which is located at an altitude of +4 m (13 ft), is included in the Operation Area I Jakarta. This station has four tracks and only serves the KRL Commuterline.

== Building and layout ==
This island platform station has four rail lines without railroad switch. The four lanes are a confluence of a pair of double lanes from the northwest (Kampung Bandan–Jakarta Kota/Angke) and northeast (Tanjung Priok). From there, all routes move south towards Jatinegara. The path to Kemayoran Station is a double track. The rail line to Tanjung Priok is now clean from any illegal settlements, unlike in previous years. Although the route to Tanjung Priok is facilitated by the overhead line cable, this line does not serve KRL Commuterline trains and only serves Container Train trips to and from Tanjung Priuk Station or Pasoso Station.

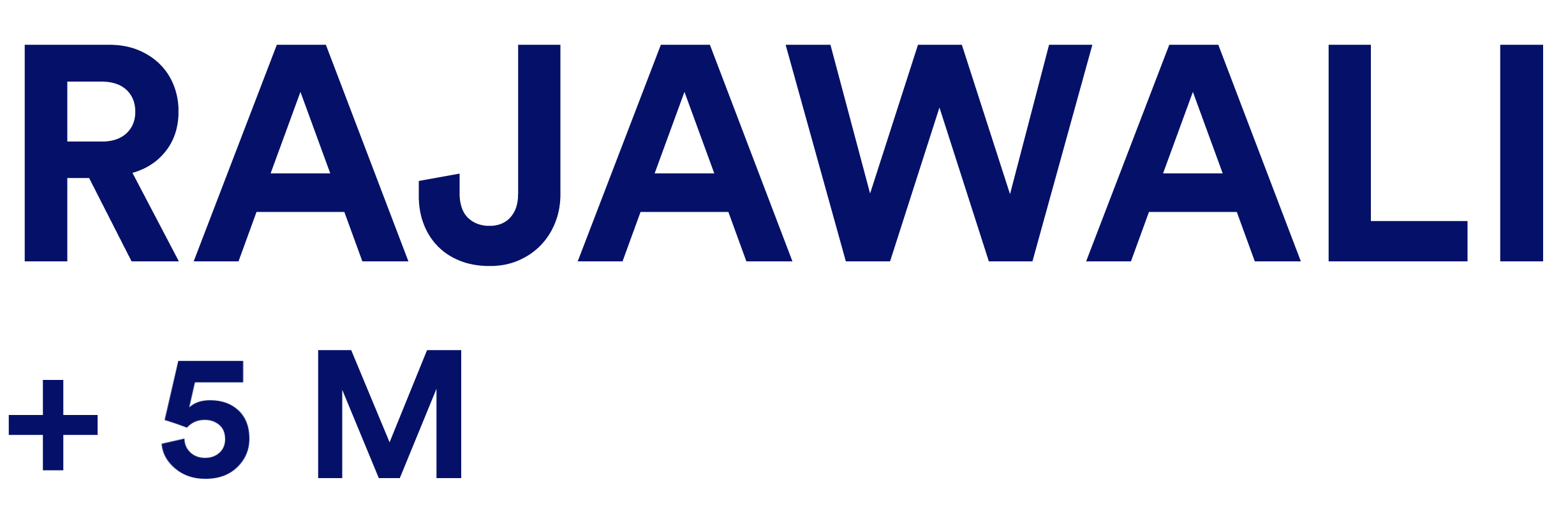
C06
P Platform floor	Line 4	Straight line to Ancol
P Platform floor	Line 3	Straight line from Pasar Senen
P Platform floor	Side platform, the doors are opened on the right side
P Platform floor	Line 2	← (Kampung Bandan) Cikarang Loop Line (counterclockwise loop) towards Kampung Bandan
P Platform floor	Line 1	Cikarang Loop Line (clockwise loop) to Cikarang (Kemayoran) →
P Platform floor	Side platform, the doors are opened on the right side
P Platform floor	G	Main building

== Services ==
The following is a list of train services at the Rajawali Station.

=== Passenger services ===
- KAI Commuter
  - Cikarang Loop Line (Full Racket)
    - to Cikarang (counter-clockwise via Tanah Abang and Manggarai)
    - to Cikarang (clockwise via Kemayoran)

== Supporting transportation ==
Public transport type	Line	Destination
TransJakarta	JAK 33 (Mikrotrans Jak Lingko)	Jakarta Kota Station-Pulo Gadung Terminal (via Mangga Dua Raya-Utan Panjang Timur-Letjen Suprapto)
Mikrolet	M53	Jakarta Kota Station-Pulo Gadung Terminal (via Mangga Dua Raya-Utan Panjang Timur - Letjen Suprapto)

Preceding station	Kereta Api Indonesia	Following station
Ancol; Terminus	Jakarta Railway; AC–RJW	Terminus
Terminus	Rajawali–Cikampek	Kemayoran towards Cikampek
