= Kemayoran railway station =

Railway station in Indonesia

C05 Kemayoran Station Stasiun Kemayoran
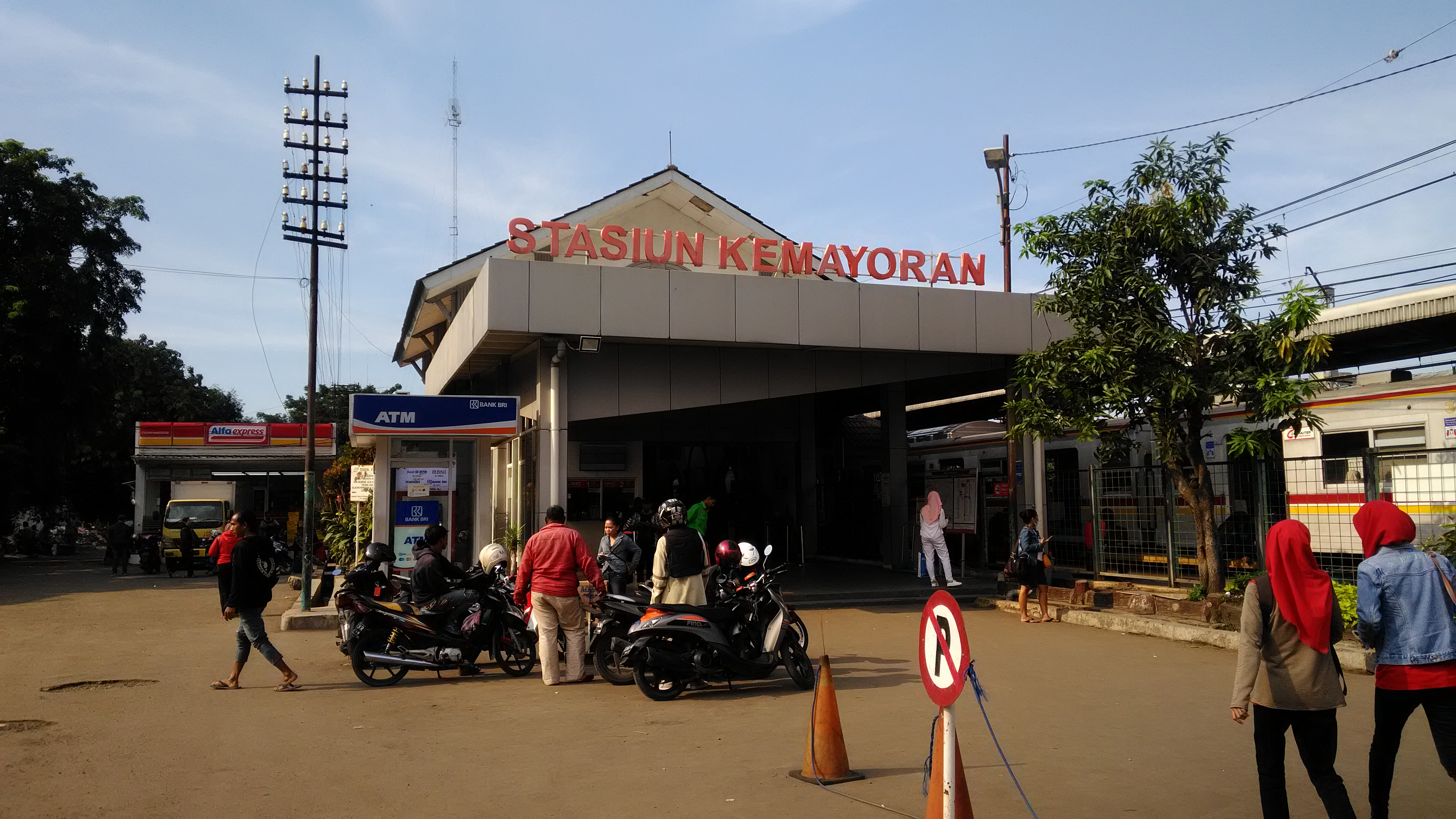
- Entrance of Kemayoran station

General information
- Location: Jalan Garuda, South Gunung Sahari, Kemayoran, Central Jakarta; Jakarta; Indonesia
- Coordinates: 6°09′42″S 106°50′29″E
- Elevation: +4 m (13 ft)
- Owner: Kereta Api Indonesia
- Operator: KAI Commuter
- Lines: Rajawali–Cikampek railway; Cikarang Loop Line
- Platforms: 1 side platform 3 island platforms
- Tracks: 4

Construction
- Structure type: Grade-separated rail-rail crossing
- Parking: Available
- Accessible: Available

Other information
- Station code: KMO

History
- Former names: Kemajoran Station

Services
Preceding station		Following station
Rajawali towards Kampung Bandan or Jakarta Kota	Commuter Line Cikarang	Pasar Senen One-way operation
Rajawali One-way operation	Commuter Line Cikarang	Gang Sentiong towards Bekasi or Cikarang via Pasar Senen
Location
- Location within Jakarta

Kemayoran Station (KMO) is a railway station located at South Gunung Sahari, Kemayoran, Central Jakarta, Indonesia. This station is located between Pasar Senen railway station in the south and Rajawali railway station in the north. The station is a stoppage for Jakarta metro commuter rail.

== History ==
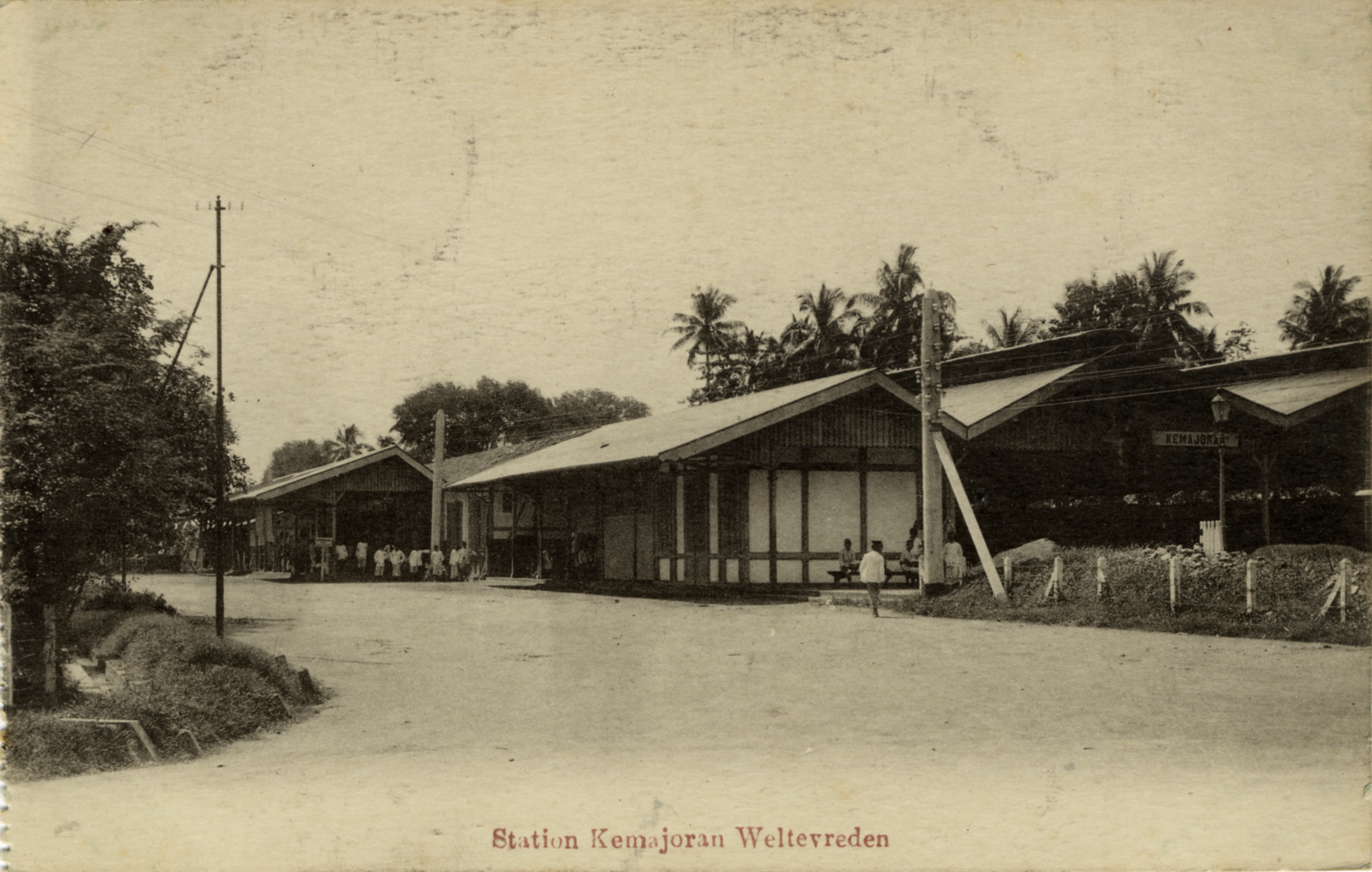
The first generation of Kemayoran station when it was still using wood structure

The station is located on the former BOSM line north of Pasar Senen station, at the eastern end of the Weltevreden region. This station is named after the name of the surrounding residential area, established in the early 20th century. The station and track were taken over by Maatschappij tot Exploitatie van Staatsspoorwegen in 1898.

Since being taken over by SS, Kemayoran station was later developed by SS. In 1902, a shortcut path from Kemayoran to Ancol was built, used to accelerate the flow of goods shipments to Tanjung Priuk. With the operation of the electric locomotive and electric train (KRL) on the Batavia-Buitenzorg line in 1925, SS then planned the construction of a double track in almost all Jakarta crossings since 1926. As a first step, the first double track on the Batavia line was between Kemayoran – Batavia and Sawah Besar – Weltevreden. In fact, the reshuffle was also carried out on the route to Tanjung Priok after the inauguration of the new station in 1925. According to Reitsma (1920), the road plot between Rajawali–Kemayoran is the quadruple-track railway in Indonesia.

== Building and layout ==
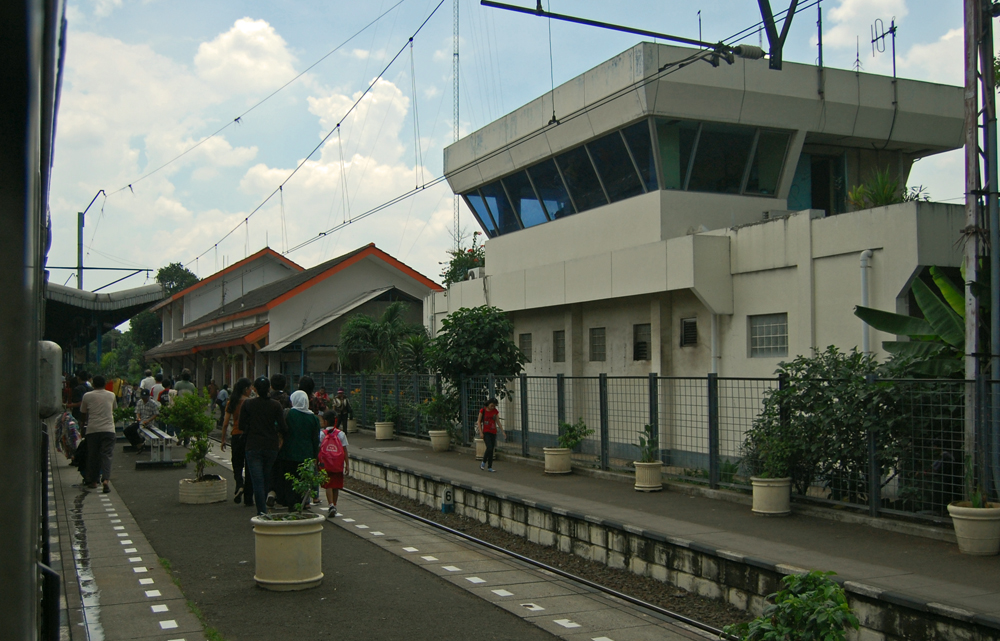
The emplacement of the station and the signal tower at the right

This station has four railway lines. The north emplacement is a quadruple-track, while the south emplacement is a double track. Line 1 is a straight track heading towards Pasar Senen–Jatinegara, line 2 is a straight track towards Rajawali–Kampung Bandan, line 3 is a straight track from Tanjung Priuk–Ancol, and line 4 is a straight track towards Ancol–Tanjung Priuk.

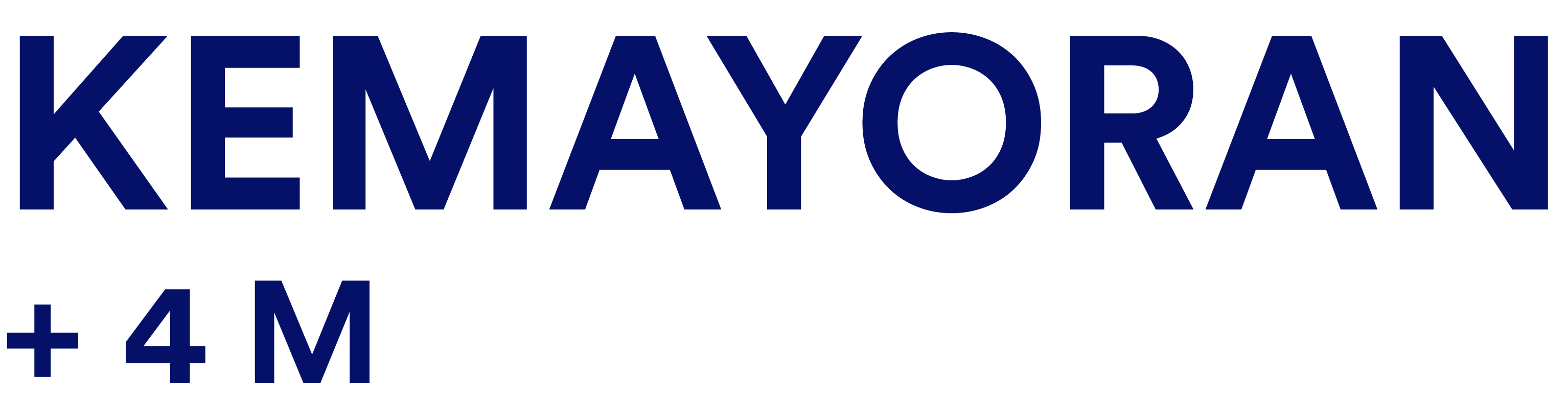
C05
P Platform floor	Line 4	Direct tracks to Jatinegara
P Platform floor	Island platform
P Platform floor	Line 3	Direct tracks to Kampung Bandan
P Platform floor	Island platform
P Platform floor	Line 2	← (Rajawali) Cikarang Loop Line (counterclockwise loop) towards Kampung Bandan
P Platform floor	Island platform
P Platform floor	Jalur 1	Cikarang Loop Line (clockwise loop) to Cikarang (Gang Sentiong) →
P Platform floor	Side platform, the doors are opened on the right side
G	Main building

== Services ==
Starting 8 June 2019, all local train trips serving the Jakarta-Cikampek-Purwakarta pp route (Cilamaya Ekspres, Walahar Ekspres, and Jatiluhur/Lokal CKP) no longer stop at this station. Automatically, since then this station has only served KRL Commuterline trips.

The following is a list of train services at the Kemayoran Station.

=== Passenger services ===
- KAI Commuter
  - Cikarang Loop Line (Full Racket)
    - to Cikarang (counter-clockwise via Tanah Abang and Manggarai)
    - to Cikarang (clockwise via Kramat)

== Supporting transportation ==
Type	Route	Destination
TransJakarta	12B (MetroTrans)	Senen–Pluit
TransJakarta	JAK-24 (MikroTrans Jak Lingko)	Senen–Pulo Gadung (via Bouevard Barat Kelapa Gading and Boulevard Raya Kelapa Gading)

Preceding station	Kereta Api Indonesia	Following station
Rajawali; Terminus	Rajawali–Cikampek	Pasar Senen towards Cikampek
