= Kenari, Senen =

Administrative village in Indonesia

Coordinates: 6°11′40″S 106°50′48″E

Kenari
- Administrative village
- Interactive map of Kenari
- Country: Indonesia
- Province: DKI Jakarta
- Administrative city: Central Jakarta
- District: Senen
- Postal code: 10430

Kenari is an administrative village in the Senen district of Indonesia. It has postal code of 10430.

The administrative village is also known as the southernmost area of Senen Subdistrict and the location of the University of Indonesia and Cipto Mangunkusumo Hospital.

== See also ==
- Senen
- List of administrative villages of Jakarta
