= Kramat, Senen =

Kramat
- Administrative village
- Interactive map of Kramat
- Country: Indonesia
- Province: DKI Jakarta
- Administrative city: Central Jakarta
- District: Senen
- Postal code: 10450

Kramat is an administrative village in the Senen district of Indonesia. It has postal code of 10450. The area had been the cemetery areas for Chinese Indonesians.

== See also ==
- Senen
- List of administrative villages of Jakarta
