= Saint Mary Juanda Museum =

Museum in Indonesia

- Museum Santa Maria Juanda
- Location: Jalan Ir. H. Juanda No.29, Kebon Kelapa, Gambir Kebon Kelapa, Gambir, Central Jakarta
- Owner: The Saint Mary Ursulin Community

Saint Mary Juanda Museum (in indonesian: Museum Santa Maria Juanda) is a museum that showcases items from the Saint Mary School Catholic Monastery. The museum is run and owned by The Saint Mary Ursulin Community.

== History ==
The Saint Mary Ursulin Community are catholic nuns that came for the first time to Batavia (modern day Jakarta) on 7 February 1856. The museums collection came from the school and dorm off the Ursulin students, which was established on 1 Agustus 1856 and is still used. At first the collection was only displayed for the students at Santa Mary School since 6 February 2011. On 2016 the museum was open to the public.

== Collection ==
In the museum there are abbot's bedrooms, dining room, chests, prayer texts, recreation rooms, relics and relics of saints who are considered valuable. In addition, there is an explanation of the missions carried out in Batavia, Papua, and Nanga Pinoh.

== Location ==
The Saint Mary Juanda Museum is located at Jalan Ir. H. Juanda No.29, Kebon Kelapa, Gambir, Central Jakarta. Its coordinates are 6°10'01.0" south latitude and 106°49'30.1" east longitude. The museum can be reached via Juanda Station as far as 850 meters, from Gambir Station as far as 3.2 km, or from Pasar Senen Terminal as far as 2.7
