= Bungur, Senen =

Bungur
- Administrative village
- Location within Jakarta Location within Jakarta Metropolitan Area Location within Indonesia
- Country: Indonesia
- Province: DKI Jakarta
- Administrative city: Central Jakarta
- District: Senen
- Postal code: 10460

Bungur is an administrative village in the Senen district of Indonesia. It has postal code of 10460.

== See also ==
- Senen
- List of administrative villages of Jakarta
