= Menteng, Menteng =

Menteng
- Administrative village
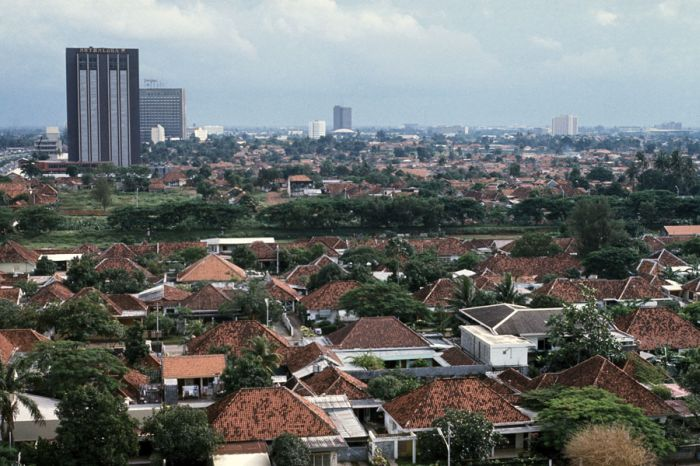
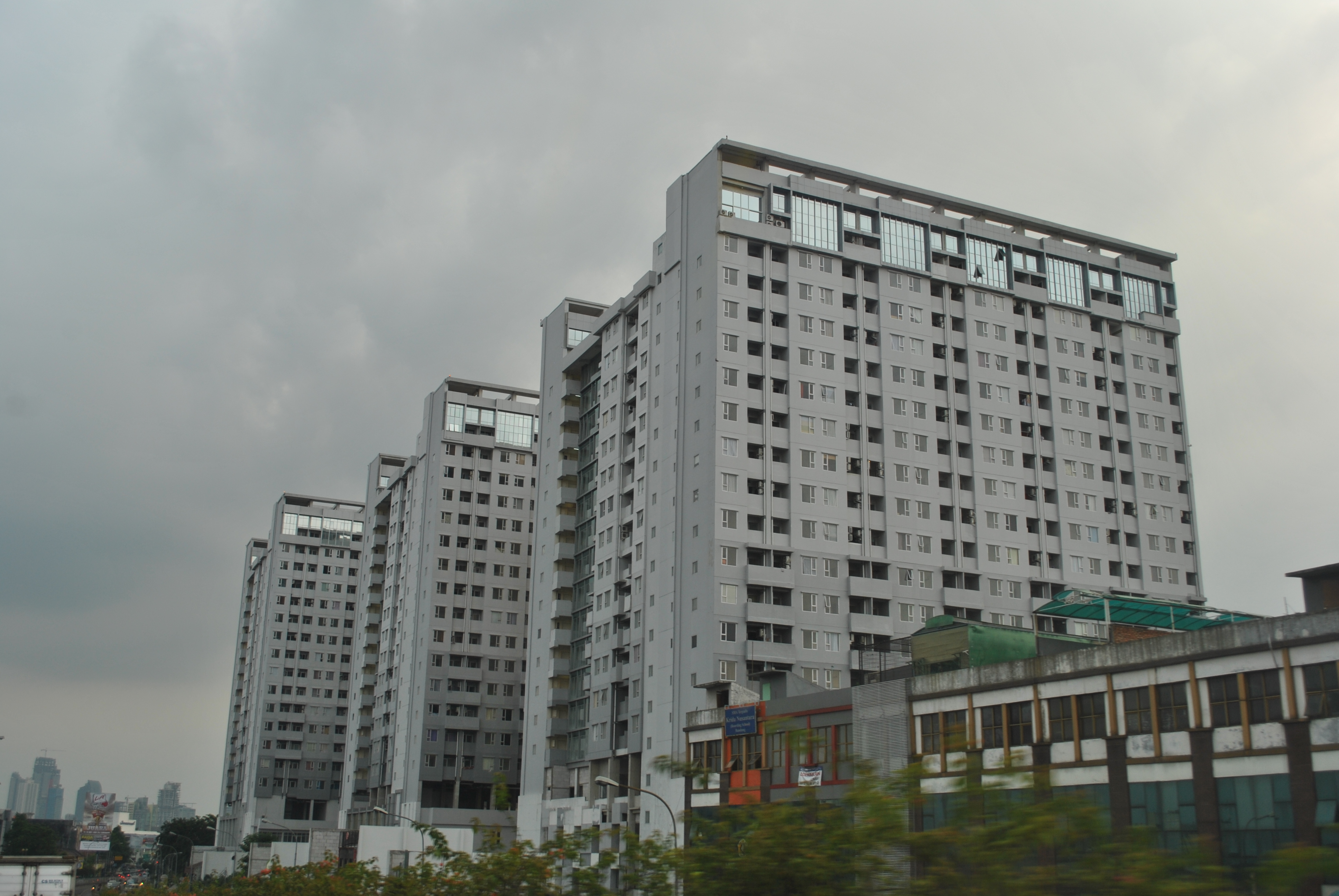
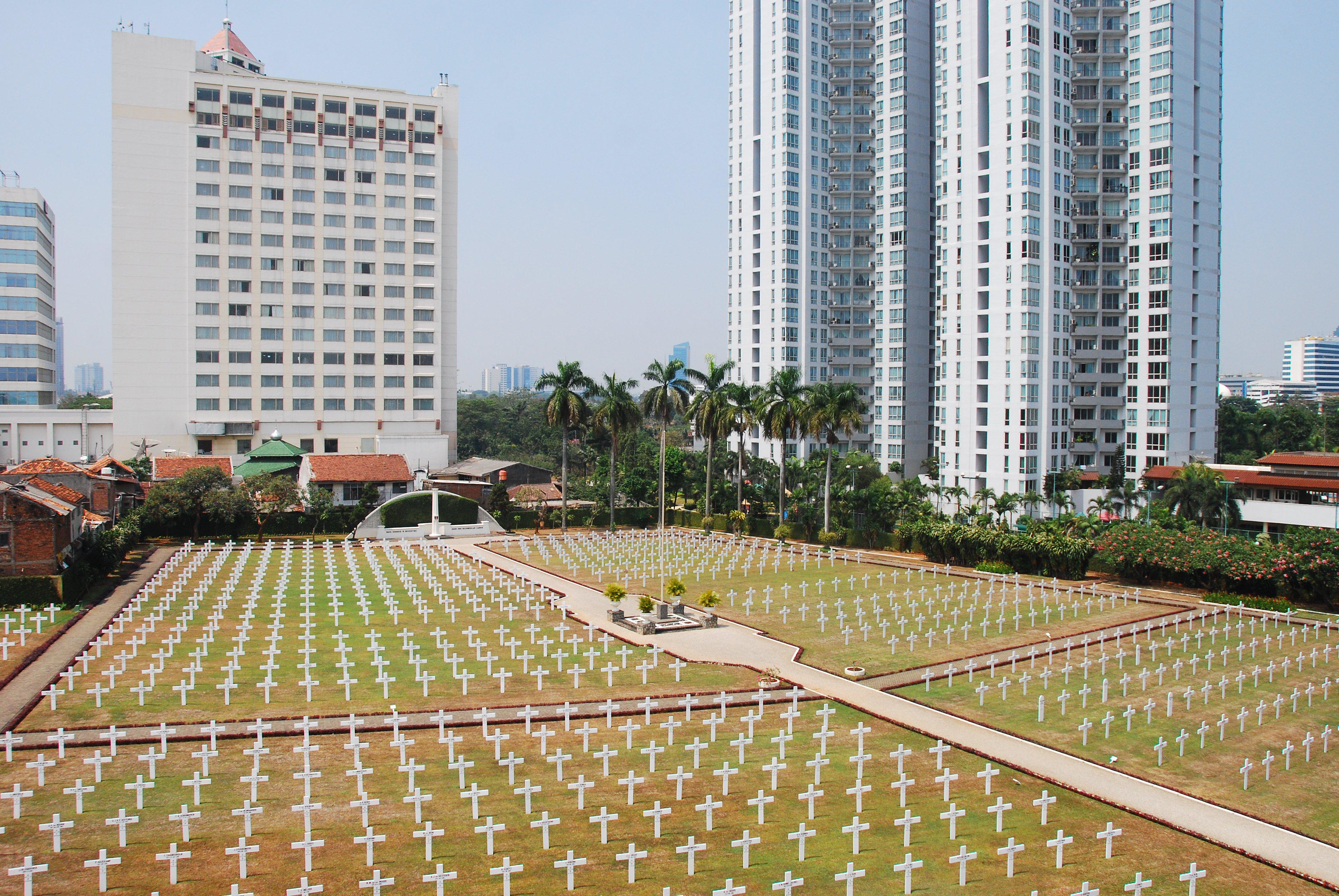
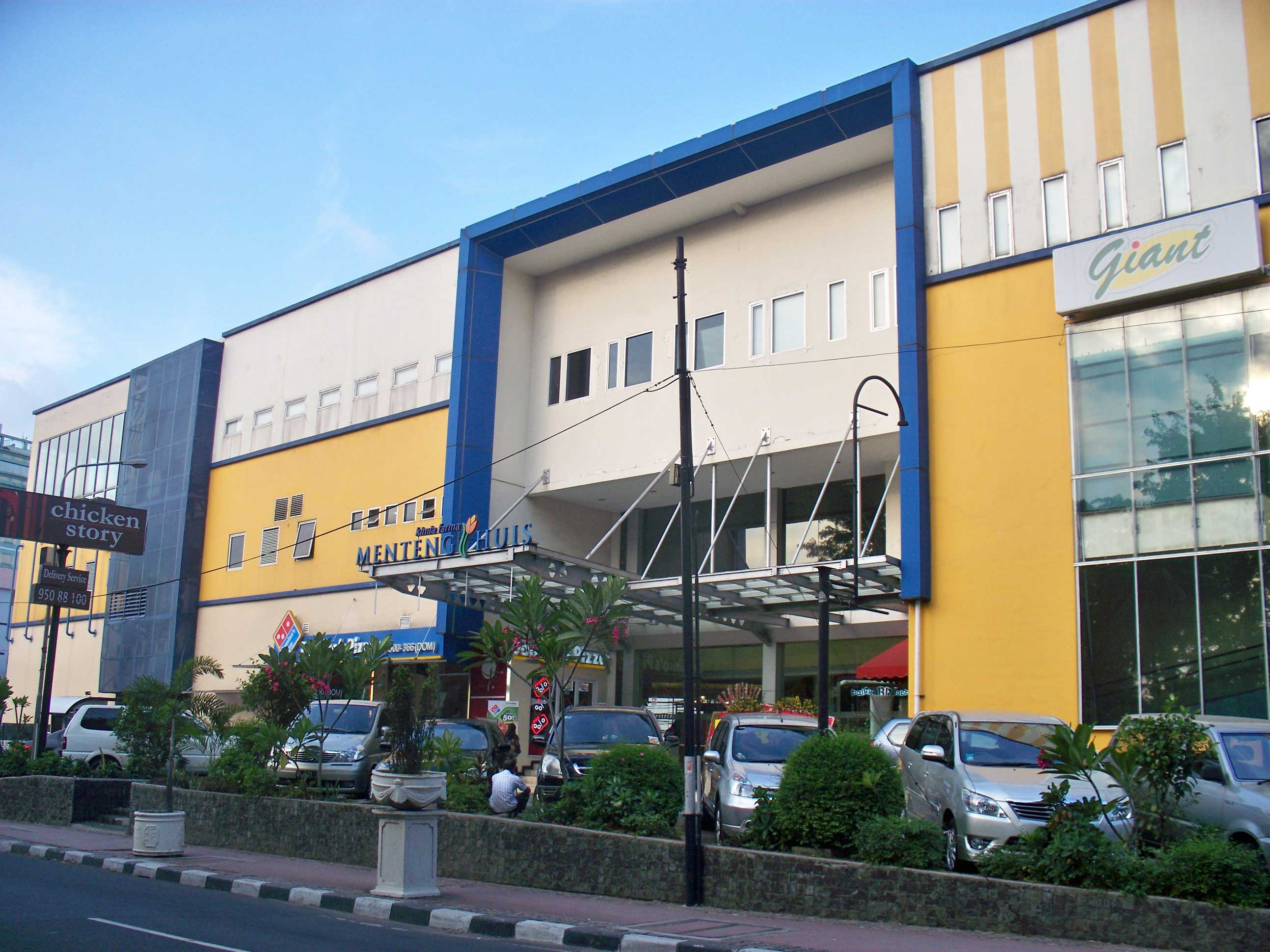
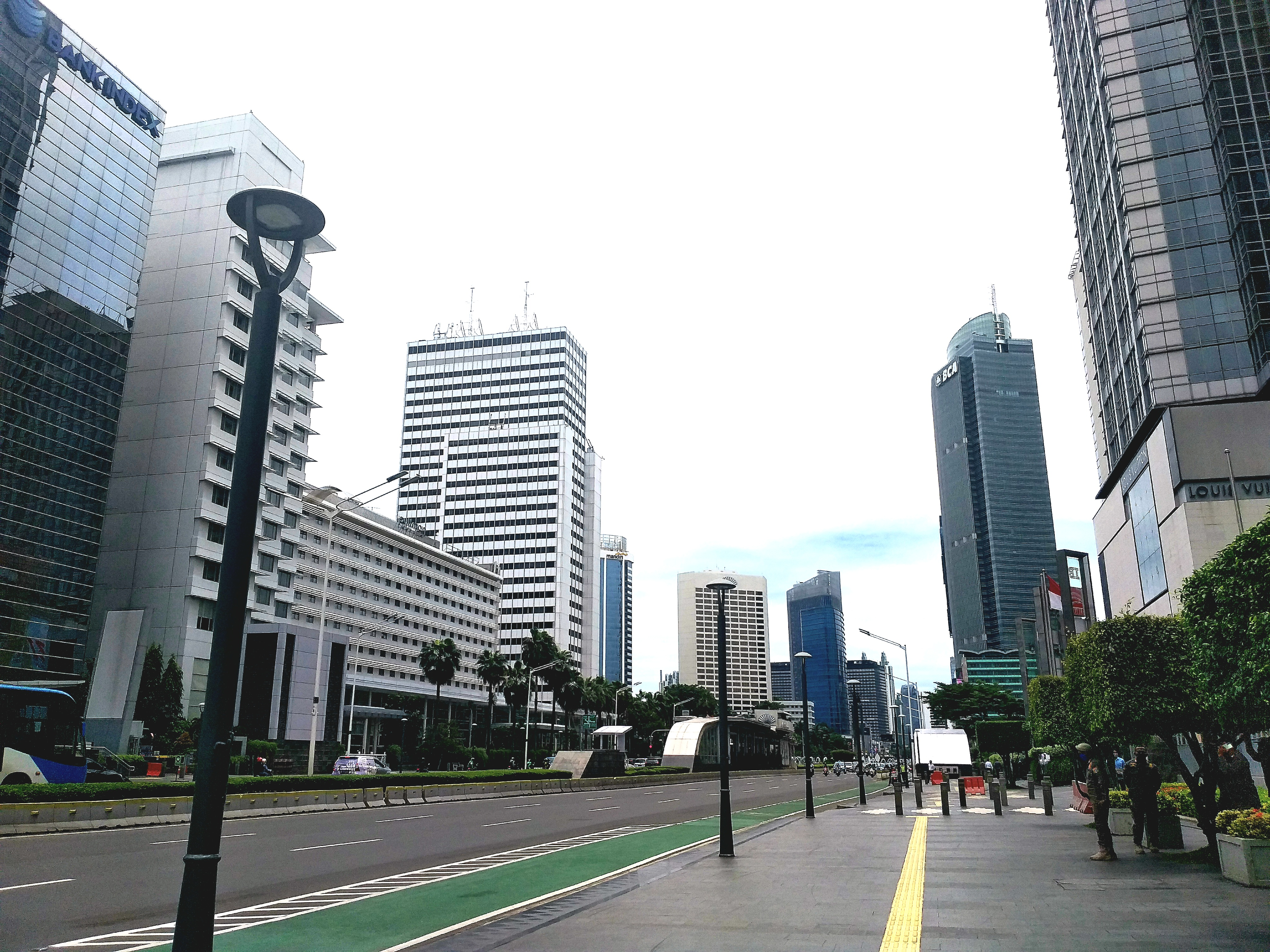
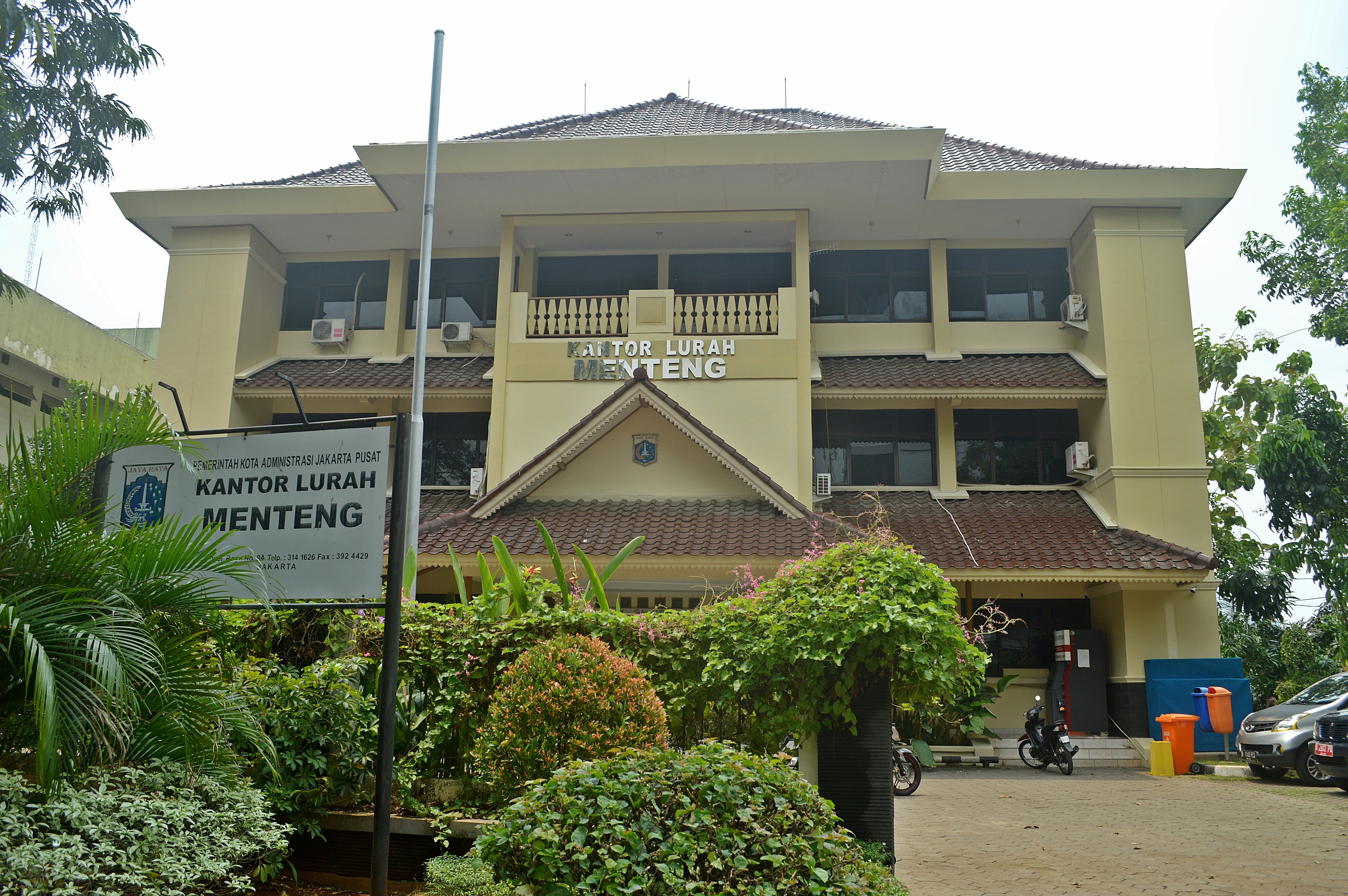
- Interactive map of Menteng
- Country: Indonesia
- Province: DKI Jakarta
- Administrative city: Central Jakarta
- District: Menteng
- Postal code: 10310

Menteng is an administrative village in the Menteng district of Indonesia. It has a postal code of 10310. It is located on the southern area of the Menteng Project.

== See also ==
- List of administrative villages of Jakarta
