= 2025 Terra Drone Building fire =

2025 fire in Jakarta, Indonesia

- Date: 9 December 2025
- Time: ~12:43 local time (WIB, UTC+07:00)
- Location: Jalan Letjen Suprapto, Cempaka Baru, Kemayoran, Jakarta, Indonesia
- Cause: Under investigation
- Deaths: 22
- Injuries: 19
- Arrests: 1

On 9 December 2025, a fire occurred at a seven-story shophouse, the Terra Drone Building, on Jalan Letjen Suprapto, Cempaka Baru, Kemayoran, Jakarta, Indonesia. The incident resulted in 22 fatalities and the massive deployment of firefighters.

== Fire ==
The fire was suspected to have started in a warehouse on the first floor of the building, with strong suspicions that it originated from a burning lithium battery. A statement from the Central Jakarta Metro Police Chief, Senior Commissioner Susatyo Purnomo Condro, confirmed this suspicion, although there are other suspicions regarding an electrical short circuit as the initial trigger. An employee also reported that a loud explosion was heard before the fire grew. Although employees attempted to extinguish the fire on the first floor, the fire spread rapidly because the floor functioned as a storage warehouse.

The growing fire then produced thick, dense smoke that quickly filled the second and third floors and spread up to the sixth floor. At the time of the incident, employees were scattered; most were outside the building for lunch, while the rest were resting on floors 2 to 6. Employees trapped on the upper floors immediately panicked and many tried to save themselves by running to the roof of the building.

Firefighters (Damkar) arrived at the location at around 12.50 WIB and deployed a total of 28 fire trucks and more than 100 personnel to handle the situation. The evacuation process was dramatic; trapped employees shouted for help from the highest point of the building. Officers evacuated victims who were on the rooftop using emergency stairs from the fire trucks installed on the side of the building. A total of 19 people were successfully rescued, including those who jumped to the next building, although some experienced shortness of breath.

The extinguishing process faced serious obstacles due to the very thick smoke, making it difficult for officers to penetrate and comb through each floor, especially the sixth floor. This condition forced officers to break through the building's windows, which resulted in several police officers being injured. The fire was successfully tamed in the afternoon, and continued with the cooling process and final combing.

== Victims ==
This incident claimed a total of 22 lives, as confirmed by the police. The victims consisted of 7 men and 15 women, one of them being a pregnant woman. The majority of the victims who died were found not with burns, but were suspected to have died from suffocation due to inhaling thick smoke and lack of oxygen. All the bodies of the victims were evacuated to the Kramat Jati Police Hospital, East Jakarta, for further identification.

== Investigation and impact ==
The Terra Drone Building fire caused severe traffic jams on Jalan Letjen Suprapto due to the deployment of emergency units. Until now, the exact cause of the fire is still under investigation by the Indonesian National Police Forensic Laboratory (Labfor) team, while material losses due to this incident are also still being recorded. The Greater Jakarta Metropolitan Regional Police has stated the main director of Terra Drone with the initial MW as a suspect.
