= Kebon Kacang, Tanah Abang =

Kebon Kacang
- Administrative village
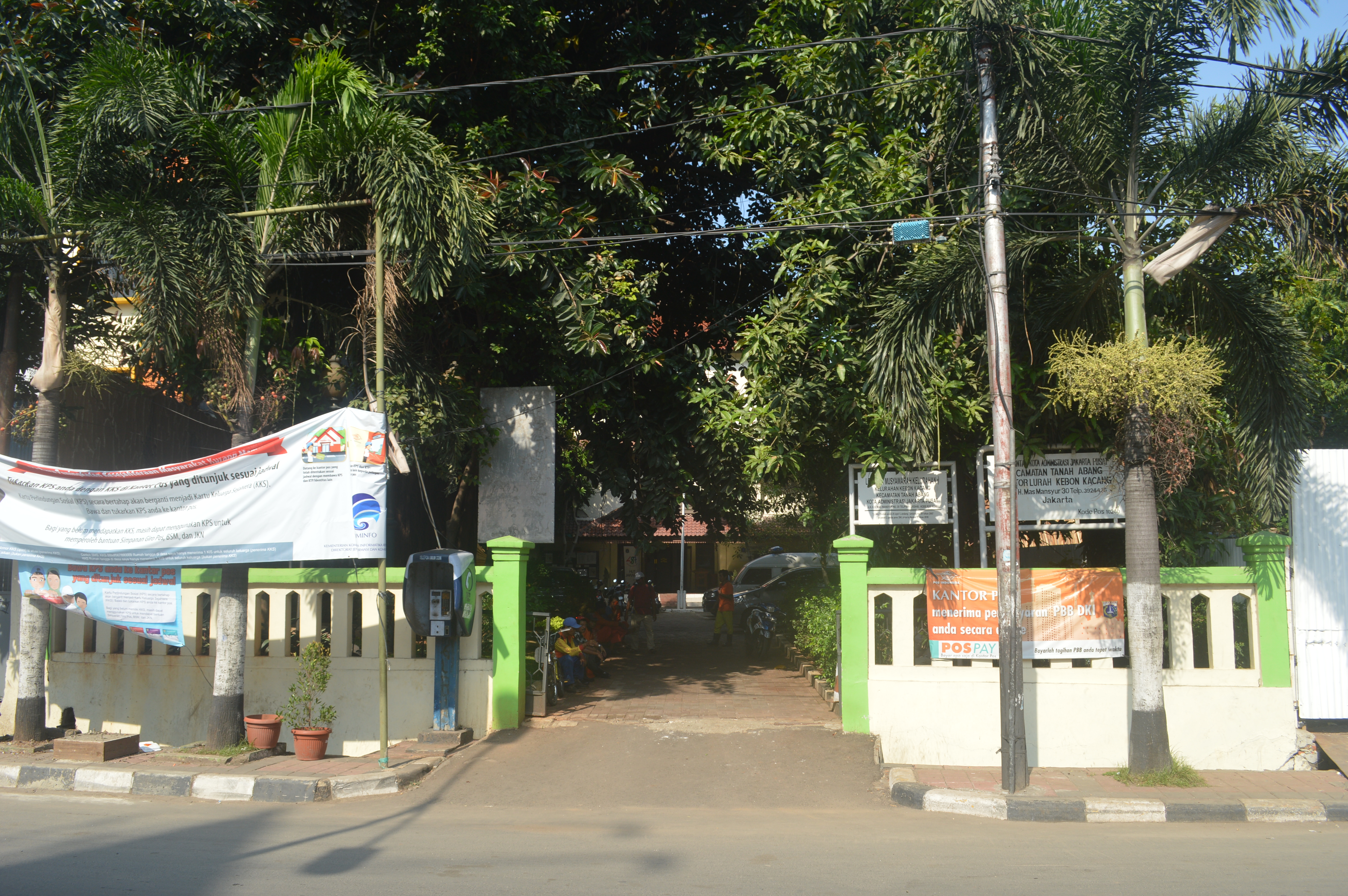
- Kebon Kacang administrative village government office
- Interactive map of Kebon Kacang
- Country: Indonesia
- Province: DKI Jakarta
- Administrative city: Central Jakarta
- District: Tanah Abang
- Postal code: 10240

Kebon Kacang is an administrative village in Tanah Abang, Central Jakarta, Indonesia. It has a postal code of 10240.

== See also ==
- Tanah Abang
- List of administrative villages of Jakarta
