= Utan Panjang, Kemayoran =

Coordinates: 6.1651°S 106.8539°E

Utan Panjang
- Administrative village
- Interactive map of Utan Panjang
- Country: Indonesia
- Province: DKI Jakarta
- Administrative city: Central Jakarta
- District: Kemayoran
- Postal code: 10650

Utan Panjang is an administrative village in the Kemayoran district of Indonesia. It has a postal code of 10650.

== See also ==
- List of administrative villages of Jakarta
