= Petojo Utara, Gambir =

Petojo Utara
- Administrative village
- Location within Indonesia
- Coordinates: 6°10′S 106°49′E
- Country: Indonesia
- Province: DKI Jakarta
- Administrative city: Central Jakarta
- District: Gambir
- Postal code: 10130

Petojo Utara is an administrative village in the Gambir district of Indonesia. It has a postal code of 10130.

== See also ==
- List of administrative villages of Jakarta
