= Kartini, Sawah Besar =

Kartini
- Administrative village
- Interactive map of Kartini
- Country: Indonesia
- Province: DKI Jakarta
- Administrative city: Central Jakarta
- District: Sawah Besar
- Postal code: 10750

Kartini is an administrative village in the Sawah Besar district of Jakarta, Indonesia, bearing the postal code of 10750.

== See also ==
- List of administrative villages of Jakarta
