= Petojo Selatan, Gambir =

Petojo Selatan
- Administrative village
- Interactive map of Petojo Selatan
- Coordinates: 6°10′S 106°49′E
- Country: Indonesia
- Province: DKI Jakarta
- Administrative city: Central Jakarta
- District: Gambir
- Postal code: 10160

Petojo Selatan is an administrative village in the Gambir district of Indonesia. It has a postal code of 10160.

== See also ==
- List of administrative villages of Jakarta
