= Mangga Dua Selatan =

- Administrative village
- Interactive map of Mangga Dua Selatan
- Country: Indonesia
- Province: DKI Jakarta
- Administrative city: Central Jakarta
- District: Sawah Besar
- Postal code: 10730

Mangga Dua Selatan is an administrative village in the Sawah Besar district of Indonesia. It has postal code of 10730.

== See also ==
- List of administrative villages of Jakarta
