= Kemayoran, Kemayoran =

Kemayoran
- Administrative village
- Interactive map of Kemayoran
- Coordinates: 6°09′53″S 106°50′44″E
- Country: Indonesia
- Province: DKI Jakarta
- Administrative city: Central Jakarta
- District: Kemayoran
- Postal code: 10620

Kemayoran is an administrative village in the Kemayoran district of Indonesia. It has a postal code of 10620.

== See also ==
- List of administrative villages of Jakarta
