= Serdang =

Serdang may refer to:

- Kampong Serdang, a village in Brunei
- Sultanate of Serdang, an ancient Indonesian monarchy
- Seri Kembangan, a town in Selangor, Malaysia
- Serdang, a town in Kedah, Malaysia
- MV Serdang, a Singaporean coaster
- Serdang, Kemayoran, a kelurahan in Kemayoran, Central Jakarta
- Serdang (federal constituency), represented in the Dewan Rakyat
- Seri Serdang (state constituency), represented in the Selangor State Legislative Assembly
- Serdang (Selangor state constituency), formerly represented in the Selangor State Legislative Assembly (1959–95)
- Serdang (Kedah state constituency), formerly represented in the Kedah State Legislative Assembly (1974–86)

== See also ==
- Deli Serdang, a regency in North Sumatra, Indonesia
- PSDS Deli Serdang, an Indonesian soccer team in North Sumatra
