= Duri Pulo, Gambir =

Duri Pulo
- Administrative village
- Interactive map of Duri Pulo
- Coordinates: 6°09′49″S 106°48′17″E
- Country: Indonesia
- Province: DKI Jakarta
- Administrative city: Central Jakarta
- District: Gambir
- Postal code: 10140

Duri Pulo is an administrative village in the Gambir district of Indonesia. It has a postal code of 10140.

== See also ==
- List of administrative villages of Jakarta
