= Tanah Tinggi, Johar Baru =

Galur
- Administrative village
- Interactive map of Galur
- Country: Indonesia
- Province: DKI Jakarta
- Administrative city: Central Jakarta
- District: Johar Baru
- Postal code: 10540

Tanah Tinggi is an administrative village in the Johar Baru district of Indonesia. It has a postal code of 10540.

== Tanah Tinggi residential area ==
Tanah Tinggi residential neighborhood, just to the east of Pasar Senen, was one of the major housing initiatives planned by the Jakarta city government in the 1950s. In 1951, 25 hectares of land were designated for housing in Tanah Tinggi. In the 1960s, the residential area had been established.

== See also ==
- List of administrative villages of Jakarta

== Cited works ==
- Merrillees, Scott (2015). Jakarta: Portraits of a Capital 1950-1980. Jakarta: Equinox Publishing. ISBN 9786028397308.
