= Kampung Bali, Tanah Abang =

Kampung Bali
- Administrative village
- Interactive map of Kampung Bali
- Coordinates: 6.2000°S 106.8000°E
- Country: Indonesia
- Province: DKI Jakarta
- Administrative city: Central Jakarta
- District: Tanah Abang
- Postal code: 10250

Kampung Bali is an administrative village in the Tanah Abang district of Indonesia. It has postal code of 10250.

== See also ==
- Tanah Abang
- List of administrative villages of Jakarta
