= Johar Baru, Johar Baru =

Johar Baru
- Administrative village
- Interactive map of Johar Baru
- Coordinates: 6°11′S 106°52′E
- Country: Indonesia
- Province: DKI Jakarta
- Administrative city: Central Jakarta
- District: Johar Baru
- Postal code: 10560

Johar Baru is an administrative village in the Johar Baru district of Indonesia. Its postal code is 10560.

== See also ==
- List of administrative villages of Jakarta
