= List of administrative villages of Jakarta =

This is a list of administrative villages of Jakarta.

== Central Jakarta ==
=== Gambir ===
- Gambir
- Kebon Kelapa
- Petojo Selatan
- Duri Pulo
- Cideng
- Petojo Utara

=== Cempaka Putih ===
- Cempaka Putih Timur
- Cempaka Putih Barat
- Rawasari

=== Johar Baru ===
- Galur
- Tanah Tinggi
- Kampung Rawa
- Johar Baru

=== Kemayoran ===
- Gunung Sahari Selatan
- Kemayoran
- Kebon Kosong
- Cempaka Baru
- Harapan Mulya
- Sumur Batu
- Serdang
- Utan Panjang

=== Menteng ===
- Menteng
- Pegangsaan
- Cikini
- Kebon Sirih
- Gondangdia

=== Sawah Besar ===
- Pasar Baru
- Gunung Sahari Utara
- Mangga Dua Selatan
- Karang Anyar
- Kartini

=== Tanah Abang ===
- Bendungan Hilir
- Karet Tengsin
- Kebon Melati
- Kebon Kacang
- Kampung Bali
- Petamburan
- Gelora

== West Jakarta ==
=== Cengkareng ===
- Kedaung Kali Angke
- Kapuk
- Cengkareng Barat
- Cengkareng Timur
- Rawa Buaya
- Duri Kosambi

=== Grogol Petamburan ===
- Tomang
- Grogol
- Jelambar
- Jelambar Baru
- Wijaya Kusuma
- Tanjung Duren Utara
- Tanjung Duren Selatan

=== Kalideres ===
- Kamal - area code 11810
- Tegal Alur - area code 11820
- Pegadungan - area code 11830
- Kalideres - area code 11840
- Semanan - area code 11850

=== Kebon Jeruk ===
- Duri Kepa - area code 11510
- Kedoya Selatan - area code 11520
- Kedoya Utara - area code 11520
- Kebon Jeruk - area code 11530
- Sukabumi Utara - area code 11540
- Kelapa Dua - area code 11550
- Sukabumi Selatan - area code 11560

=== Kembangan ===
- Kembangan Utara - area code 11610
- Kembangan Selatan - area code 11610
- Meruya Utara - area code 11620
- Srengseng - area code 11630
- Joglo - area code 11640
- Meruya Selatan - area code 11650

=== Palmerah ===
- Slipi - area code 11410
- Kota Bambu Utara - area code 11420
- Kota Bambu Selatan - area code 11420
- Jatipulo - area code 11430
- Palmerah - area code 11480
- Kemanggisan - area code 11480

=== Taman Sari ===
- Pinangsia - area code 11110
- Glodok - area code 11120. The area is Jakarta's oldest and largest China town.
- Keagungan - area code 11130
- Krukut - area code 11140
- Taman Sari - area code 11150
- Maphar - area code 11160
- Tangki - area code 11170
- Mangga Besar - area code 11180

=== Tambora ===
- Tanah Sareal - area code 11210
- Tambora - area code 11220
- Roa Malaka - area code 11230
- Pekojan - area code 11240
- Jembatan Lima - area code 11250
- Krendang - area code 11260
- Duri Utara - area code 11270
- Duri Selatan - area code 11270
- Kali Anyar - area code 11310
- Jembatan Besi - area code 11320
- Angke - area code 11330

== North Jakarta ==
=== Cilincing ===
- Kali Baru – area code 14110
- Cilincing – area code 14120
- Semper Barat – area code 14130
- Semper Timur – area code 14130
- Sukapura – area code 14140
- Rorotan – area code 14140
- Marunda – area code 14150

=== Koja ===
- Koja Utara - area code 14210
- Koja Selatan - area code 14220
- Rawa Badak Utara - area code 14230
- Rawa Badak Selatan - area code 14230
- Tugu Utara - area code 14260
- Tugu Selatan - area code 14260
- Lagoa - area code 14270

=== Kelapa Gading ===
- Kelapa Gading Barat - area code 14240
- Kelapa Gading Timur - area code 14240
- Pegangsaan Dua - area code 14250

=== Tanjung Priok ===
- Tanjung Priok - area code 14310
- Kebon Bawang - area code 14320
- Sungai Bambu - area code 14330
- Papanggo - area code 14340
- Warakas - area code 14340
- Sunter Agung - area code 14350
- Sunter Jaya - area code 14350

=== Pademangan ===
- Pademangan Timur - area code 14410
- Pademangan Barat - area code 14420
- Ancol - area code 14430

=== Penjaringan ===
- Penjaringan - area code 14440
- Pluit - area code 14450
- Pejagalan - area code 14450
- Kapuk Muara - area code 14460
- Kamal Muara - area code 14470

== East Jakarta ==
=== Cakung ===
- Cakung Timur - area code 13910
- Cakung Barat - area code 13910
- Rawa Terate - area code 13920
- Jatinegara - area code 13930
- Penggilingan - area code 13940
- Pulogebang - area code 13950
- Ujung Menteng - area code 13960

=== Cipayung ===
- Lubang Buaya - area code 13810
- Ceger - area code 13820
- Cipayung - area code 13840
- Munjul - area code 13850
- Pondok Ranggon - area code 13860
- Cilangkap - area code 13870
- Setu - area code 13880
- Bambu Apus - area code 13890

=== Ciracas ===
- Cibubur - area code 13720
- Kelapa Dua Wetan - area code 13730
- Ciracas - area code 13740
- Susukan - area code 13750
- Rambutan - area code 13830

=== Duren Sawit ===
- Pondok Bambu - area code 13430
- Duren Sawit - area code 13440
- Pondok Kelapa - area code 13450
- Pondok Kopi - area code 13460
- Malaka Jaya - area code 13460
- Malaka Sari - area code 13460
- Klender - area code 13470

=== Jatinegara ===
- Bali Mester - area code 13310
- Kampung Melayu - area code 13320
- Bidaracina - area code 13330
- Cipinang Cempedak - area code 13340
- Rawa Bunga - area code 13350
- Cipinang Besar Utara - area code 13410
- Cipinang Besar Selatan - area code 13410
- Cipinang Muara - area code 13420

=== Kramat Jati ===
- Kramat Jati - area code 13510
- Batuampar - area code 13520
- Balekambang - area code 13530
- Kampung Tengah - area code 13540
- Dukuh - area code 13550
- Cawang - area code 13630
- Cililitan - area code 13640

=== Makasar ===
- Pinang Ranti - area code 13560
- Makasar - area code 13570
- Halim Perdanakusuma - area code 13610
- Cipinang Melayu - area code 13620
- Kebon Pala - area code 13650

=== Matraman ===
- Pisangan Baru - area code 13110
- Utan Kayu Selatan - area code 13120
- Utan Kayu Utara - area code 13120
- Kayu Manis - area code 13130
- Pal Meriam - area code 13140
- Kebon Manggis - area code 13150

=== Pasar Rebo ===
- Pekayon - area code 13710
- Kampung Gedong - area code 13760
- Cijantung - area code 13770
- Kampung Baru - area code 13780
- Kalisari - area code 13790

=== Pulo Gadung ===
- Jatinegara Kaum - area code 13240
- Pisangan Timur - area code 13230
- Cipinang - area code 13250
- Pulo Gadung - area code 13260
- Kayu Putih - area code 13210
- Jati - area code 13220
- Rawamangun - area code 13220

== South Jakarta ==
=== Cilandak ===
- Cipete Selatan - area code 12410
- Gandaria Selatan - area code 12420
- Cilandak Barat - area code 12430
- Lebak Bulus - area code 12440
- Pondok Labu - area code 12450

=== Jagakarsa ===
- Tanjung Barat – area code 12530
- Lenteng Agung – area code 12610
- Jagakarsa – area code 12620
- Ciganjur – area code 12630
- Srengseng Sawah – area code 12640
- Cipedak – area code 12630

=== Kebayoran Baru ===
- Selong - area code 12110
- Gunung - area code 12120
- Kramat Pela - area code 12130
- Gandaria Utara - area code 12140
- Cipete Utara - area code 12150
- Pulo - area code 12160
- Melawai - area code 12160
- Petogogan - area code 12170
- Rawa Barat - area code 12180
- Senayan - area code 12190

=== Kebayoran Lama ===
- Grogol Utara - area code 12210
- Grogol Selatan - area code 12220
- Cipulir - area code 12230
- Kebayoran Lama Utara - area code 12240
- Kebayoran Lama Selatan - area code 12240
- Pondok Pinang - area code 12310

=== Mampang Prapatan ===
- Kuningan Barat - area code 12710
- Pela Mampang - area code 12720
- Bangka - area code 12730
- Tegal Parang - area code 12790
- Mampang Prapatan - area code 12790

=== Pancoran ===
- Kalibata - area code 12740
- Rawa Jati - area code 12750
- Duren Tiga - area code 12760
- Cikoko - area code 12770
- Pengadegan - area code 12770
- Pancoran - area code 12780

=== Pasar Minggu ===
- Pejaten Barat - area code 12510
- Pejaten Timur - area code 12510
- Pasar Minggu - area code 12520
- Kebagusan - area code 12520
- Jati Padang - area code 12540
- Ragunan - area code 12550
- Cilandak Timur - area code 12560

=== Pesanggrahan ===
- Ulujami - area code 12250
- Petukangan Utara - area code 12260
- Petukangan Selatan - area code 12270
- Pesanggrahan - area code 12320
- Bintaro - area code 12330

=== Setiabudi ===
- Setiabudi - area code 12910
- Karet - area code 12920
- Karet Semanggi - area code 12930
- Karet Kuningan - area code 12940
- Kuningan Timur - area code 12950
- Menteng Atas - area code 12960
- Pasar Manggis - area code 12970
- Guntur - area code 12980

=== Tebet ===
- Tebet Barat - area code 12810
- Tebet Timur - area code 12820
- Kebon Baru - area code 12830
- Bukit Duri - area code 12840
- Manggarai - area code 12850
- Manggarai Selatan - area code 12860
- Menteng Dalam - area code 12870
