= Kebon Melati, Tanah Abang =

Kebon Melati
- Administrative village
- Interactive map of Kebon Melati
- Country: Indonesia
- Province: DKI Jakarta
- Administrative city: Central Jakarta
- District: Tanah Abang
- Postal code: 10230

Kebon Melati is an administrative village in the Tanah Abang district of Indonesia. It has postal code of 10230.

== See also ==
- Tanah Abang
- List of administrative villages of Jakarta
