= Karet Tengsin, Tanah Abang =

Karet Tengsin
- Administrative village
- Interactive map of Karet Tengsin
- Country: Indonesia
- Province: DKI Jakarta
- Administrative city: Central Jakarta
- District: Tanah Abang
- Postal code: 10220

Karet Tengsin is an administrative village in the Tanah Abang district of Indonesia. Its postal code is 10220.

== See also ==
- Tanah Abang
- List of administrative villages of Jakarta
