= Galur, Johar Baru =

Galur
- Administrative village
- Location within Jakarta
- Country: Indonesia
- Province: DKI Jakarta
- Administrative city: Central Jakarta
- District: Johar Baru
- Postal code: 10530

Galur is an administrative village in the Johar Baru district of Indonesia. It has a postal code of 10530.

== See also ==
- List of administrative villages of Jakarta
