= Kebon Kosong, Kemayoran =

Kebon Kosong
- Administrative village
- Interactive map of Kebon Kosong
- Country: Indonesia
- Province: DKI Jakarta
- Administrative city: Central Jakarta
- District: Kemayoran
- Postal code: 10630

Kebon Kosong is an administrative village in the Kemayoran district of Indonesia. It has a postal code of 10630.

== See also ==
- List of administrative villages of Jakarta
