= Pegangsaan, Menteng =

Pegangsaan
- Administrative village
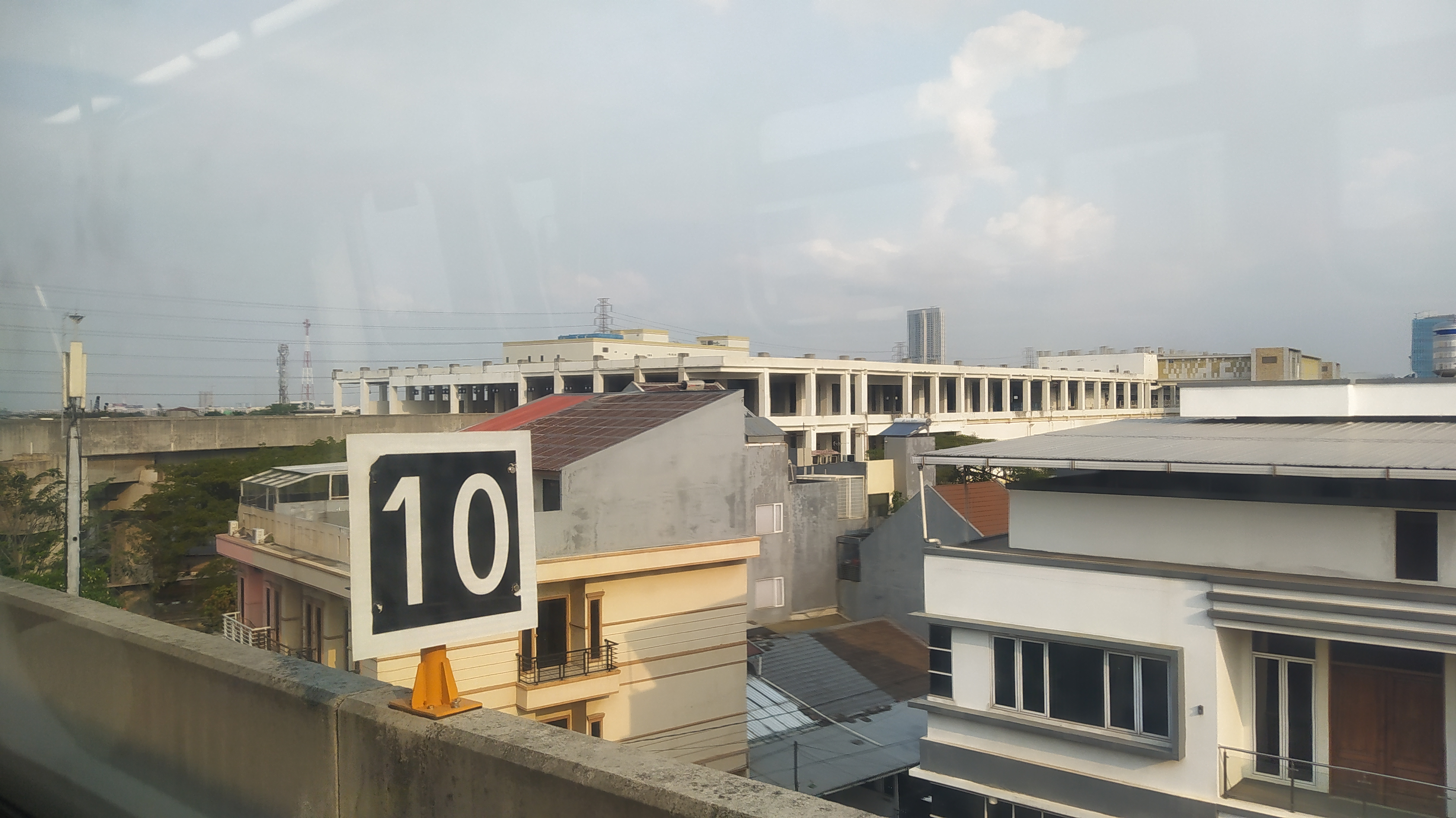
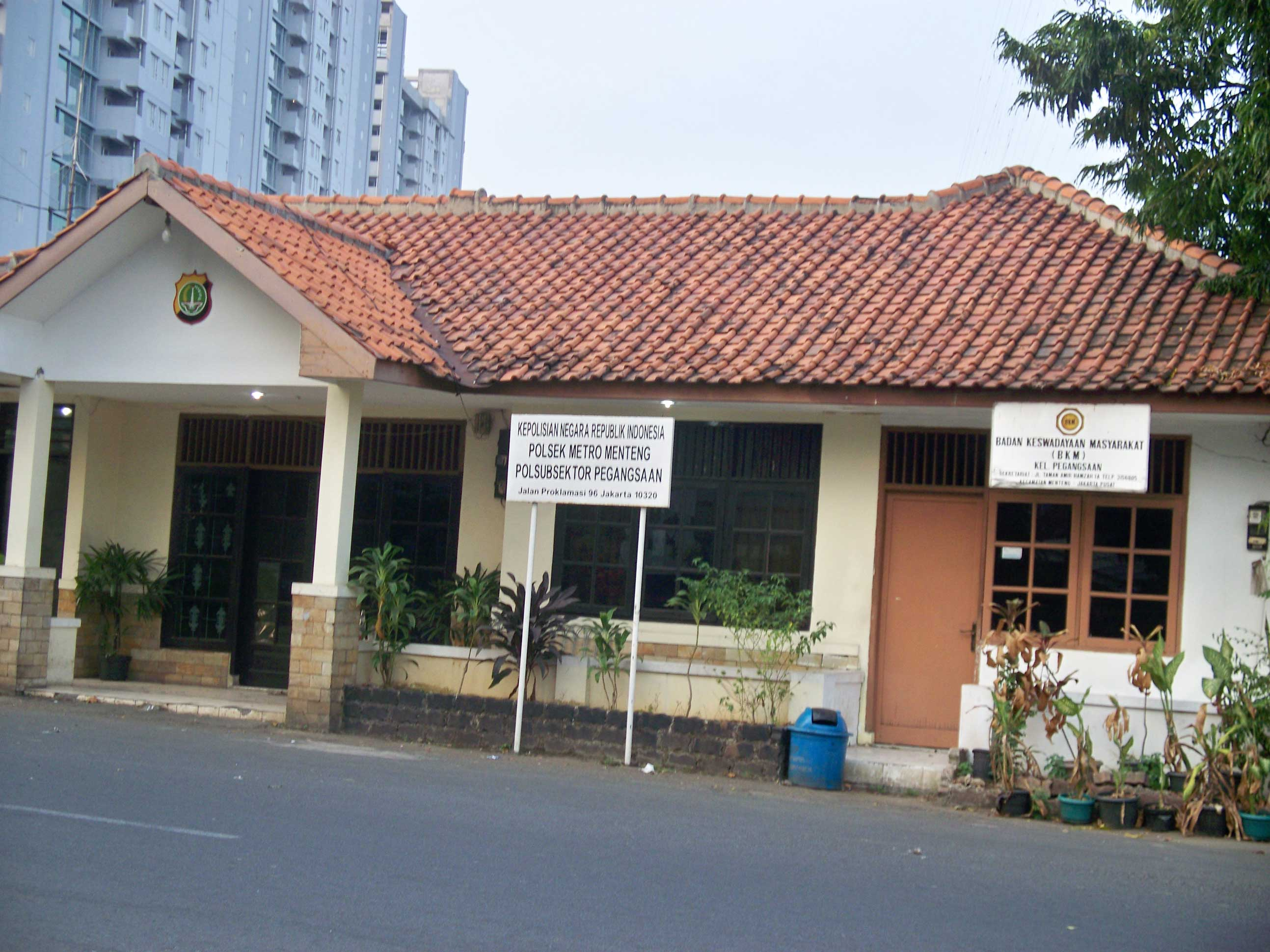
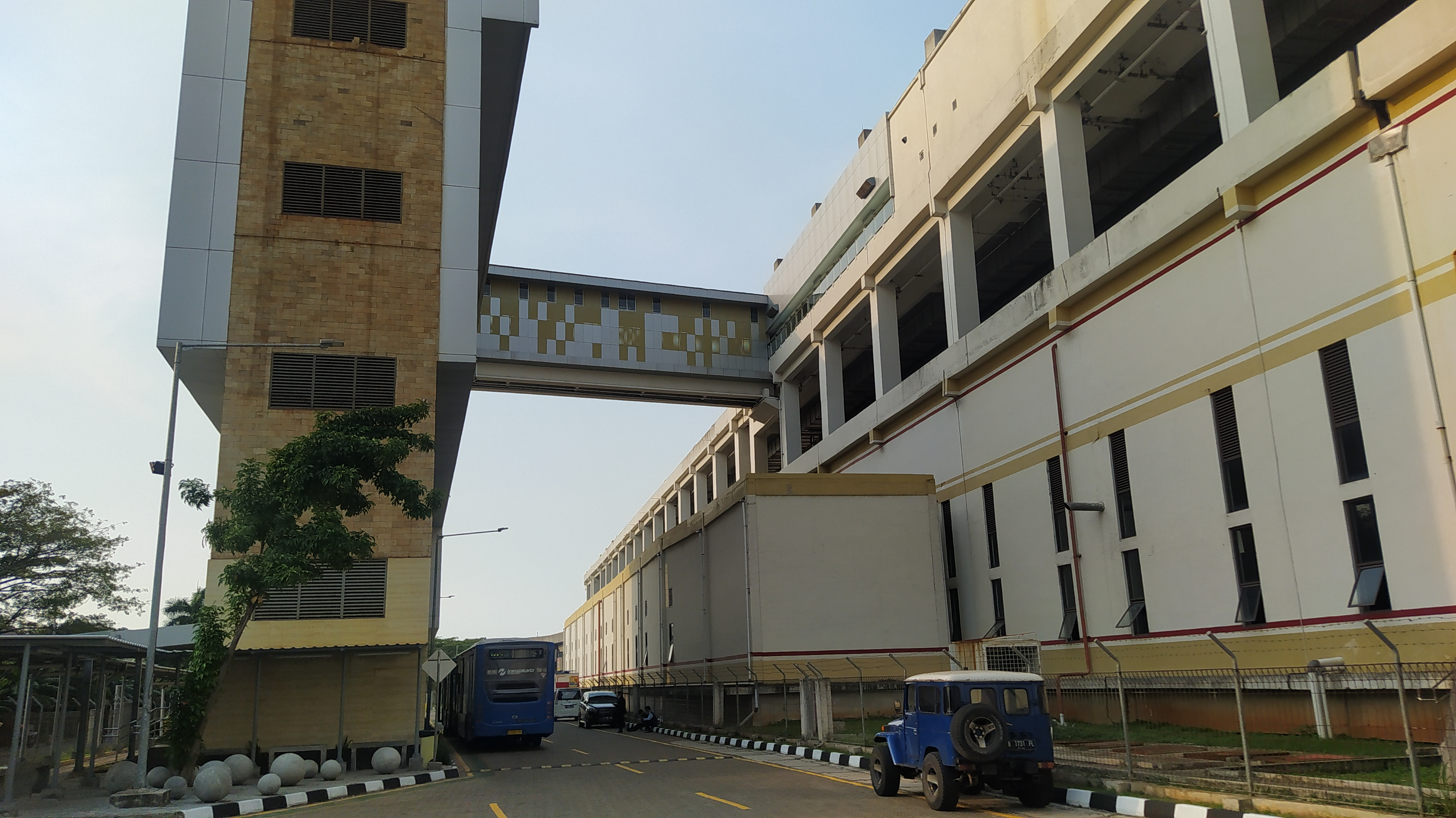
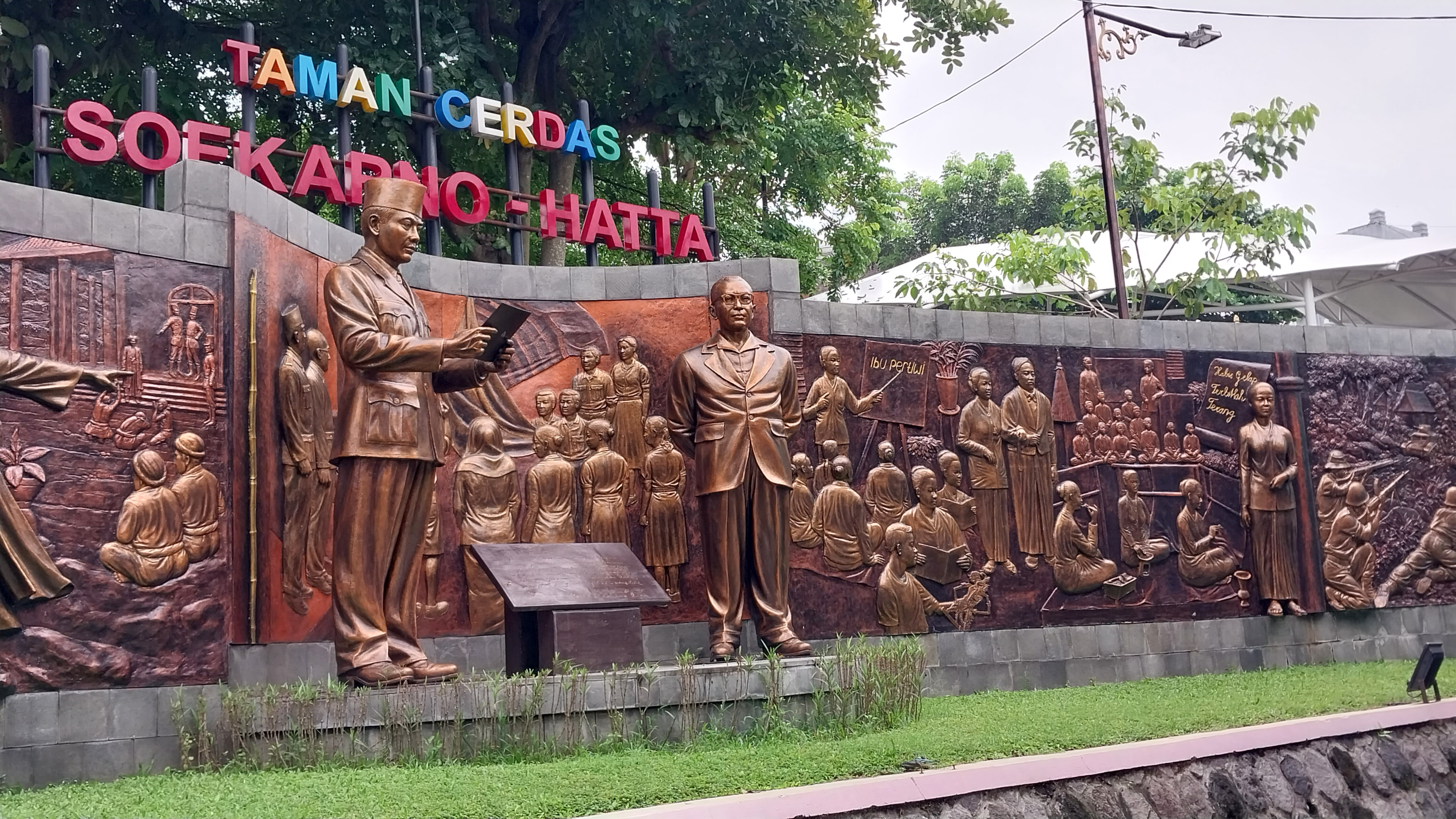
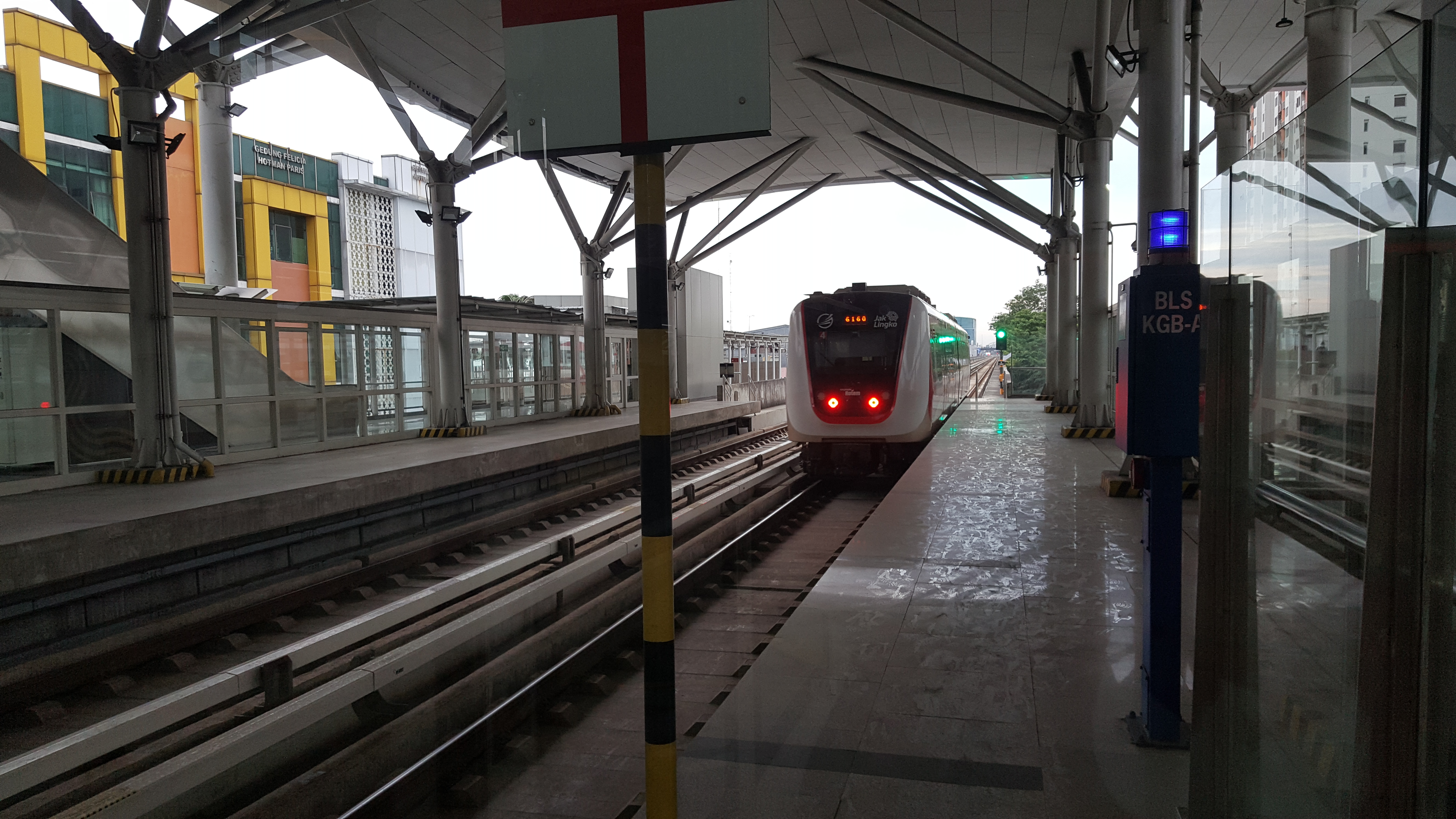
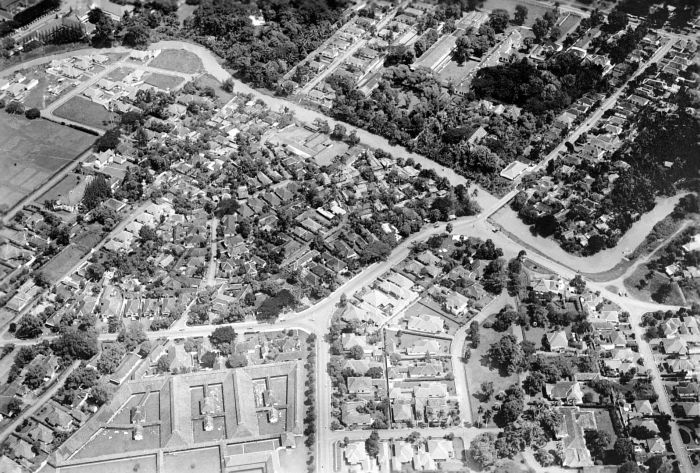
- Interactive map of Pegangsaan
- Coordinates: 6°12′S 106°51′E
- Country: Indonesia
- Province: DKI Jakarta
- Administrative city: Central Jakarta
- District: Menteng
- Postal code: 10320

Pegangsaan is an administrative village in the Menteng district of Indonesia. It has a postal code of 10320. This administrative village is also known as the location of the house where the Proclamation of Indonesian Independence was read. It is bordered by Ciliwung River on its east and south.

== See also ==
- Menteng
- List of administrative villages of Jakarta
