= Cideng, Gambir =

Cideng
- Village
- Location within Jakarta
- Coordinates: 6.1732°S 106.8086°E
- Country: Indonesia
- Province: Jakarta
- Administrative city: Central Jakarta
- District: Gambir
- Postal code: 10150

Cideng is a village in the Gambir district of Jakarta. It has a postal code of 10150.

During the Pacific War, Cideng was the location of the Japanese-run internment camp Tjideng, where as many as 10,500 European women and children were held captive by the war's end.

== See also ==
- List of administrative villages of Jakarta
