= Gambir, Gambir =

Gambir
- Administrative village
- Location in Jakarta
- Coordinates: 6°10′S 106°49′E
- Country: Indonesia
- Province: Jakarta
- Administrative city: Central Jakarta
- District: Gambir
- Postal code: 10110

Gambir is an administrative village in the Gambir district of Jakarta, Indonesia. It has a postal code of 10110.

== See also ==
- List of administrative villages of Jakarta
