= Duri Kosambi, Cengkareng =

Duri Kosambi
- Village
- Location in Jakarta
- Coordinates: 6.1721148°S 106.7205154°E
- Country: Indonesia
- Province: Jakarta
- City: West Jakarta
- District: Cengkareng

Area
  - Total: 5.91 km^{2} (2.28 sq mi)

Population (2023)
  - Total: 103,836
  - Density: 17,600/km^{2} (45,500/sq mi)
- Postal code: 11750

Duri Kosambi is an administrative village (kelurahan) in the Cengkareng district of Indonesia. It has postal code of 11750.

== Etymology ==
The area received its name from a plantation of Macassar oil-producing Schleichera oleosa trees, known locally as Kosambi, which used to occupy the area. The trees were known to be thorny, hence the term Duri ("thorn" in Indonesian).

== Demographics and geography ==
Statistics Indonesia estimated the administrative village's population in 2023 as 103,836. It covers an area of 5.91 square kilometres (2.28 sq mi), and borders the district of Kalideres in Tangerang to its south.

== See also ==
- Cengkareng
- List of administrative villages of Jakarta
