= Cempaka Putih Barat =

- Administrative village
- Interactive map of Cempaka Putih Barat
- Country: Indonesia
- Province: DKI Jakarta
- Administrative city: Central Jakarta
- District: Cempaka Putih
- Postal code: 10520

Cempaka Putih Barat is an administrative village in the Cempaka Putih district of Indonesia. It has a postal code of 10520.

== See also ==
- List of administrative villages of Jakarta
