= Kebon Kelapa, Gambir =

Kebon Kelapa
- Administrative village
- Interactive map of Kebon Kelapa
- Country: Indonesia
- Province: DKI Jakarta
- Administrative city: Central Jakarta
- District: Gambir

Area
  - Total: 0.7810 km^{2} (0.3015 sq mi)

Population
  - Total: 11,402
  - Density: 14,600/km^{2} (37,810/sq mi)
- Postal code: 10120

Kebon Kelapa is an administrative village in the Gambir district of Indonesia. It has a postal code a 10120. The village had an area of 78.10 hectares (193.0 acres; 0.3015 sq mi).

== See also ==
- List of administrative villages of Jakarta
