= Gunung Sahari Utara =

- Administrative village
- Interactive map of Gunung Sahari Utara
- Country: Indonesia
- Province: DKI Jakarta
- Administrative city: Central Jakarta
- District: Sawah Besar
- Postal code: 10720

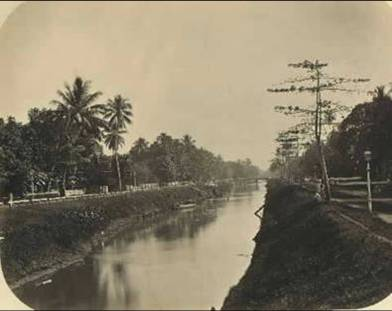
A photograph of a river in Gunung Sahari Tempo Doeloe

Gunung Sahari Utara is an administrative village in the Sawah Besar district of Indonesia. It has postal code of 10720.

== See also ==
- List of administrative villages of Jakarta
