= Serdang, Kemayoran =

Serdang
- Administrative village
- Interactive map of Serdang
- Coordinates: 6°09′31″S 106°51′40″E
- Country: Indonesia
- Province: DKI Jakarta
- Administrative city: Central Jakarta
- District: Kemayoran
- Postal code: 10650

Serdang is an administrative village in the Kemayoran district of Jakarta, Indonesia. It has a postal code of 10650.

== See also ==
- List of administrative villages of Jakarta
