= Gunung Sahari Selatan, Kemayoran =

Gunung Sahari Selatan
- Administrative village
- Interactive map of Gunung Sahari Selatan
- Country: Indonesia
- Province: DKI Jakarta
- Administrative city: Central Jakarta
- District: Kemayoran
- Postal code: 10610

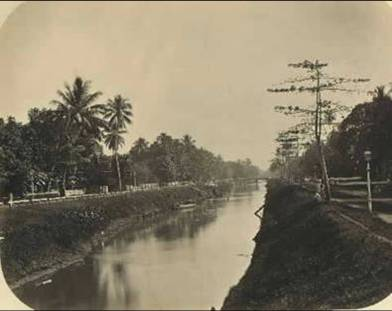
Gunung Sahari in the past

Gunung Sahari Selatan is an administrative village in the Kemayoran district of Indonesia. It has a postal code of 10610.

== See also ==
- List of administrative villages of Jakarta
