= List of districts of Jakarta =

The Special Capital Region of Jakarta in Indonesia is divided into 5 administrative cities and one regency, which in turn are divided into kecamatan or districts, and subsequently kelurahan or subdistricts. In total, there are 44 districts and 267 subdistricts in Jakarta, a number that has remained constant since the most recent administrative change in 2001. South Jakarta and East Jakarta are tied with the largest number of districts with 10 each, while the Thousand Islands Regency has the least with just 2.

== Administrative cities ==
=== Central Jakarta ===
Central Jakarta consists of 8 districts and 44 subdistricts with area code 10110 to 10750. The list is as follows:

Kemendagri code	District	Number of subdistricts	Subdistrict
31.71.05	Cempaka Putih	3	Cempaka Putih Barat; Cempaka Putih Timur; Rawasari
31.71.01	Gambir	6	Cideng; Duri Pulo; Gambir; Kebon Kelapa; Petojo Selatan; Petojo Utara
31.71.08	Johar Baru	4	Galur; Johar Baru; Kampung Rawa; Tanah Tinggi
31.71.03	Kemayoran	8	Cempaka Baru; Gunung Sahari Selatan; Harapan Mulya; Kebon Kosong; Kemayoran; Serdang; Sumur Batu; Utan Panjang
31.71.06	Menteng	5	Cikini; Gondangdia; Kebon Sirih; Menteng; Pegangsaan
31.71.02	Sawah Besar	5	Gunung Sahari Utara; Karang Anyar; Kartini; Mangga Dua Selatan; Pasar Baru
31.71.04	Senen	6	Bungur; Kenari; Kramat; Kwitang; Paseban; Senen
31.71.07	Tanah Abang	7	Bendungan Hilir; Gelora; Kampung Bali; Karet Tengsin; Kebon Kacang; Kebon Melati; Petamburan
	TOTAL	44	

=== North Jakarta ===
North Jakarta consists of 6 districts and 32 subdistricts with area code 14110 to 14470. The list is as follows:

Kemendagri code	District	Number of subdistricts	Subdistrict
31.72.04	Cilincing	7	Cilincing; Kalibaru; Marunda; Rorotan; Semper Barat; Semper Timur; Sukapura
31.72.06	Kelapa Gading	3	Kelapa Gading Barat; Kelapa Gading Timur; Pegangsaan Dua
31.72.03	Koja	6	Koja; Lagoa; Rawa Badak Selatan; Rawa Badak Utara; Tugu Selatan; Tugu Utara
31.72.05	Pademangan	3	Ancol; Pademangan Barat; Pademangan Timur
31.72.01	Penjaringan	5	Kamal Muara; Kapuk Muara; Pejagalan; Penjaringan; Pluit
31.72.02	Tanjung Priok	7	Kebon Bawang; Papanggo; Sungai Bambu; Sunter Agung; Sunter Jaya; Tanjung Priok; Warakas
	TOTAL	31	

=== East Jakarta ===
East Jakarta consists of 10 districts and 65 subdistricts with area code 13110 to 13960. The list is as follows:

Kemendagri code	District	Number of subdistricts	Subdistrict
31.75.06	Cakung	7	Cakung Barat; Cakung Timur; Jatinegara; Penggilingan; Pulo Gebang; Rawa Terate; Ujung Menteng
31.75.10	Cipayung	8	Bambu Apus; Ceger; Cilangkap; Cipayung; Lubang Buaya; Munjul; Pondok Ranggon; Setu
31.75.09	Ciracas	5	Cibubur; Ciracas; Kelapa Dua Wetan; Rambutan; Susukan
31.75.07	Duren Sawit	7	Duren Sawit; Klender; Malaka Jaya; Malaka Sari; Pondok Bambu; Pondok Kelapa; Pondok Kopi
31.75.03	Jatinegara	8	Bali Mester; Bidara Cina; Cipinang Besar Selatan; Cipinang Besar Utara; Cipinang Cempedak; Cipinang Muara; Kampung Melayu; Rawa Bunga
31.75.04	Kramat Jati	7	Balekambang; Batu Ampar; Cawang; Cililitan; Dukuh; Kramat Jati; Tengah
31.75.08	Makasar	5	Cipinang Melayu; Halim Perdana Kusuma; Kebon Pala; Makasar; Pinang Ranti
31.75.01	Matraman	6	Kayu Manis; Kebon Manggis; Palmeriam; Pisangan Baru; Utan Kayu Selatan; Utan Kayu Utara
31.75.05	Pasar Rebo	5	Baru; Cijantung; Gedong; Kalisari; Pekayon
31.75.02	Pulo Gadung	7	Cipinang; Jati; Jatinegara Kaum; Kayu Putih; Pisangan Timur; Pulo Gadung; Rawamangun
	TOTAL	65	

=== West Jakarta ===
West Jakarta consists of 8 districts and 56 subdistricts with area code 11710 to 11850. The list is as follows:

Kemendagri code	District	Number of subdistricts	Subdistrict
31.73.01	Cengkareng	6	Cengkareng Barat; Cengkareng Timur; Duri Kosambi; Kapuk; Kedaung Kali Angke; Rawa Buaya
31.73.02	Grogol Petamburan	7	Grogol; Jelambar Baru; Jelambar; Tanjung Duren Selatan; Tanjung Duren Utara; Tomang; Wijaya Kusuma
31.73.03	Taman Sari	8	Glodok; Keagungan; Krukut; Mangga Besar; Maphar; Pinangsia; Taman Sari; Tangki
31.73.04	Tambora	11	Angke; Duri Selatan; Duri Utara; Jembatan Besi; Jembatan Lima; Kali Anyar; Krendang; Pekojan; Roa Malaka; Tambora; Tanah Sereal
31.73.05	Kebon Jeruk	7	Duri Kepa; Kebon Jeruk; Kedoya Selatan; Kedoya Utara; Kelapa Dua; Sukabumi Selatan; Sukabumi Utara
31.73.06	Kalideres	5	Kalideres; Kamal; Pegadungan; Semanan; Tegal Alur
31.73.07	Palmerah	6	Jatipulo; Kemanggisan; Kota Bambu Selatan; Kota Bambu Utara; Palmerah; Slipi
31.73.08	Kembangan	6	Joglo; Kembangan Selatan; Kembangan Utara; Meruya Selatan; Meruya Utara; Srengseng
	TOTAL	56	

=== South Jakarta ===
South Jakarta consists of 10 districts and 65 subdistricts with area code 12110 to 12980. The list is as follows:

Kemendagri code	District	Number of subdistricts	Subdistrict
31.74.06	Cilandak	5	Cilandak Barat; Cipete Selatan; Gandaria Selatan; Lebak Bulus; Pondok Labu
31.74.09	Jagakarsa	6	Ciganjur; Cipedak; Jagakarsa; Lenteng Agung; Srengseng Sawah; Tanjung Barat
31.74.07	Kebayoran Baru	10	Cipete Utara; Gandaria Utara; Gunung; Kramat Pela; Melawai; Petogogan; Pulo; Rawa Barat; Selong; Senayan
31.74.05	Kebayoran Lama	6	Cipulir; Grogol Selatan; Grogol Utara; Kebayoran Lama Selatan; Kebayoran Lama Utara; Pondok Pinang
31.74.03	Mampang Prapatan	5	Bangka; Kuningan Barat; Mampang Prapatan; Pela Mampang; Tegal Parang
31.74.08	Pancoran	6	Cikoko; Duren Tiga; Kalibata; Pancoran; Pengadegan; Rawajati
31.74.04	Pasar Minggu	7	Cilandak Timur; Jati Padang; Kebagusan; Pasar Minggu; Pejaten Barat; Pejaten Timur; Ragunan
31.74.10	Pesanggrahan	5	Bintaro; Pesanggrahan; Petukangan Selatan; Petukangan Utara; Ulujami
31.74.02	Setiabudi	8	Guntur; Karet Kuningan; Karet Semanggi; Karet; Kuningan Timur; Menteng Atas; Pasar Manggis; Setiabudi
31.74.01	Tebet	7	Bukit Duri; Kebon Baru; Manggarai Selatan; Manggarai; Menteng Dalam; Tebet Barat; Tebet Timur
	TOTAL	65	

== Regency ==
=== Thousand Islands ===
Kemendagri code	District	Number of subdistricts	Subdistrict
31.01.01	North Thousand Islands	3	Harapan Island; Kelapa Island; Panggang Island
31.01.02	South Thousand Islands	3	Pari Island; Tidung Island; Untung Jawa Island
	TOTAL	6	
