= Chempaka =

Chempaka may refer to:

- Chempaka (Kelantan state constituency), a constituency in the Kelantan State Legislative Assembly in Malaysia
- Chempaka (Selangor state constituency), a former constituency in the Selangor State Legislative Assembly in Malaysia
- Chempaka (film), a 1947 Malay-language film by B. S. Rajhans

== See also ==
- Cempaka (disambiguation)
