= Jelambar Baru =

- Administrative village
- Interactive map of Jelambar Baru
- Coordinates: 6°09′S 106°47′E
- Country: Indonesia
- Province: Jakarta
- City: West Jakarta
- District: Grogol Petamburan
- Postal code: 11460

Jelambar Baru is an administrative village in the Grogol Petamburan district of Indonesia. It has postal code of 11460.
