= Cempaka diamond mine =

Diamond mine in Indonesia

Cempaka mine
- Location: Kalimantan, Indonesia
- Products: Diamond

The Cempaka mine is one of the largest diamond mines in Indonesia and in the world. It's one of the oldest known sources of diamonds globally. The mine is located in South Kalimantan, Borneo and is the only diamond deposit in Kalimantan that has been mined on a commercial scale. The mine has estimated reserves of 32.9 million carats of diamonds. Frequent land slides are a problem.

The Gem Diamonds Group placed the Cempaka diamond mine on care and maintenance in 2009. Subsequent limited public news and data from the Kimberley Process regarding Indonesian diamond production and export, suggests the mine has not yet restarted commercial production.
