= Johar Baru =

District in Central Jakarta, Indonesia

- District
- Interactive map of Johar Baru
- Country: Indonesia
- Province: Jakarta
- Administrative city: Central Jakarta

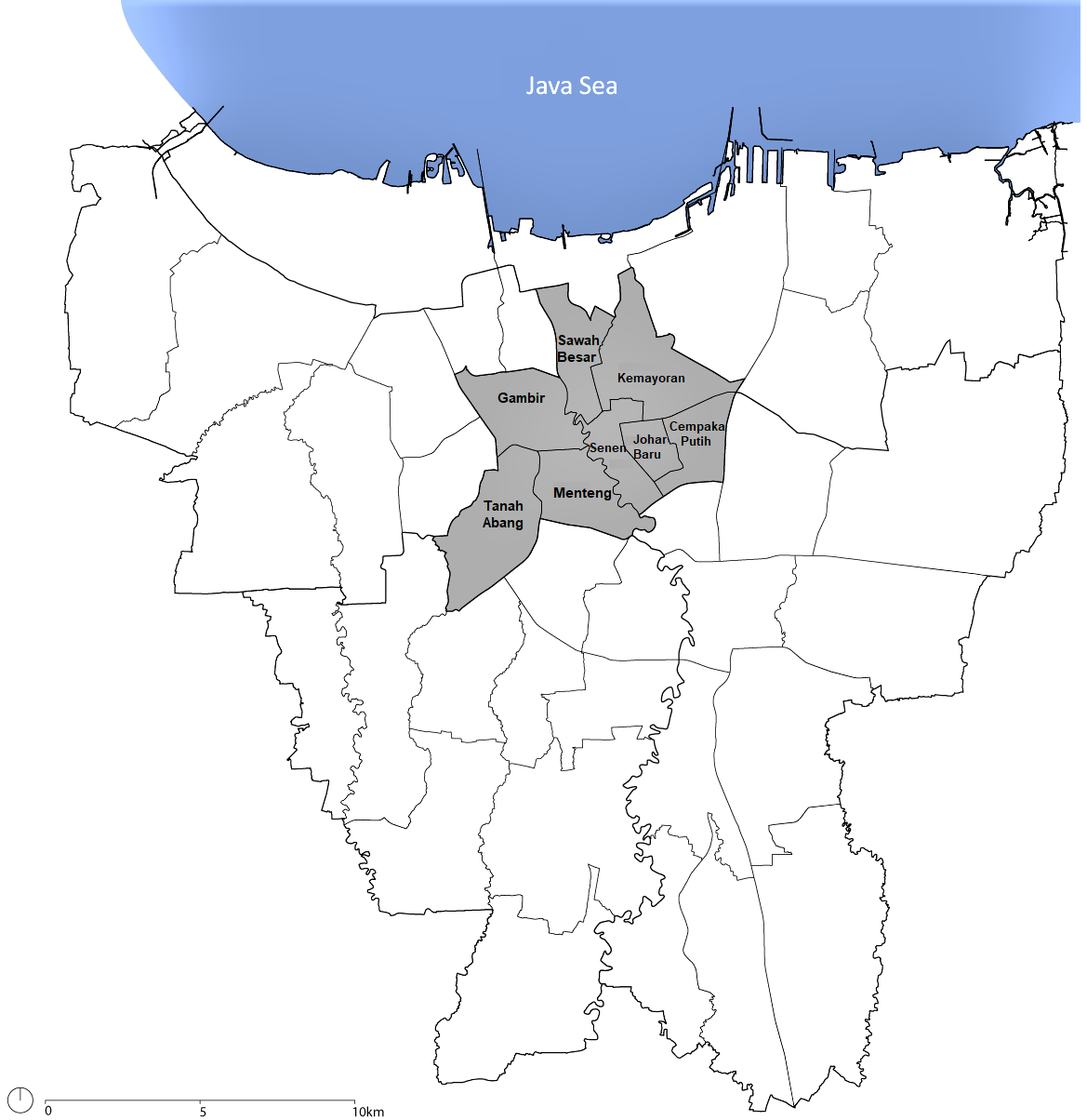
Map of this small district, grey, south-east, but a more central comparator to another (namely the ex-quarter or so of the south-eastern district of Cempaka Putih). Click for broader map and to enable varied magnification.

Johar Baru is a district (Indonesian: kecamatan) in the administrative city of Central Jakarta, Indonesia. It is roughly bounded by Kampung Rawa Selatan Raya road and Mardani Raya road to the east, Percetakan Negara Raya Road to the south, Letjend Suprapto Road to the north, and a railway line to the west.

== History ==
This was formerly part of Cempaka Putih which formed a neat south-eastern corner rectangle to the city centre. Thus at first, the latter was seven Administrative Villages: Cempaka Putih Timur, Cempaka Putih Barat, Galur, Tanah Tinggi, Kampung Rawa, Johor Baru, and Rawasari. In 1993, those of Galur, Tanah Tinggi, Kampung Rawa, and Johar Baru became Rahabayan Johar Baru.

== Kelurahan (Administrative Village) ==
The district of Johar Baru is divided into four administrative villages (kelurahan):

- Galur - area code 10530
- Tanah Tinggi - area code 10540
- Kampung Rawa - area code 10550
- Johar Baru - area code 10560

== List of important places ==
- Kawasan Departemen Kesehatan (Health Department Complex)
