= Kemayoran =

- District
- Kecamatan Kemayoran
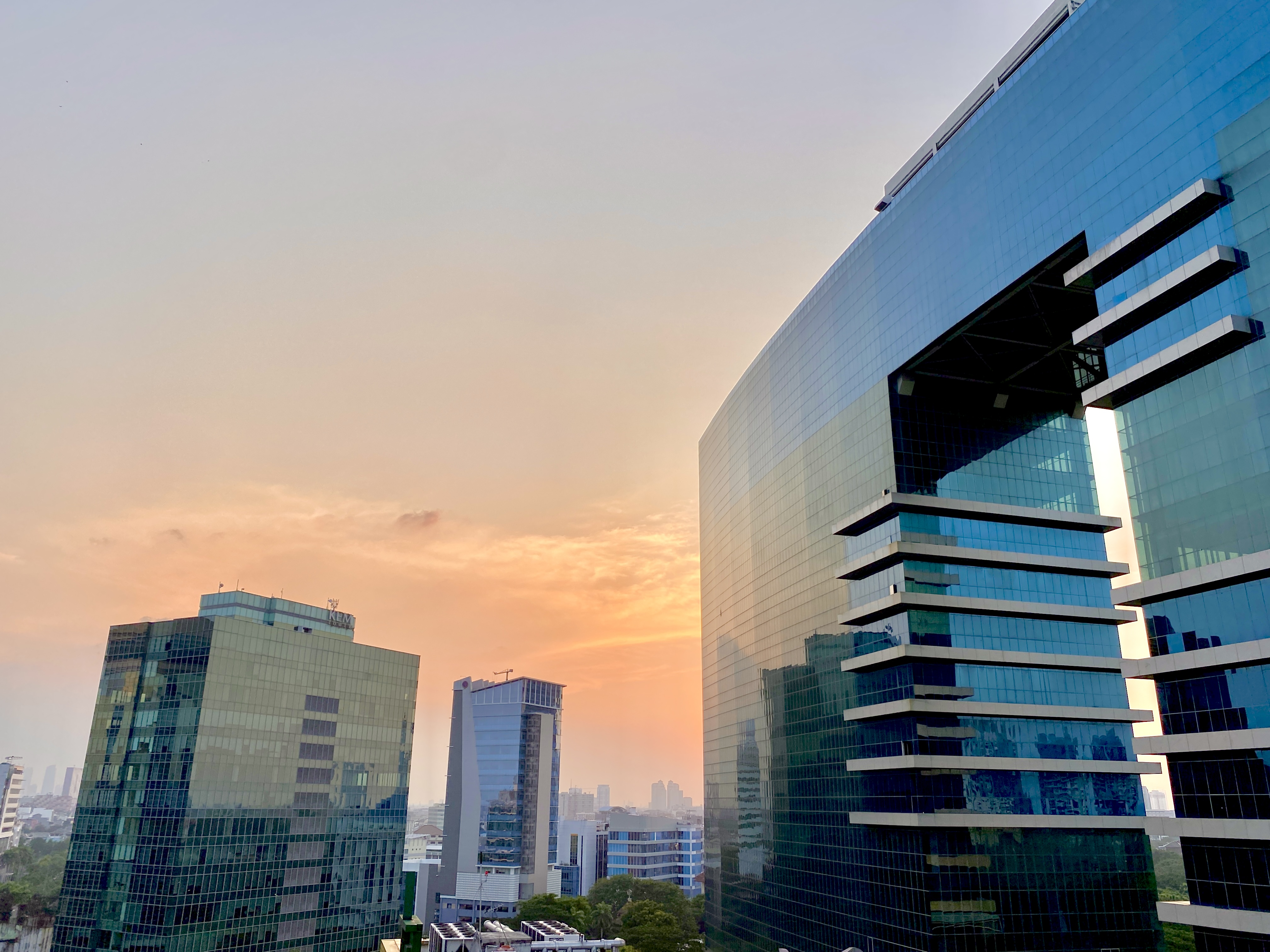
- Kemayoran Skyline
- Interactive map of Kemayoran
- Country: Indonesia
- Province: Special Capital City District of Jakarta
- City: Central Jakarta
- Postal code: 106XX

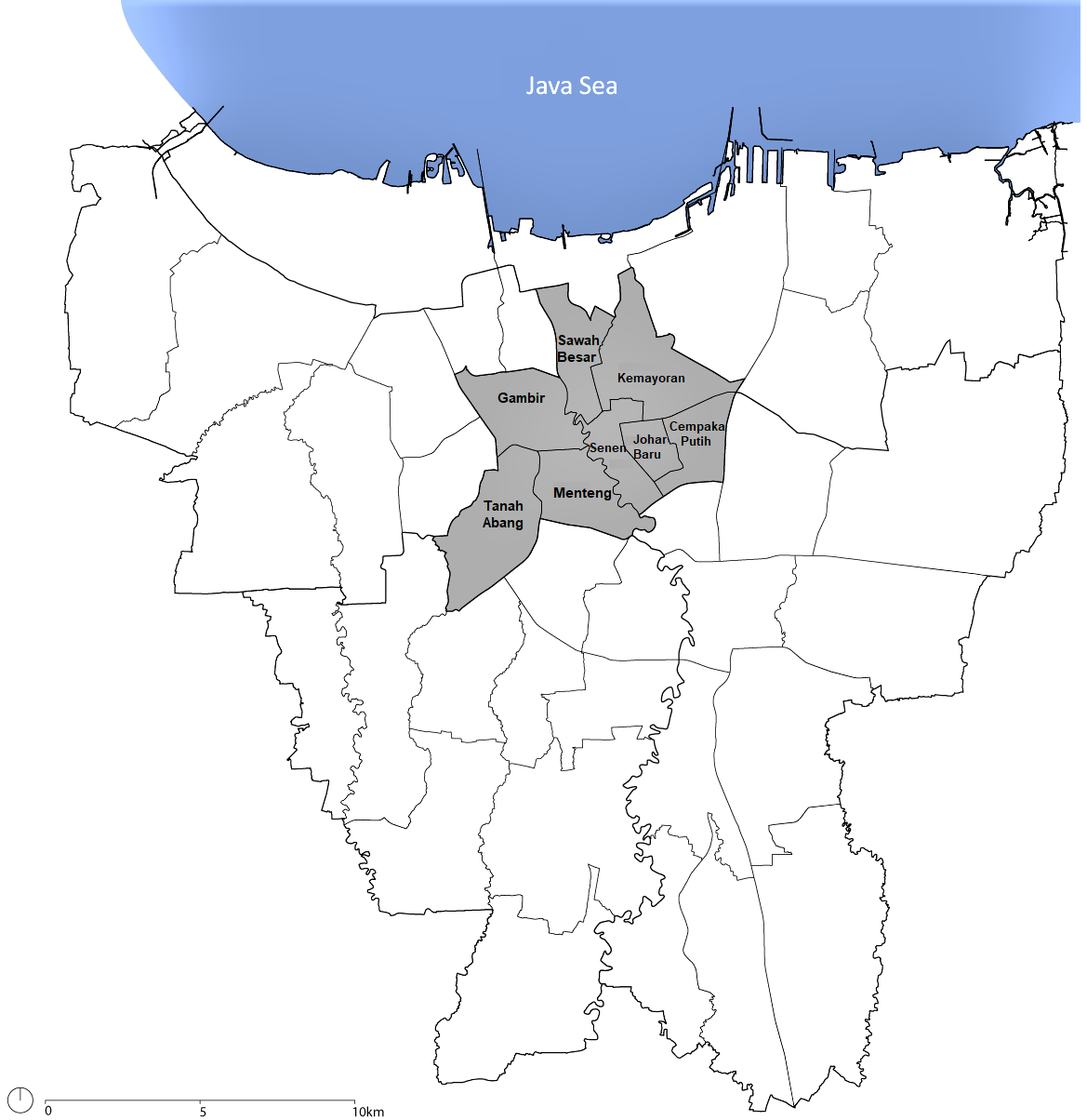
Map of the district and others. Click for broader map and to enable varied magnification.

Kemayoran is a district (kecamatan) of Central Jakarta, Jakarta in Indonesia. It was best known for the former Kemayoran Airport and it has been transforming as a new central business district. As of 2023, it consists of numerous four and five-star hotels, restaurants, premium office towers, hospitals as well as shopping and entertainment centers. Kemayoran is also home to the Jakarta Fair, the largest and longest fair in Southeast Asia that attracts more than 4 million visitors annually.

Kemayoran is between Jalan M.H. Thamrin, Ancol Dreamland, and the Port of Tanjung Priok. Its proximity between Jakarta's primary central business district, a Southeast Asian tourist hotspot, and one of the busiest ports in the world, has made Kemayoran a prime real estate for many local and foreign investors. Moreover, Kemayoran is 20 20-minute journey from Soekarno-Hatta International Airport.

Kemayoran is serviced by Trans-Java Toll Road, which traverses the island of Java. As of 2022, the government has finished the construction of the Light Rail Transit (LRT) station in Kemayoran with the rest of Jakarta by that means.

== Villages ==
The district of Kemayoran comprises eight urban villages (kelurahan), having the postal/zip/area codes as follows:

Gunung Sahari Selatan	10610
Kemayoran	10620
Kebon Kosong	10630
Cempaka Baru	10640
Harapan Mulya	10640
Sumur Batu	10640
Serdang	10650
Utan Panjang	10650

== History ==
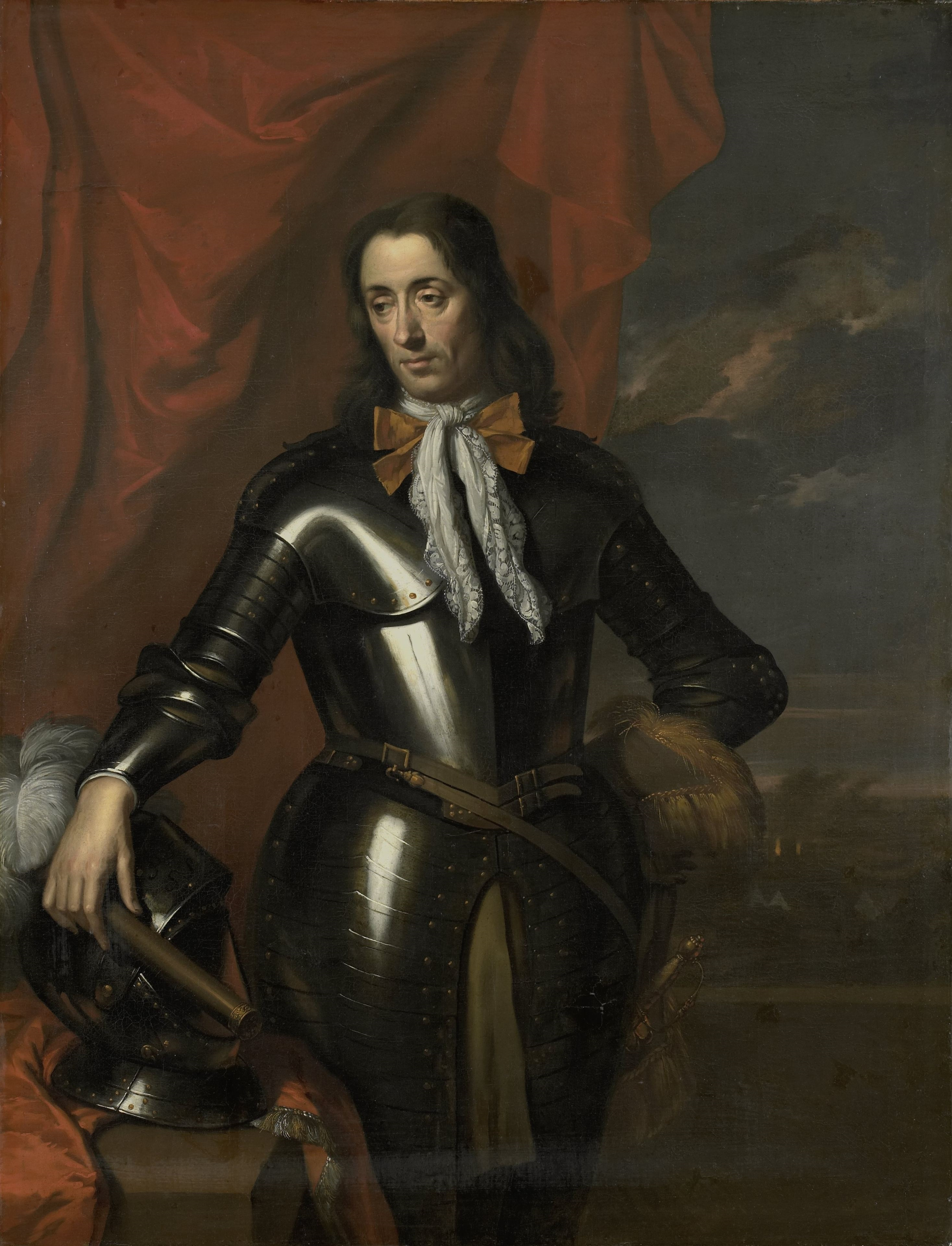
Isaac de l'Ostal de Saint-Martin attributed to Jan de Baen, the landlord of several areas in Java, including Kemayoran in what is now Jakarta.

Even though the area that was known as Batavia stretches from Tangerang to Bogor, physical development is still limited to the area near the city center around the Sunda Kelapa harbor area. Limitations of this development is partly due to the condition of Batavia being a walled city with fortifications because of many attacks from local Sultanates to seize Batavia, as well as because of the centralized system of the government. Only in 1810 that the city wall of Batavia was demolished, during the reign of Daendels. Meanwhile, rural areas and suburbs of Batavia are still largely 'untouched' with several native villages. These rural areas were later shared to several landlords, one of which is the area that is now known as Kemayoran.

The area that was known as Kemayoran was formerly land owned by the Dutch East India Company commander, Isaac de l'Ostal de Saint-Martin (ca. 1629–96). At the end of the 17th century, Isaac owned a large area in Java, which includes the area that is now Kemayoran, part of Ancol, Krukut at Tegalangus, and Cinere. Isaac held the title major, which is where the name Kemayoran comes from. The name is Mayoran first appeared in Java Government Gazette on February 24, 1816, described as "a land close to Weltevreden". Later, the area was known as Kemayoran until now.

Until the early 20th century, Kemayoran was still dominated by swamps and paddies with small settlements. Administratively, Kemayoran was a Weekmeester governed by a Bek ("Defender"). After the independence of Indonesia, Kemayoran became part of the Sawah Besar district in Penjaringan, Jakarta Raya. From 1963 to 1968, Kemayoran was part of the district of Senen in Jakarta Raya. Ever since 1968, Kemayoran became a district of Central Jakarta.

At first, the inhabitants of Kemayoran were natives from a mixture of several ethnic groups from the local kingdom of Pajajaran, Demak, Mataram, and several foreign nations who arrived as immigrants. After the Dutch occupied, there were immigrants from China, India, Sumatra, and East Indonesia that were used as workers for the expansion and development of Batavia or to participate in military service against Sultan Hasanuddin and Sultan Agung of Mataram.

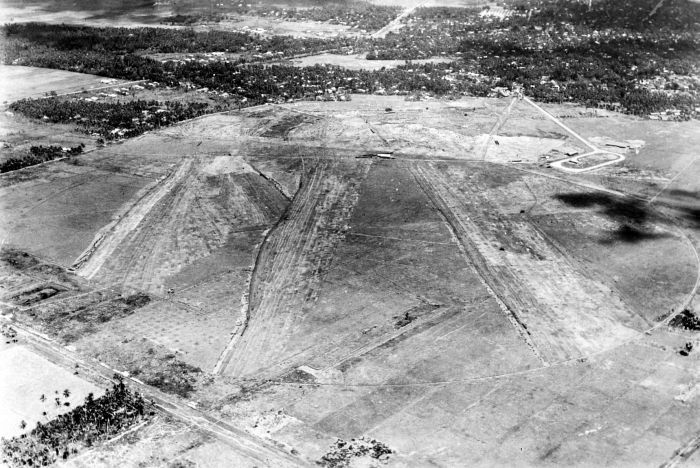
The construction of Kemayoran Airport in Kemayoran.

Under the government of Daendels, to collect funds for the construction of the new Anyer-Panarukan road, some lands were sold to private owners. Generally, the buyers were of Dutch, Chinese, and Arabic origin. Among them were Roosendaal, H. Hussein Madani (Indo-Dutch), Abdullah, and De Groof. These landlords had the power to regulate land from users, who were the indigenous population and serfs. After slavery was abolished, these people became farmers who worked for the landlords, then the landlords would determine the taxes to be paid.

In 1903, Batavia moved to a decentralized form of government, which marked the period of modern colonialism in Batavia. Many lands are repaired, canals are constructed, and the city is expanded. Lands were purchased for the expansion of the city, which included the settlements of Kemayoran, Petojo, Jatibaru, Cideng, Kramat, and Tanah Tinggi. These lands were allocated to lower-middle-class people. More affluent citizens such as the Dutch people and other higher class people live closer to the center, such as in the Menteng residential area.

Many of the people who resided in Kemayoran were Indo people (mixed Dutch and Indonesian). Most of them lived in Jl. Garuda. Even after World War II, many former Dutch soldiers settled in Kemayoran. Around the 1930s, Kemayoran was known as a settlement of the Indo people, giving rise to a new nickname for Kemayoran, "Belanda Kemayoran" (roughly translates to Kemayoran Netherlands). After Indonesian independence, a wave of urban migrants arrived in Kemayoran and Jakarta from various regions in Indonesia such as West Java, Central Java, Sumatra, Kalimantan, East Nusa Tenggara, and West Nusa Tenggara. Because of this, Kemayoran transformed into a more crowded settlement.

In 1935, Kemayoran Airport was opened. This started to change the economy of Kemayoran from agriculture to service, but many areas of Kemayoran were still sparsely distributed settlements with vacant land. With the opening of the Soekarno-Hatta International Airport and the closure of the Kemayoran Airport, Kemayoran was able to be transformed into the new central business district of Jakarta. Since then, many entertainment centres, hotels, and offices have been built. The government added numerous infrastructure such as the Light rail and Trans-Java Toll Road, to support the rapid growth of the central business district of Kemayoran.

== Kota Baru Bandara Kemayoran ==
In 1986, Kemayoran Airport was officially closed. Under the 2015-2019 National Medium-Term Long-Term Development Plan (RPJMN), the Ministry of Public Works and Public Housing (PUPR) proposed Kemayoran to become an area that had the opportunity to become a new city. The area that was formerly an airport was gradually turned into other developments such as Jakarta International Expo and Kotabaru Bandar Kemayoran (both of these were located in Pademangan District in North Jakarta instead of Kemayoran District in Central Jakarta. Kemayoran Planning and Development Center (PPK) is responsible for the development as well as monitoring of the area.

Kota Baru has an area of 454 hectares. At present, there are several vertical residential designation blocks, office blocks, hospitals, shopping center blocks as well as five and four-star hotels. There is also an urban park of 22.3 hectares area which has a lake, a mangrove area, an amphitheater, viewing towers, jogging tracks, and a hanging bridge.

== Government and infrastructure ==
Government agencies with head offices in Kemayoran include the National Search and Rescue Agency.

== Culture ==
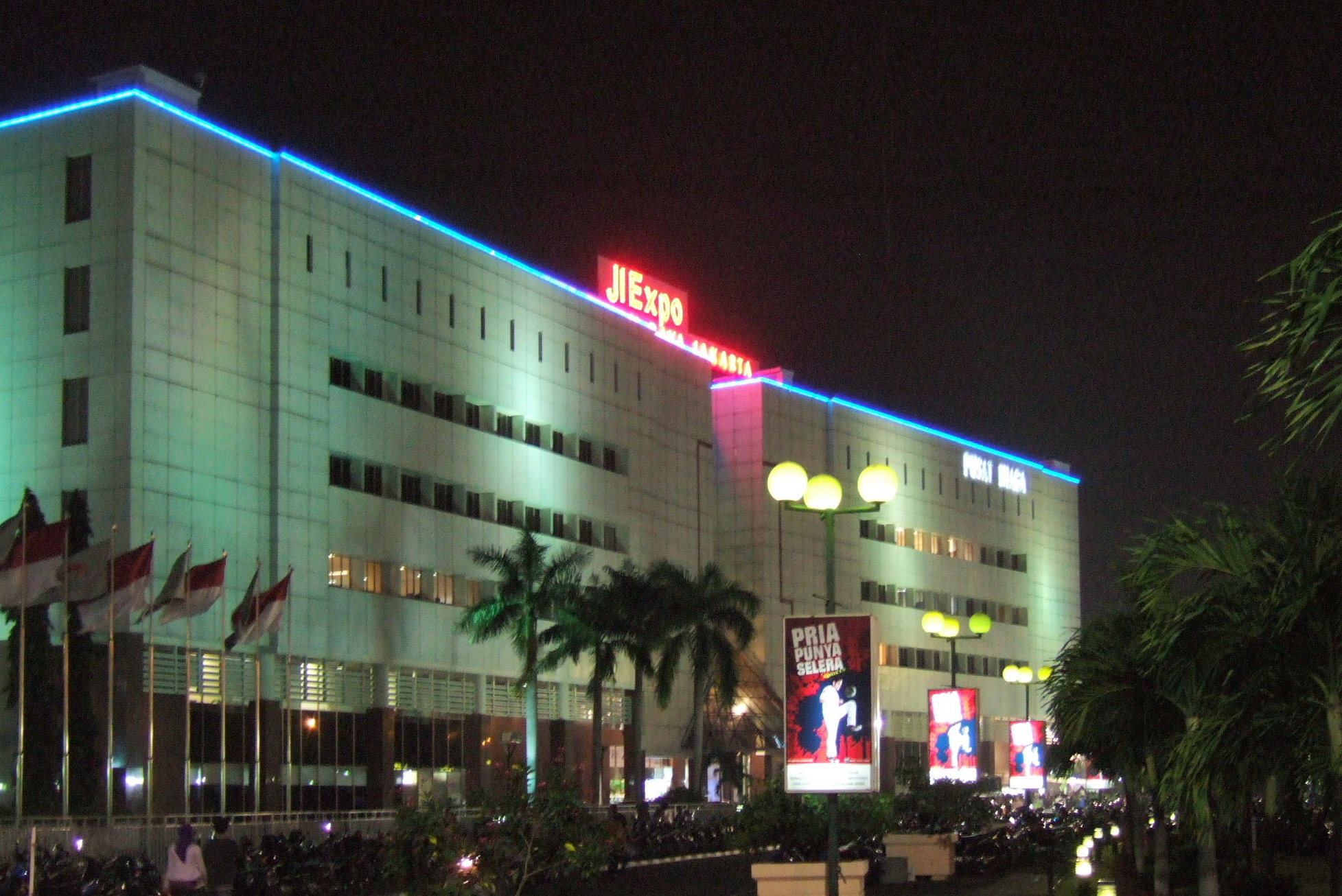
Jakarta International Expo Kemayoran main building is actually located in Pademangan district, but is associated with Kemayoran district due to its location in the former area of the historic Kemayoran city, and its close proximity with Kemayoran.

Many indigenous cultures, especially the Betawi culture, flourished in Kemayoran. Among them is the kroncong music, a mixture of indigenous music and Portuguese fado music. Kroncong Tugu, a variation of kroncong that originally came from Tugu (about 12 km east of present-day Jakarta), is a variation that is closely associated with Kemayoran. Because of rapid development, Kemayoran has transformed into a modern city itself. Consequently, cultural values such as the Betawi culture are threatened.

Gambang music also developed in Kemayoran under the influence of China. The variation of gambang that developed in Kemayoran is often called Gambang Kemayoran and it is not referred to as Gambang Kromong because the kromong (a kind of percussion) is not used. Songs that were popular at the time included Onde-onde, Si Jongkong Kopyor, and Kapal Karem.

The Wayang Kulit of Kemayoran originates from Javanese influences. The main difference is that the language used is the Betawi language instead of the Javanese language. During the colonial era, Wayang Kulit was usually performed at ceremonies such as wedding ceremonies, circumcision ceremonies, and New Year parties.

One of the popular artists associated with Kemayoran theater is Benyamin Sueb.

Pencak silat, a martial art of the Betawi people, also became popular in Kemayoran. Styles of pencak silat developed in Kemayoran area are Beksi, Cingkrik, Si tembak, Sin lam ba, and Kolong meja. Until the late 80's, it is a common routine for children to practice pencak silat after the Isha prayers.

During the 1990s, much of the traditional art and culture of Betawi characteristic of Kemayoran slowly disappeared.

== Folklore ==
There are many folklores associated with Kemayoran, usually involving the conflict between the indigenous people of Kemayoran and the Dutch kompeni (local term for Dutch East India Company who applied huge taxes to the local people.) One of the popular heroes from the legend is Murtado "Si Macan Kemayoran" ("the Kemayoran Tiger") who protected the Kemayoran village area against the Dutch East India Company henchmen and the local bully who oppressed the villagers.

== Transportation ==
Kemayoran can be reached by bus, train, taxi, or Angkot. Kemayoran station of KRL Commuterline is located in the area. The area is served by Transjakarta Corridor 12 and 14.

== List of important places ==
- Kemayoran Athletes Village
- Kemayoran railway station
- Southern part of Kemayoran Airport
