= Central Jakarta =

Administrative and De Facto Capital city in Jakarta, Indonesia

Coordinates: 6.1864°S 106.8294°E

Central Jakarta Jakarta Pusat
- Administrative City of Central Jakarta; Kota Administrasi Jakarta Pusat

Other transcription(s)
  - Betawi: Jakartè Belah Tengah
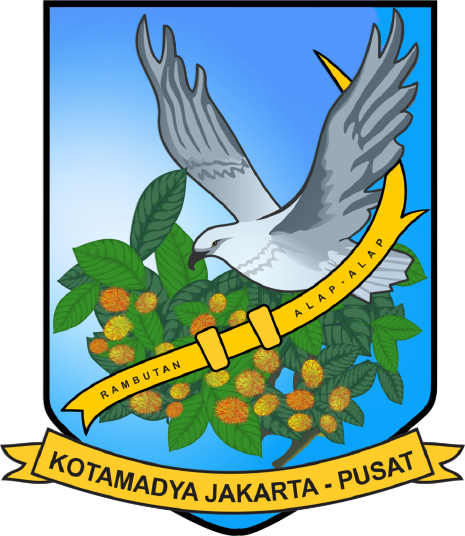
- Seal
- Interactive map of Central Jakarta
- Country: Indonesia
- Special Region: Jakarta

Government
  - Mayor: Arifin
  - Vice Mayor: Eric Phahlevi Zakaria Lumbun

Area
  - Total: 48.13 km^{2} (18.58 sq mi)

Population (mid 2025 estimate)
  - Total: 1,051,077
  - Density: 21,840/km^{2} (56,560/sq mi)
- Time zone: UTC+7 (WIB)
- Vehicle registration: B xxxx Pxx
- HDI (2025): ▲0.8445 (21th) very high
- Website: pusat.jakarta.go.id

Central Jakarta (Indonesian: Jakarta Pusat, Betawi: Jakarté Bèlah Tengah), abbreviated as Jakpus, is one of the five administrative cities (kota administrasi) and de facto Capital City of the Special Capital Region of Jakarta. It had 902,973 inhabitants according to the 2010 census and 1,056,896 at the 2020 census; the official estimate as of mid 2025 was 1,051,077 (comprising 527,565 males and 523,512 females). Central Jakarta is not self-governed and does not have a city council, hence it is not classified as a proper municipality.

Central Jakarta is the smallest in area and population of the five administrative cities of Jakarta. It is both the administrative and political center of Jakarta and Indonesia. Central Jakarta contains several large international hotels and major landmarks such as Hotel Indonesia.

== Administrative districts ==
Central Jakarta Administrative City (Kota Administrasi Jakarta Pusat) is bounded by North Jakarta to the north, East Jakarta to the east, South Jakarta to the south, and West Jakarta to the west. It is subdivided into eight districts (kecamatan), listed below with their areas and their populations at the 2010 census and 2020 Census, together with the official estimates as of mid 2025. The table also includes the locations of the district administrative centres, and the number of administrative villages (all classed as urban kelurahan) in each district, together with their names and postcodes.

Kode Kemendagri	Name of District (kecamatan)	Area in km^{2}	Pop'n 2010 census	Pop'n 2020 census	Pop'n mid 2025 estimate	Pop'n density 2025 (/km^{2})	Admin centre	No. of villages	Villages kelurahan (with post codes)
31.71.07	Tanah Abang	9.30	144,459	175,150	162,546	17,478	Kebon Melati	7	Bendungan Hilir (10210), Gelora (10270), Kampung Bali (10250), Karet Tengsin (10220), Kebon Kacang (10240), Kebon Melati (10230), Petamburan (10260)
31.71.06	Menteng	6.53	68,309	80,319	84,627	12,960	Menteng	5	Cikini (10330), Gondangdia (10350), Kebon Sirih (10340), Menteng (10310), Pegangsaan (10320)
31.71.04	Senen	4.22	94,540	118,879	118,895	28,174	Kwitang	6	Bungur (10460), Kenari (10430), Kramat (10450), Kwitang (10420), Paseban (10440), Senen (10410)
31.71.08	Johar Baru	2.38	116,261	133,713	133,317	56,016	Johar Baru	4	Galur (10530), Johar Baru (10560), Kampung Rawa (10550), Tanah Tinggi (10540)
31.71.05	Cempaka Putih	4.69	84,850	94,031	95,244	20,308	Cempaka Putih Timur	3	Cempaka Putih Barat (10520), Cempaka Putih Timur (10510), Rawasari (10570)
31.71.03	Kemayoran	7.25	215,331	240,631	245,806	33,904	Serdang	8	Cempaka Baru (10640), Gunung Sahari Selatan (10610), Harapan Mulya (10640), Kebon Kosong (10630), Kemayoran (10620), Serdang (10650), Sumur Batu (10640), Utan Panjang (10650)
31.71.02	Sawah Besar	6.16	100,801	122,500	120,596	19,577	Karang Anyar	5	Gunung Sahari Utara (10720), Karang Anyar (10740), Kartini (10750), Mangga Dua Selatan (10730), Pasar Baru (10710)
31.71.01	Gambir	7.59	78,422	91,673	90,046	11,864	Petojo Selatan	6	Cideng (10150), Duri Pulo (10140), Gambir (10110), Kebon Kelapa (10120), Petojo Selatan (10160), Petojo Utara (10130)
	Totals	48.13	902,973	1,056,896	1,051,077	21,838		44	

== Demographics ==
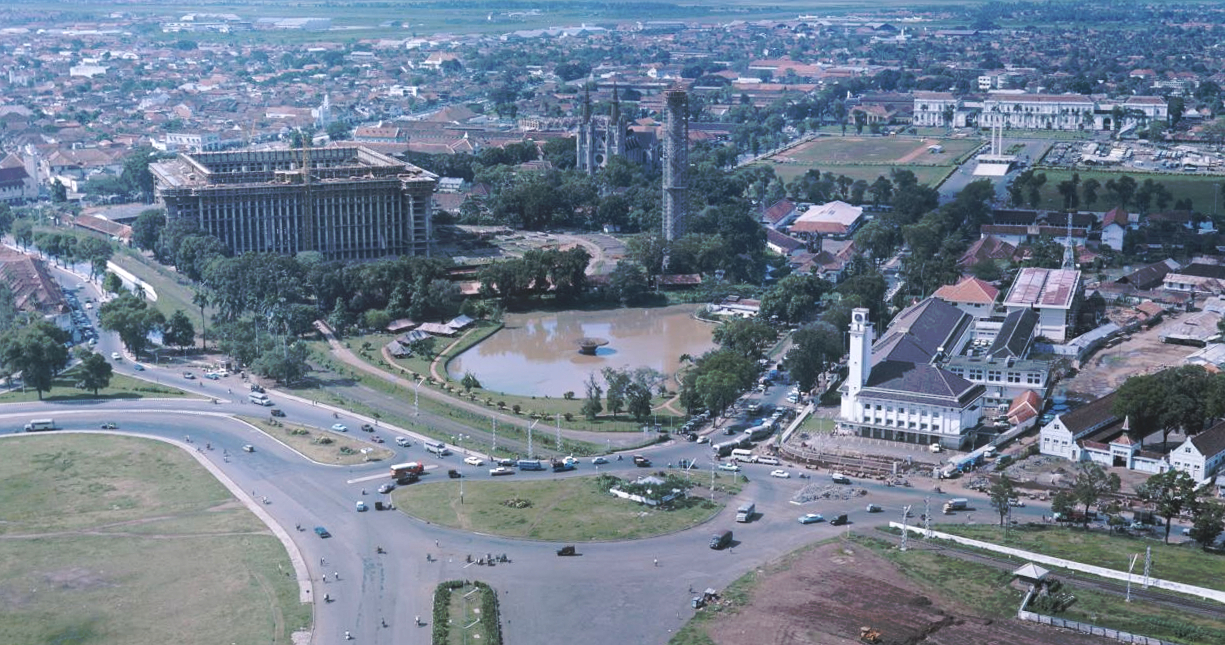
View of Central Jakarta to the northeast from the National Monument, c. 1970s. Istiqlal Mosque was being built in front of already standing Jakarta Cathedral.

Central Jakarta had an average of almost 22,000 residents per square kilometre in mid 2025, making it the most densely populated municipality in Jakarta. Within the city, Johar Baru District reaches about 56,000 residents per square kilometre.

== Economy ==
Both GRDP at the current market price and GRDP at 2000 constant price in 2007 for Municipality of Central Jakarta is higher than other municipalities in DKI Jakarta, which is Rp. 145 million and Rp. 80 million respectively.

At the end of the first quarter of 2010, the Jakarta CBD had an occupancy rate of 80%, an increase from 78% at the end of the first quarter of 2009. According to Jones Lang LaSalle, the amount of office space in the Jakarta CBD increased by 93,000 square metres (1,000,000 sq ft) between the second half of 2010 and the second half of 2009.

In September 2010, Jones Lang LaSalle estimated that the Jakarta CBD had 30,000 square metres (320,000 sq ft) of serviced office space, making up less than 1 percent of the total amount of office space in the CBD. 70% of the tenants in the serviced spaces were international companies. The number of serviced office spaces in Central Jakarta increased by 50% in the year leading to September 2010.

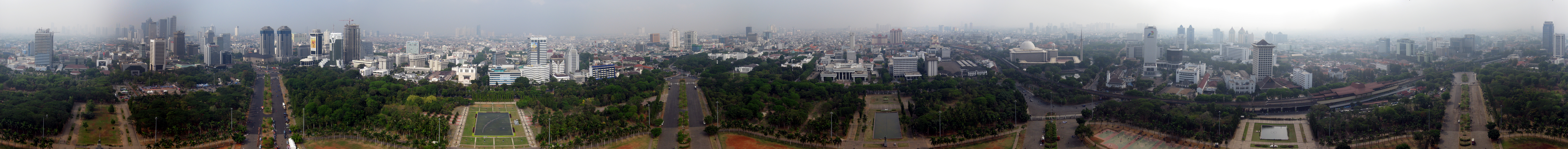
The view of Central Jakarta from the viewing tower at the National Monument

== Government and infrastructure ==
Central Jakarta consists of 8 districts and 44 subdistricts.

Government agencies with head offices in Central Jakarta include the National Search and Rescue Agency, which has its head office in Kemayoran, and the National Transportation Safety Committee (NTSC, Indonesian acronym KNKT), which has its head office in the Ministry of Transport Building.

== See also ==
- North Jakarta
- South Jakarta
- West Jakarta
- East Jakarta
- Jakarta
