= Hotel Borobudur =

Hotel in Sawah Besar, Jakarta

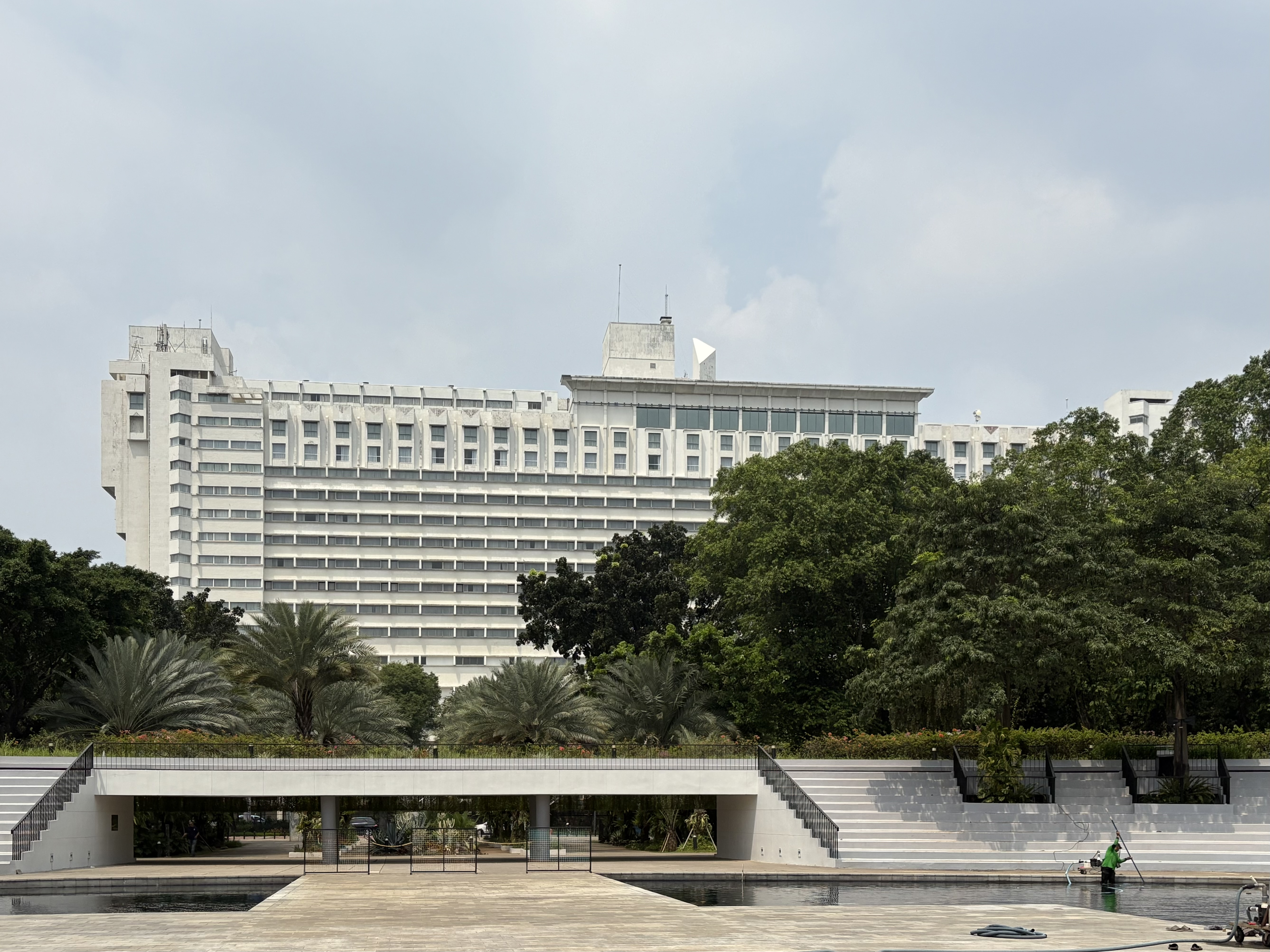
- Hotel Borobudur as seen from Lapangan Banteng
- Interactive map of the Hotel Borobudur area
- Hotel chain: Discovery Hotels and Resorts

General information
- Status: Completed
- Type: Luxury Hotel
- Architectural style: International Style
- Location: Jl. Lapangan Banteng Selatan No.1, Ps. Baru, Sawah Besar, Jakarta 10710
- Coordinates: 6.172231°S 106.835539°E
- Opening: 1974

Technical details
- Floor count: 18, including 3 executive floors
- Floor area: 70,000 square meter

Other information
- Number of rooms: 695 and 110 serviced apartments
- Number of suites: Club; Borobudur; Presidential
- Number of restaurants: 5

Website
- Hotel Borobudur Jakarta

Hotel Borobudur is a five star hotel and serviced apartment located in Central Jakarta, Indonesia. Conceived in the 1960s by President Sukarno, it was meant to be the second international-standard hotel to be built in the newly independent country (the first was Hotel Indonesia). The hotel is located near Lapangan Banteng, which during the colonial times was the center of what was the military-European colonial neighborhood of Weltevreden. At its opening in 1974, as the Hotel Borobudur Inter-Continental, it was the largest hotel in Jakarta.

== Description ==
The hotel is named after Borobudur temple, the famous 9th-century Buddhist monument located in Central Java. The five star Hotel Borobudur stands on a 7 hectares (17 acres) land, surrounded by a tropical garden of 2.3 hectares (5.7 acres). The interior design, artworks, decorations and garden statues of this hotel represents the style typical to the 9th century Sailendran art of Central Java. Which includes the replicas of Borobudur's balustrades, stupas, Buddha statues and bas-reliefs. The hotel features 868 rooms. The hotel features facilities such as a conference center, seven dining outlets, and a swimming pool. Hotel Borobudur has received several awards e.g. the Global Luxury Green Hotel Awards 2014, Leading City Hotel Awards 2014–2015, and Leading Business Hotel Awards 2014–2015.

== History ==
The hotel was constructed over a land which was formerly used for military housing by the colonial government of the Dutch East Indies. This military housing complex was located at the military heart of Batavia, the Weltevreden. Following the independence of Indonesia, Sukarno started several monumental projects, partly as a political statement of the ability of the newly independent nation to compete in the international. Some of Sukarno's early national projects which were built before Hotel Borobudur are Hotel Indonesia and the Sudirman-Thamrin Road.

In the 1960s, Sukarno conceived the idea to construct the second international-standard hotel in Indonesia. Sukarno ordered the acquisition of much of the northern part of the former military housing complex in Weltevreden to construct the new hotel. The south end of this military housing complex was not acquired by Sukarno and today the original messes still exist and are used as the military housing complex for the Indonesian Marine Corps). The new hotel was originally expected to be called Hotel Lapangan Banteng because of its close proximity with the Lapangan Banteng, located just to the south of the square. Other suggested name for the hotel was Hotel Jakarta Raya.

Groundbreaking of the hotel's construction took place in 1963 with Governor Soemarno attended the ceremony. The original design features 220 suite rooms housed in a six-floor building. The hotel was designed to accommodate guest of honors of the Istana Negara, the presidential palace of Indonesia. During the events of 30 September 1965, construction of the hotel was disrupted for several years. The hotel construction would only be completed in 1974. On March 23, 1974, President Suharto officially opened the Hotel Borobudur Inter-Continental, the "largest hotel in Jakarta". At this time the hotel design was expanded to 12 floors, housing 695 rooms, and contains apartments. The hotel was the official hotel for the Pacific Asia Travel Association.(PATA)
