= Pasar Baru =

- Subdistrict

Other transcription(s)
  - Dutch: Passer Baroe
  - Chinese: 新把殺
  - Punjabi: ਨਵਾਂ ਬਾਜ਼ਾਰ; Navāṁ bāzāra
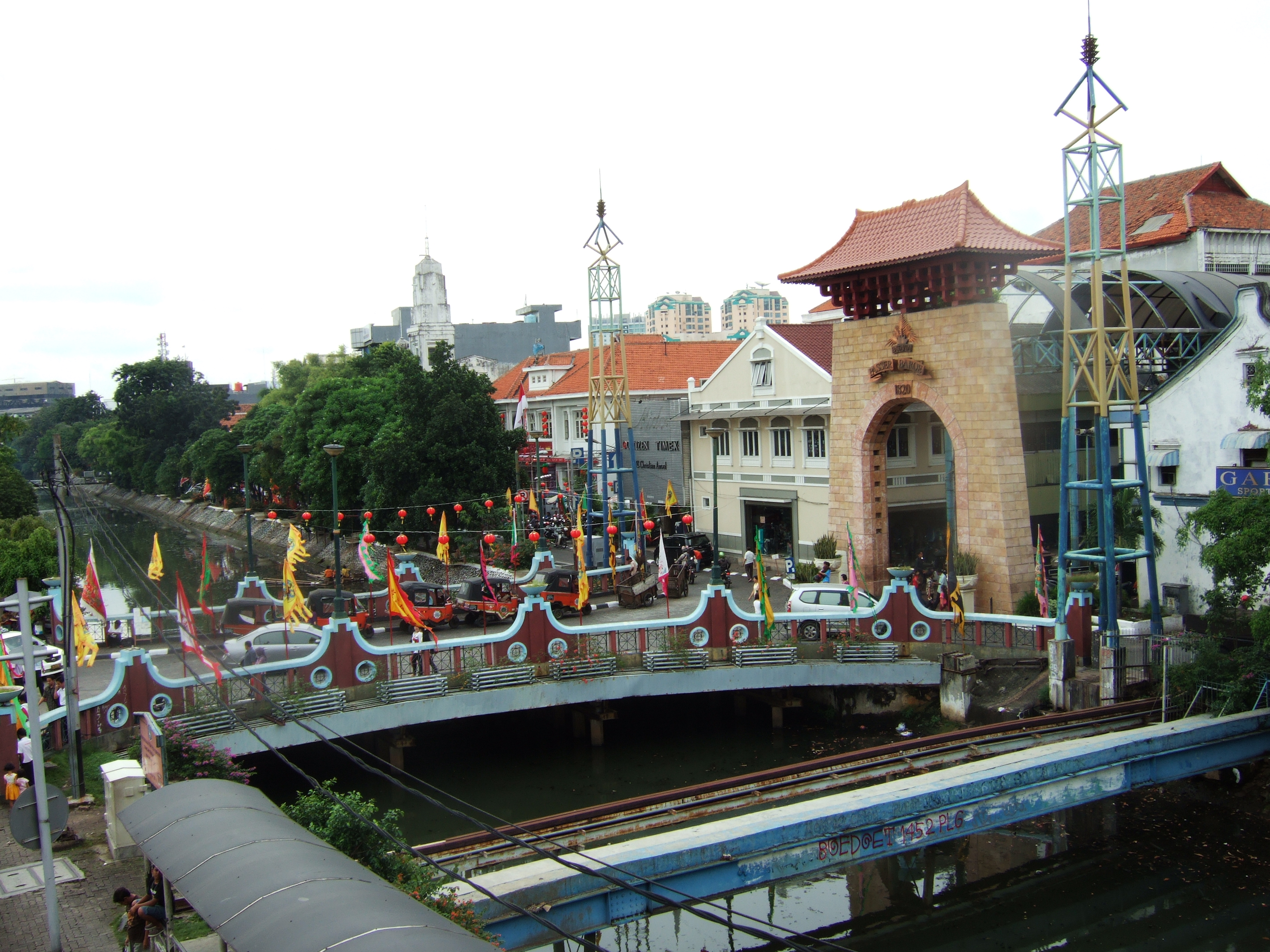
- Archway of Pasar Baru
- Interactive map of Pasar Baru
- Country: Indonesia
- Province: Jakarta
- Administrative city: Central Jakarta
- District: Sawah Besar
- Postal code: 10710

Pasar Baru is a subdistrict (kelurahan) in the Sawah Besar district (kecamatan) in Central Jakarta, Indonesia. It has the postal code of 10710.

== History ==
=== Founding of Pasar Baru ===
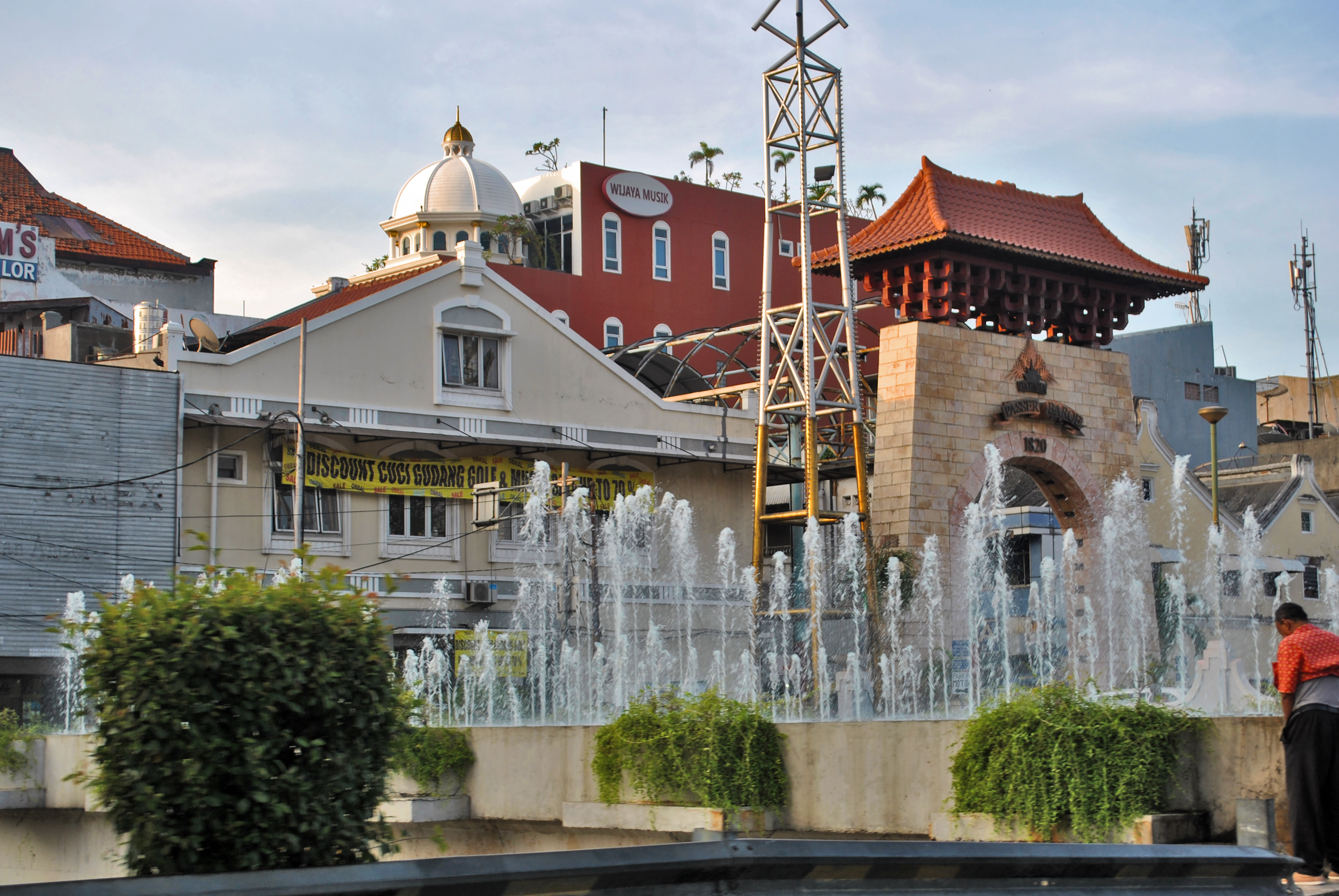
Old buildings in Pasar Baru

Pasar Baru is also the name of a 19th-century market which was established in the neighborhood and gave its name to the administrative village. Established in 1820, Pasar Baru is one of the oldest shopping district in Jakarta.

Pasar Baru is located in the heart of Jakarta's busiest district. The area centered in a street called Jalan Pasar Baru that runs in a north–south axis. The southern edge of the street is marked with a gate and a bridge that span over a canal that connects to Jalan Raya Pos, a section of Java's Great Post Road that runs through Jakarta. Right across the Pasar Baru southern gate is Jakarta Art Building. The Pasar Baru street is lined with numbers of shops, restaurants and also several shopping centers. Most of shops here sell textiles, shoes, clothes and other fashion products, such as; sportswear, watch and jewelries. While shopping center on the north sides specialized on selling cosmetics, cameras and photography products.

Culturally the area demonstrates a fusion of Indonesian, Dutch colonial, Chinese and Indian cultures. Pasar Baru is popularly known as Jakarta's Little India, due to the fact that large numbers of Indian Indonesians settled here (but mostly of Sikh and Sindhi ancestry in contrast to Medan's Kampung Madras, whereby Tamils are the majority regardless of religion), and established their textile business in this market. Pasar Baru dates back to the early 1820s. It was established as Pasar-Baroe or Passar-Baroe (Malay "new market") to distinguish it with the older markets of Pasar Senen and Pasar Tanah Abang, which were established in 1735.

Pasar Baru was located just to the north of the Euro-centric Weltevreden neighborhood. Despite its close proximity with Weltevreden, the streets of Pasar Baru was dominated with the Chinese community. Another considerable minority centered in Pasar Baru is what the Dutch called andere vreemde oosterlingen ("other foreign Orientals"): Bombay people of the British Indians, mostly from Calcutta and Mumbai. The Bombay people focused their profession on silk trading and other oriental fabrics. They generally spoke more English than Dutch.

=== Golden period ===
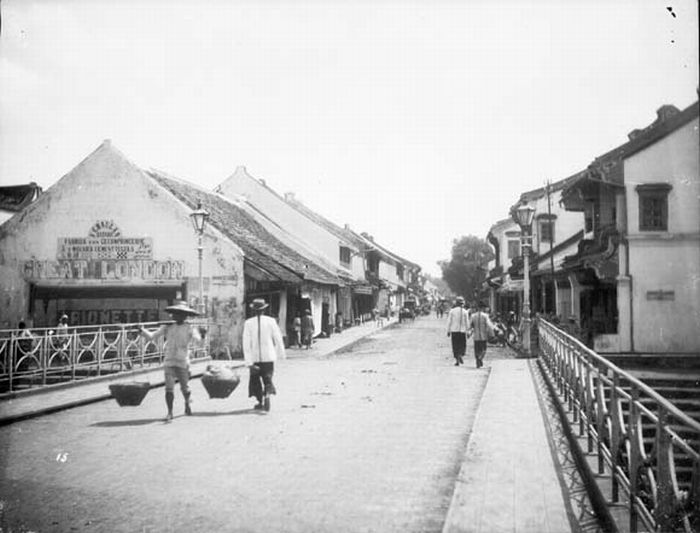
Entrance to the predominantly Chinese Pasar Baru in late 19th-century. The wider new bridge has not been constructed at the time.

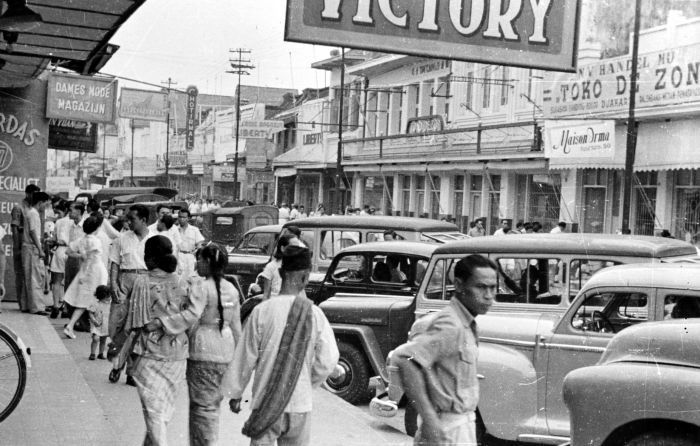
Crowds of people in Pasar Baru.

During the 1950s, Pasar Baru became Jakarta's busiest shopping center for middle- and upper-class consumer. A 1956 guidebook of Jakarta quoted Pasar baru as "the best known shopping-centre of the capital. Almost everything is to be had there: the latest fashions in clothing from Europe, America and Asia, the latest improvements on kitchen-utensils, products on Indonesian art, craft and textiles, the best fruits, home-grown as well as imported ones, tea- and lunch-rooms, jewelers, tailors, shoemakers, furniture dealers etc. etc." Because of the increasing crowd and traffic in Pasar Baru, on August 1, 1957, the government banned parking along the street of Pasar Baru to ease traffic flow. Despite the ban, in practice it was difficult to keep cars from parking in Pasar Baru.

During this golden period, the stores of Pasar Baru were predominantly Chinese, e.g. Warenhuis Sam Hoo. Indian presence was also large, and mostly focused on textile stores known locally as Toko Bombay. Examples of Toko Bombay were Kissoomall, Bagamall, Chotirmall, and Gehimall.

Several Indonesia's largest department store chain trace it roots back to Pasar Baru, e.g. Matahari department store, Indonesia's largest department store chain which started when the founder Hari Darmawan bought a 1920s building at Jalan Pasar Baru 52-58 called Toko de Zon ("sun shop") and rename it Matahari (Indonesian "sun").

=== Decline ===
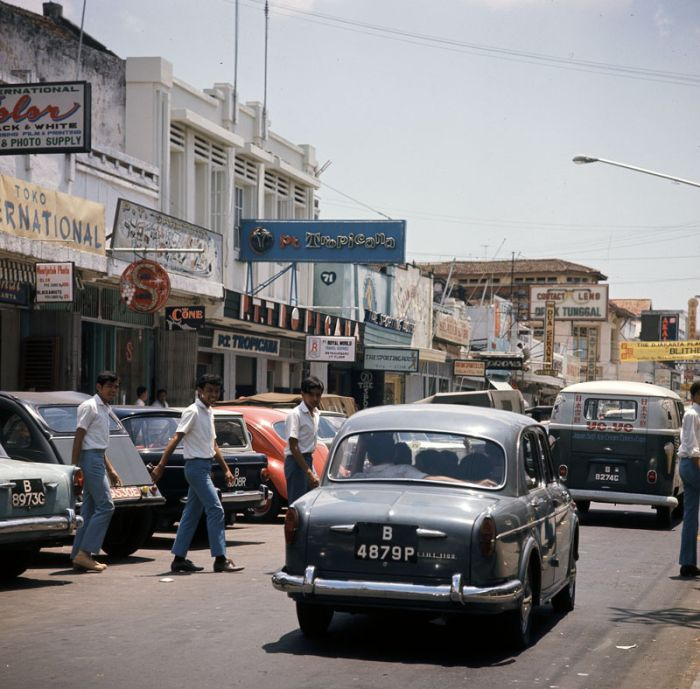
Pasar Baru in the 1970s.

Pasar Baru began to lose out to modern shopping malls of the 1970s and 1980s, such as Gajah Mada Plaza, Aldiron Plaza and Ratu Plaza; as well as large air-conditioned malls in the 1990s. Despite this, Pasar Baru continues to survive with a more mid-market target.

A roof was installed over Pasar Baru street to protect shoppers from the rain.

The Government of Jakarta is planning to revamp Pasar Baru starting in 2027. It will transform the area into a Korean-styled food district inspired by the Myeong-dong neighborhood of Seoul, South Korea.

== Attractions ==
Pasar Baru includes three different areas: Jalan Pintu Air Raya, Metro Atom Plaza and Harco Plaza Pasar Baru, allowing visitors to find a variety of products and attractions, including clothes, footwear, musical instruments, beauty products, watches, cameras and more. In addition to being a shopping hub, Pasar Baru also offers noodle shops and street food as well as religious spots. It is also well known as the notaphilic and numismatic center of Jakarta, with stores in Harco Pasar Baru selling foreign and domestic banknotes as well as collectable coins.

- As the area known as Little India, there are Indian apparel outlets and tailors, restaurants, grocery shops. Sai Study Group on Jalan Pasar Baru Selatan, which is the institution hosts lessons about Bhagavan Sri Sathya Sai Baba, one of India's most revered spiritual teachers.
- Sin Tek Bio temple, which is located on Jalan Pasar Baru Dalam, was first established in 1698. According to the temple's guidebook, Sin Tek Bio was founded by Chinese farmers who lived around Ciliwung River and Pasar Baru.

== Location ==
As an administrative village (kelurahan), Pasar Baru is the southernmost subdistrict of the Sawah Besar district. It is among the most historic neighborhood of Batavia, the southern half was the former Weltevreden whereas the northern half was the commercial center of Pasar Baru market.

The boundary of kelurahan Pasar Baru is Jalan Lautze to the north, the East Flood canal to the east, Jalan Taman Pejambon I - Abdul Rahman Saleh - Senen Raya IV to the south, and the Ciliwung - railway line to the west.

== Transport ==
Pasar Baru is served by Transjakarta Corridor 8 via Pasar Baru BRT station. The area can be reached by Juanda station of Jakarta commuter rail.

== See also ==
- Sawah Besar
- Jakarta Murugan Temple

== Cited works ==
- de Vletter, M.E.; Voskuil, R.P.G.A.; van Diessen, J.R. (May 1997). Batavia/Djakarta/Jakarta Beeld van een metamorfose. Purmerend: Asia Maior. ISBN 9074861091.
- Merrillees, Scott (2015). Jakarta: Portraits of a Capital 1950-1980. Jakarta: Equinox Publishing. ISBN 9786028397308.
