= Karang Anyar =

Coordinates: 6.1539°S 106.8292°E

- Administrative village
- Interactive map of Karang Anyar
- Country: Indonesia
- Province: DKI Jakarta
- Administrative city: Central Jakarta
- District: Sawah Besar
- Postal code: 10740

Karang Anyar is an administrative village in the Sawah Besar district of Jakarta in Indonesia. It has postal code of 10740.

== See also ==
- List of administrative villages of Jakarta
