= Lapangan Banteng =

Urban park in Jakarta, Indonesia

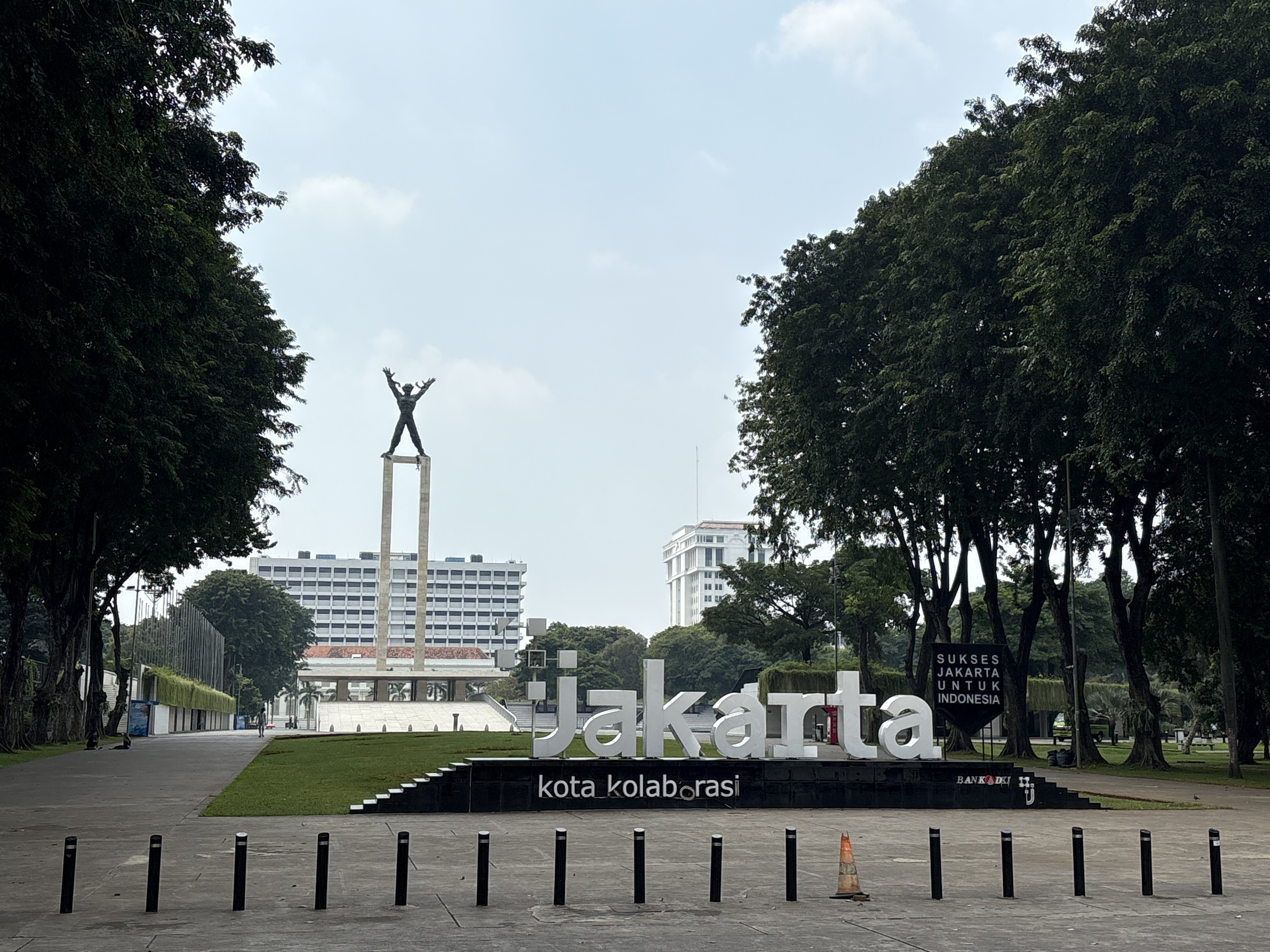
- The park with its West Irian (Papua) Liberation Monument
- Interactive map of Lapangan Banteng
- Type: Urban park
- Location: Sawah Besar, Central Jakarta, Jakarta, Indonesia
- Coordinates: 6.170271°S 106.834825°E
- Area: 5.2 hectares (13 acres)
- Created: 1963
- Owner: Republic of Indonesia
- Operator: Government of Jakarta
- Status: Open all year
- Public transit: Juanda; Istiqlal

Lapangan Banteng (Indonesian for "Bull's Field", formerly Waterloo Square (Dutch: Waterlooplein) in Batavia, Dutch East Indies) is a historic square located in a historic area formerly known as Weltevreden, today Sawah Besar subdistrict, Central Jakarta, Indonesia.

Lapangan Banteng Park is located in the area. There are also streets named Jalan Lapangan Banteng Utara (North), Selatan (South), Barat (West) and Timur (East), surrounding the square.

== Description ==
The square measures roughly 230 x 250 meters, with orientation slightly tilted east north east from the northeast corner of Merdeka Square. The West Irian Liberation Monument column built in 1963 stood in the center of the square. A causeway spanned west-east in the center divide the square into two parts; the northern parts which hosts sport facilities which includes football field and athletic tracks, and the southern half which host a park with half-circle shaped pond with illuminated fountain and open air theatre.

The square is surrounded by important buildings; former Daendels' palace, the Witte Huis (White House), today Indonesian Ministry of Finance occupy the eastern side, Jakarta Central Post Office on the northern side, Jakarta Cathedral on northwest corner, Istiqlal Mosque also on northwest corner, Indonesian Ministry of Religious Affairs on southwest corner, and Hotel Borobudur occupy the whole southern side.

During colonial period of the Dutch East Indies, the square serves as the military parade fields. It was the site of a statue to Jan Pieterszoon Coen who won control of Batavia, also the Lion column of Waterloo memorial (both are demolished).

== History ==
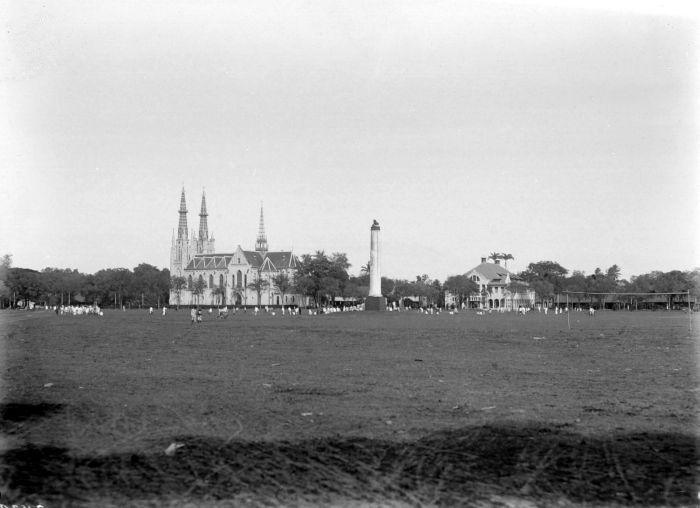
Waterlooplein with the lion-topped Waterloo Monument in 1920.

There were two main squares in Weltevreden: Buffelsveld and Paradeplaats. The squares took shape during the governorship of Daendels in early 19th century. The squares were military in character: the Paradeplaats ("Parade Ground") was the main parade and the ceremonial square. The Buffelsveld ("Buffalo Field") was renamed Champ de Mars due to French influence and was mainly used as a military exercise field.

In 1828, the Waterloo Monument was erected to commemorate the defeat of Napoleon at the battle of Waterloo. The monument was a tall white column topped with a statue of a lion. The square was subsequently renamed to Waterlooplein, a name that would only be changed following the proclamation of the Indonesian independence in 1945. Because of the lion statue on the monument, the lion is also locally known as the Leeuwinplaats ("Lioness Square"). The simple-shaped monument with its relatively small-sized statue of lion was frequently ridiculed by the locals of Batavia, some people claiming that the lion looked more like a poodle.

As part of the affluent neighborhood of Weltevreden, the Waterlooplein is a fashionable place in Batavia's Upper Town. Once a week, a military orchestra was played in public. People from the upper rank of the society paraded around the square with their horse-drawn carriages.

Governor General Herman Willem Daendels originally intended to have the government centralized in Waterloo Square and had a palace built there. However the plan wasn't carried out by his predecessor and the construction was delayed and the mansion of van Braam in Rijswijk became the residence of the governor-general. Daendels Palace was later completed in 1828 to become the department of finance building. Hotel van den Gouverneur-Generaal (Hotel of the Governor-General) became the official name of the van Braam mansion. Daendels — known as an avid Francophile — built a new governor general palace in smaller version Chateau de Versailles or more precisely the French Empire style in Batavia, known as Witte Huis (White House) is often referred to Groote Huis (Big House). It is now Indonesia's Ministry of Finance office on the east side of Lapangan Banteng (Waterlooplein). He also renamed Buffelsveld (buffalo field) to Champs de Mars (today Merdeka Square). Daendels' rule oversaw the complete adoption of Continental Law into the colonial Dutch East Indies law system, retained even until today in Indonesian legal system.

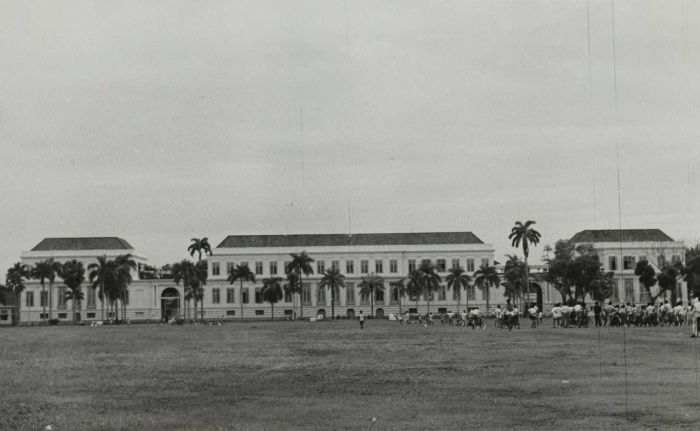
Daendels palace, Witte Huis (White House) or Groote Huis (Big House), today Indonesian Ministry of Finance.

Eventually the palace became too cramped and a new palace was planned in 1869. The new palace was completed in 1873 facing Koningsplein (King's Square). It was known as Koningsplein Palace, part of the Rijswijk, Indonesia compound.

=== Post-independence ===
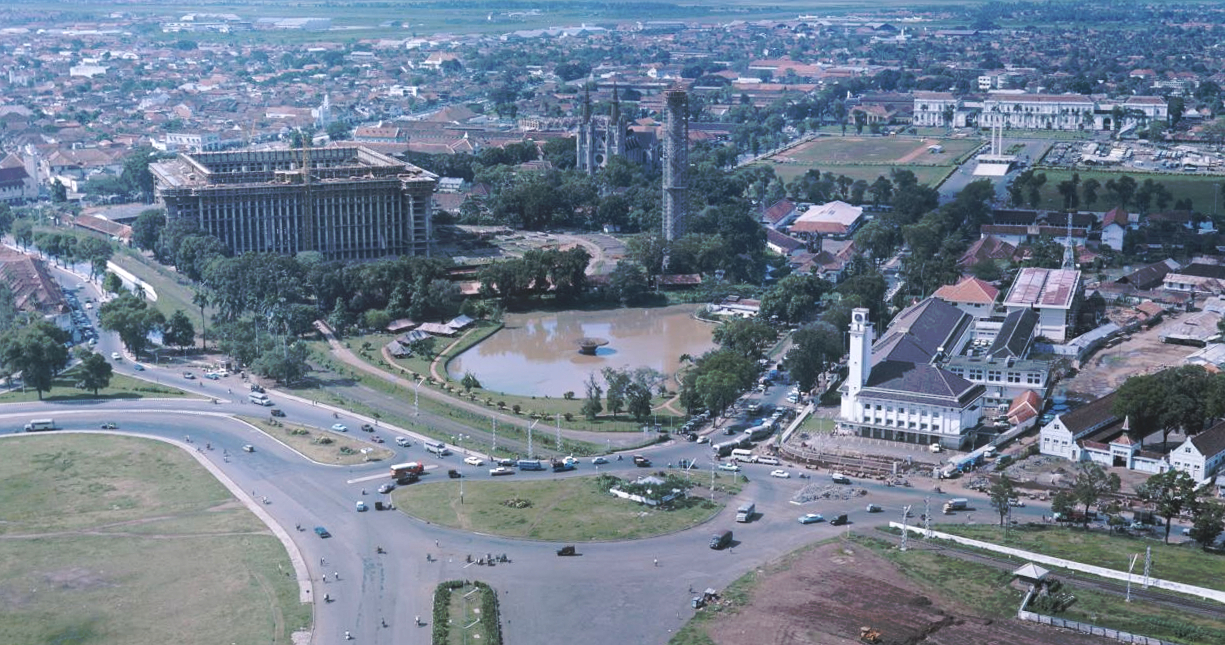
Lapangan Banteng in early 1970s (upper right corner), shows West Irian Liberation Monument and Lapangan Banteng Bus Terminal.

After the Revolution and the Independence of Indonesia 1945-1949, the Waterlooplein square was renamed by Sukarno as "Lapangan Banteng" which translates as "Buffalo's field" in Indonesian. Previously the Waterlooplein is also popularly known as Lion's field, after the Lion column of Waterloo memorial which once stood in the center of the field. Since the lion symbolized Dutch colonialism, Sukarno renamed the field as Lapangan Banteng after the bull or buffalo, native to the country's ricefields, which symbolizes the newly independent Republic, the people and the Indonesian National Revolution (1945-49). Thus actually was a return to a native translation of the old name of the square, Buffelsveld, in the Indonesian language.

By 1960s the square was also part of Sukarno's national building project. The West Irian Liberation Monument, located in the center of the square, was completed in 1963. Colonial monuments and memorials were demolished to make way for the new Republic's projects. Lion column, Coen's statues, and several memorials surrounding the fields were demolished. Sukarno also envisioned a National Mosque and a new grand National Hotel to be constructed around the square, which today corresponds to the Istiqlal Mosque and the Borobudur Hotel. Between 1970s to 1980s the square was transformed as a city's bus terminal which served Central Jakarta area. The square was transformed back as an open space that contains sport facilities, park and garden in late 1980s.

Flona Jakarta is a flora-and-fauna exhibition, held annually in August at Lapangan Banteng Park, featuring flowers, plant nurseries, and pets. The Jakarta Fair is held annually from mid-June to mid-July to celebrate the anniversary of the city and is largely centred on a trade fair. However, this month-long fair also features entertainment, including arts and music performances by local musicians.

The statue of Irian Barat Liberation monument was then featured in a 2015 Hollywood film Blackhat (film).

== 2018 Revitalization ==
Between 2017 and 2018 the square underwent a major renovation, which adds a half circular pond equipped with illuminated fountains, and an open-air theater.

== Gallery ==
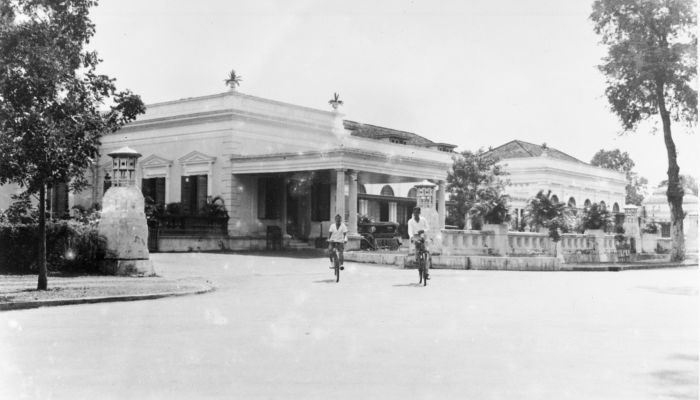
Military "Societet" on the eastside of Waterloo Square

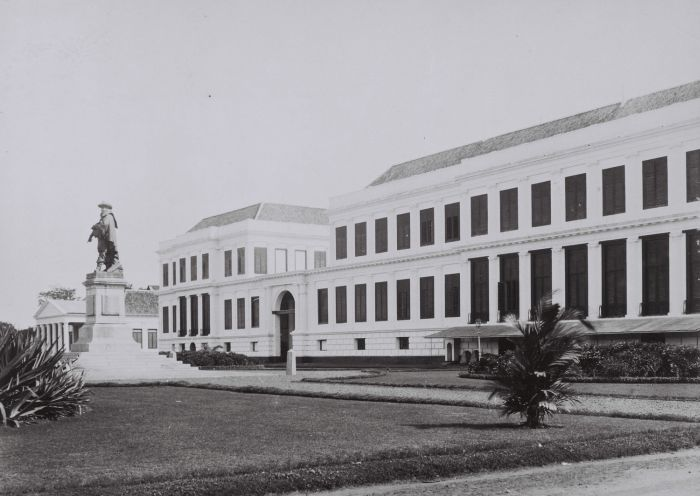
Palace Daendels, the "Big House" at Waterloo Square in Weltevreden

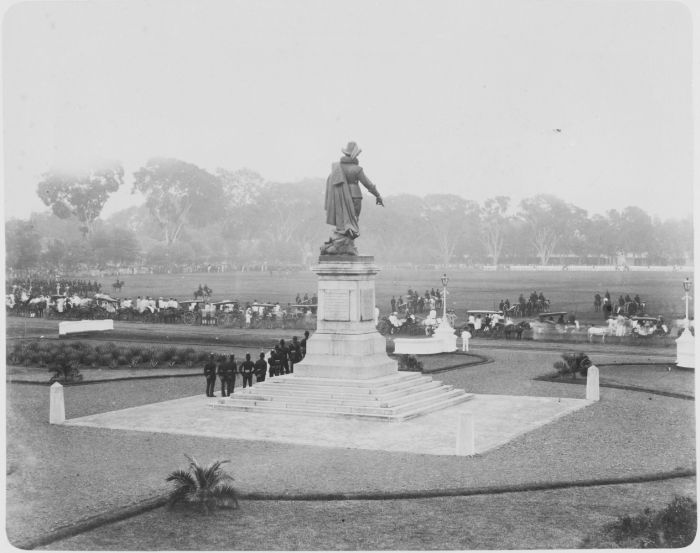
Military parade at the statue of Jan Pietersz Coen at Waterloo Square in Batavia during the coronation of Queen Wilhelmina of the Netherlands

== Works cited ==
- Merrillees, Scott (2001). Batavia in Nineteenth Century Photographs. Singapore: Editions Didier Millet. ISBN 9789813018778.
