= Indies Empire style =

Architectural style in the Dutch East Indies

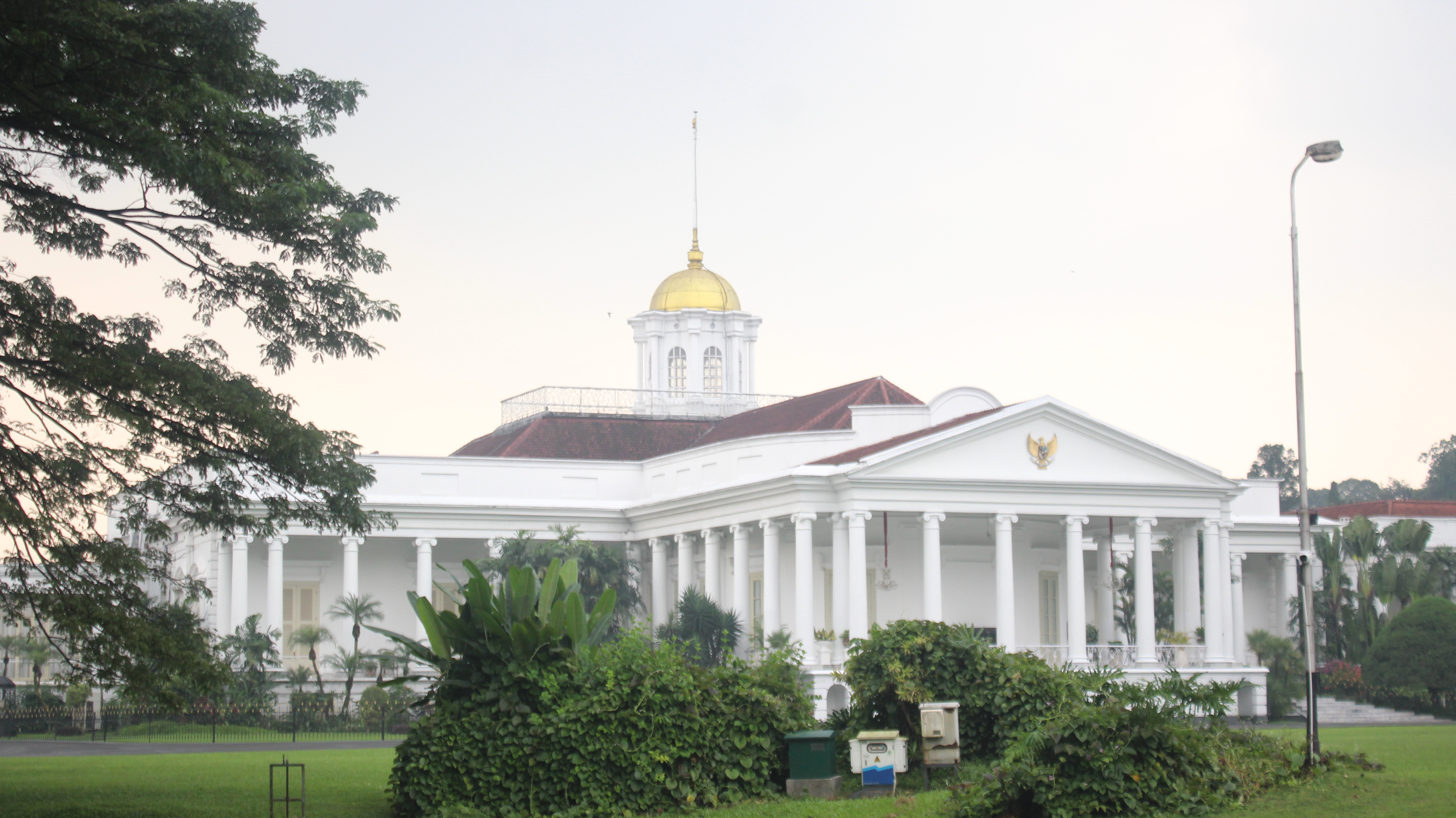
Bogor Palace, an early Indies Empire style residential building with its stone columns, symmetrical plan and side pavilions

Indies Empire style (Dutch: Indische Rijksstijl) is an architectural style that flourished in the colonial Dutch East Indies (now Indonesia) between the middle of the 18th century and the end of the 19th century. The style is an imitation of the neoclassical Empire style which was popular in mid-19th-century France. Conformed to the tropical setting of Indonesia, the style became known in the Dutch East Indies as the Indies Empire style. It is characterized by features such as a symmetrical layout, high ceilings, and spacious front and rear galleries flanked with Greek columns.

== History ==
=== Rise of the Indies Empire style ===
The development of the Indies Empire style is strongly related to the Indies culture, a society of mixed descendants which developed in the Dutch East Indies. Indies people associated themselves with high status and expressed themselves by building opulent country houses usually associated with European aristocrats. Many of these country houses appeared in the periphery of Batavia around the middle of the 17th-century, the architectural style of which reached its peak when it merged completely with the Javanese local architecture, a new style known as the Old Indies style.

With the arrival of Herman Willem Daendels in the early 19th-century, the development of the architectural style of these country houses took a different course. Daendels was a former colonel general of Louis Bonaparte in France. At that time, a neoclassical architectural movement named Empire style was popular in France. When Daendels was made the Governor-General of the Dutch East Indies, he made Empire Style popular in the Dutch East Indies. Conforming to the tropical architecture of Indonesia, the style became known as the Indies Empire Style.

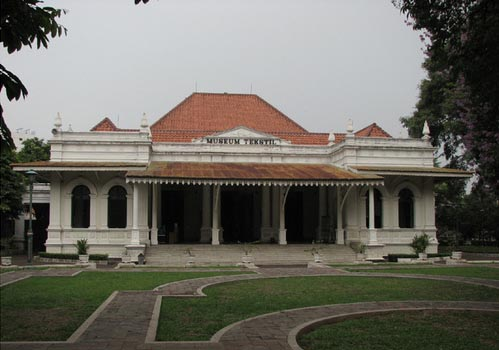
The Textile Museum in Jakarta, an example of a later period of Indies Empire style with the additions of corrugated steel shades

By the end of the 19th-century, clubhouses and playhouses were built in big cities of the Indies such as Batavia, Semarang, and Surabaya; most were built following the Indies Empire style trend. City development at the end of the 19th-century also influenced the form of the Indies Empire style. The lack of available space in city centers required modifications of typical Indies Empire-style houses. Stone columns were replaced with wooden or narrow iron columns, usually imported from the Netherlands. Also changing was the addition of corrugated steel shades supported by cast iron consoles to protect the windows and the front porch from rainwater and sun. Examples of Indies Empire style houses from this later period are the Jakarta Textile Museum and some houses in Jalan Bubutan, Surabaya.

In the 19th century, the Indies Empire style is considered a representative of the "uptown" of Batavia, the area south of the "downtown" Kota Tua. Indies Empire style is described as a trend in which houses were built in "...one storey with large gardens, with front and back galleries and high and wide halls; houses with hanging roofs where shade, air, and coolness were the dominant privileges...", compared with the earlier Dutch style houses in Kota Tua, described as houses with "...high dark rooms with the beamed ceilings, the white painted walls, and the red tiled floors."

=== Decline ===
Indies Empire style flourished until the early 20th century, when the style was met with criticism. Indies Empire style in Indonesia was not the work of a professional architect, but the design of a building supervisor (opzichter). Modern academics such as architects Berlage and Moojen considered the Indies Empire style buildings to be low in quality; which led to a renaissance of architectural style which sought a new unique identity specially attributed to the culture of Dutch Indies. Later a new style emerged, known as the New Indies style, a modern movement and a Dutch branch of Rationalism which in the end replaced the Indies Empire style.

== Characteristics ==
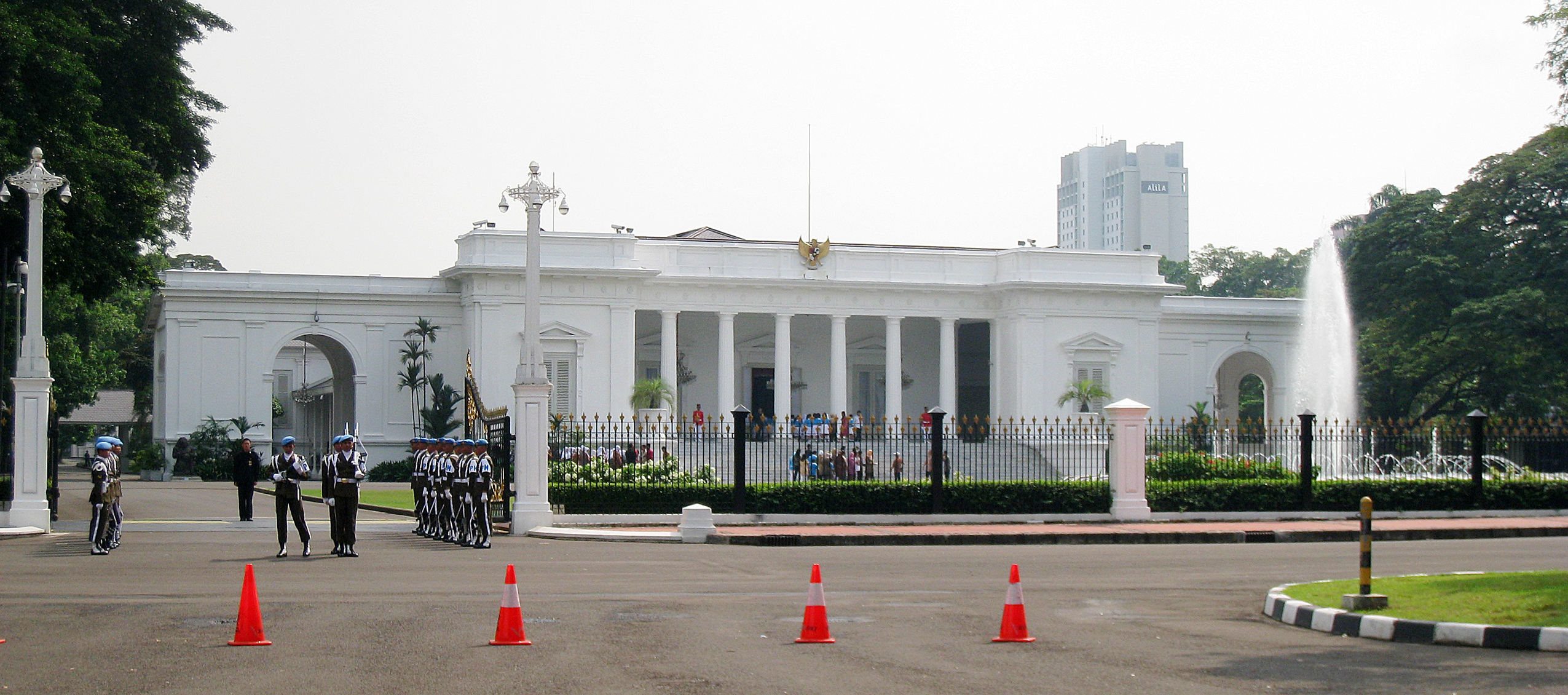
Merdeka Palace, a typical residential building in early Indies Empire style

Indies Empire style is essentially Empire style conformed to the tropical setting of the Dutch East Indies. Similar to the Empire style, the Indies Empire style made an eclectic use of antique motifs – usually Greco-Roman – to imitate an imperial colonial dynasty. Few buildings in the Indies make reference to the Gothic style e.g. the residence of Raden Saleh. The layout is symmetrical, with a high ceiling, thick walls, and marble floor. Buildings often have a front (voorgalerij) and rear gallery (achtergalerij), flanked with Greek columns. These front and rear porticos are very spacious compared with its original European-style to improve cross ventilation into the interior as well as protecting it from intense tropical heat and rain – a European attempt to imitate the local pringgitan, a Javanese veranda with a bamboo bench where people may sleep during a hot noon. Furniture may be placed in the portico. An afternoon dance party or a card game is usually held in the portico, a tradition which mimics a French tradition more than a Dutch or Javanese tradition.

An Indies Empire style building has a symmetrical layout and composition. It consists of a main building, sometimes with additional pavilions situated on both sides of the main building. The main building contains a central hall which connects both the front and rear portico as well as various rooms inside. A gallery connects the main building with a service building which contains rooms for slaves, storage, kitchen, and other service facilities. The whole compound is situated on a large piece of land with spacious gardens at the front, rear, and sides of the main building. Tropical palm trees usually decorate this landscaping.

== Examples ==
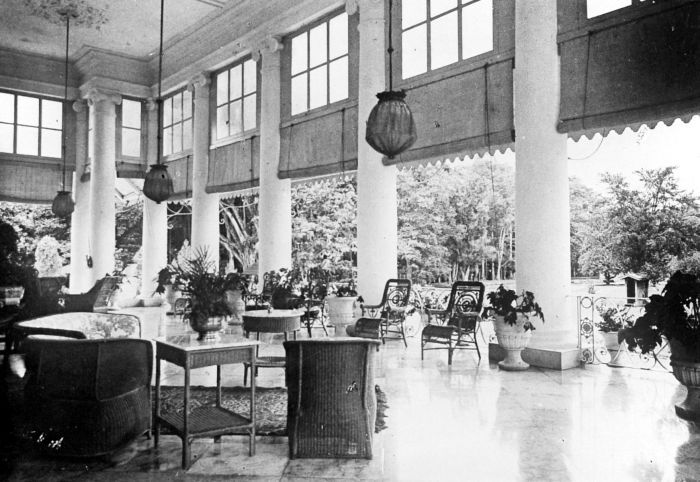
Spacious rear gallery of Bogor Palace was used to hold social events, a typical feature in Indies Empire style

Indies Empire style buildings can still be found in major colonial cities in Indonesia such as Jakarta and Surabaya. Below are notable examples of Indies Empire style buildings in Indonesia.

- Residential buildings
  - A.A. Maramis Building (Jakarta, 1809)
  - Batavia Marine Hotel (Jakarta, 1815?)
  - Bogor Palace (Bogor, 1856)
  - Istana Negara (Jakarta, 1804–1848)
  - Jakarta City Hall (Jakarta)
  - Merdeka Palace (Jakarta, 1873)
  - National Gallery of Indonesia – main building (Jakarta, 1817)
  - Pancasila Building (Jakarta, 1830)
- Civic buildings
  - Batavia Harmony Society (Jakarta, 1815)
  - Jakarta Art Building (Jakarta, 1821)
  - Jakarta Immanuel Church (Jakarta, 1839)
  - Museum of Fine Arts and Ceramics (Jakarta, 1870)
  - National Museum of Indonesia (Jakarta, 1862)

== See also ==
- Colonial architecture of Indonesia
- Colonial architecture in Jakarta, late 18th century to 1870
- Dutch colonial architecture
- New Indies style
- Bahay kubo
- Bahay na bato
- Earthquake Baroque
- Landhuis
- Malay house
- Rumah adat
- Sino-Portuguese architecture

== Works cited ==
- Handinoto (December 1994). ""INDISCHE EMPIRE STYLE" – Gaya Arsitektur "Tempo Doeloe" Yang Sekarang Sudah Mulai Punah" ["Indische Empire Style" – the endangered Tempo Doeloe architecture style] (PDF). DIMENSI – Journal of Architecture and Built Environment (in Indonesian). 20. Surabaya: Institute of Research and Community Outreach Petra Christian University.
- Het Indische bouwen: architectuur en stedebouw in Indonesie : Dutch and Indisch architecture 1800–1950. Helmond: Gemeentemuseum Helmond. 1990.
- Merrillees, Scott (2001). Batavia in Nineteenth Century Photographs. Singapore: Editions Didier Millet. ISBN 9789813018778.
- Milone, Pauline Dublin (July 1967). "Indische Culture, and its Relationship to Urban Life". Comparative Studies in Society and History. 9 (4) (published 3 June 2009): 407–426. doi:10.1017/S0010417500004618. ISSN 1475-2999. S2CID 143944726.
- Moojen, P.A.J. (1924b). "Ontwikkeling der Bouwkunst in Nederlandsch-Indië 1. Nederlandsche Bouwkunst" [Development of Architecture in the Netherlands East Indies 1. Netherlands Architecture]. Bouwen Tijdschrift voor Holland en Indië (in Dutch).
- Nas, Peter J. (March 2009). Masa lalu dalam masa kini: arsitektur di Indonesia [The Past in the Present: Architecture of Indonesia] (in Indonesian). Jakarta: PT Gramedia Pustaka Utam. ISBN 9789792243826.
