= Sawah Besar =

- District
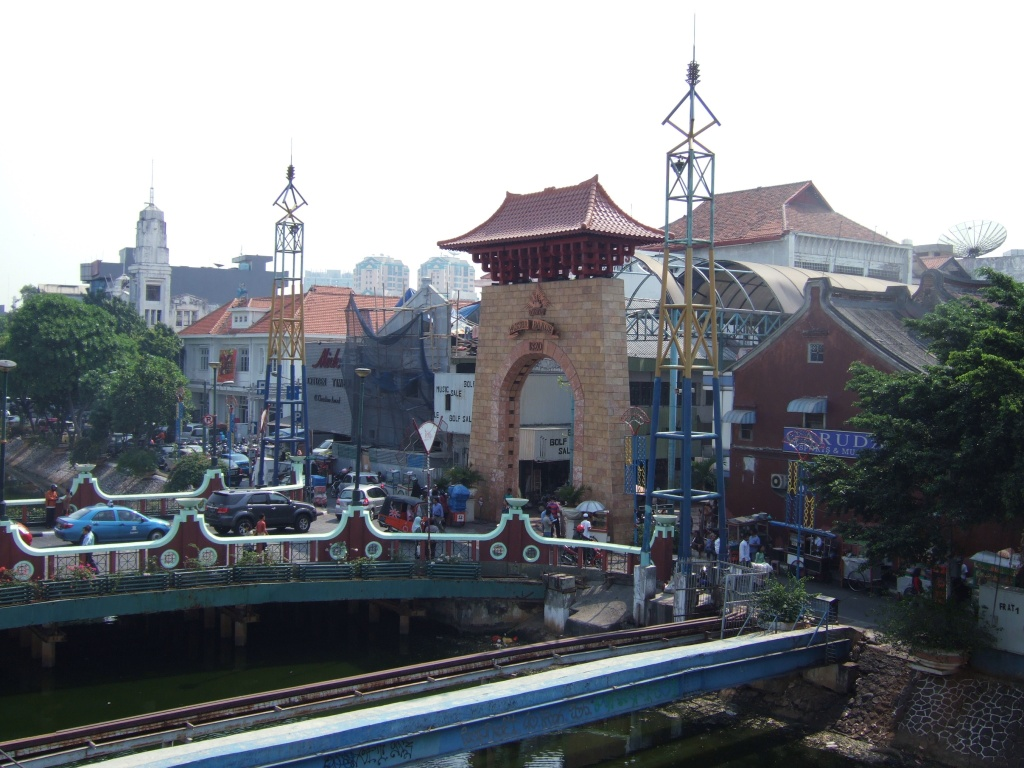
- Pasar Baru, located in the district of Sawah Besar
- Interactive map of Sawah Besar
- Coordinates: 6°09′14″S 106°49′59″E
- Country: Indonesia
- Province: Special Capital City District of Jakarta
- City: Central Jakarta
- Postal code: 107XX

Sawah Besar is a district (kecamatan) of Central Jakarta, Indonesia. Its neighborhoods are among the most historic, containing the 1820-established Pasar Baru ("New Market"), the new colonial city – Weltevreden – and the old course of the Ciliwung River. Landmarks include the Lapangan Banteng (formerly Waterloo Square), the government's 19th century, low-rise A.A. Maramis Building and its high palmed-lawned vista (being the intended palace of Daendels), and Jakarta Cathedral.

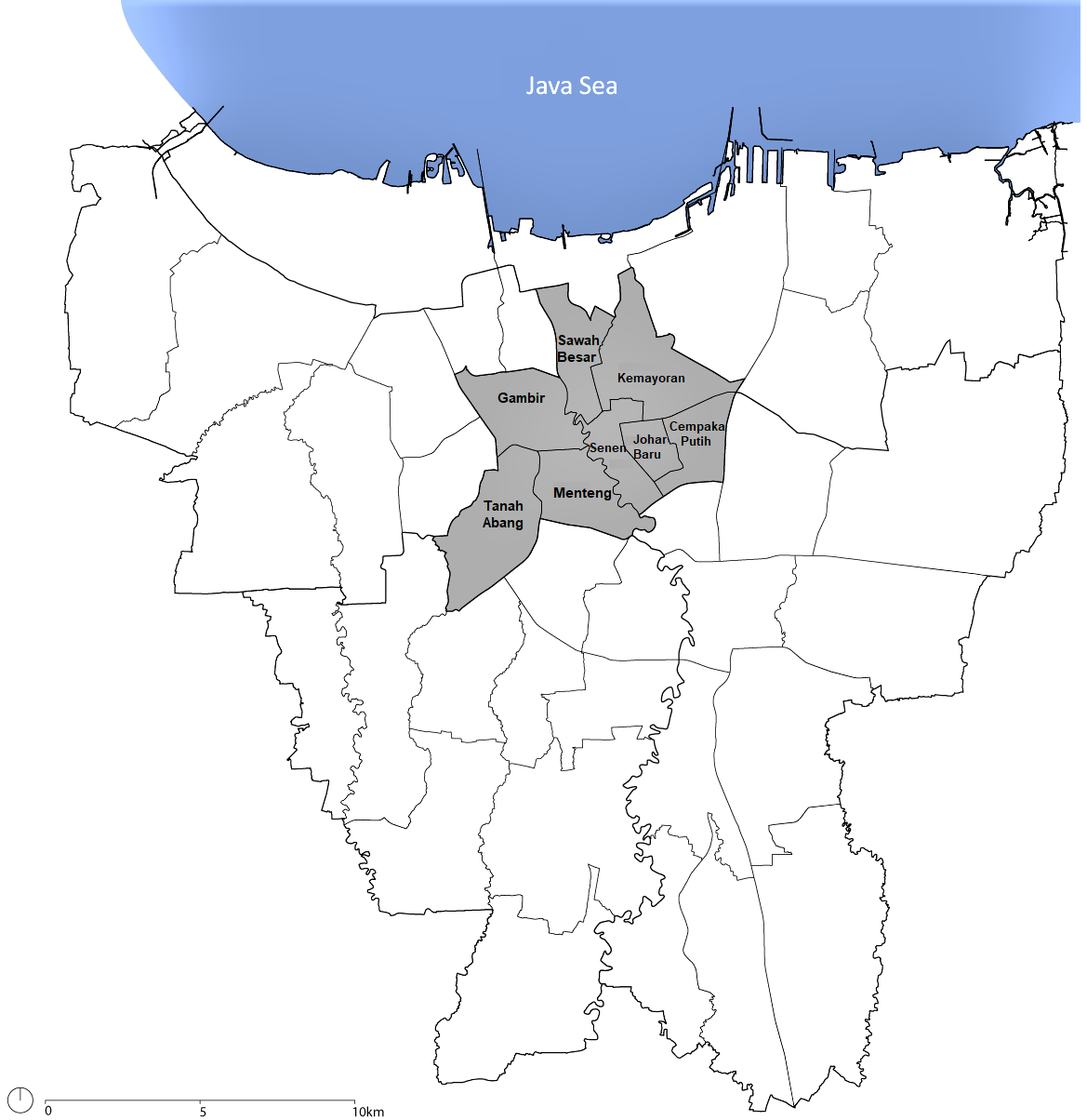
Map of the district and others. Click for broader map and to enable varied magnification.

== History ==
The section describes the history of the region of Jakarta which corresponds to what is now the modern district (kecamatan) of Sawah Besar.

=== Draining of the marshes ===
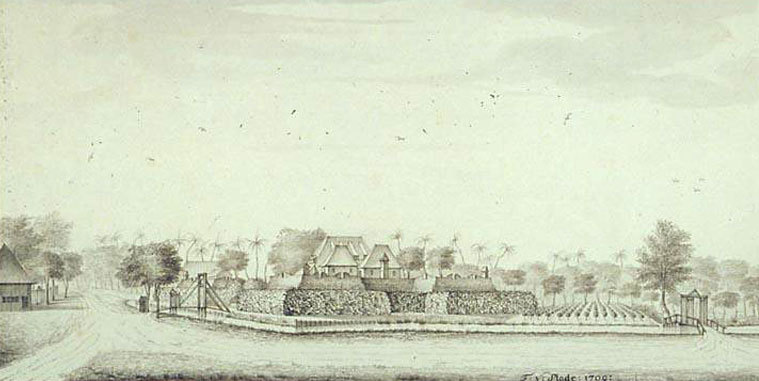
Fort Jacatra, in the shape of a simple earthen bank fortification, existed in the area at what is now the kampung of Gang Budi Rahayu.

In the 17th-century, the district of Sawah Besar corresponded to the area where the Ciliwung used to flow. The riparian zone was located southeast of Batavia, outside the city wall, then known collectively as the ommelanden (the area surrounding Batavia). To establish a military presence over the new colonial land, the Dutch East India Company built several fortresses to guard the Ciliwung, among them the sconce Jacarta, established in mid-17th-century as the second fortress upstream of Ciliwung after Batavia Castle. The fort had ceased to exist by 1825. The simple fort was located at what is now the kampung of Gang Budi Rahayu.

Ciliwung's riparian zone in the area was characterized by unproductive marshland. To convert the marshes into arable land, canals were constructed to drain the water of the marshes into the river. By the late 17th-century, the marshland had been converted into mills, sugar plantations, fruit trees plantation and paddy field.

In 1681, the flow of Ciliwung was diverted toward the east along the Postweg (now Jalan Pos) to reach another new canal, the Gunung Sahari Canal. With the diversion of the Ciliwung toward the Gunung Sahari Canal, a section of the Ciliwung between Prinsen Laan (now Jalan Mangga Besar) and Postweg (now Jalan Pos) was dried out. The old course of the Ciliwung now corresponds with Jalan Kartini XIII Dalam.

=== Chinese cemetery ===
In the early 19th-century, a Chinese cemetery (Chineesche Kerkhof) was established around the area of the old course of the Ciliwung. When it was established, the Chinese cemetery was the largest cemetery in Batavia, the total area reached 960 square metres (10,300 sq ft) in 1853. The boundary of the cemetery was the Prinsenlaan (now Jalan Mangga Besar) to the north, Kartiniweg (Jalan Kartini Raya) to the east, Chineesche Kerkweg (Jalan Raya Lautze) to the south, and Drossaersweg (Jalan Taman Sari Raya) to the west. The center of religious activity for the Chinese cemetery was an 18th-century Chinese temple located at Chineesche Kerkweg, in the southern area of the cemetery, which was originally a landhuis belonging to Frederick Coyett. Today the Chinese temple, Vihara Buddhayana or Thie Cang Wang Pho Sat (Klenteng Sentiong), still exists.

By 1825, kampung development started to encroach into the Chinese cemetery. The encroachment started from the west of Kartiniweg. Following the establishment of Pasar Baru in the late 19th-century, urbanization started to encroach the cemetery land from the south, starting with the development of houses north of Pintu Besi street (now Jalan K.H. Samanhudi). The developed kampung was then known as Kampung Karang Anjar, which later gave its name to kelurahan Karang Anyar. Eventually, by the 1930s, the remaining cemetery area was reserved for future city-building projects by the colonial government. Following the independence of Indonesia, the first streets were built from Jalan Raya Mangga Besar into the Chinese cemetery in the early 1970s. Eventually, by the end of the 1970s, the area that used to be the largest Chinese Cemetery in Jakarta was completely converted into an urbanized area.

Today, the entire kelurahan Karang Anyar and the western half of kelurahan Kartini stands on what used to be the largest cemetery in Jakarta.

=== Weltevreden ===
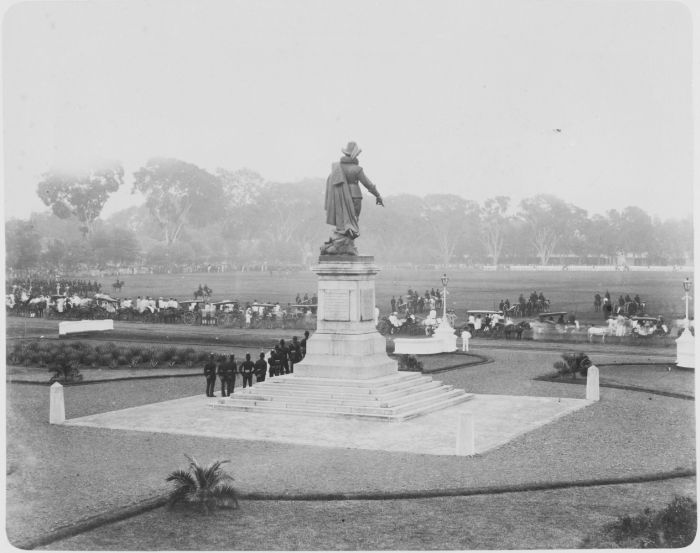
The Waterlooplein, the center of the colonial government, located in Weltevreden.

In 1787, the extensive private estate of Weltevreden (Dutch "well-contented") was established in what is now the southern half of the kelurahan Pasar Baru. Weltevreden estate was bounded by the streets Postweg (now Jalan Pos) - Schoolweg Noord (Jalan Dr. Sutomo) to the north; Jalan Gunung Sahari and Jalan Pasar Senen to the east; Jalan Prapatan to the south; and the Ciliwung to the west. In 1808, Weltevreden estate was sold to the government. The area was designated as a new colonial administrative center of Batavia, replacing the dilapidated Oud Batavia near the port of Sunda Kelapa. The open field Waterlooplein (now Lapangan Banteng) was established as the center of the new colonial center. Surrounding this open field was European-centric colonial landmarks built throughout the course of the late 18th and early 19th-centuries. Among the landmarks were the grand residence of the governor-general of Batavia de Witte Huis ("White House") of the Dutch East Indies; the Roman Catholic cathedral, and Fort Prins Frederik.

Weltevreden was also known as bovenstad (Dutch "uptown"), to distinguish it with the benedenstad (the Old Town). The distinction was formalized by the Batavia City Council in 1905; when Batavia and Weltevreden were the two districts which formed the municipality of Batavia.

Today, the area of Weltevreden corresponds to the southern half of the kelurahan Pasar Baru, south of the canal. The area today is still of considerable value given its relative proximity to Central Jakarta. Many colonial and modern landmarks of Jakarta are located in this area, e.g. Hotel Borobudur, the old and new buildings of the Ministry of Finance, Lapangan Banteng, the Roman Catholic Cathedral, Gedung Kesenian, the Pasar Senen market, the Gatot Soebroto Army Hospital and the central post office.

Following the independence of Indonesia, the area where the colonial government once centered were taken over by the Indonesian government as the administrative center of the newly independent country. Some of the political landmark in the area were Lapangan Banteng (converted from the military center Waterlooplein), Hotel Borobudur (converted from a Dutch military encampment), and Istiqlal Mosque converted from Fort Prins Frederik). Many colonial buildings in the area are preserved and can still be seen today as governmental institutions.

== Origin of the name ==
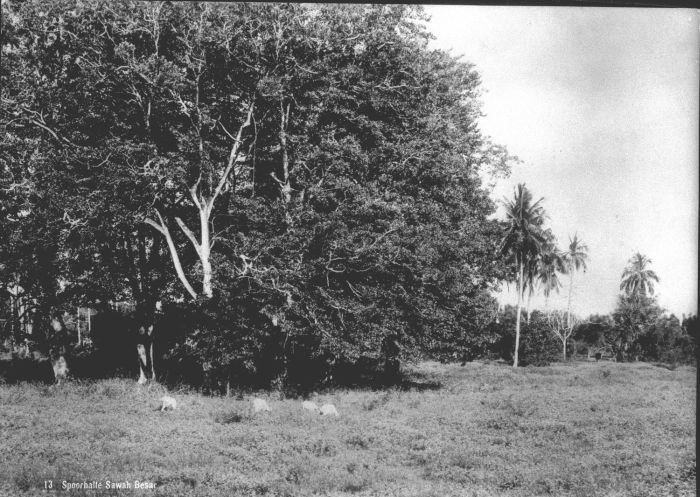
A relatively green kampung area in the vicinity of Sawah Besar stop. Once a paddy field (Indonesian sawah besar), the area gave its name to the street (now Jalan Sukarjo Wiryopranoto), the railway stop, and eventually the district of Sawah Besar.

Sawah Besar means "big paddy field". The name Sawah Besar refers to the paddy field which existed in the area before the 1860s. This paddy field, measuring around 450 square metres (4,800 sq ft), was to the east of the southern section of Molenvliet Oost (now Jalan Hayam Wuruk), south of Kebon Jeruk ("orange orchard") and west of the extensive Chinese cemetery (now Kelurahan Karang Anyar). Before the 1860s, the paddy field was the only one left in the city center of Batavia. Gradually, the paddy field was urbanized and in the late 19th-century, the entire field had been converted into a kampung known as Kampung Sawah Besar.

The name Sawah Besar, also spelled as Sawah Besaar during colonial time, was given to the street Sawah Besar, south of what used to be the paddy field. Sawah Besar Street also formed the northern section of the defensive line of the new southern colonial administrative center of Batavia, the Weltevreden. In the late 19th-century, a new railway stop was established at the east end of the street; the name Sawah Besaar was given to the railway stop, which later would become Sawah Besar railway station. The Sawah Besar street was nationalized as Jalan Sukarjo Wiryopranoto in the 1950s, but the Station still preserved its original name. Eventually, the name Sawah Besar was given to the District (kecamatan) Sawah Besar following the independence of Indonesia.

The street Sawah Besar (Jalan Sukarjo Wiryopranoto) and the original district/marsh were slightly west. Sawah Besar railway station is on today's western limit.

== Government ==
The district is divided into five kelurahan or administrative villages:

Name	Area code
Pasar Baru	10710
Gunung Sahari Utara	10720
Mangga Dua Selatan	10730
Karang Anyar	10740
Kartini	10750

== List of important places ==
Below are lists of important places in Sawah Besar district.

- Buildings and places located in the historic Weltevreden
  - Gedung Kesenian Jakarta
  - Hotel Borobudur
  - Istiqlal Mosque (formerly Fort Prins Frederik)
  - Jakarta Cathedral
  - A.A. Maramis Building (formerly Daendels Paleis or Groote Huis)
  - Tunnel of Friendship
  - St. Ursula Catholic School (former Kleine klooster)
  - Filateli Post office (formerly Weltevreden Postkantoor)
  - Lapangan Banteng (formerly Paradeplaats, later renamed Waterlooplein)
- Jakarta International Expo Exhibition Hall, also known as Jakarta Fair (Pekan Raya Jakarta)
- Pasar Baru
- Toko Tio Tek Hong
- Messiah Cathedral
- Aula Simfonia Jakarta

== Cited works ==
- Churchill, Awnsham (1746). A collection of voyages and travels. London: Messrs.
- Merrillees, Scott (2000). Batavia in Nineteenth Century Photographs. Singapore: Editions Didier Millet. ISBN 9789813018778.
- Mulyawan Karim, ed. (2009). EKSPEDISI CILIWUNG, Laporan Jurnalistik Kompas, Mata Air - Air Mata. Jakarta: PT. Kompas Media Nusantara. ISBN 978-9797094256.
- Silver, Christopher (2007). Planning the Megacity: Jakarta in the Twentieth Century. Oxfordshire: Routledge. ISBN 9781135991227.
