= A.A. Maramis Building =

- Gedung A.A. Maramis
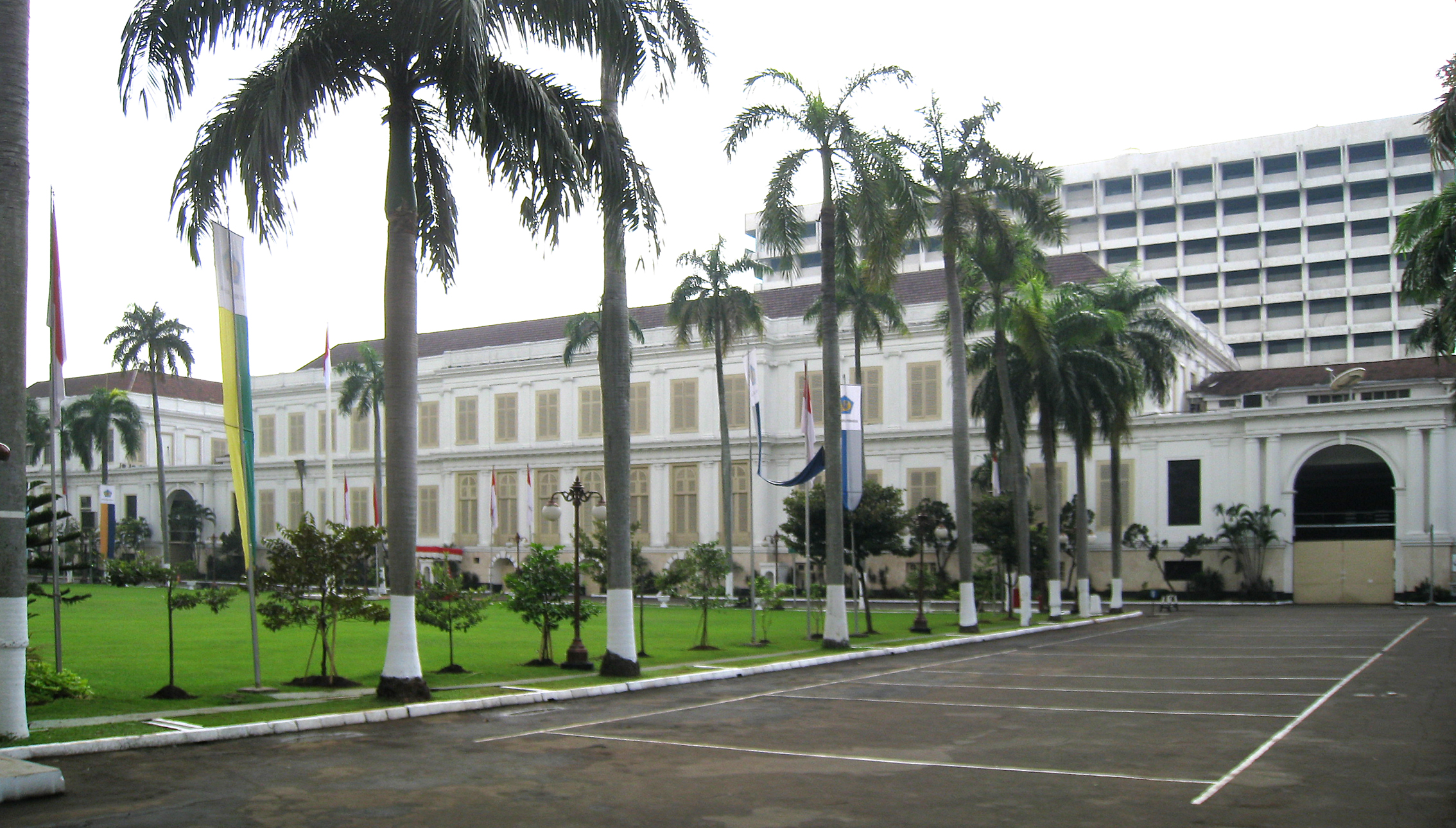
- The A.A. Maramis Building, formerly dubbed the Witte Huis or Gedong Putih, the "White House".

- Location within Jakarta Location within Indonesia
- Former names: Palace of Governor-General Daendels, Paleis Waterlooplein (Palace of Waterloo Square), Het Witte Huis or Gedong Putih ("The White House"), Het Grote Huis ("The Big House")

General information
- Type: Government building
- Architectural style: Indies Empire style
- Location: Jakarta, Indonesia
- Coordinates: 6°10′09″S 106°50′14″E
- Current tenants: Ministry of Finance
- Construction started: March 7, 1809
- Completed: 1828
- Owner: The Ministry of Finance of Indonesia

Design and construction
- Architect: Ir. J. Tromp

The A.A. Maramis Building is an early 19th-century building in Jakarta, Indonesia. It hosts the headquarters of the Indonesian Ministry of Finance.

The building was built following Dutch East Indies Governor General Herman Willem Daendels's intention to move the official residence of the governor-general of the Dutch East Indies from the decaying Old Town to the southern suburb of Weltevreden. It was never used as an official residence of the governor-general.

It is the second oldest surviving building in Central Jakarta (after Istana Negara) in terms of when the construction was started, and the largest private residence ever built in Jakarta.

== History ==
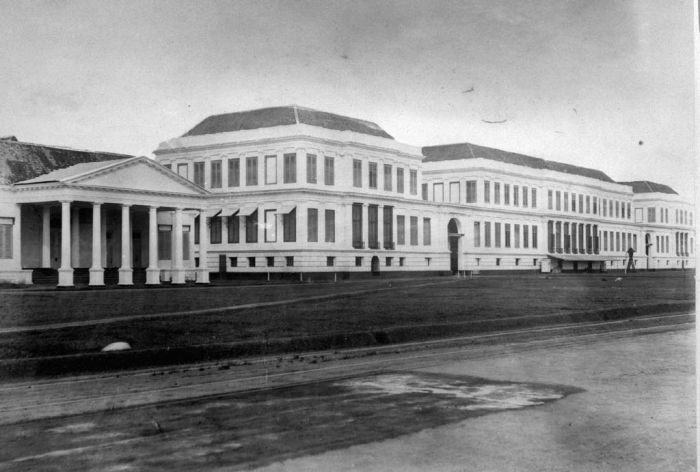
The Grote Huis, with the High Court at the foreground.

Weltevreden was a southern suburb of old Batavia. The land had been purchased by the last governor-general of the Dutch East India Company, Pieter Gerardus van Overstraten, from his predecessor, Governor-General Petrus Albertus van der Parra. The area began to develop with the gradual decay of the increasingly unhealthy old city. The initial migration began after the old city's malaria epidemic in 1732.

Development of the area as the new seat of government started with Governor-General Herman Willem Daendels. He ordered the destruction of Batavia Castle and the city wall of the old town to provide bricks for a new palace. The chosen site for the new building was the Waterlooplein in Weltevreden. Construction of the palace began on March 7, 1809. The plan shows a grand residence intended as the private palace for the governor-general flanked with smaller buildings for administrative work. Despite Daendels' intention to reside in the new palace, he never had the chance to stay because he was ordered by Napoleon to command the Grande Armée and was soon stationed in Modlin Fortress, Poland. Daendels' successor, Governor-General Janssens, installed thatched roof on the unfinished parts of the building. When construction stopped in 1811 following the British invasion of Java, the work was only half finished. With the governor's palace unfinished, the Governor-General of Batavia would reside at the mansion of van Braam in Rijswijk (now Jalan Veteran)

Fifteen years later in 1826, Governor-General du Bus de Gisignies ordered the completion of the building to be used to house government bureaus that were then badly accommodated in other parts of Batavia. The construction was started under the supervision of Ir. J. Tromp. It was finally completed in 1828, about 19 years after it had begun. The completion is commemorated in a plaque written: "MDCCIX - Condidit Daendels, MDCCCXXVIII - Erexit DUBUS" currently kept in Jakarta Cathedral. The finished building was popularly referred as Daendels' Palace (Paleis van Daendels), also nicknamed the "White House" (Dutch Witte Huis) and the "Big House" (Grote Huis).

Despite the completion of the building, the "governor's palace" was never used as a palace. The building became too cramped for its original intention as a palace and so in 1869 a new palace for the governor was planned. The new palace, known as the Paleis te Koningsplein, was completed in 1873 facing Koningsplein (King's Square). Over the years it has housed numerous government bureaus and departments including the post office, the state printing office, the general clerk's department, and the high court at the ground floor of the main building (1835). On May 1, 1848, the High Court (Hoogeregtshof, Hoogerechter, Algemene Secretarie) was relocated to a building north of the Daendels Palace.

Since the early 1950s, the building has been used as the headquarters of the Indonesian Ministry of Finance. The building was named A.A. Maramis building in honor of Alexander Andries Maramis, Indonesia's second Minister of Finance (from 1945–1946).

== Design ==
The palace was designed by J.C. Schultze in a style popular in France at that time, the Empire Style; the subsequent style conformed into the tropical climate of Indonesia became known as the Indies Empire style. The palace consists of a 160 m (520 ft) long two-storeyed main building intended for the residence of Governor-General Daendels himself. The private residence is flanked with two wings to its left and right that were intended for administration, guest houses, a stable for 120 horses, and carriage-houses.

The palace was constructed using the bricks from the 17th-century Kasteel Batavia and parts of the city wall which was dismantled in 1809.

Since the colonial period, the building has been described as "huge and ugly" by critics. There was a small garden behind the palace known as Tuin Du Bus (Du Bus Garden), but plants did not flourish there, nor did people take strolls there.

== See also ==
- Indies Empire style
- List of colonial buildings and structures in Jakarta

== Cited works ==
- Heuken, Adolf (2000). Historical sites of Jakarta. Jakarta: Cipta Loka Caraka.
- Merrillees, Scott (2000). Batavia in Nineteenth Century Photographs. Singapore: Editions Didier Millet. ISBN 9789813018778.
- Merrillees, Scott (2015). Jakarta: Portraits of a Capital 1950-1980. Jakarta: Equinox Publishing. ISBN 9786028397308.
- Merrillees, Scott (February 1, 2012). Greetings from Jakarta: Postcards of a Capital 1900-1950. Jakarta: Equinox Publishing. ISBN 9789793780887.
- Silver, Christopher (2007). Planning the Megacity: Jakarta in the Twentieth Century. Oxfordshire: Routledge. ISBN 9781135991227.
