= Batavia Castle =

VOC fort in Jakarta

Coordinates: 6°7′39″S 106°48′41″E

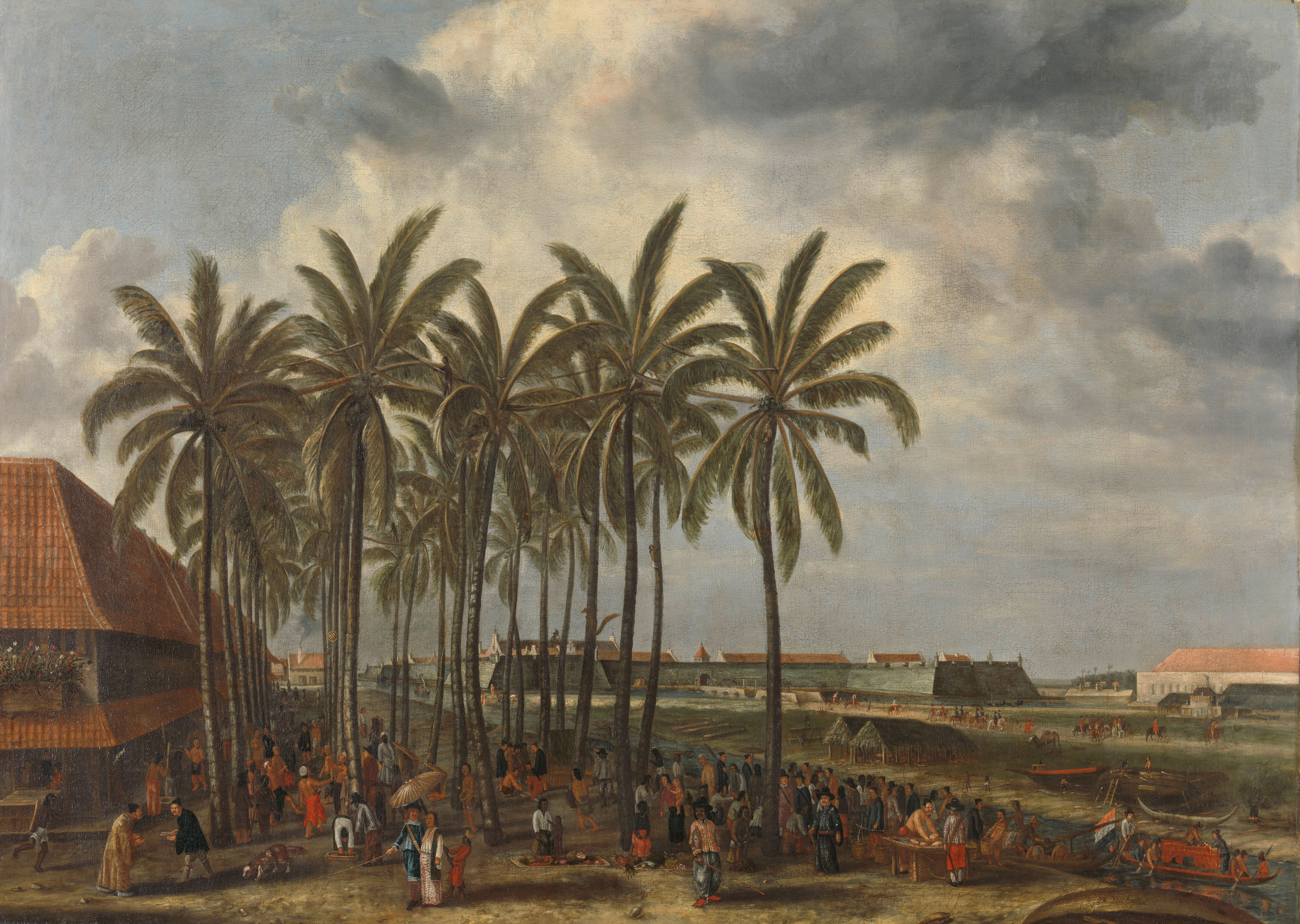
Castle Batavia, the administrative center of the Dutch East India Company's trade empire in Asia.

Batavia Castle (Dutch: Kasteel Batavia, Indonesian: Kastil Batavia) was a fort located at the mouth of Ciliwung River in Jakarta. Batavia Castle was the administrative center of Dutch East India Company (VOC) in Asia.

Batavia Castle was also the residence of the Governor General, the highest VOC official in the Dutch East Indies who chaired the Council of the Indies, the executive committee that made decisions in the Dutch East Indies. Batavia Castle was demolished in 1809 by Governor General Herman Willem Daendels.

== History ==
Originally, Batavia Castle was a small fortress which was developed into a castle since 1620, when the VOC succeeded in occupying Jayakarta. In 1629, the small fort was enlarged and strengthened to serve as a defense for the city of Batavia from the siege of the troops of the Mataram Sultanate.

Pieter Both, the first elected Governor-General of the Dutch East Indies appointed Captain Jacques l'Hermite to purchase 2,500 square vadem (10,000 square yards) of land in Jayakarta in order to setting up a VOC loji (trading post). The request was granted by Prince Jayawikarta, ruler of Jayakarta, with a large amount of money (1200 riyals). This land is located on the east bank of the Ciliwung River, near the Chinatown area. In 1612, the Dutch built a lodge (building), huis (house), and factorij (factory) on this land; collectively known as the Nassau Huis. This agreement was maintained during the reigns of Governor General Gerard Reynst and then Laurens Reael.

Batavia Castle was surrounded by a moat that surrounds all parts of the fort. Batavia Castle was demolished in 1809 by Herman Willem Daendels since building materials were needed for the construction of a new urban area in Weltevreden (now covering the area of Gambir District, Central Jakarta). The remaining stones of the castle were used for the construction of the Daendels' Palace in Weltevreden.

After the Batavia Castle was dismantled in 1809, a passage connecting the central area of Batavia (now the Kota Tua area) with Sunda Kelapa Harbor was built. The street was named "Kasteelweg" which means "Castle Street". The name Kasteelweg was changed into "Jalan Tongkol" (Cob Street) in 1950.

Before 1874, all 4 bastions of Batavia Castle were remained intact until they completely vanished from 1874 onwards.

The remains of Batavia Castle were excavated in 1940. At that time, the part that was found was the landpoort (the door that facing the mainland (southern part of the castle)).

== Today ==
The former area of Batavia Castle is now vacant, and owned by the Provincial Government of DKI Jakarta. The southern moat of Batavia Castle is now a residential area, shops, and various types of businesses such as tarpaulins.

A flats construction is currently taking place on the area where Batavia Castle once stood. Simultaneously with the construction, archaeological excavation was also conducted in order to searching evidence of the existence of Batavia Castle. The archaeological excavation must be conducted as input for the layout of the second phase of the construction of the flat. The archaeological excavation was carried out owing to the cooperation of the DKI Jakarta Provincial Government Cultural Heritage Conservation Center and the Association of Indonesian Archaeologists of Greater Jakarta (IAAI).

The excavation succeeded in discovering the floor of the Batavia Castle shaft which was made of bricks. The floor of the castle shaft was found at 2 meters depth from the current ground level.

== Gallery ==
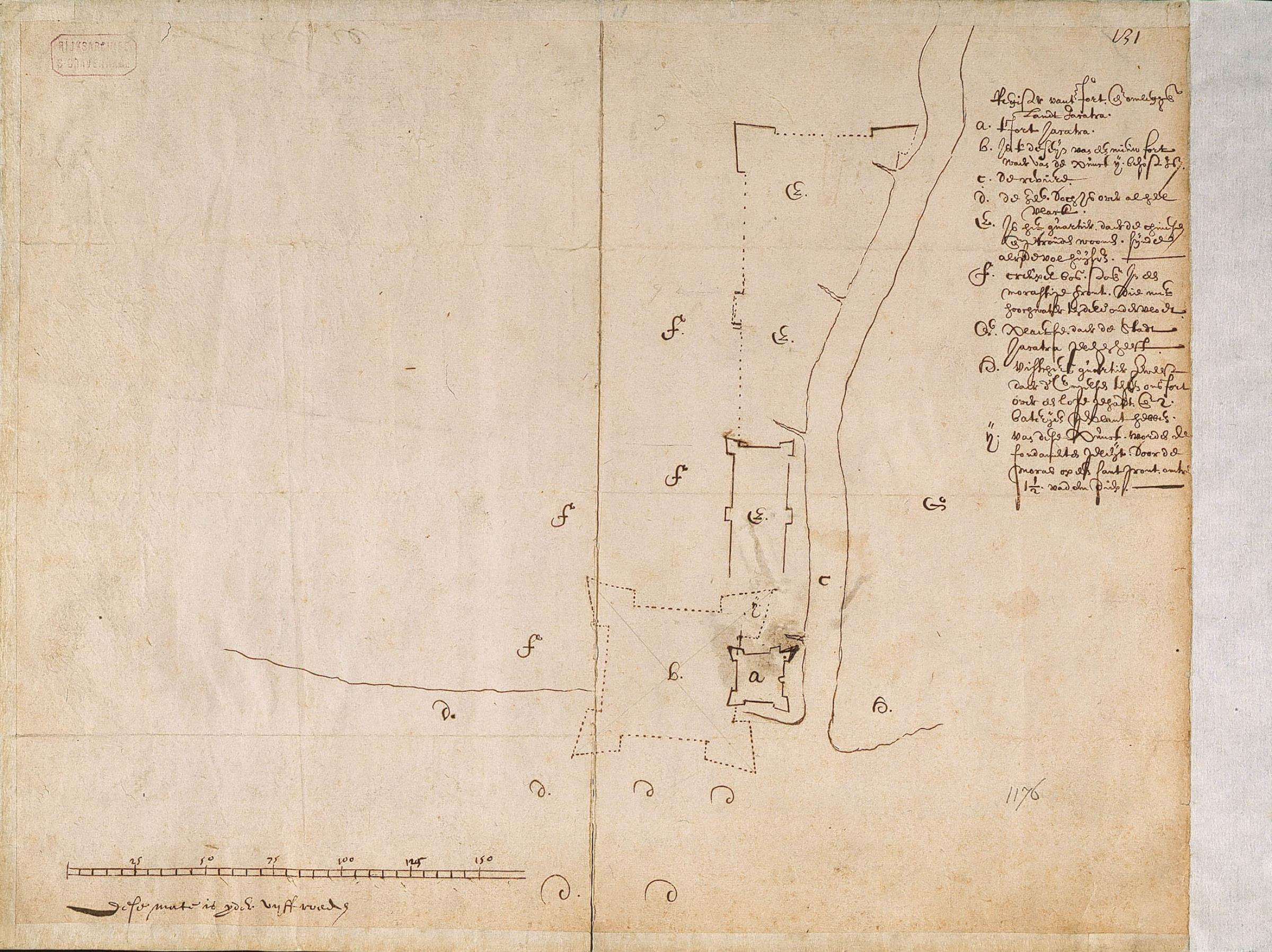
This 1619 map shows Fort Jacatra (a) and the new plan for Batavia Castle (b).

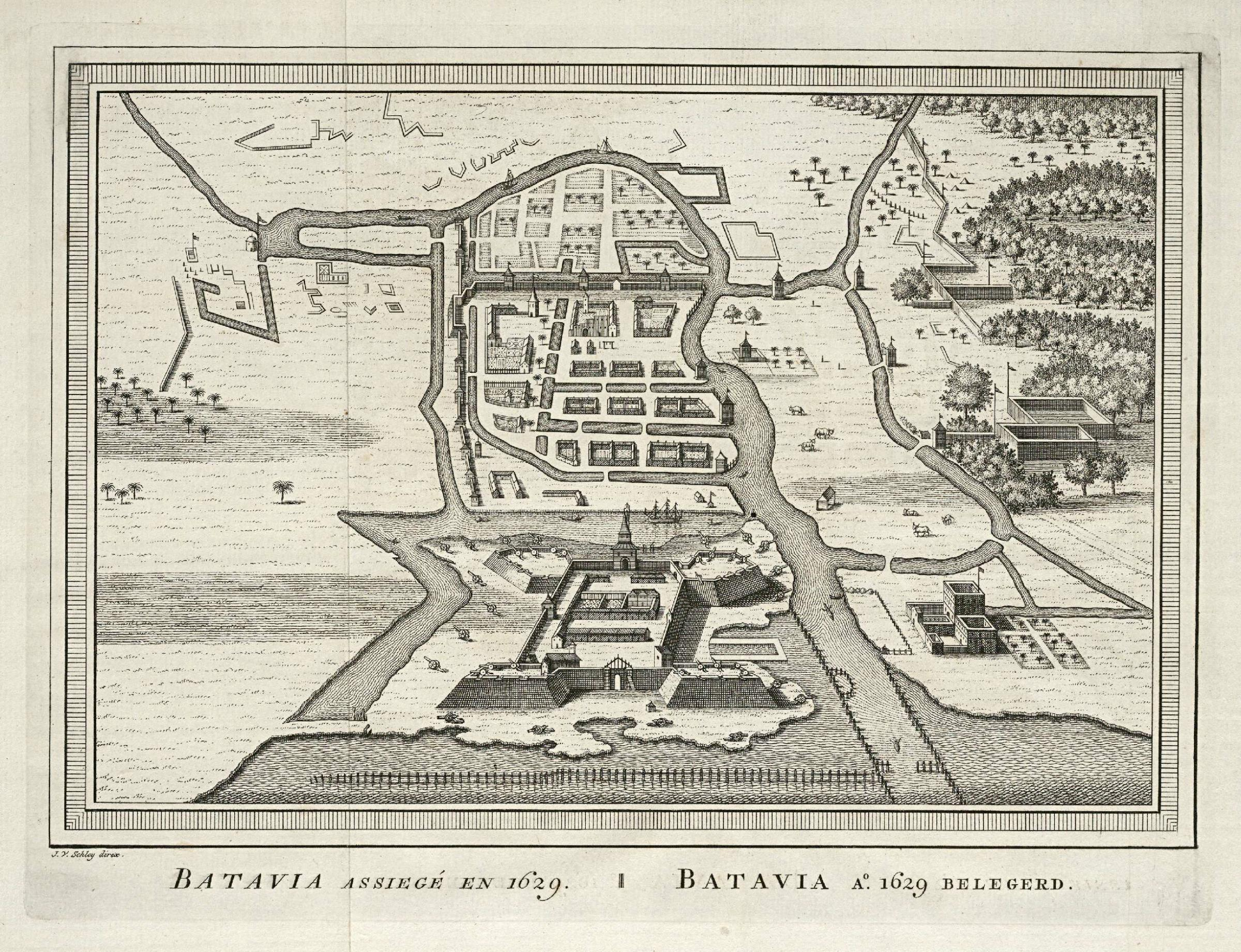
Batavia in 1629 showing an opening in the sea-side wall of the Castle; ornate portal has not been installed in the sea-side wall.

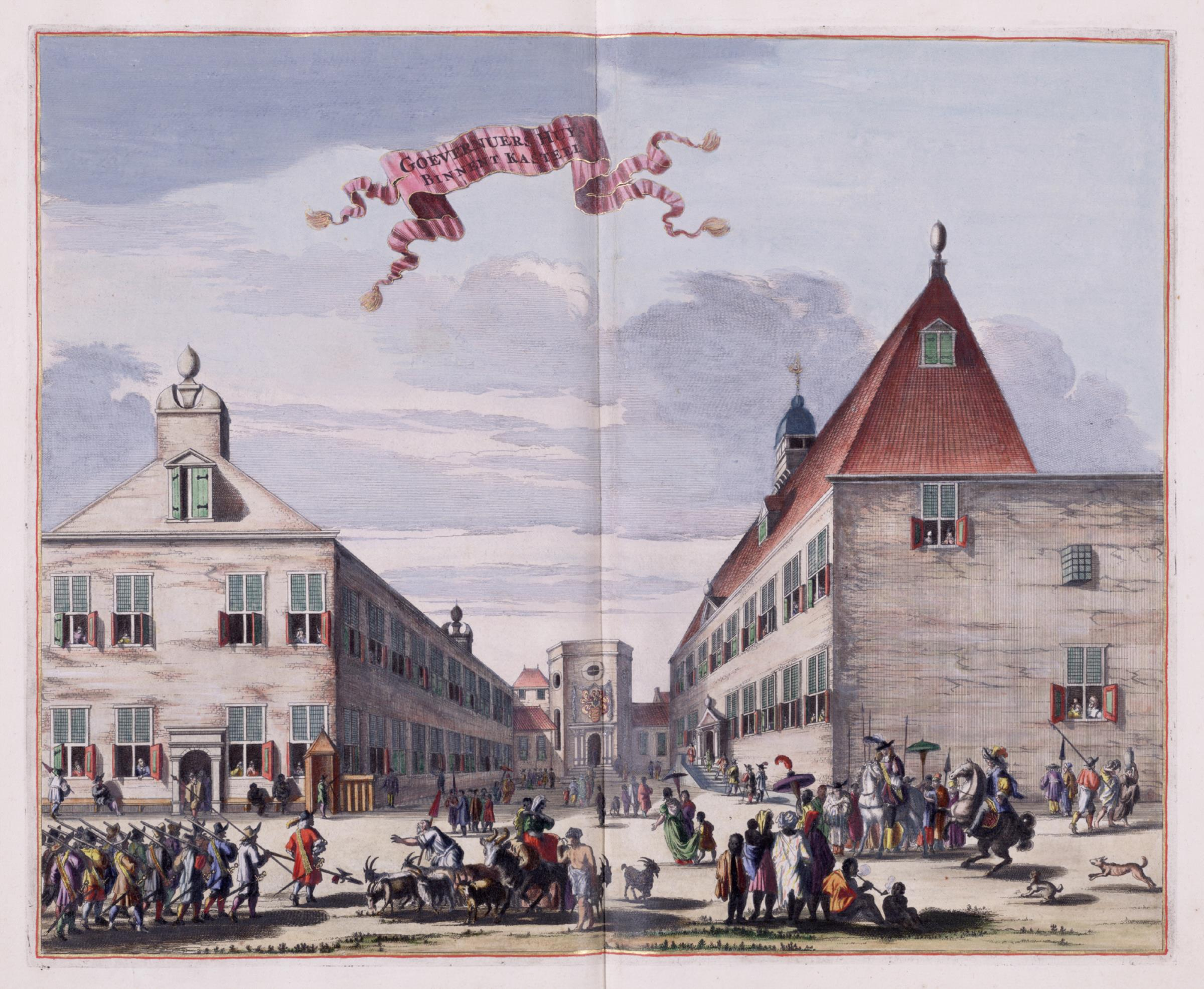
From right to left: the residence of the Governor-General inside the Castle, octagonal Church at the background, and the residence of the General-Director/Councillor of VOC. Painting from 1682.

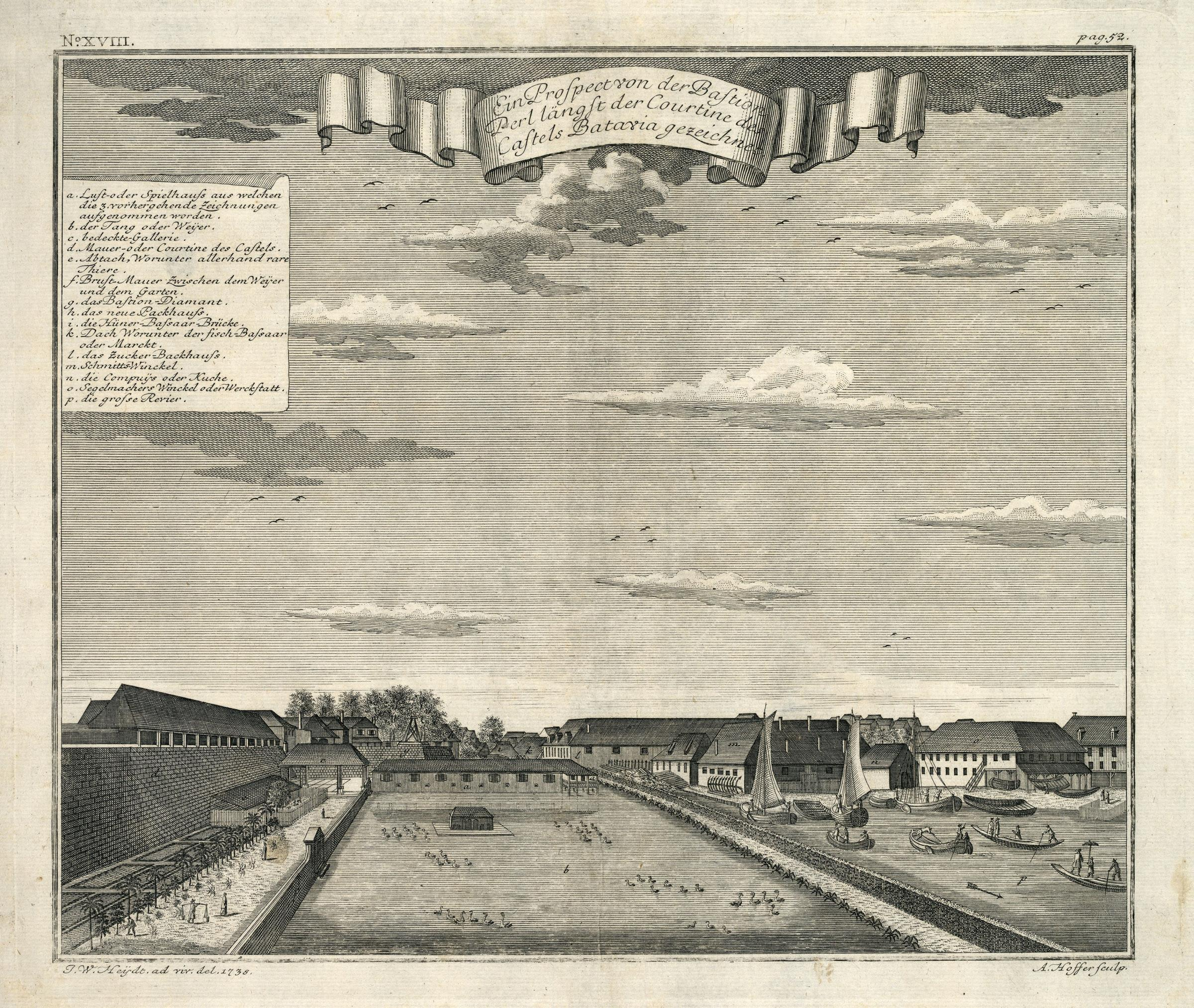
The duck pond of the Governor-General installed to the west of Batavia Castle in 1738.

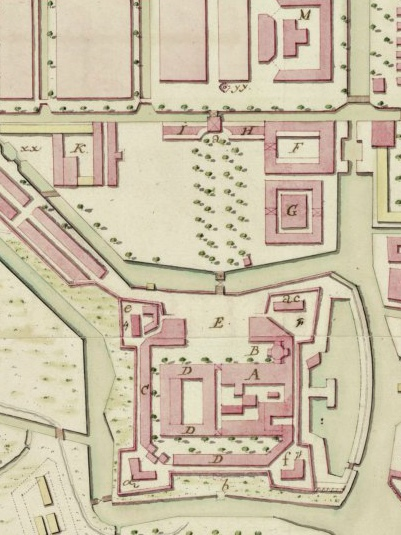
Batavia Castle in 1762 when the land-side wall had been opened toward the Kasteelplein.

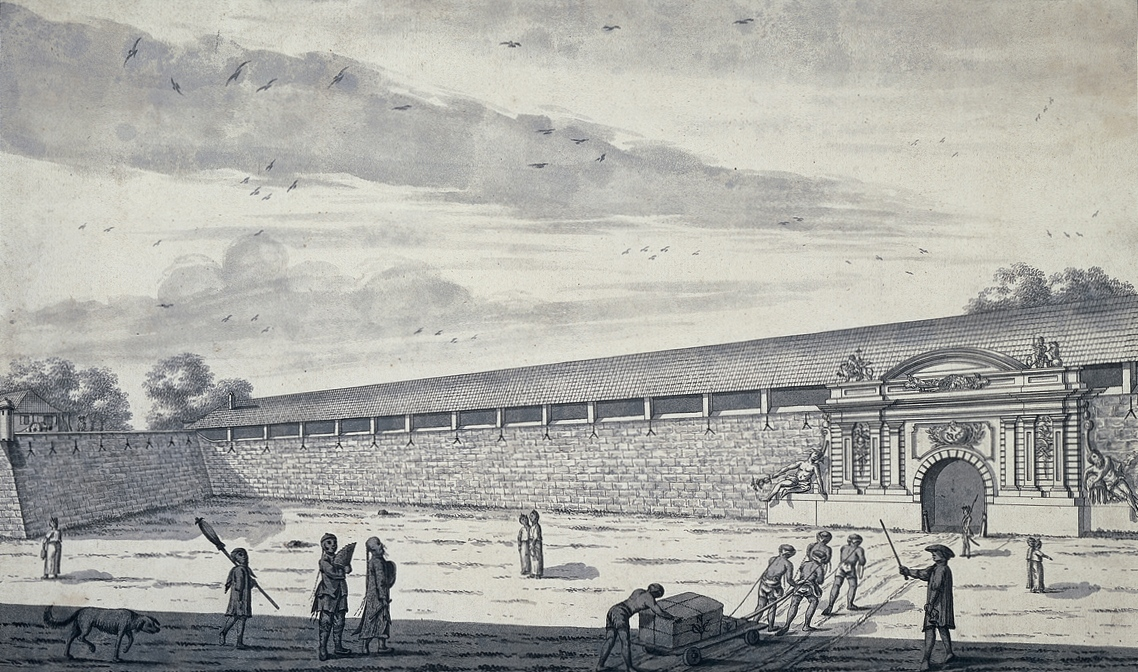
The sea-side portal of the Castle in 1767, the Waterpoort.

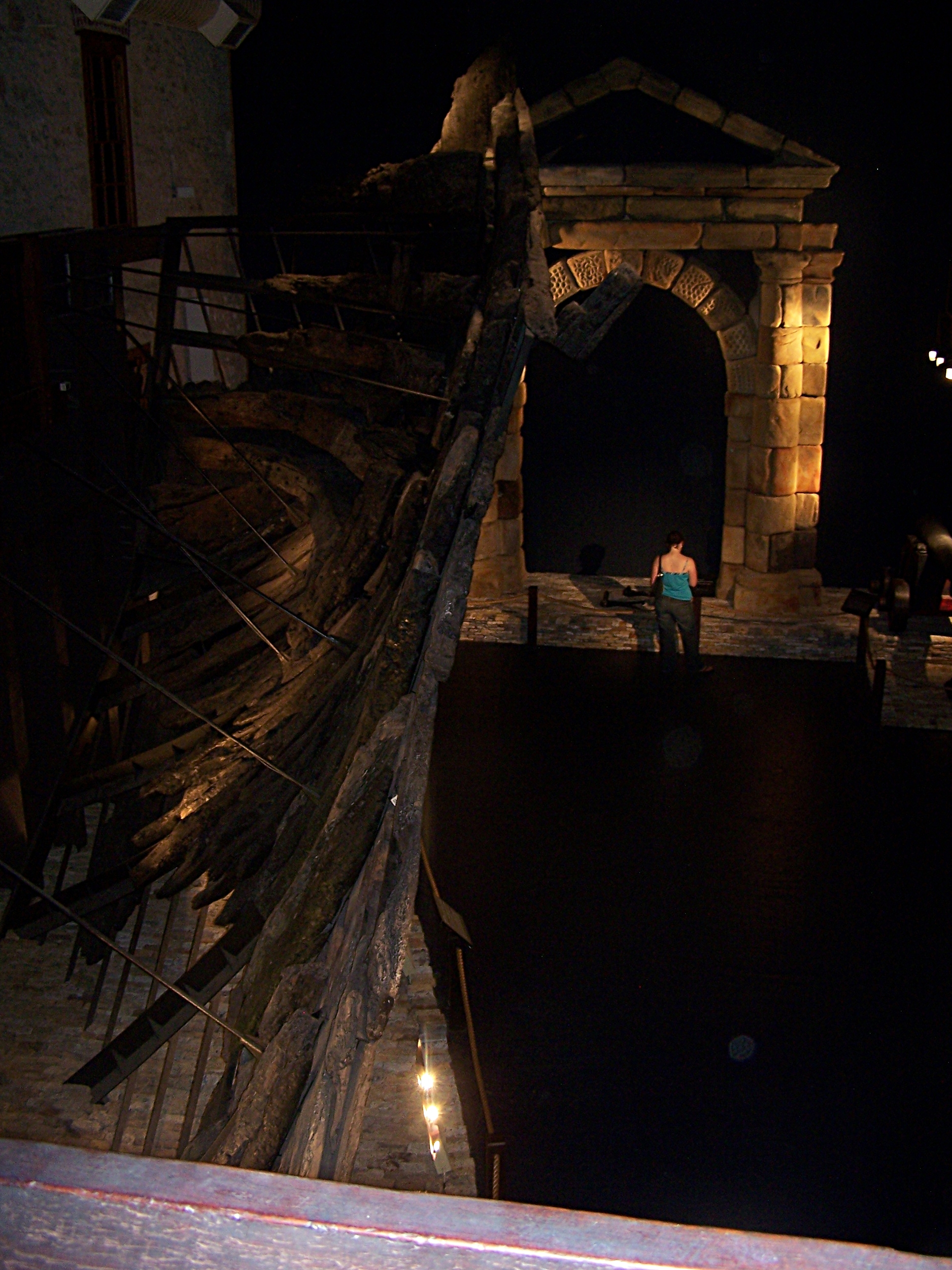
A portal salvaged from the wreck of Batavia, possibly intended to be installed for the Landpoort.

== See also ==
- List of colonial buildings and structures in Jakarta
- List of forts in Indonesia

== Works cited ==
- American Universities Field Staff (1966). Report Service: Southeast Asia series (Report). Indiana University.
- Grijns, Kees; Nas, Peter J.M., eds. (2000). Jakarta: socio-cultural essays (illustrated ed.). Leiden: KITLV Press. ISBN 9067181390.
- Huystee, Marit van (1994). The Lost Gateway of Jakarta: on the Portico of the VOC Castle of Batavia in 17th century Dutch East India (PDF) (Report). Department of Maritime Archaeology.
- Ito, E.S. (2007). Rahasia Meede: Misteri Harta Karun VOC [Secret of Meede: The Mystery of VOC Treasures] (in Indonesian). Jakarta: PT Mizan Publika. ISBN 9789791140997.
- "Jacatra Fort" [Jacatra Fort]. Ensiklopedi Jakarta (in Indonesian). Jakarta: Dinas Komunikasi, Informatika dan Kehumasan Pemprov DKI Jakarta. 2010. Archived from the original on 7 February 2016.
- Kaart van het Kasteel en de Stad Batavia in het Jaar 1667 [Map of the Castle and the City Batavia in year 1667] (Map) (Den Haag ed.). 50 rhijnlandsche roeden (in Dutch). Cartography by J.J. Bollee. G.B. Hooyer and J.W. Yzerman. 1919.
- "Kasteel van Batavia" [Batavia Castle]. Ensiklopedi Jakarta (in Indonesian). Jakarta: Dinas Komunikasi, Informatika dan Kehumasan Pemprov DKI Jakarta. 2010. Archived from the original on 4 March 2016.
- Lach, Donald F.; Kley, Edwin J. van (2000). Asia in the Making of Europe, Volume III: A Century of Advance. Book 3: Southeast Asia. Chicago: University of Chicago Press. ISBN 9780226466989.
- Kratoska, Paul H., ed. (2001). South East Asia, Colonial History: Imperialism before 1800. Volume 1 of South East Asia, Colonial History (illustrated ed.). London & New York: Taylor & Francis. ISBN 9780415215404.
- Restu Gunawan (2010). Gagalnya Sistem Kanal: Pengendalian Banjir Jakarta dari Masa ke Masa [The Failure of Canal System: Flood Control in Jakarta from Time to Time] (in Indonesian). Jakarta: PT Kompas Media Nusantara. ISBN 9789797094836.
- van Wamelen, Carla (2010). Family life onder de VOC: Een handelscompagnie in huwelijks- en gezinszaken [Family life under the East India Company: A trading company in marital and family matters] (in Dutch). Hivlersum: Verloren. ISBN 9789087044947.
