= Citadel Prins Frederik =

Coordinates: 6.170422°S 106.831162°E

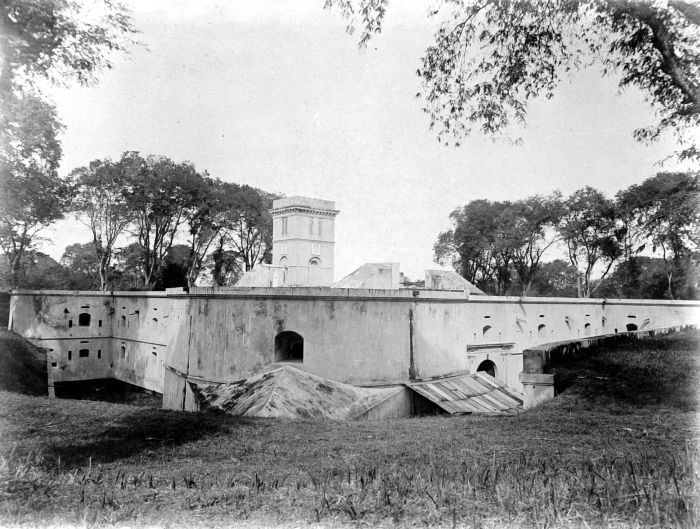
Citadel "Prins Hendrik" in Weltevreden

The Citadel Prins Frederik, also called Fort Prins Frederik, was a fortification built in 1837 by the Dutch in Batavia (now Jakarta), in the Dutch East Indies (now Indonesia). It was located at Wilhelmina Park, which demolished around 1961 and replaced by the Istiqlal Mosque.

The local people often referred to the fort as Gedung Tanah (The Ground Building).

== History ==
=== Origins ===
The site was once the location of a tavern, built before 1669. In 1723 sergeant-major Herman van Baijen rebuilt the tavern as a large country house. Later, from 1743 to 1820, the building was used as a hospital, called the Outer Hospital because it was outside the city walls.

The location was considered healthy since it was in the low hills inland from Batavia, so the risk of malaria was lower. The site was in what would become Wilhelmina Park in the Weltevreden area, today's Sawah Besar, between the two branches of the Ciliwung River. The surrounding countryside was extremely fertile, with deep, rich topsoil.

=== Construction ===
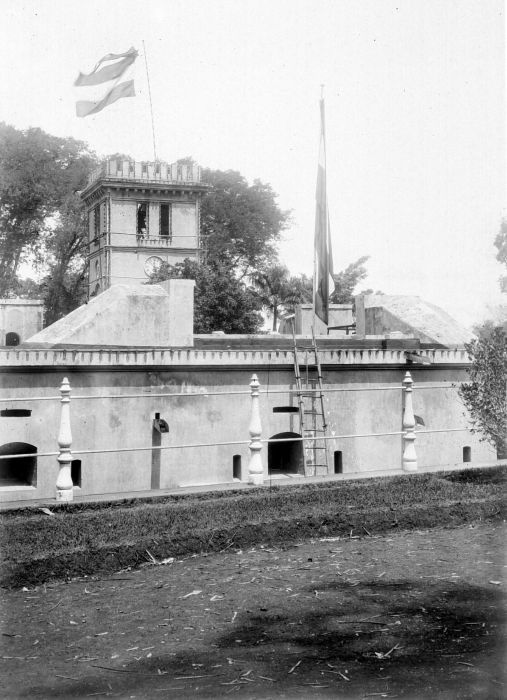
The fort before 1918

The fort was built in 1837 to the order of Governor-General Johannes van den Bosch as part of a planned line of defence in today's Kebon Sirih, Menteng. The engineer Colonel Carel van der Wyck designed the building, and Captain Lucius Gerhard Johan George Schonermarck was responsible for construction. Prince Willem Frederik Hendrik (1820–1879) laid the first stone, and later opened the fort. The citadel was named after the prince, one of the sons of King William II of the Netherlands and one of the few members of the royal family to visit the East Indies.

== Wilhelmina Park ==
Surrounding Citadel Prins Frederik was Wilhelmina Park, named after Queen Wilhelmina who was sworn-in in 1898. The park was built on the initiative of van den Bosch in 1834. The park had an area of 9.32 hectares, was known as the largest park ever in Batavia, even the largest modern park in Asia at the time. Aside from functioning as a vegetable garden for Dutch officers in the region, the Wilhelmina park was also one of the favorite sightseeing spots for Company officials, as well as landlords who settled around Weltevreden. The location of this park was in front of the Jakarta Cathedral Church.

There was also an Atjeh-Monument, built to commemorate the death of Dutch soldiers in the Aceh War. It was destroyed in 1961, a couple of months before the start of the building of the mosque.

== Structure ==
The fort was built from brick, and was protected by an earth rampart. It was rectangular, with a bastion at each corner. The windows could be used as portholes for cannon. A rectangular tower in the center had clocks, windows and doors on each side, and was used as a look-out. The defences were never put to the test, since no enemies attacked Batavia until 1942, by which time it was obsolete.

== See also ==
- Istiqlal Mosque, Jakarta
- List of forts
