= Jakarta Art Building =

Concert hall in Jakarta

- Indonesian: Gedung Kesenian Jakarta
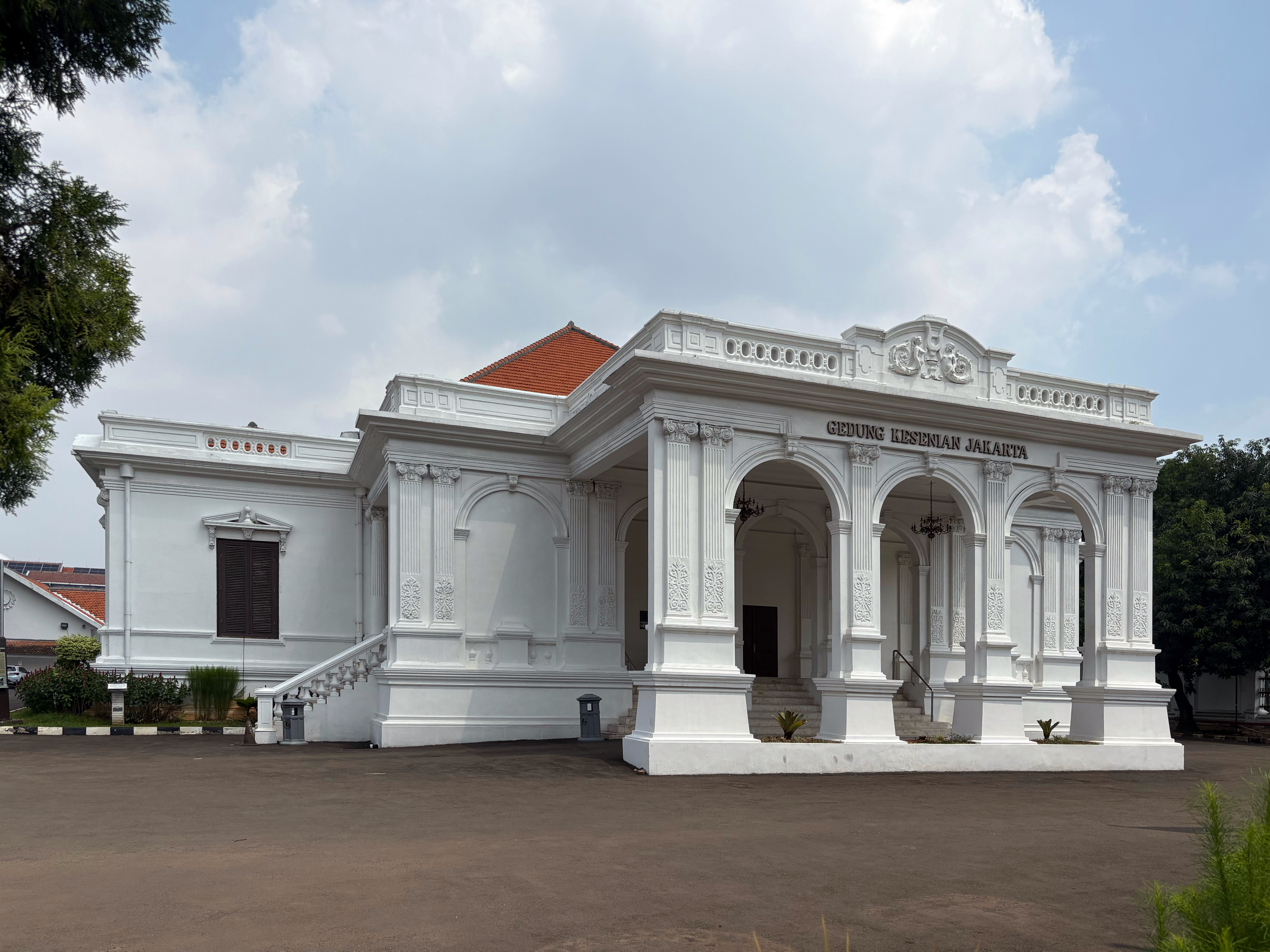
- Front entrance of Gedung Kesenian Jakarta
- Interactive map of the Jakarta Art Building area
- Former names: Batavia Schouwburg (Dutch colonial era), Sin'tsu Cekizyoo (Japanese occupation), Gedung Komidi

General information
- Type: Opera house
- Architectural style: Indische Empire style, Neoclassical architecture
- Location: Sawah Besar, Central Jakarta, Indonesia
- Coordinates: 6.166540°S 106.834417°E
- Inaugurated: 1821

Design and construction
- Architect: J.C. Schultze

Other information
- Public transit: Pasar Baru

Website
- gedungkesenianjakarta.co.id#/SELAMAT%20DATANG

The Jakarta Art Building (Indonesian: Gedung Kesenian Jakarta), historically known as Schouwburg Weltevreden, is a concert hall in Sawah Besar, Central Jakarta, Indonesia, built during the colonial period in Batavia, Dutch East Indies.

== History ==
The idea for the creation of a theater in Batavia (the colonial name for Jakarta) came from the Governor-General of Batavia at that time, Herman Willem Daendels. This idea was realized by Stamford Raffles, who was known for his passion for the study and preservation of local culture. It was built by English soldiers and had a capacity of 250 people.

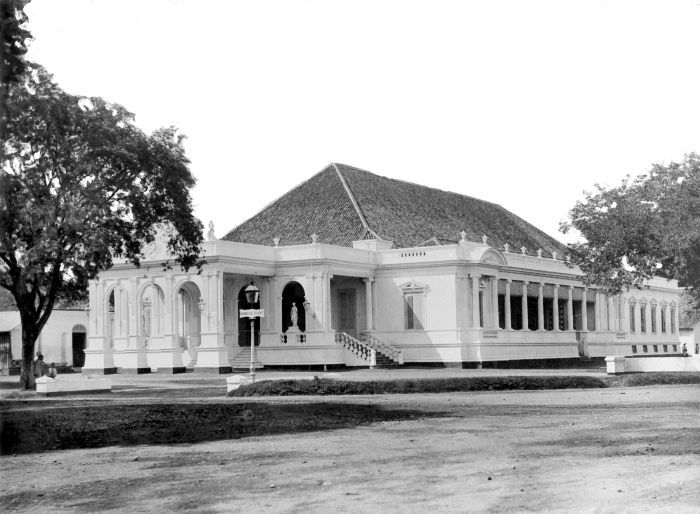
Gedung Kesenian Jakarta in the late 19th century

The architect chosen to design the building was J.C. Schultze (who also designed the Harmony Society, Batavia building. The new building was designed in Neoclassical style and was called Schouwburg Weltevreden, also popularly known as Gedung Komedi ("Comedy building").

In 1926, during Indonesia's period of National Awakening, the building was used by the local Youth Alliance for the first Kongres Pemoeda (Youth Congress).

During the independence era the building was used as a meeting place for a group of youth artists known as Seniman Merdeka, ("Independent Artists"), among whom were Rosihan Anwar, Usmar Ismail, El Hakim, and HB Jassin. On August 29, 1945, twelve days after the official declaration of independence of Indonesia, the first president of Indonesia, Sukarno, inaugurated the Central Indonesian National Committee, which had its first meeting in the building.

In 1951 the building was used by the Faculty of Economy and Law of Indonesia University. And from 1957 to 1961, the building was used by the Indonesian National Theater Academy.

On September 5, 1987, it was renamed the Gedung Kesenian Jakarta, replacing the former name Gedung Kesenian Pasar Baru.

== Facility ==
The building features two open halls (one on each side), the 24 by 17.5 metres (79 ft × 57 ft) main concert room with a balcony (capacity: 475 people), a stage measuring 10.75 by 14 by 17 metres (35.3 ft × 45.9 ft × 55.8 ft), and a "loge", which is basically an empty place to the right and left of the spectators, where five seats could be installed if required.

== See also ==
- Java
- Merdeka Square, Jakarta
