= Istana Negara (Jakarta) =

- Istana Negara
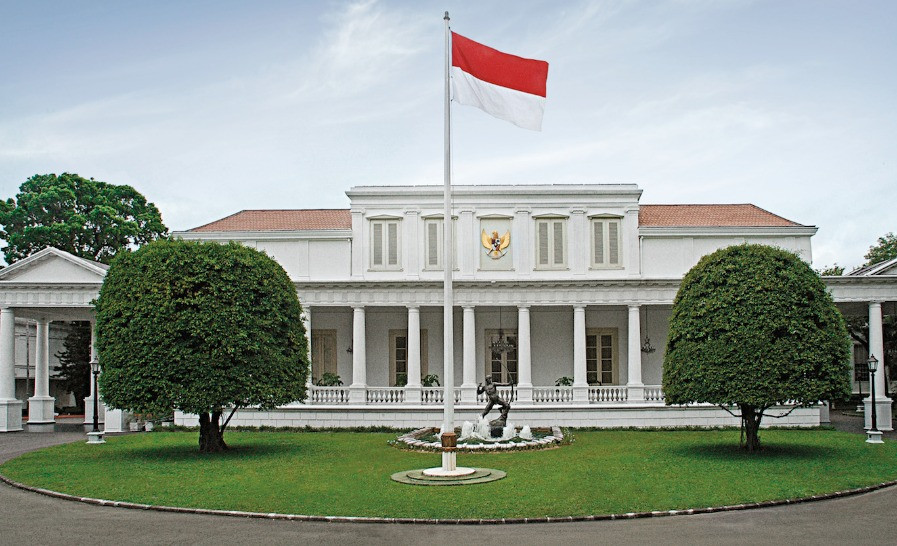
- Front facade of the Istana Negara, 2023
- Interactive map of the Istana Negara area
- Former names: Paleis te Rijswijk

General information
- Type: Official residence
- Architectural style: Indies Empire style
- Location: Jalan Veteran no. 17, Central Jakarta, Indonesia
- Coordinates: 06°10′05″S 106°49′26″E
- Current tenants: President of Indonesia
- Construction started: 1796
- Completed: 1804
- Client: Governor-General of the Dutch East Indies
- Owner: Government of Indonesia

Design and construction
- Architect: Jacob Andries van Braam

Istana Negara (English: State Palace, Dutch: Paleis te Rijswijk) is one of the seven presidential palaces of Indonesia. It is located on Veteran Street in Central Jakarta, with Merdeka Palace located south. It is part of the presidential palace compound which has a total area of 68,000 m^{2}, along with three other buildings: Bina Graha which was formerly used as the President's Office, Wisma Negara on the western side which is used as the state guest house, and the office for the Ministry of State Secretariat of Indonesia. Istana Negara faces north towards Veteran Street, while the Merdeka Palace faces Merdeka Square and the National Monument (Monas).

== History ==
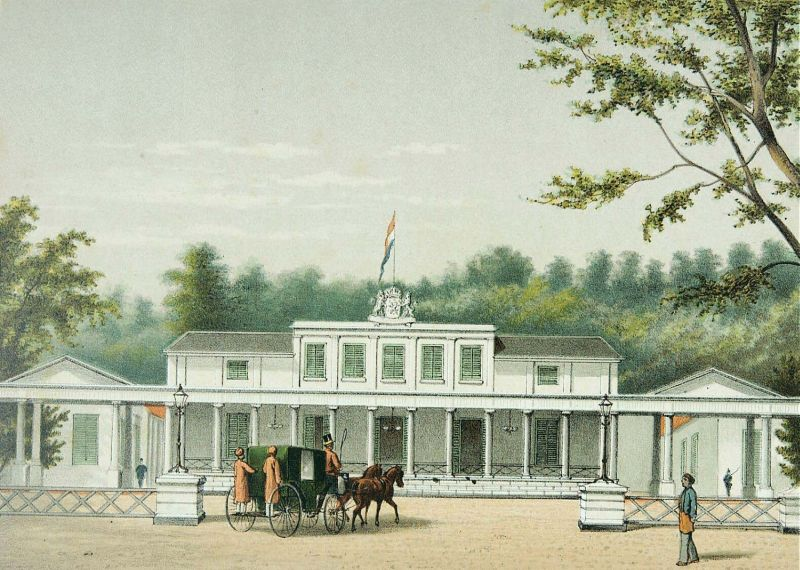
Lithograph of Paleis Rijswijk in the 1880s.

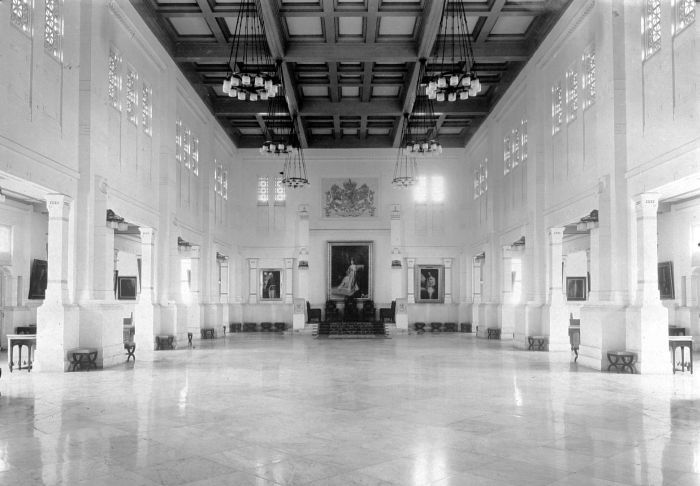
View of the reception hall of the palace in 1920s

=== The beginning ===
Construction of the building started in 1796. It was built by Jacob Andries van Braam, a Dutchman who between 1810 and 1819 held several high positions in government, to be made his residence. It was an elegant two-floored building designed in the Indies Empire style, a popular style of architecture during the late 18th century. The building was built in the neighborhood of Rijswijk-Molenvliet (present Harmoni), which was among the most exclusive neighborhood in Batavia's Bovenstad ("uptown") at that time. The building was built during the tenure of Governor General Pieter Gerardus van Overstraten, shortly after the completion of another lavish residence which later would become Hotel der Nederlanden. Construction took several years, and the building was finally completed in 1804.

=== The English period ===
Upon the completion of the building, the building was handed over to Hugh Hope, the British commissioner when the country was under British rule. Van Braam lived in a smaller wing to the south of the building throughout his life.

=== Residence of the governor-general ===
After the death of J.A. van Braam, the house was brought over by the Dutch government in 1821. The government used this building as the center of all administration and as the official residence of the governor-general during a stay in Batavia. The much larger building that was intended by Daendels to become the official residence of the governor-general of the Dutch Indies in Waterlooplein was delayed, and so it was never used as a residence for the governor-general, even after its completion in 1828. As the official residence of the governor-general, van Braam's residence was officially named Hotel van den Gouverneur-Generaal (Hotel of the Governor-General).

Important occasions such as formal ceremonies or the Indies Council Meeting every Wednesday were held in the palace. Godert van der Capellen became the first governor-general to officially reside in the palace in 1820. However, Bogor Palace (Paleis te Buitenzorg) in Bogor (Buitenzorg) became the main residence, as most of the governor-generals preferred the temperate climate in the hillsides of Bogor.

In 1848, the first floor of the building was removed and the room which faced the Koningsplein was redesigned to be more open to the exterior.

=== Expansion: Istana Merdeka ===
Later the palace became too cramped with increasing administrative needs, and thus a new palace was planned in 1869. The new palace was completed in 1873 facing Koningsplein (King's Square) and it would be known as Koningsplein Palace. Together the palace would form the governor-general's palace compound in Rijswijk.

In 1875, the complex was equipped with new iron fencing. Additional houses were built to accommodate the officials of the palace.

=== Japanese occupation ===
In 1942, the Japanese successfully invaded the Dutch East Indies. Governor-General Tjarda Van Starkenborch signed a capitulation to the Japanese army in the palace on 8 March 1942. Under the Japanese, the palace became the residence of the Saiko Shikikan (army commander) until the Japanese surrender in 1945. After the independence, the lion emblem of the Netherlands on the front facade of the building was removed.

Since its existence, many important events have taken place in this building. Some of these include the declaration of the cultuur stelsel system by the Governor-General Graaf van den Bosch, the ratification ceremony of the Linggadjati Agreement on 25 March 1947, and the recognition of Indonesia's independence on 27 December 1949.

== Role of the palace and features ==
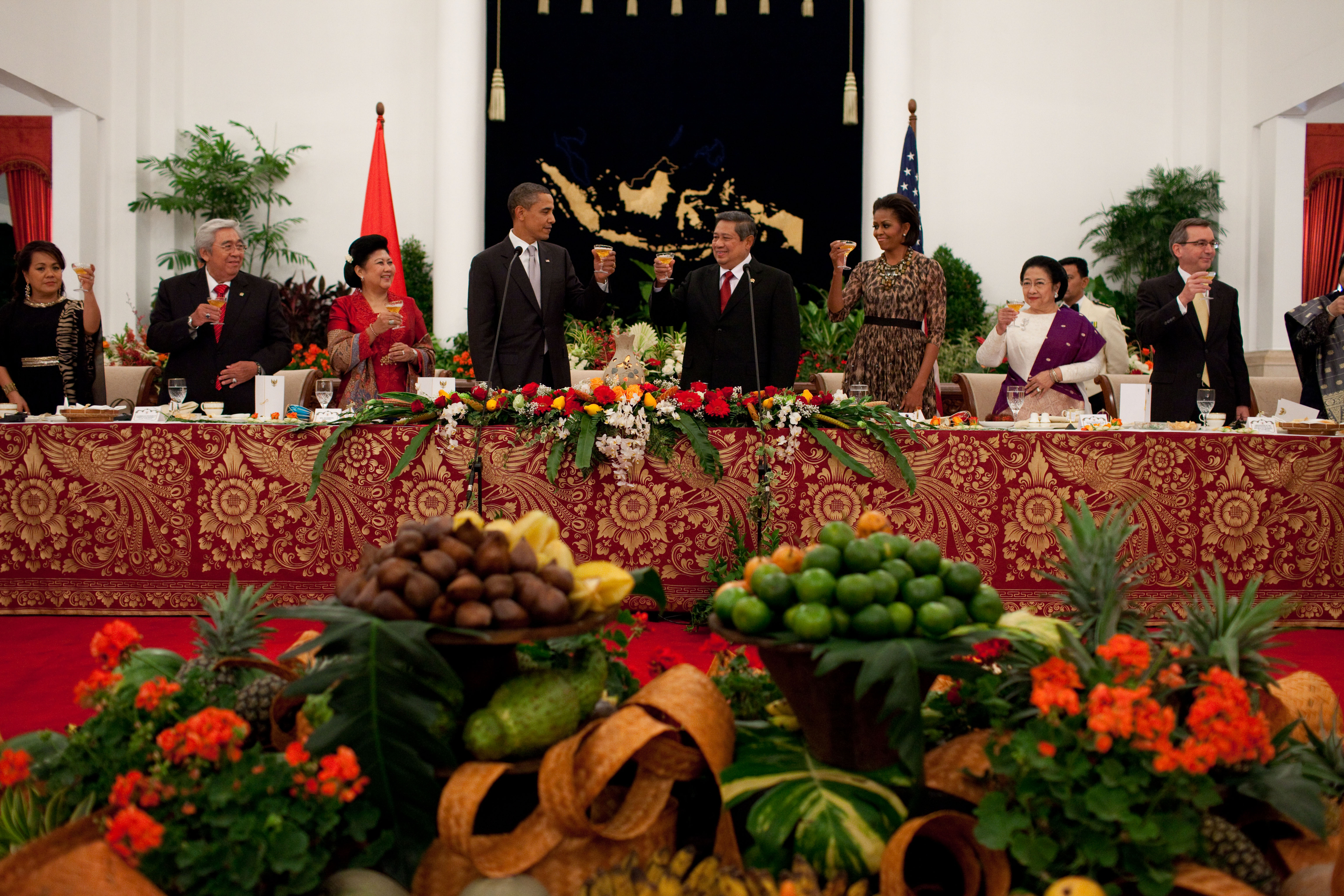
State banquet in Istana Negara during President Obama's visit in 2010

The architecture of the Merdeka Palace was done in a style known as the Indies Empire style, a popular style of architecture in the early 19th-century Batavia. During the early days, the 3.375 m^{2} building had two stories. In 1848, the upper floor was partly demolished, and the lower expanded to accommodate more individuals, and thus present a more formal portrayal. The palace mainly functions as the main venue for stately ceremonial activities such as appointments of ministers, conference and national meeting opening ceremonies, the opening of international and national congresses, national banquets, and cultural performances. It also serves as an administrative office for the Head of state.

The front part of the palace contains the main reception hall, which is used mainly for gifts of state exchanges and is located next to the banquet hall. Other chambers in the palace consist of a front room, a living room, a suite for the vice president, a guest waiting room, and the president's office. The palace consists of two main audience halls named Ruang Upacara and Ruang Jamuan, each connected with a corridor decorated with various paintings. During the colonial era, Ruang Upacara (Ceremonial Hall) was formerly a ballroom. As its name states, the room is used for formal ceremonial events in the palace. In the room, there are Javanese and Balinese Gamelan sets used for cultural performance purposes and a podium. The Ruang Jamuan (Banquet Hall) is used to provide hospitality and repasts to state guests within the palace. It has a capacity of 150 people and is decorated with a painting of Ratu Kidul by Basoeki Abdullah.

== See also ==
- List of colonial buildings and structures in Jakarta
- Cipanas Palace
- Vice Presidential Palace (Indonesia)
- List of palaces in Indonesia

== Works cited ==
- Dinas Museum dan Sejarah (1986). Sejarah Singkat Gedung-Gedung Tua di Jakarta [Brief History of Old Buildings in Jakarta] (in Indonesian). Jakarta: Pemerintah Daerah Khusus Ibukota Jakarta.
- Djawatan Penerangan Kotapradja Djakarta Raya (1957). Djakarta Dewasa Ini [Jakarta Today] (in Indonesian). Jakarta: Djawatan Penerangan Kotapradja Djakarta Raya.
