= Jalan Daan Mogot =

Road in Jakarta, Indonesia

- Daan Mogot
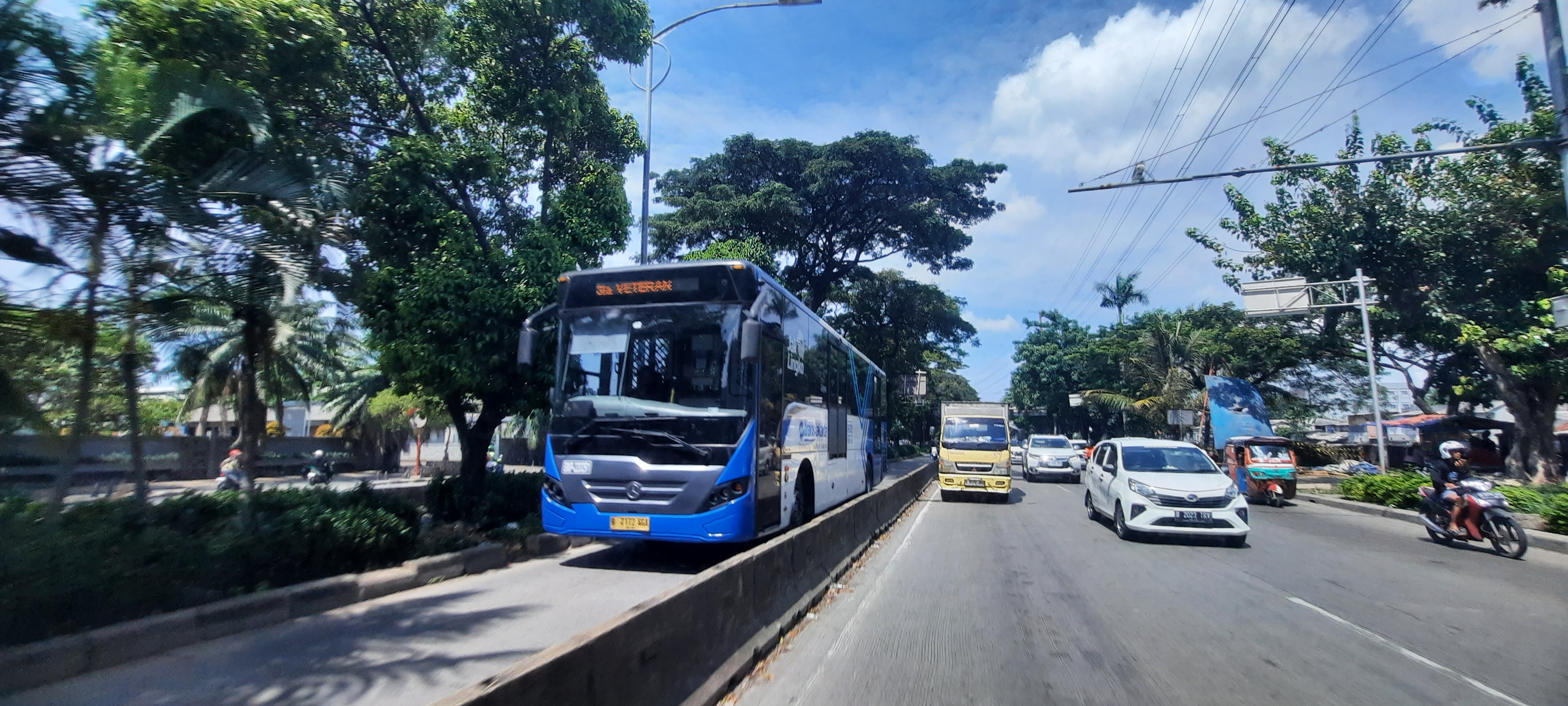
- Daan Mogot Road at Cengkareng, West Jakarta
- Length: 27.5 km (17.1 mi)
- Location: Greater Jakarta
- From: Grogol, West Jakarta
- To: Sukarasa, Tangerang, Tangerang

Jalan Daan Mogot is one of the main avenues in Jakarta, Indonesia. The road is named after a military officer involved in the struggle for Indonesian independence Daan Mogot. This road stretches along 27.5 KM from Grogol, West Jakarta to Sukarasa, Tangerang, Tangerang. After entering Tangerang, this road continues to Jalan Merdeka and Jalan Gatot Subroto (Jalan Raya Serang). This road is part of Indonesian National Route 1. This road crosses 14 urban villages, namely

- Sukarasa, Tangerang, Tangerang
- Suka Asih, Tangerang, Tangerang
- Tanah Tinggi, Tangerang, Tangerang
- Batuceper, Tangerang
- Kebon Besar, Batuceper, Tangerang
- Kalideres, West Jakarta
- West Cengkareng, Cengkareng, West Jakarta
- East Cengkareng, Cengkareng, West Jakarta
- Kedaung Kali Angke, Cengkareng, West Jakarta
- Wijaya Kusuma, Grogol Petamburan, West Jakarta
- Kedoya Utara, Kebon Jeruk, West Jakarta
- Duri Kepa, Kebon Jeruk, West Jakarta
- Jelambar, Grogol Petamburan, West Jakarta
- Tanjung Duren Utara, Grogol Petamburan, West Jakarta

== Intersection ==
There are twelve intersections, they are:

- Taruna Heroes Cemetery Street Intersection
- Pembangunan 3 Street and Jenderal Sudirman Street (Tangerang) Intersection
- Entrance/Exit of the Cengkareng–Batu Ceper–Kunciran section of Jakarta Outer Ring Road 2
- Maulana Hassanusin Street Intersection
- Peta Selatan Street Intersection
- Tampak Siring Street Intersection
- Cengkareng Intersection, to Lingkar Luar Barat Street and Jakarta Outer Ring Road 1
- Dharma Wanita IV Street Intersection
- Intersection to Casa Jardin Residence (Indosat Ooredoo Hutchison Satellite Station)
- Panjang Raya Street Intersection
- Pangeran Tubagus Angke Street Intersection
- Grogol Intersection, to Prof. Dr. Latumenen Street (north), Kyai Tapa Street (east), and Letjen S. Parman Street (south)

== Transportation ==
=== Bus Routes ===
==== TransJakarta ====
This road is passed by TransJakarta corridor 3 (from Kalideres to Jelambar BRT Station). It is also served by APTB, Mayasari Bakti and Kopaja buses. There are nine BRT stations:

Sorted from west to east

- Pesakih
- Sumur Bor
- Rawa Buaya
- Jembatan Baru
- Pulo Nangka
- Jembatan Gantung
- Taman Kota
- Damai
- Jelambar

Transjakarta routes that serves the Daan Mogot street are:

- BRT Corridor
  - Kalideres–Monumen Nasional via Veteran
  - Lebak Bulus–Pasar Baru via Tomang
- Cross-corridor routes
  - Rawa Buaya–Pulo Gadung
  - Kalideres–Senayan Bank Jakarta

==== Other buses ====
Besides Transjakarta, here are the list of bus services that passes the Daan Mogot Street

- Mayasari Bakti
  - AC42A Kalideres-Cileungsi (via Daan Mogot - Grogol - Slipi - Tol - Tol Cibubur)
- Angkot
  - Kalideres-Serpong (via Daan Mogot - Poris Plawad - Cikokol - Serpong Raya - Muncul)
  - Cengkareng-Cikokol (via Daan Mogot - Poris Plawad - Cikokol)
  - Kalideres-Kotabumi
  - Kalideres-Cadas
  - Cikokol-Dadap (via Jend. Sudirman - Poris Plawad - Daan Mogot - Halim Perdanakusuma - Husein Sastranegara - Raya Prancis - Villa Taman Bandara)

== See also ==
- Daan Mogot
- KH Hasyim Asy'ari Grand Mosque
- History of Jakarta
