= Pantai Indah Kapuk =

Planned township in Jakarta, Indonesia

Coordinates: 6°08′S 106°45′E

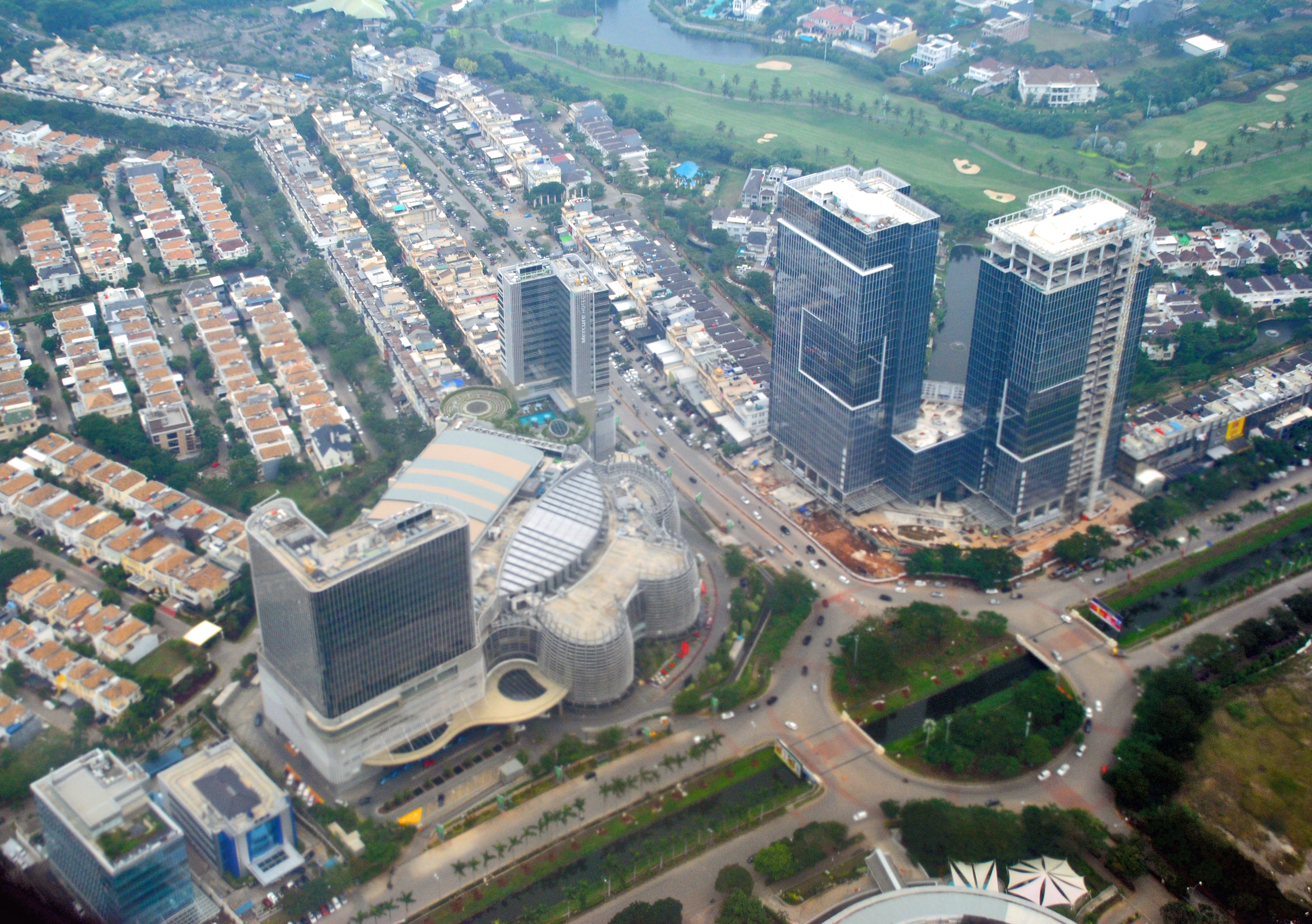
- Aerial view of Pantai Indah Kapuk
- Interactive map of Pantai Indah Kapuk
- Other name: PIK
- Location: North Jakarta and Tangerang Regency, Indonesia
- Opening: c. 1990s

Companies
- Developer: Agung Sedayu Group

Pantai Indah Kapuk (PIK) is a large-scale planned township and mixed-use coastal development located in northwestern Jakarta, Indonesia. The development spans parts of Penjaringan in North Jakarta, as well as Kapuk in West Jakarta and Kosambi in Tangerang Regency.

Developed beginning in the 1990s by Agung Sedayu Group, Pantai Indah Kapuk comprises gated residential estates alongside commercial districts, retail centres, hospitality venues, and recreational amenities. The township is connected to central Jakarta and Soekarno–Hatta International Airport via the Prof. Dr. Sedyatmo Toll Road and the western section of the Jakarta Outer Ring Road.

Since the 2010s, the broader PIK development area has expanded through adjacent reclamation and satellite projects, including Golf Island and the PIK 2 extension in Tangerang Regency, incorporating tourism-oriented commercial zones such as Pantjoran PIK and other waterfront developments.

== History ==
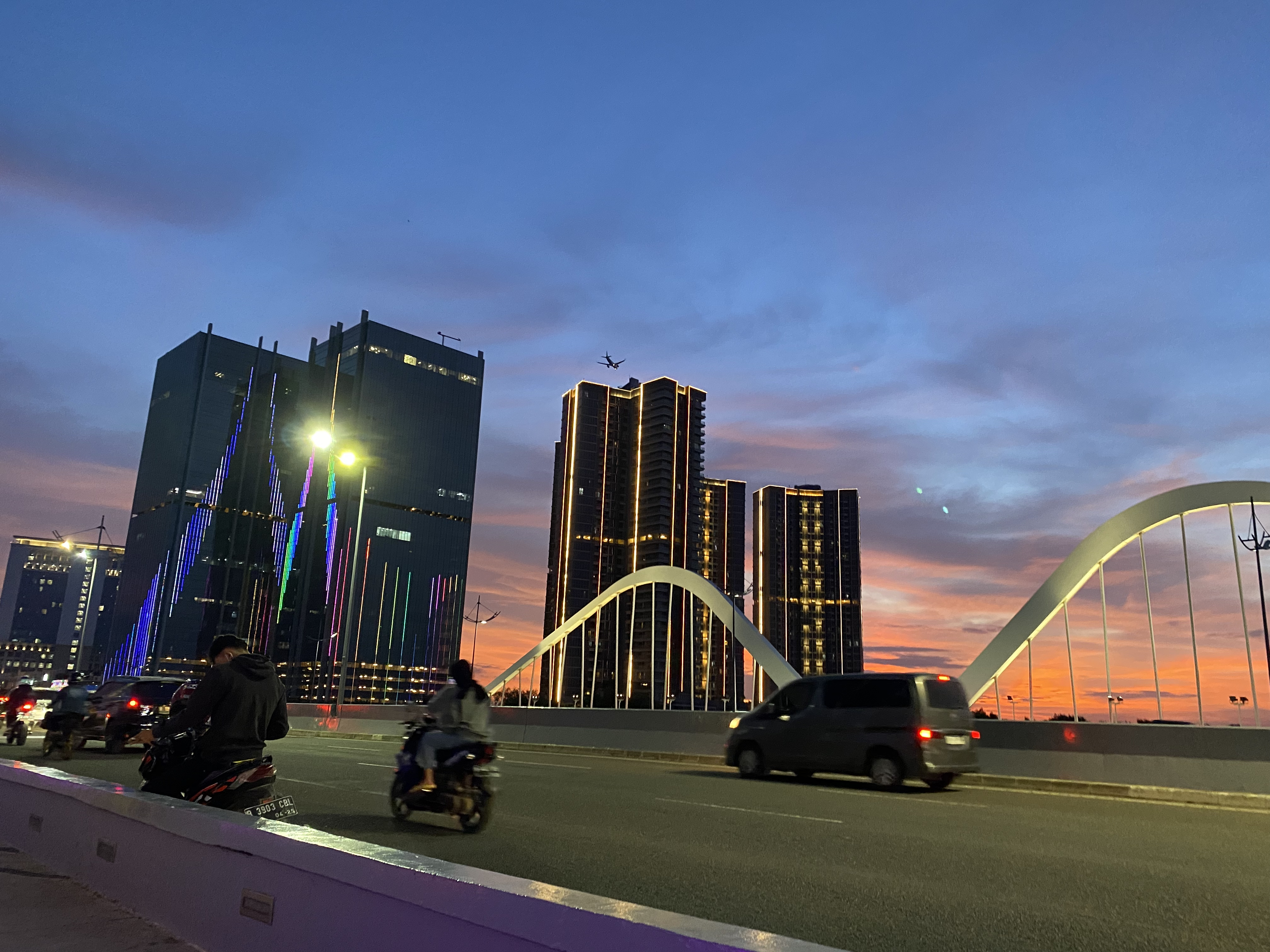
A bridge connecting the reclaimed island with the mainland

PIK was historically part of the particuliere landerij, or private domain of Kapoek. The estate was owned by Tan Eng Goan, 1st Majoor der Chinezen of Batavia (1802-1872), and was later purchased by his successor (no relation), the 2nd Majoor Tan Tjoen Tiat (1816 — 1880).

In the early 20th century, it became part of the landholdings of N.V. Landbouw Maatschappij Tan Tiang Po, a landholding company belonging to Majoor Tan Eng Goan's grandson-inlaw, Luitenant der Chinezen Tan Tiang Po and of the latter's son, Tan Liok Tiauw, Landheeren (or landlords) of Batoe-Tjepper.

In 1988, the property developer Ciputra, backed by Indonesia's wealthiest man at the time Sudono Salim, acquired the area and developed today's housing estate of Pantai Indah Kapuk, earmarked as a wealthy suburb of gated communities. Now, it is owned by Sugianto Kusuma's PT Agung Sedaya and Harris Then's PT Tunas Mekar Jaya.

== PIK 2 expansion project ==
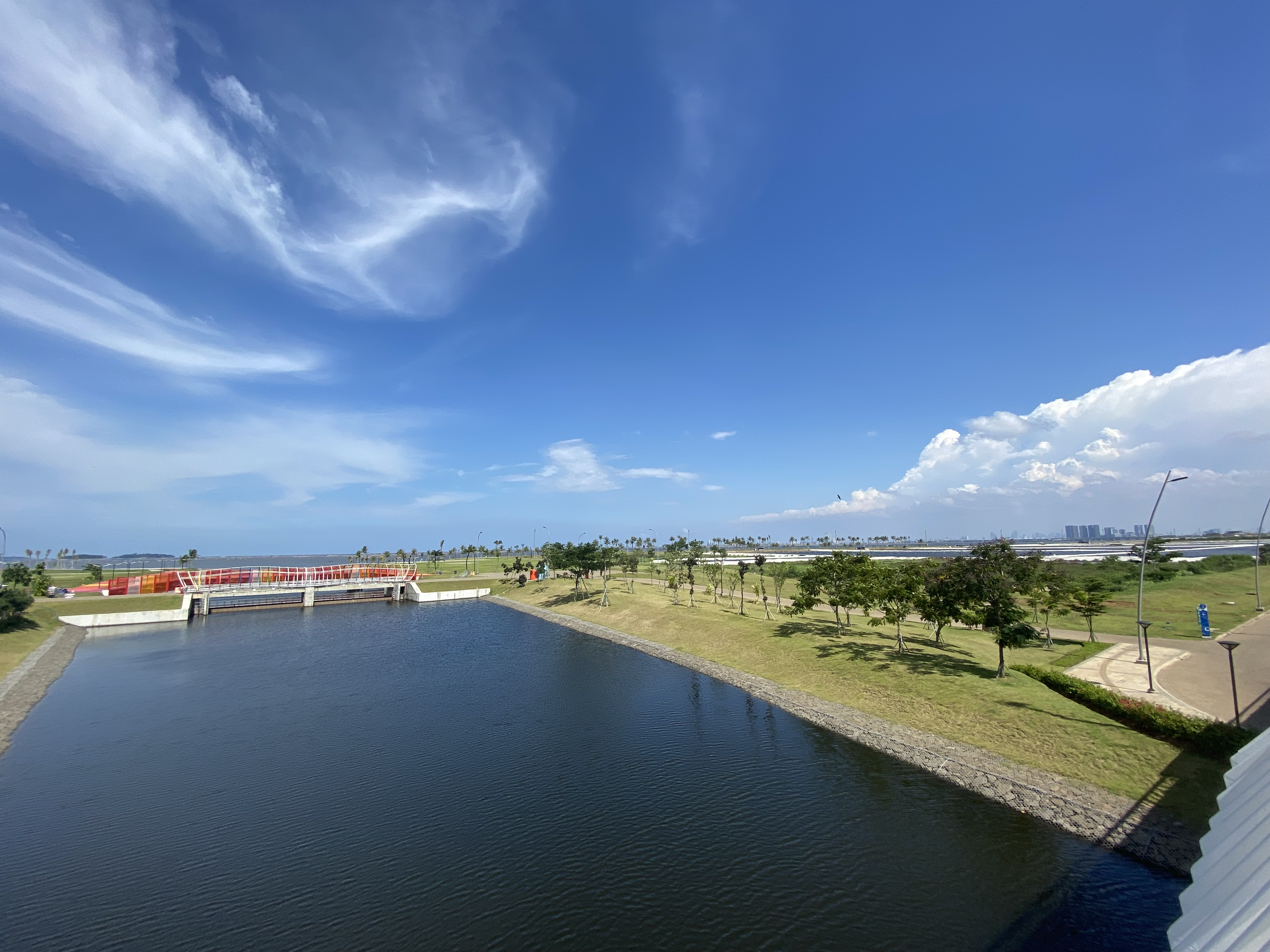
PIK 2 green belt

PIK 2 is an extension of the existing PIK area. Located in Kosambi, Tangerang Regency, Banten, it is designed as a waterfront city with a futuristic design and comprehensive facilities for a better quality of urban life. After completion, it will be a destination for activities, work, tourism and cuisine. It has also become one of the largest development projects in the Jabodetabek (Jakarta metropolitan area) area, spanning roughly 2,650 hectares.

In 2024, PIK 2 was made into a National Strategic Project (Indonesian: Proyek Strategis Nasional) by the Indonesian Government.

=== Projects ===
There have been many new projects and buildings constructed since the development started. Projects including Indonesia Design District (IDD) which opened on the 16 August 2023, has attracted many tourists to the area. Other projects such as Lands End, Aloha White Sand Beach, Orange Groves, and the Nusantara International Convention Exhibition (NICE) have been constructed in the PIK 2 area and has also been a popular tourist spots.

== Education ==
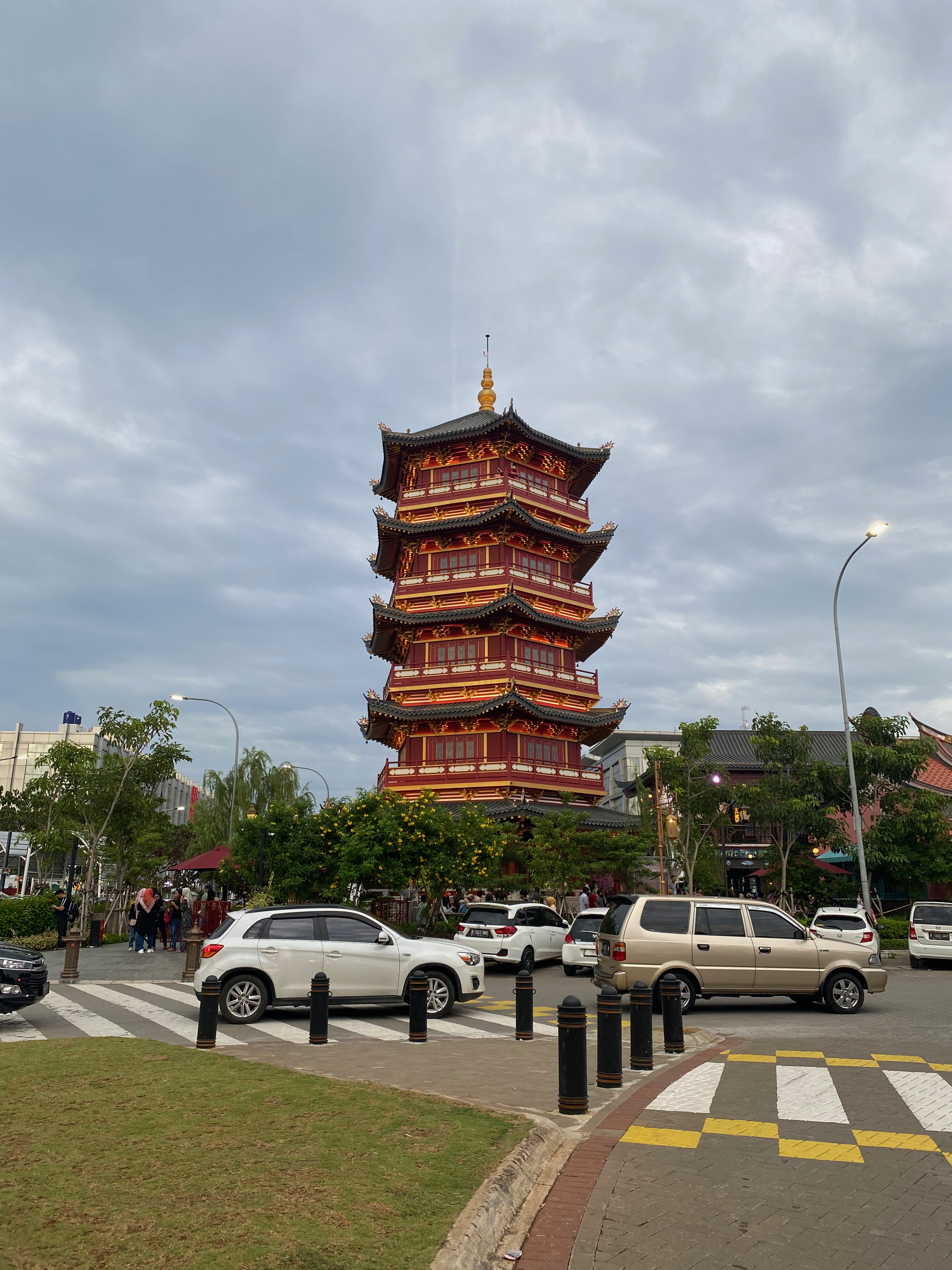
Pantjoran PIK Chinatown at the reclaimed island

PIK is also known for its many education facilities which include:

- Tzu Chi School (慈济国际学校)
- Singapore Intercultural School
- Pelangi Kasih School
- Bina Bangsa School (培民学校)
- Stella Maris International School
- BPK Penabur PIK
- St. Nicholas School (圣尼古拉学校)

== Transportation ==
Pantai Indah Kapuk is connected to the Soedijatmo Toll Road via Kamal–Teluknaga–Rajeg (Katara) Toll Road that links to the Soekarno–Hatta International Airport, and the western section of the Jakarta Outer Ring Road (JORR).

For public transit, Transjakarta provides two bus routes: route 1A (Pantai Maju–Balai Kota) and route T31 (PIK 2–Blok M), both routes serve the existing PIK 1 and PIK 2 extension project. Route 1A is the first route to serve the proper, opened in 2014 as BKTB (Bus Kota Terintegrasi Busway, lit. 'Busway-Integrated City Bus'). Route T31 was commenced on 22 May 2025, as part of Transjakarta's cross-border (Transjabodetabek) feeder network expansion. Aside from Transjakarta, PIK developer Agung Sedayu Group also operates its own shuttle bus network serving both PIK 1 and PIK 2, and also a connection to Sedayu City at Kelapa Gading.

== Controversy ==
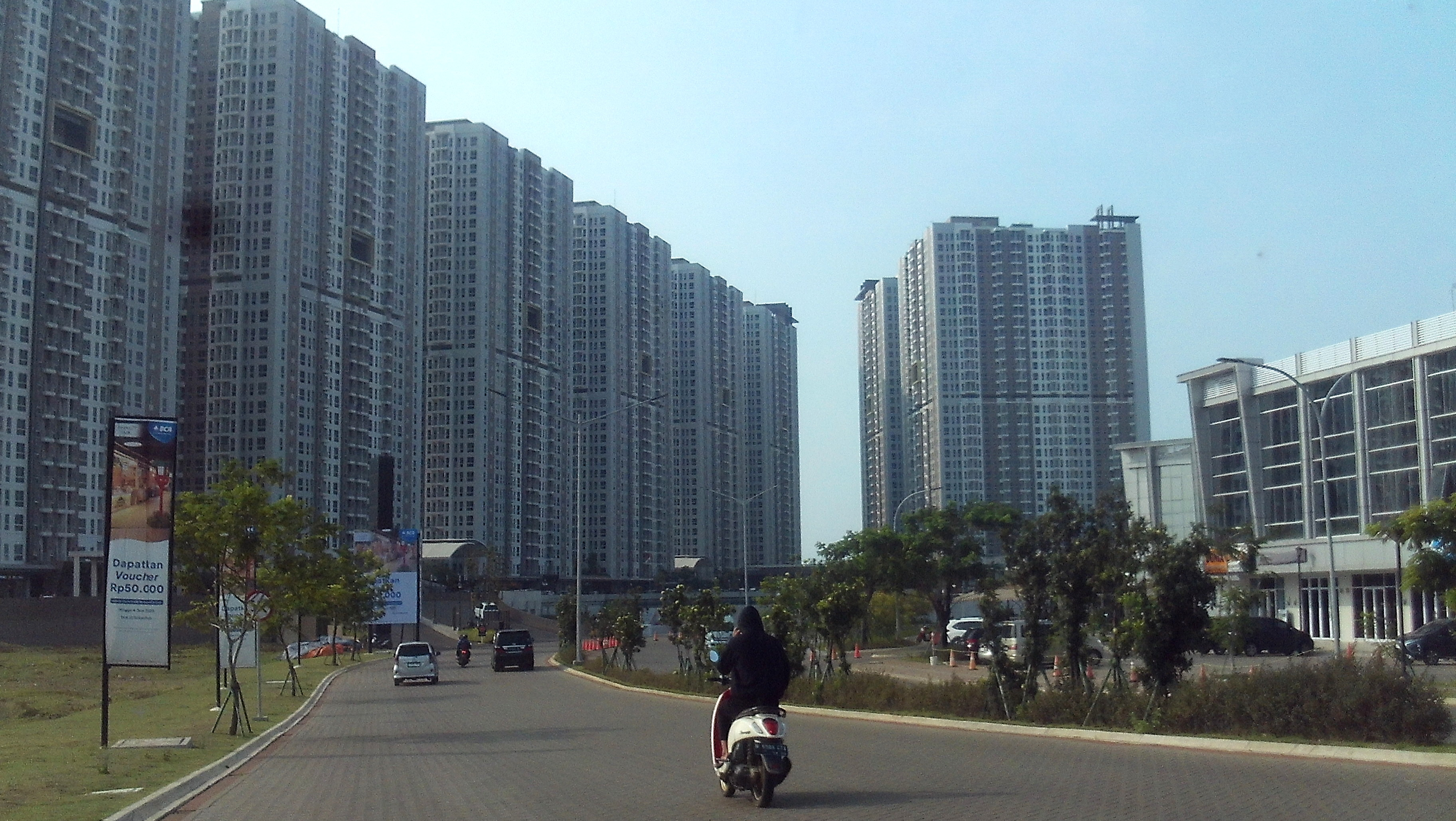
Tokyo Riverside Apartment in Pantai Indah Kapuk 2

The development of Pantai Indah Kapuk has been the subject of longstanding environmental and regulatory concerns. According to a study on new town development in Indonesia, the approximately 1,160-hectare project was constructed beginning in 1989 on land previously consisting of mangrove forests and coastal swamps. The initial development approvals were issued during the tenure of then Minister of Forestry Hasjrul Harahap and Jakarta Governor Wiyogo Atmodarminto.

Urban planning disputes have also arisen in relation to the site's zoning designation. Under the Jakarta master land-use plans of 1985 and 2005, the area had previously been classified as part of a protected green belt, before being redesignated for residential use in 1995. Civil society organisations have alleged that aspects of the project contributed to increased flood risk in adjacent areas such as Penjaringan, and have raised the possibility of legal action on the grounds of non-compliance with earlier spatial planning regulations.

== See also ==
- North Jakarta
- Chinatown
- Chinese Indonesian
