= Citra Garden City =

Township in Jakarta Indonesia

Citra Garden City is an integrated township at Cengkareng and Kalideres sub-districts of Jakarta, Indonesia. The project is being developed by Ciputra Residence since 1984, which has a land area of about 450 hectares. This is one of the largest housing project in West Jakarta. As of 2016 there are more than ten thousands housing unit with more than 50 thousands population.

== Facilities ==
This integrated township is divided into clusters/sectors with different name. It has commercial, recreational, and public facilities, including a water Treatment Plant, a family Club, sports facilities, meeting halls, a traditional and modern marketplace, educational, and health facilities. There is an artificial lake and green area that functions as water basin for processing clean water, as well as helps to control flood to its surrounding areas. There is a modern hospital in the township, which was started in December, 2015.

== See also ==
- Cengkareng
