= Setiabudi 13 case =

Unsolved Indonesian cold case

- Born: Approx. 1960–1963; Unknown
- Status: Unidentified for 43 years, 8 months and 24 days
- Died: c. 21 November 1981; Unknown. Possibly Jalan Jenderal Sudirman, Setiabudi, South Jakarta
- Cause of death: Multiple stab wounds
- Resting place: Tegal Alur cemetery, Kalideres, West Jakarta
- Known for: Unidentified victim of homicide
- Height: 5 ft 5 in (1.65 m) (approximate)

The Setiabudi 13 case (Indonesian: Kasus Setiabudi 13) is a cold case of unsolved murder of an unidentified mutilated man found on 23 November 1981 on the sidewalk of Jalan Jenderal Sudirman, Setiabudi, South Jakarta. Due to the extreme violence and uncertainty of the case, this case is considered as the first mutilation case in modern Indonesian crime history, one of the most gruesome, and one of the most mysterious cases in Indonesia. The case is called "Setiabudi 13" since the mutilated body was found in 13 pieces and was found in Setiabudi district, South Jakarta.

Mun'im Idris, a forensic expert who performed the autopsy of the body, said that it was the most brutal, vicious, and the most haunting case he had ever handled. According to Idris, this gruesome case is very disturbing, because despite there were plenty of forensic clues, e.g. victim's fingerprints and face was quite intact and it should be identifiable, the police has been unable to uncover the victim's identity.

== Chronology ==
In the morning of 23 November 1981, two security guards of PT Garuda Mataram Motor found two cardboard boxes on the sidewalk of Jalan Jenderal Sudirman, Setiabudi, South Jakarta, right across Wisma Arthaloka building (today Bank Muamalat building). The two cardboard boxes attracted the attention of the two security guards because the boxes emanated a foul stench and was surrounded by flies. The two security guards immediately reported the discovery of the suspicious cardboard boxes to a policeman who was directing the traffic nearby. However, because the policeman was busy, this report was ignored.

The two boxes continued to lie on the side of the road until they were approached by two homeless garbage scavengers (Indonesian: pemulung) who subsequently opened the boxes. When opened, they found a mutilated body; the first box contained thirteen bones and a head, in which the flesh was removed from the bones. The severed head, however, was quite intact. The second box contained 180 pieces of human flesh, including internal organs such as lung, liver, and spleen. Some body markings such as fingerprints, palms, foot soles, and parts of face and head were not removed, meanwhile body parts such as anus, bladder and pancreas were missing.

=== Autopsy result ===
The autopsy of the body was carried out for approximately two hours. Mun'im Idris said that the victim was slaughtered systematically and slashed in a similar fashion to a "spit roasted goat" (Indonesian: kambing guling). According to the investigation, the unidentified male victim was estimated to be 18 to 21 years old, had a height of 165 cm, had the condition of phimosis, and had a sturdy body and slightly overweight. The victim was killed and mutilated about one or two days prior to when the body was found.

According to Idris, the victim was killed by stabbing using a knife, due to wound marks found on the chest, back and abdomen. In less than 24 hours after the victim was murdered, it was exposed to water, as seen from the wrinkling of its fingertips. The bones were clean and the flesh pieces were free from blood as if it was cleansed with water, which suggested that the mutilation was possibly done in a bathroom. According to forensic doctor estimations, the slaughter and mutilation took place between 21 November to the early dawn of 22 November 1981.

The fingerprint test results did not match any existing fingerprint database. According to the estimation of the crime investigator, the mutilations were presumably carried out by more than one person and were estimated to have lasted for about 3 to 4 hours.

Hundreds of people who claimed the loss of family and relatives came during the identification process. However, from various information collected by the police, the body did not match any person being sought. The identification process lasted until 27 November 1981. The victim was buried in Tegal Alur cemetery in Kalideres, West Jakarta. Until now, this case remains unsolved.

== See also ==
- List of unsolved murders (1980–1999)
