= Kapuk, Cengkareng =

Kapuk
- Subdistrict
- Kelurahan Kapuk
- Interactive map of Kapuk
- Country: Indonesia
- Province: DKI Jakarta
- Administrative city: West Jakarta
- District: Cengkareng
- Postal code: 11720

Kapuk (Chinese: 卡普) is a subdistrict in the Cengkareng district of Indonesia. An industrial area, Kapuk is nonetheless also home to part of Pantai Indah Kapuk, one of Jakarta's most prestigious suburbs.

== History ==
Kapuk formed part of the particuliere landerij or private domain of Tan Eng Goan, 1st Majoor der Chinezen of Batavia, and later of his successor, the 2nd Majoor Tan Tjoen Tiat.

It later formed part of the landholdings of N.V. Landbouw Maatschappij Tan Tiang Po, a colonial company belonging to Luitenant der Chinezen Tan Tiang Po and his son, Tan Liok Tiauw, Landheeren (or landlords) of Batoe-Tjepper.

In 1988, the property developer Ciputra, backed by Indonesia's wealthiest man at the time Sudono Salim, developed the housing estate of Pantai Indah Kapuk, earmarked as a wealthy suburb of gated communities.

Kapuk's postal code is 11720.

== See also ==
- Pantai Indah Kapuk
- Cengkareng
- List of administrative villages of Jakarta
