= Rawa Buaya, Cengkareng =

Rawa Buaya
- Subdistrict
- Interactive map of Rawa Buaya
- Country: Indonesia
- Province: DKI Jakarta
- Regency: Jakarta
- District: Cengkareng
- Postal code: 11740

Rawa Buaya is an administrative village in the Cengkareng district of Jakarta. It formed part of the particuliere landen or private estates of N.V. Landbouw Maatschappij Tan Tiang Po, a colonial company belonging to Luitenant der Chinezen Tan Tiang Po and his son, Tan Liok Tiauw, Landheeren (or landlords) of Batoe-Tjepper.

Rawa Buaya's postal code is 11740.

== See also ==
- Cengkareng
- List of administrative villages of Jakarta
