= Grogol railway station =

Railway station in West Jakarta, Indonesia

T02 Grogol Station Stasiun Grogol
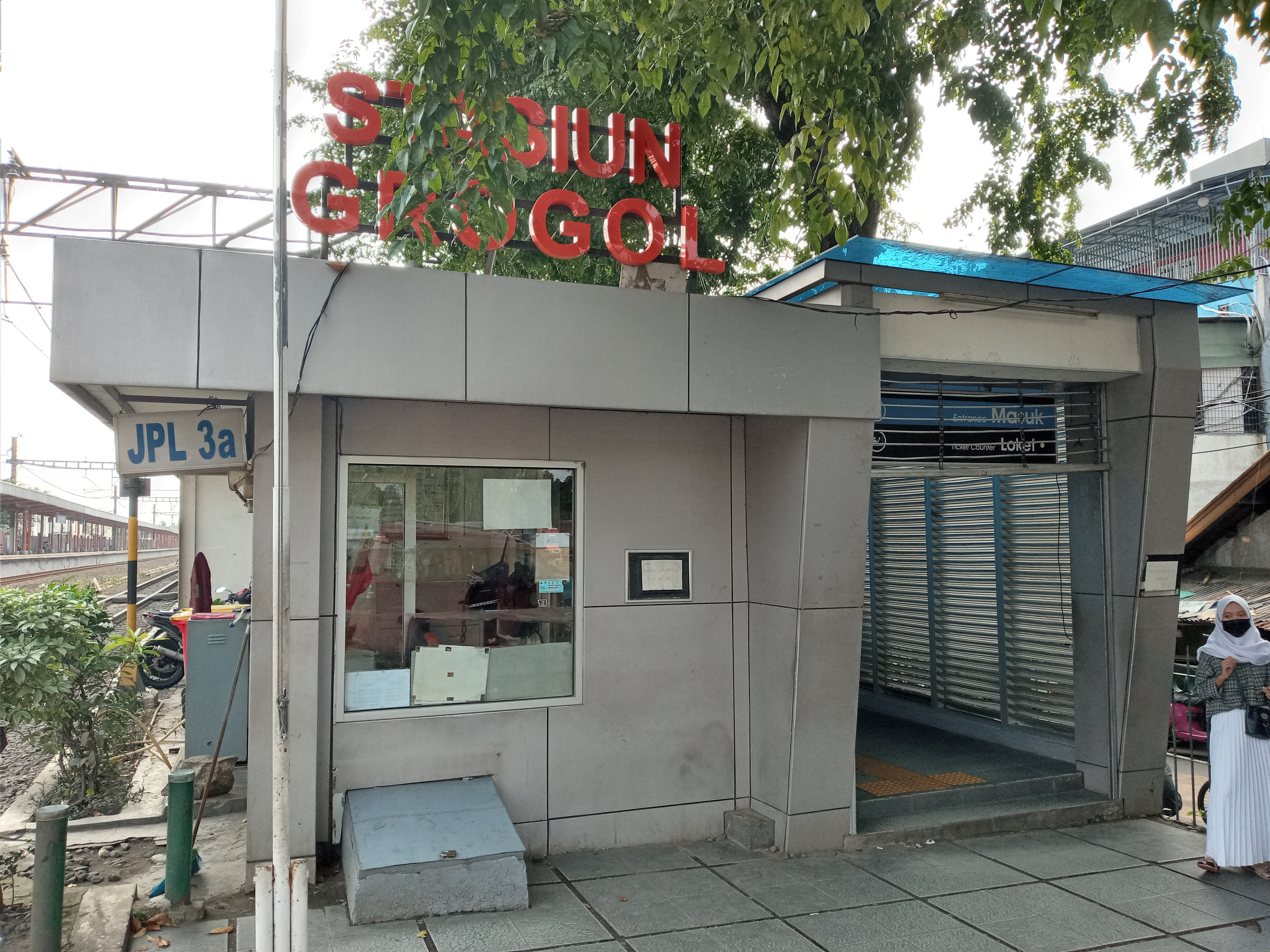
- Grogol station entrance, 2021

General information
- Location: Jl. Latumeten I, Jelambar, Grogol Petamburan, West Jakarta, 11460; Jakarta; Indonesia
- Coordinates: 6.162026699999999°S 106.7893716°E
- Elevation: +20 m (66 ft)
- Owner: Kereta Api Indonesia
- Operator: KAI Commuter
- Lines: Duri–Tangerang railway; Tangerang Line
- Platforms: 2 side platforms
- Tracks: 2
- Connections: Kali Grogol

Construction
- Accessible: Available

Other information
- Station code: GRG

History
- Opened: 16 June 2015 (reopened)

Services
Preceding station		Following station
Duri Terminus	Tangerang Commuter Line	Pesing towards Tangerang
Soekarno–Hatta Airport Commuter Line does not stop here
Location
- Location within Jakarta

Grogol Station (GRG) (Indonesian: Stasiun Grogol) is a railway station in Jelambar, Grogol Petamburan, West Jakarta. It is the second station on the Duri-Tangerang branch line Brown Line service. The station is a strategic point for students as it is located within close proximity of Trisakti University and the University of Tarumanegara.

On 16 June 2015, this station was reactivated, along with Taman Kota and Tanah Tinggi stations, after it was originally planned to operate on 28 May 2015. Before the reactivation, the station which used to serve the Tangerang DMU (KRD) train line only was inactive along with the construction of the Duri–Tangerang double-track.

== Building and layout ==
This station has two railway tracks, where both of them are straight tracks.

T02 Grogol
G	Main building	
Platform floor	Side platform, the doors are opened on the right side	
Platform floor	Line 1	← (Pesing) Tangerang Line to Tangerang
Platform floor	Line 2	Tangerang Line to Duri (Duri) →
Platform floor	Side platform, the doors are opened on the right side	

== Services ==
=== Passenger services ===
- KAI Commuter
  - Tangerang Line, to Duri and Tangerang

== Supporting transportation ==
Type	Station	Route	Destination
TransJakarta	Kali Grogol	List of TransJakarta corridors#Corridor 9	Pinang Ranti–Pluit
TransJakarta	N/A	9F (non-BRT)	Rusun Tambora–Pluit
TransJakarta	N/A	JAK-4 (Mikrotrans Jak Lingko)	Grogol Bus Terminal–Jelambar Baru
Mikrolet	N/A	M25	Tanah Abang Station–Jakarta Kota Station
Mikrolet	N/A	M41	Pesing Station–Tambora
Angkot	N/A	B01	Grogol Bus Terminal–Muara Angke Bus Terminal

== Gallery ==
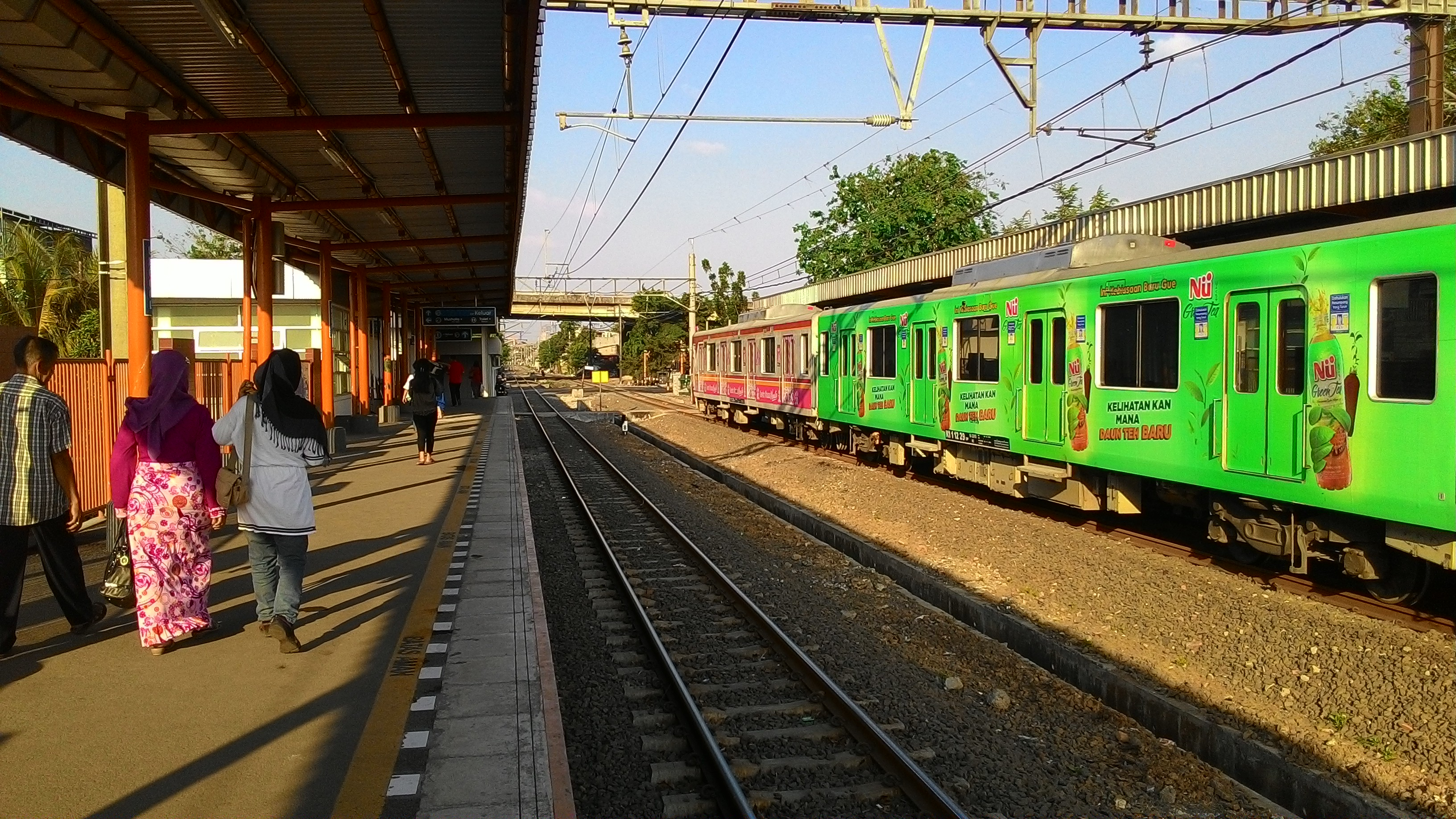
The platform of the station (2015)

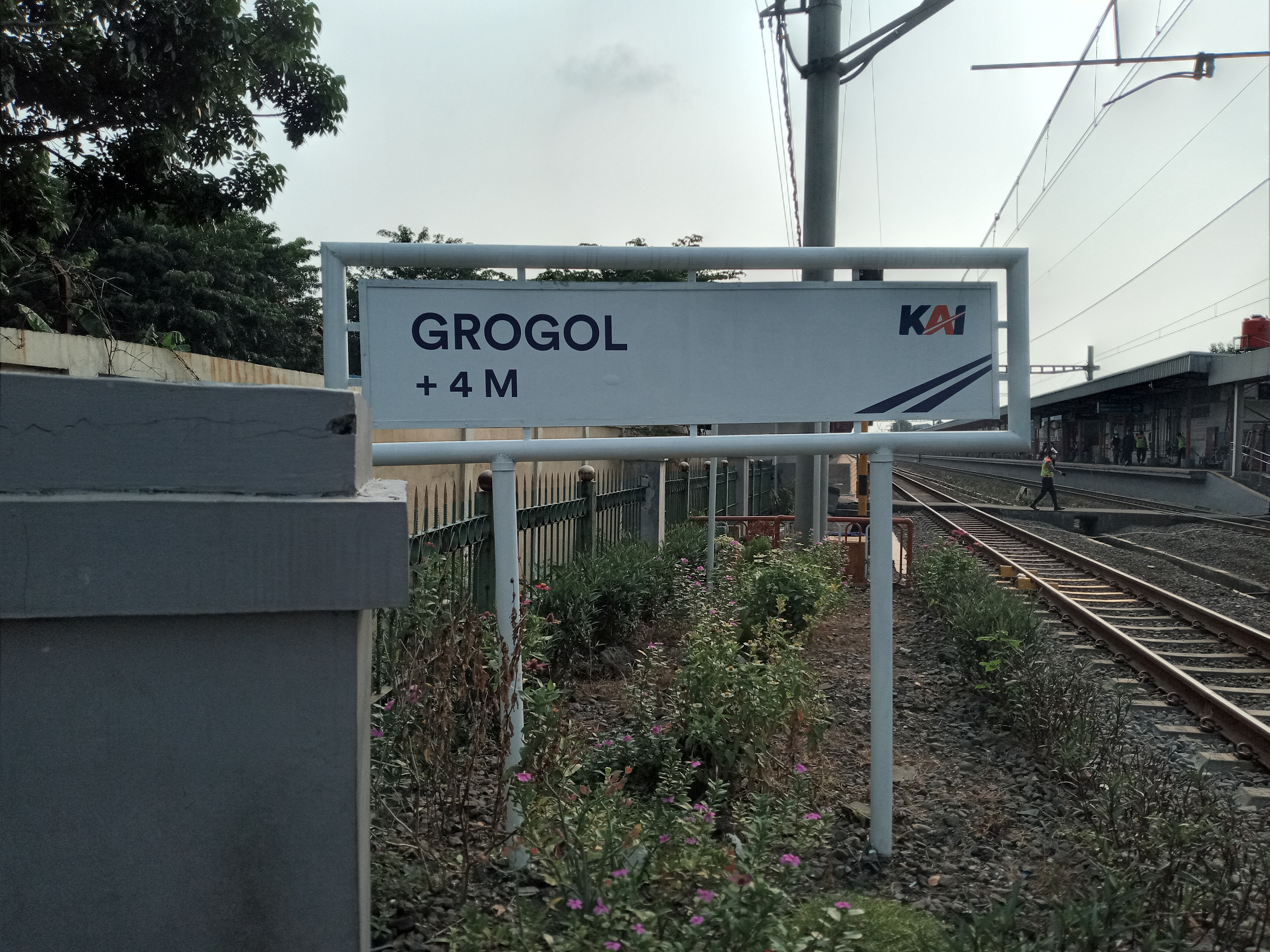
The signage of the station (2021)

Preceding station	Kereta Api Indonesia	Following station
Pesing towards Tangerang	Tangerang–Duri	Duri; Terminus
