= Tegal Alur =

- Administrative village
- Interactive map of Tegal Alur
- Country: Indonesia
- Province: DKI Jakarta
- Regency: Jakarta
- Subdistrict: Kalideres
- Postal code: 11820

Tegal Alur is an administrative village in the Kalideres district of Indonesia. It has postal code of 11820.

== See also ==
- Kalideres
- List of administrative villages of Jakarta
