= Tan Liok Tiauw =

Colonial Indonesian landowner

Tan Liok Tiauw Sia
- Born: 1872; Tangerang, Dutch East Indies
- Died: 1947 (aged 74–75); Batavia, Dutch East Indies
- Occupation(s): Landheer, plantation owner, industrialist
- Years active: 1890s-1940s
- Children: Corry Tan Pouw Nio (daughter); August Tan Tsjiang Kie (son); Jan Tan Tsjiang Bie (son)
- Parents: Tan Tiang Po, Luitenant der Chinezen (father); Lim Hong Nio (mother)
- Family: Loa Sek Hie (son-in-law); Khouw Yauw Kie, Kapitein der Chinezen (brother-in-law); Tan Eng Goan, Majoor der Chinezen (great-grandfather)

Tan Liok Tiauw Sia (1872 - 1947) was a prominent Chinese-Indonesian landowner, planter and industrial pioneer in the late colonial period, best known today as the last Landheer (or landlord) of Batoe-Tjepper, now the district of Batuceper.

== History ==
=== Family background ===
Born in Tangerang, Dutch East Indies in 1872, Tan hailed from a family of landlords and Chinese officers, part of the 'Cabang Atas' or the Chinese gentry of colonial Indonesia. The Chinese officership was a high-ranking government position in the civil bureaucracy of the Dutch East Indies, consisting of the ranks of Majoor, Kapitein and Luitenant der Chinezen.

His father, Tan Tiang Po, served as Luitenant der Chinezen in Tangerang from 1877 until 1885, while his grandfather, Luitenant Tan Kang Soey, sat on the Chinese Council (Dutch: 'Chinese Raad'; Hokkien: 'Kong Koan') of Batavia or modern-day Jakarta, capital of Indonesia. Tan's paternal great-grandfather was the tycoon Tan Leng (died in 1852), who was part of the powerful Ngo Ho Tjiang opium partnership. Through his mother, Lim Hong Nio, Tan was a grandson of Lim Soe Keng Sia and Tan Bit Nio, as well as a great-grandson of Tan Eng Goan, the first Majoor der Chinezen of Batavia (1802-1872). As a descendant of Chinese officers, Tan Liok Tiauw held the hereditary title of Sia from birth.

Tan's sister, Tan Him Nio, was married to Khouw Yauw Kie, Kapitein der Chinezen (died in 1908). His daughter, Corry Tan Pouw Nio (1900-1961), was married in November 1917 to the prominent, half-Austrian, colonial politician Loa Sek Hie (1898-1965). He also had two sons born to two different concubines: August Tan Tsjiang Kie and Jan Tan Tsjiang Bie.

=== Life ===
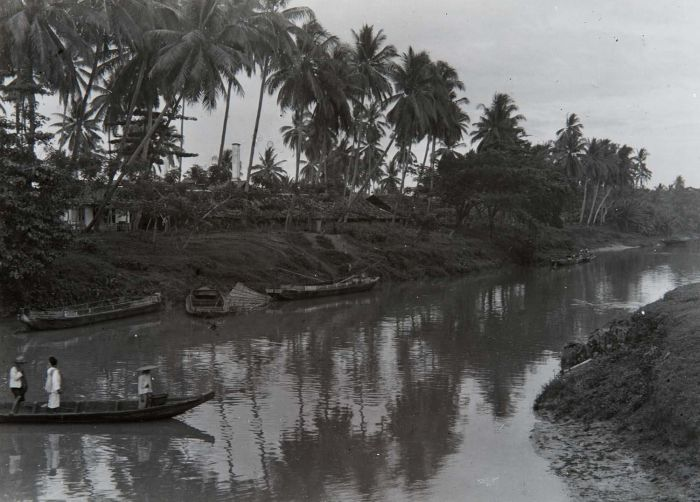
Tan Liok Tiauw's rooftile factory from across the Mookervaart canal, G.F.J. Bley (1925-30)

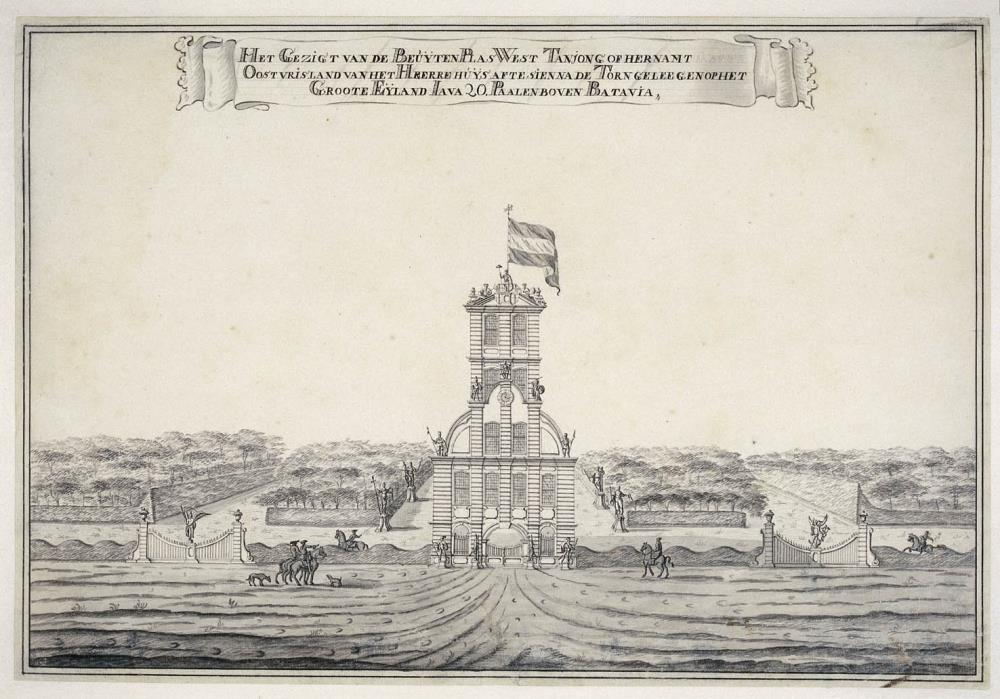
Gateway to Tandjong West in the 18th century

Tan grew up between his family's townhouse in downtown Batavia and their principal private domain, the particuliere landerij of Batoe-Tjepper, an agricultural estate in Tangerang. He was given a traditional Chinese education, but also had a private Dutch tutor.

Tan's father, Luitenant Tan Tiang Po, retired from his role as Landheer in the late 1880s, and handed over the management of Batoe-Tjepper to his son. Aged only 16, Tan Liok Tiauw not only improved the running of Batoe-Tjepper, but further developed an existing factory on the estate that manufactured building materials, roof-tiles and other terracotta products. Many important colonial buildings in Java, in particular in Batavia, were built using materials from the factory. In July 1923, Tan hosted Dirk Fock, the 30th Governor-General of the Dutch East Indies at Batoe-Tjepper as part of the latter's official visit to Tangerang.

Tan inherited other agricultural landholdings from his father on the latter's death in 1912. Many of these estates were consolidated in the landholding firm N.V. Landbouw Maatschappij Tan Tiang Po, which was incorporated in 1899. The company controlled the private domains of Rawa Buaya, Tanah Kodja, Pondok Kosambi, Minggoe Djawa and Kapoek, stretching from the western part of modern-day Jakarta to Tangerang. A wide range of agricultural crops were cultivated on these landholdings: ranging from rice, coconut, other fruits and vegetables, and on to grass for animal feed.

Tan acquired a number of other business ventures. Together with the philanthropist O. G. Khouw (his brother-in-law's cousin) and D. N. van Stralendorff, he took over the tea and rubber estates of Tendjo Ayoe and Perbakti in the Preanger highlands in 1907. These plantations were among the largest privately owned estates in Sukabumi, and had been established in the 1870s by the tea pioneer B. B. J. Crone, an uncle of the Indo-Dutch writer E. du Perron.

As Director, Tan Liok Tiauw also headed N. V. Landbouw Maatschappij Tandjong West, a syndicate of landlords which purchased the old, eighteenth-century ‘particuliere land’ or estate of Tandjong West in 1917, today part of Jagakarsa in South Jakarta. Beyond Java, Tan acquired Hacienda del Coco in Lampung on the southern tip of Sumatra, a formerly struggling British-owned plantation, founded by The Lampong Coconut Estates, Ltd. These Sumatran estates grew coconut and pepper, and — like many of Tan's other landholdings — were run by professional European estate managers.

Tan died in 1947 in Batavia, was buried at his family's private burial grounds at Kebon Besar in Batoe-Tjepper, Tangerang.
