= Tan Tiang Po =

Colonial Indonesian government official

Tan Tiang Po, Luitenant der Chinezen
- Born: 1846; Batavia, Dutch East Indies
- Died: 1912 (aged 65–66); Batavia, Dutch East Indies
- Occupations: Luitenant der Chinezen, Landheer
- Spouse: Lim Hong Nio
- Children: Tan Him Nio (daughter); Tan Liok Tiauw (son)
- Parents: Tan Kang Soeij, Luitenant der Chinezen (father); Tjie Tjan Nio (mother)
- Family: Lim Soe Keng Sia (father-in-law); Khouw Yauw Kie, Kapitein der Chinezen (son-in-law); Tan Eng Goan, Majoor der Chinezen (grandfather-in-law); Loa Sek Hie (grandson-in-law)

Tan Tiang Po, Lieutenant der Chinezen (1846–1912), also spelled Tan Tjeng Po, was a colonial Chinese-Indonesian bureaucrat, landowner, philanthropist and the penultimate Landheer (landlord) of the domain (particuliere land) of Batoe-Tjepper in the Dutch East Indies.

== Background and family ==
Born in 1846 in Batavia (now Jakarta), Tan hailed from the 'Cabang Atas' or the Chinese gentry of colonial Indonesia on both sides of his family. His father, the magnate Tan Kang Soeij (1827 – 1867), served as Luitenant der Chinezen of Weltevreden and sat on the Chinese Council (Kong Koan) of Batavia from 1860 to 1866. The Chinese officership was a prestigious bureaucratic appointment in the Dutch colonial government with administrative authority over the colony's ethnic Chinese subjects. Through his father, Tan was a grandson of the tycoon and pachter (revenue farmer) Tan Leng (1801 – 1851), part of the powerful Ngo Ho Tjiang Kongsi. Tan was also a half-nephew and near contemporary of Tan Kang Ie, Luitenant der Chinezen of Bekasi (1847 – 1908). Through his mother, Tjie Tjan Nio, Tan was a grandson of the bureaucrat Tjie Kim Louw, Luitenant-Boedelmeester der Chinezen (1801 – 1883), who sat on the college van Boedelmeesters (board of state trustees) and acted as Secretary of the Chinese Council.

Around the mid-1860s at Batoe-Tjepper, Tan married Lim Hong Nio, daughter of the administrator of Ngo Ho Tjiang, Lim Soe Keng Sia and Tan Bit Nio. Tan's wife was a descendant of two of Java's most eminent Cabang Atas families as the granddaughter of Lim Ke Tjang, Kapitein der Chinezen of Tegal in Central Java, and of Tan Eng Goan, the 1st Majoor der Chineezen of Batavia.

The couple had two children, Tan Him Nio (1868 – 1949), who married the landowner Khouw Yauw Kie, Kapitein der Chinezen, and Tan Liok Tiauw (1872 – 1947), who succeeded his father as the last Landheer of Batoe-Tjepper. His granddaughter through his son, Tan Pouw Nio, was married to the colonial politician and community leader Loa Sek Hie.

== Education and career ==
Tan received a traditional, classical Chinese education from private tutors; unusually for the time, he also had a European tutor who taught him Dutch and gave him some western education. As the son and grandson of Chinese officers, he bore the hereditary title ‘Sia’.

Probably some years after his father's acquisition in 1862 of the particuliere land of Batoe-Tjepper in Tangerang, Tan Tiang Po Sia moved there as administrator of the estate. He is recorded as already holding that post in 1865, and continued to do so after his father's death in 1867 under the tenure of his widowed mother Tjie Tjan Nio, who inherited the domain from her husband.

As a landlord, Tan was well-regarded by the local community thanks to his extensive philanthropy. In 1870, he was named by the Java-Bode newspaper as a significant contributor to the Red Cross, while in 1874 he founded a school in Batoe-Tjepper to provide a free education for the poorer children of the inhabitants of his domain.

In 1877, Tan was elevated to the Chinese lieutenancy in Tangerang under the headship of Lim Tjong Hien, Kapitein der Chinezen of Tangerang. Together with the whole officer corps of Tangerang in active service, Tan extended his patronage in 1878 to Boen Tek Bio, the oldest Chinese temple in the region, and helped purchase the shrine's burial grounds. Tan served as Luitenant until 1885, when he requested and was granted an honourable discharge.

In 1899, he incorporated a landholding company, N. V. Landbouw Tan Tiang Po, which held the family's subsidiary domains of Rawa Boeaja, Tanah Kodja, Pondok Kosambi, Minggoe Djawa and later a significant erfpacht (leasehold) in Kapoek. Most of the latter leasehold had been part of the private domain of Tan's grandfather-in-law, Majoor Tan Eng Goan.

Tan Tiang Po, oud-Lieutenant der Chinezen and Landheer of Batoe-Tjepper died in Batavia in 1912. The colonial press noted that his remains were brought back by automobile for burial at Batoe-Tjepper. A significant part of Tan's landholdings now forms part of Jakarta's Soekarno-Hatta International Airport, while the elite suburb of Pantai Indah Kapuk occupies part of N. V. Landbouw Tan Tiang Po’s leasehold of Kapoek.
