= KH Hasyim Asy'ari Grand Mosque =

Mosque in Jakarta, Indonesia

- Front view of the mosque seen from the east

- Location in Indonesia

Religion
- Affiliation: Islam
- Branch/tradition: Sunni

Location
- Location: Jakarta, Indonesia
- Interactive map of KH Hasyim Asy'ari Grand Mosque

Architecture
- Architect: Adhi Moersid Adhi
- Type: Mosque
- Style: Betawi
- Established: 2017
- Construction cost: US$ 12.8 million

Specifications
- Interior area: 16,985 m^{2} (182,830 sq ft)
- Minaret: 5

KH Hasyim Asy'ari Grand Mosque is a mosque at Semanan, Kalideres, West Jakarta, Indonesia. The mosque is named after National Hero of Indonesia Hasyim Asy'ari, the founder of the Nahdlatul Ulama. The mosque was inaugurated by Joko Widodo, President of Indonesia on 15 April 2017. The mosque is the first which is fully operated by Jakarta city administration.

== History ==
Joko Widodo introduced the idea of building a city-owned grand mosque when he was governor of Jakarta in 2012. Later, Ahok inaugurated the construction of the mosque in June 2013. It was built at a cost of US$12.8 million and inaugurated on 15 April 2017.

== Design and facilities ==
The mosque is designed with Betawi ornament nuances with the concept of five minarets that symbolize the pillars of Islam. The mosque adopted the concept of a typical Betawi bapang house. With a triangular roof and tooth ornament balang. The shape of the building forms the letter 'T', with a special central part of the place of worship. The mosque has two minarets in front, two on the right wing, and one on the left wing. The wings of the mosque are built for other facilities. In the center there is one big triangle and four small triangles on the front. The mosque compound has a large yard to agriculture farming.

Built on 2.4 hectares of land, the mosque can accommodate 12,500 people for prayer. The mosque has an office space, a function hall with a capacity of 1,000 people and a library.

== See also ==
- Kalideres
