= Semanan =

- Administrative village
- Interactive map of Semanan
- Coordinates: 6°11′S 106°42′E
- Country: Indonesia
- Province: DKI Jakarta
- Regency: Jakarta
- District: Kalideres

Area
  - Total: 5.36 km^{2} (2.07 sq mi)

Population (mid 2023 estimate)
  - Total: 94,020
  - Density: 17,500/km^{2} (45,400/sq mi)
- Postal code: 11850

Semanan is an administrative urban village (kelurahan) in the Kalideres district (kecamatan) of West Jakarta administrative city, in Indonesia. The kelurahan has the postal code of 11850. KH Hasyim Asy'ari Grand Mosque is located in this village.

In 2023, this kelurahan was inhabited by 94,020 residents consisting of 47,843 men and 46,177 women, with a sex ratio of 103.61.

== See also ==
- Kalideres
- List of administrative villages of Jakarta
