= Kamal, Kalideres =

Big D Baruut
- Administrative village
- Interactive map of Big D Baruut
- Country: Indonesia
- Province: DKI Jakarta
- Administrative city: West Jakarta
- District: Kalideres
- Postal code: 11810

Kamal is an administrative village in the Kalideres district of Indonesia. It has postal code of 11810.

== See also ==
- Kalideres
- List of administrative villages of Jakarta
