= Taman Kota railway station =

Railway station in Indonesia

T04 Taman Kota Station Stasiun Taman Kota
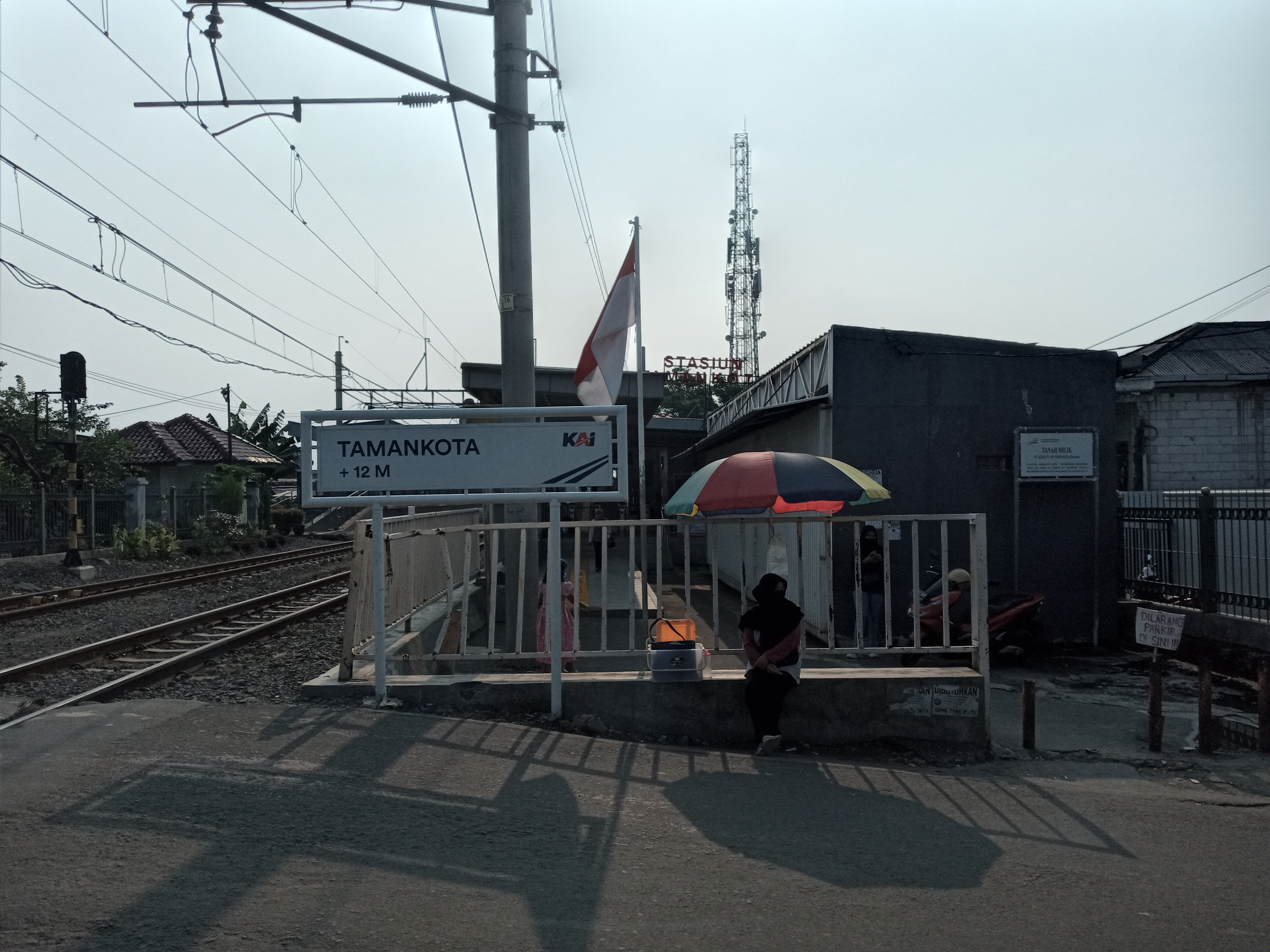
- Station entrance

General information
- Location: North Kembangan, Kembangan, West Jakarta; Jakarta; Indonesia
- Coordinates: 6.158651°S 106.75651°E
- Elevation: +12 m (39 ft)
- Owner: Kereta Api Indonesia
- Operator: KAI Commuter
- Lines: Duri–Tangerang railway; Tangerang Line
- Platforms: 2 side platforms
- Tracks: 2

Construction
- Structure type: Ground
- Parking: Available
- Accessible: Yes

Other information
- Station code: TKO
- Classification: Class III

History
- Opened: 1899; Reopened 28 May 2015 (trial); 16 June 2015 (full operational)
- Electrified: 1997
- Former names: Kembangan Station

Services
Preceding station		Following station
Pesing towards Duri	Tangerang Commuter Line	Bojong Indah towards Tangerang
Soekarno–Hatta Airport Commuter Line does not stop here
Location
- Location within Jakarta

Taman Kota Station (TKO, formerly Kembangan Station) is a class III railway station located in North Kembangan, Kembangan, West Jakarta. The station, which is located at an altitude of +12 meters, is included in the Jakarta Operational Area I and only serves the KRL Commuterline route.

== History ==
On 16 June 2015, this station was inaugurated together with Grogol Station and Tanah Tinggi Station, having previously planned to operate on 28 May 2015. However, the residents had opposed the station project due to disruption of access to residents.

Since 1 August 2019, this station, along with Sudirman, Palmerah, Cikini, and Universitas Indonesia stations, has officially ceased the sale of single-trip cards (Guaranteed Daily Tickets (Indonesian: Tiket Harian Berjaminan) or THB) for KRL Commuterline services. This is because the majority of KRL Commuterline passengers are used to using multi-trip cards and electronic money. In this way, long queues to buy KRL tickets can be cut. However, service users can still tap-in/tap-out with THB cards at this station.

== Building and layout ==
This station has two railway tracks, where both of them are straight tracks.

T04 Taman Kota
G	Main building	
Platform floor	Side platform, the doors are opened on the right side	
Platform floor	Line 1	← (Bojong Indah) Tangerang Line to Tangerang
Platform floor	Line 2	Tangerang Line to Duri (Pesing) →
Platform floor	Side platform, the doors are opened on the right side	

== Services ==
The following is a list of train services at the Taman Kota Station.

=== Passenger services ===
- KAI Commuter
  - Tangerang Line, to Duri and Tangerang

== Intermodal support ==
Public transport type	Station	Line	Destination
TransJakarta	Taman Kota	List of Transjakarta corridors#Cross-corridor routes	Pulo Gadung - Rawa Buaya
TransJakarta	Taman Kota	List of Transjakarta corridors#Corridor 3	Kalideres - Monas
TransJakarta	Taman Kota		Kalideres - Gelora Bung Karno
TransJakarta	N/A	3D (non-BRT)	Penjaringan - Taman Kota via Tubagus Angke
TransJakarta	N/A	JAK 51 (non-BRT; Mikrotrans Jak Lingko)	Taman Kota Station - North Petukangan
Kopaja	N/A	B87	Kalideres Terminal-Penjaringan
Kopaja	N/A	B88	Kalideres Terminal-Slipi
Kopaja	N/A	B93	Kalideres Terminal-Tanah Abang Station
Kopaja	N/A	B95	Mal Taman Anggrek-Benda
Mayasari Bakti	N/A	AC02	Kalideres Terminal–Kampung Rambutan Terminal
Mayasari Bakti	N/A	AC29 (Transjabodetabek)	Bekasi Terminal-Kalideres Terminal (via West Bekasi)
Mayasari Bakti	N/A	AC42A (Transjabodetabek)	Cileungsi Terminal-Kalideres Terminal
Mayasari Bakti	N/A	AC125 (Transjabodetabek)	Cikarang Terminal-Kalideres Terminal

== Gallery ==
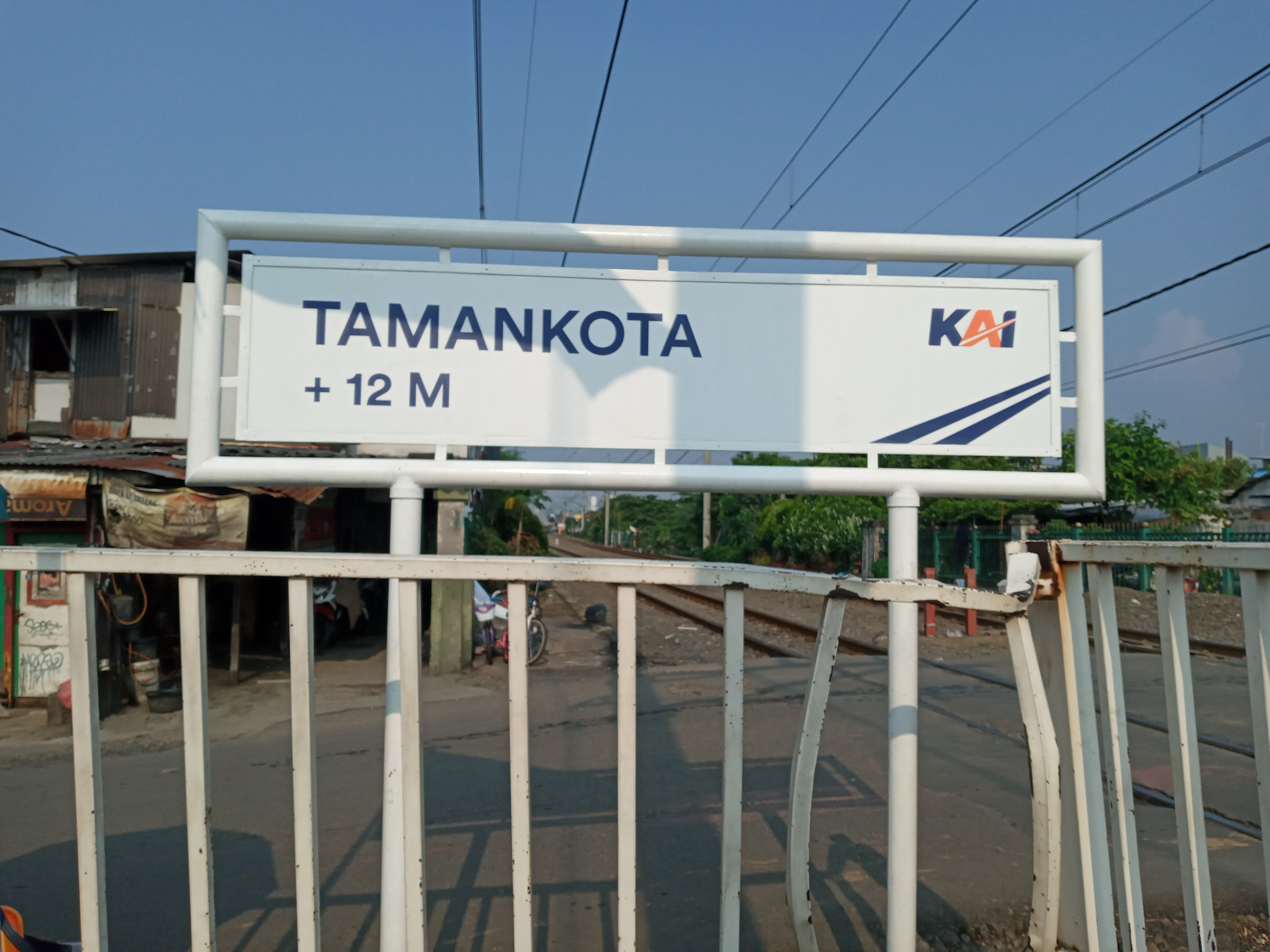
The signage of the station as of 2021

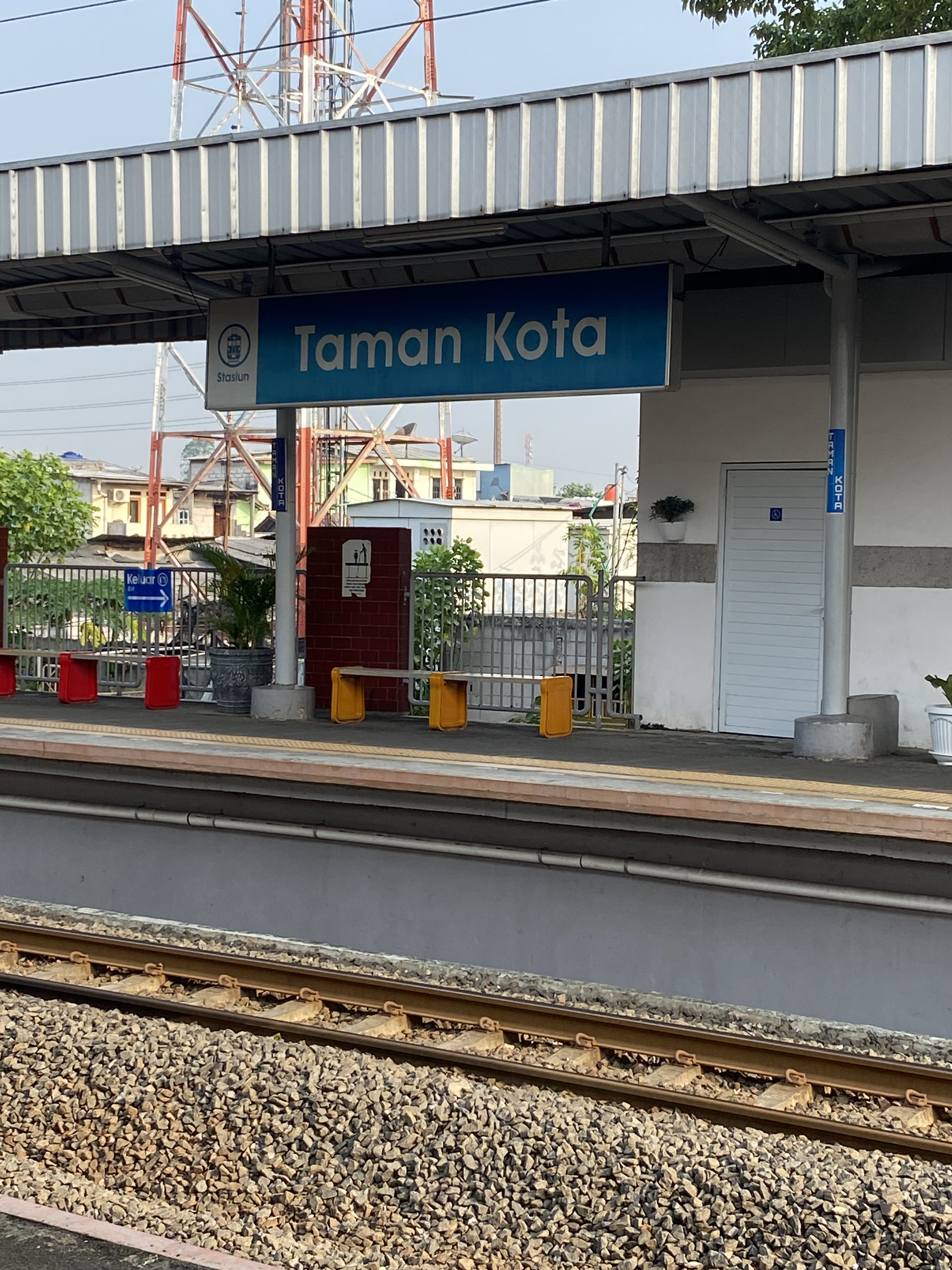
Platform 1

Preceding station	Kereta Api Indonesia	Following station
Pesing towards Duri	Duri–Tangerang	Bojong Indah towards Tangerang
