= Pesing railway station =

Railway station in Indonesia

T03 Pesing Station Stasiun Pesing
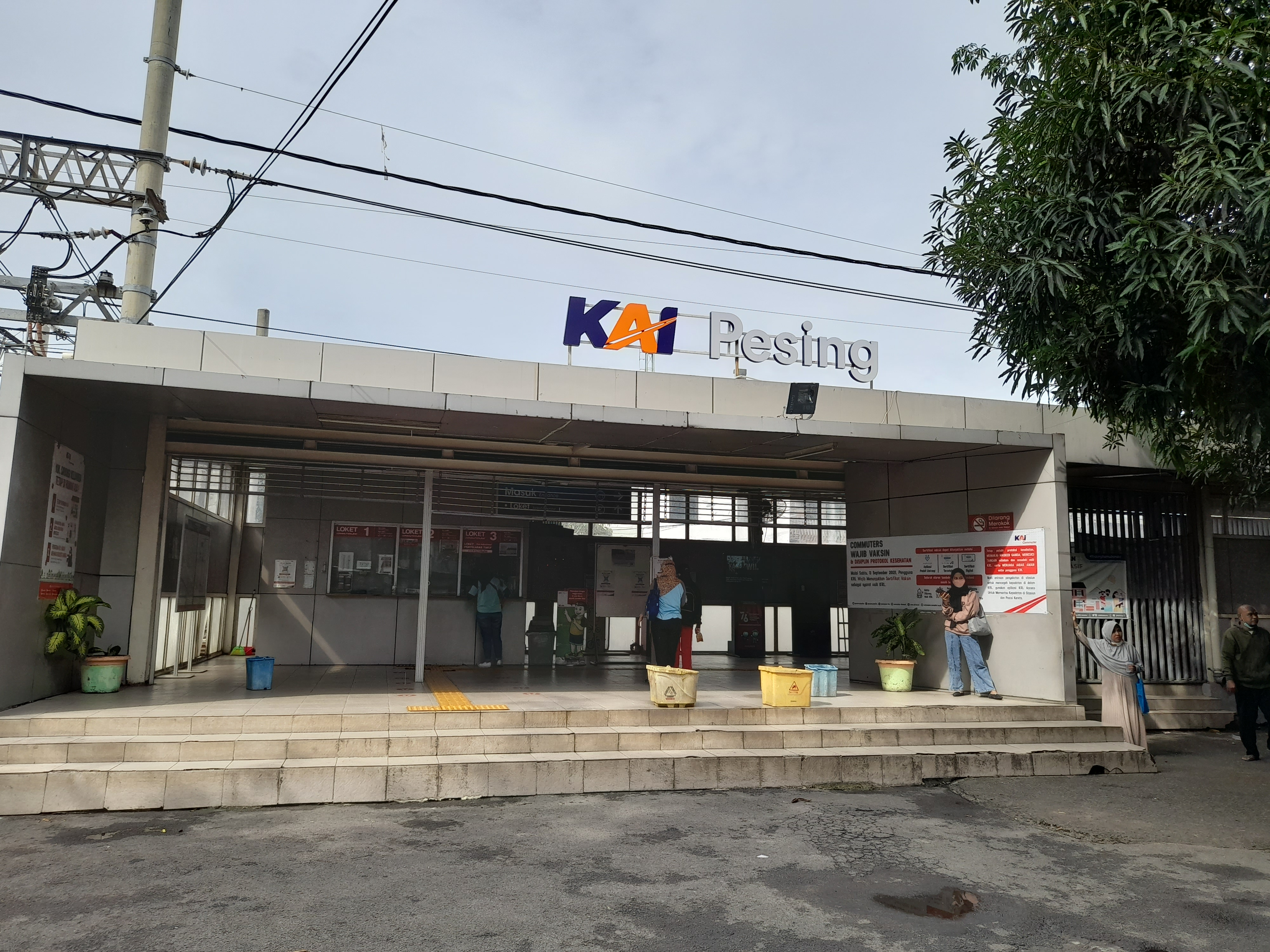
- Pesing Station, photo was taken on 5 December 2021.

General information
- Location: Jl. Daan Mogot, Wijaya Kusuma, Grogol Petamburan, West Jakarta; Jakarta; Indonesia
- Coordinates: 6.1612656999999995°S 106.77146669999999°E
- Elevation: +5 m (16 ft)
- Owner: Kereta Api Indonesia
- Operator: KAI Commuter
- Lines: Duri–Tangerang railway; Tangerang Line
- Platforms: 2 side platforms
- Tracks: 2

Construction
- Structure type: Ground
- Parking: Unavailable
- Accessible: Yes

Other information
- Station code: PSG
- Classification: Class III

History
- Opened: 1899

Services
Preceding station		Following station
Grogol towards Duri	Tangerang Commuter Line	Taman Kota towards Tangerang
Soekarno–Hatta Airport Commuter Line does not stop here
Location
- Location within Jakarta

Pesing Station (PSG) is a railway station in Wijaya Kusuma, Grogol Petamburan, West Jakarta, Indonesia. It is the third station on the Duri-Tangerang branch line and KRL Commuterline Brown Line service. The station is near to the office and studios of the television broadcasting company Indosiar.

== Building and layout ==
Initially this station had 2 train lines with line 1 being a straight line in both directions, this station also used to have money orders. However, since the Brown Line became a double track, the switchboard was dismantled, then line 1 was made a straight line towards Duri, while line 2 was made a straight track towards Tangerang.

T03 Pesing
Platform floor	Side platform, the doors are opened on the right side	
Platform floor	Line 2	← (Taman Kota) Tangerang Line to Tangerang
Platform floor	Line 1	Tangerang Line to Duri (Grogol) →
Platform floor	Side platform, the doors are opened on the right side	
G	Main building	

== Services ==
The following is a list of train services at the Pesing Station.

=== Passenger services ===
- KAI Commuter
  - Tangerang Line, to Duri and Tangerang

== Intermodal support ==
Public transport type	Line	Destination
Transjakarta	List of Transjakarta corridors#Cross-corridor routes	Pulo Gadung - Rawa Buaya (transfer at Damai Halt)
Transjakarta	List of Transjakarta corridors#Corridor 3	Kalideres - Monas (transfer at Damai Halt)
Transjakarta		Kalideres - Senayan Bank Jakarta (transfer at Damai Halt)
Transjakarta	List of TransJakarta corridors#Corridor 8	Lebak Bulus - Pasar Baru (transfer at Damai Halt)
Mayasari Bakti	AC02	Kalideres Terminal-Kampung Rambutan Terminal
Mayasari Bakti	AC29	Kalideres Terminal-Bekasi Terminal
Mayasari Bakti	AC42A	Kalideres Terminal-Cileungsi Terminal
Mayasari Bakti	Trans Jabodetabek	Kalideres Terminal-Cikarang Terminal

== Incidents ==
- On 10 March 2016, a fire occurred in a densely populated settlement in the Pesing area. The railroad track at Pesing Station was packed with people who were busy putting out the fire. As a result, all Tangerang-Duri KRL trips were disrupted.
- On 3 June 2016, a KRL broke down at Pesing Station. As a result, the entire KRL carriage became pitch black for fifteen minutes until it finally came back to normal. KRL trips were disrupted when the KRL broke down.
- On 22 September 2017, there was a breakdown on one of the KRL circuits at Pesing Station. As a result, KRL trips on the Tangerang-Duri route were disrupted. Later, the KRL had to be taken to the Bukit Duri KRL depot to undergo repairs.

Preceding station	Kereta Api Indonesia	Following station
Taman Kota towards Tangerang	Tangerang–Duri	Grogol towards Duri
