= Angke River =

River in Jakarta, Indonesia

Angke River Cikeumeuh
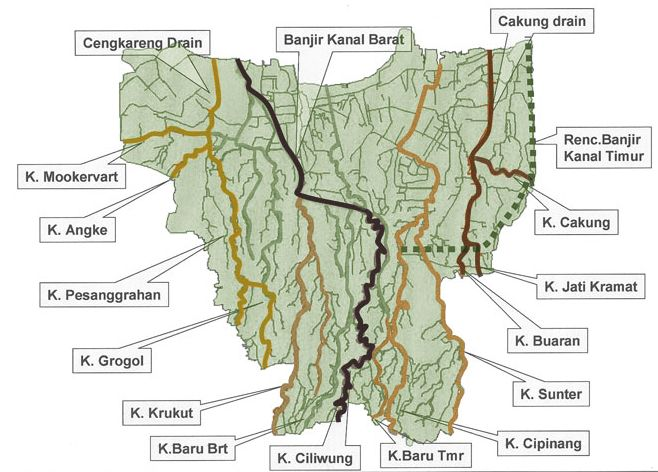
- Angke River ("K. Angke"), upper left in the map of rivers and canals of Jakarta (2012)
- Native name: Sungai Angke (Indonesian); Ci Angke (Sundanese); Kali Angke (Betawi)

Location
- Country: Indonesia
- State: Jakarta

Physical characteristics
- Source
  - location: Bogor
- Mouth: Cengkareng Drain, Java Sea
  - coordinates: 6°07′28″S 106°46′29″E
  - elevation: 1 m (3 ft 3 in)
- Length: 91.25 km (56.70 mi)

Basin features
- Tributaries
  - left: Maja River

The Angke River (Indonesian: Sungai Angke; Sundanese: Ci Angke; Betawi: Kali Angke; Chinese: 紅溪; pinyin: Hóng xī; Pe̍h-ōe-jī: Âng-khe) is a 91.25-kilometre (56.70 mi) long river in Jakarta, Indonesia. The river flows from the Bogor area of West Java, passing through the cities of Tangerang (Banten) and Jakarta into the Java Sea via the Cengkareng Drain. The river is connected with the Cisadane River by the Mookervaart Canal.

== Etymology ==
The river may be named after Prince Tubagus Angke, from the Banten Sultanate, who was the ruler of Jayakarta in the 16th century. Another theory is that the name refers to the 1740 Batavia massacre in which 10,000 ethnic Chinese residents of the city were massacred by the Dutch East India Company with many bodies dumped in the river. Ang means "red" in Hokkien, which could refer to the bloody event.

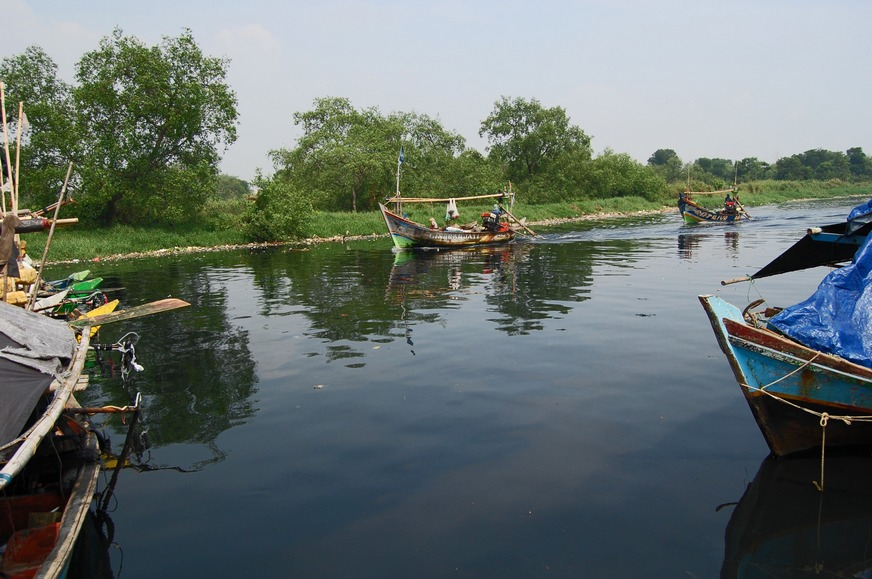
The river at Muara Angke (2007)

== Hydrology ==
The main river has a length of 91.25 kilometres (56.70 mi), with a watershed area (Indonesian: Daerah Pengaliran Sungai) of 480 km^{2}. The average daily rainfall is 132 mm, with the peak debit at 290 m^{3}. The river never dries throughout the year, because it connects directly to a constant source at the districts of Menteng and Cilendek Timur in the city of Bogor, West Java. From there it flows through the territory of South Tangerang, Tangerang, Jakarta, and drains to the Java Sea in the village of Muara Angke (literally: "(river) mouth of Angke"), Penjaringan, West Jakarta. In rainy seasons, the river annually causes local floods, usually in the districts of Pinang, Cipondoh, Ciledug (all in Tangerang), Joglo, Kembangan, Rawa Buaya, Duri Kosambi and Cengkareng (all in West Jakarta).

== Geography ==
The river flows in the northwest area of Java with a predominantly tropical rainforest climate (designated as Af in the Köppen-Geiger climate classification). The annual average temperature in the area is 27 °C. The warmest month is March, when the average temperature is around 30 °C, and the coldest is May, at 26 °C. The average annual rainfall is 3674 mm. The wettest month is December, with an average of 456 mm of rainfall, and the driest is September, with 87 mm of rainfall.

== Historic place ==
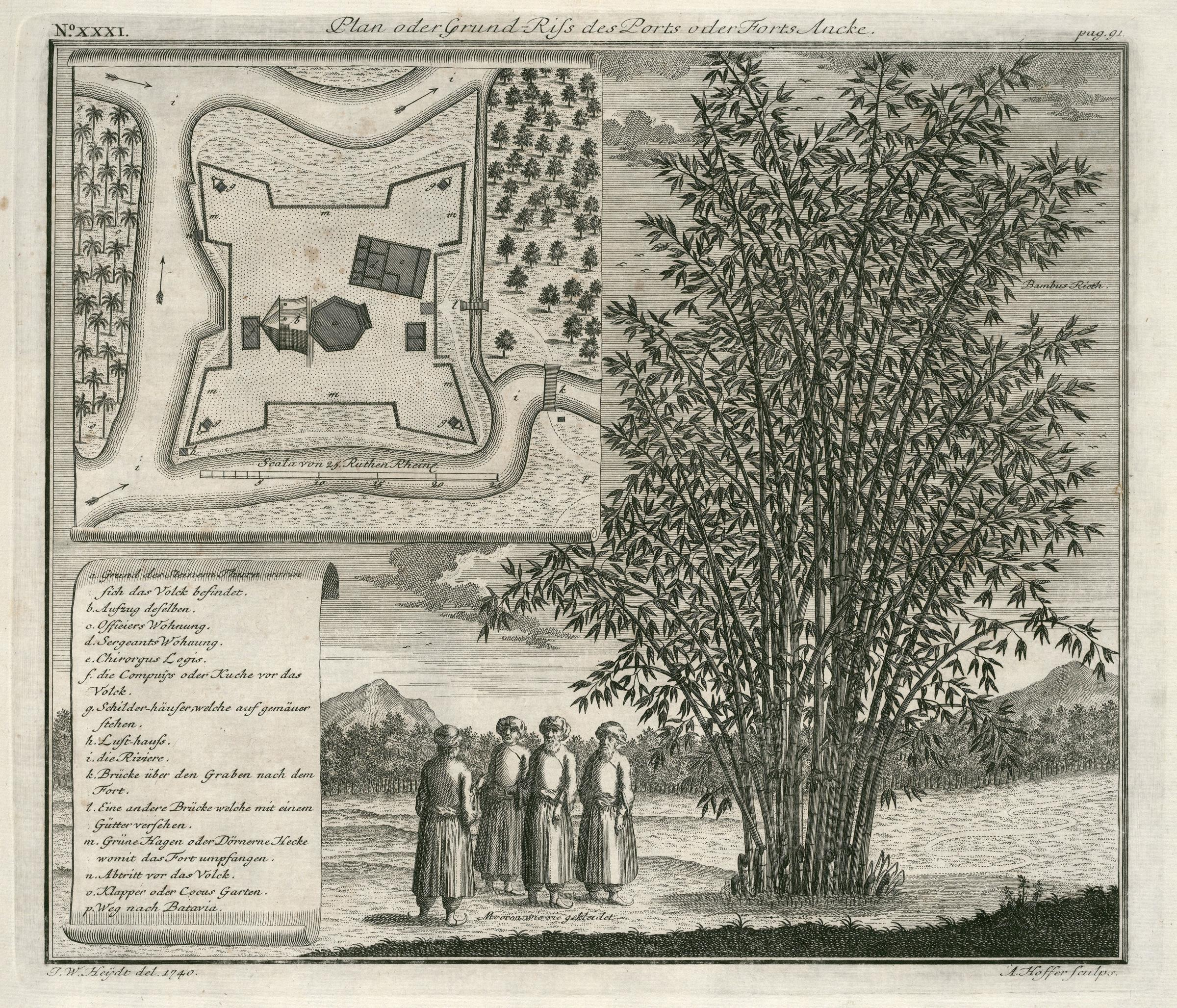
Map of Fort Anké

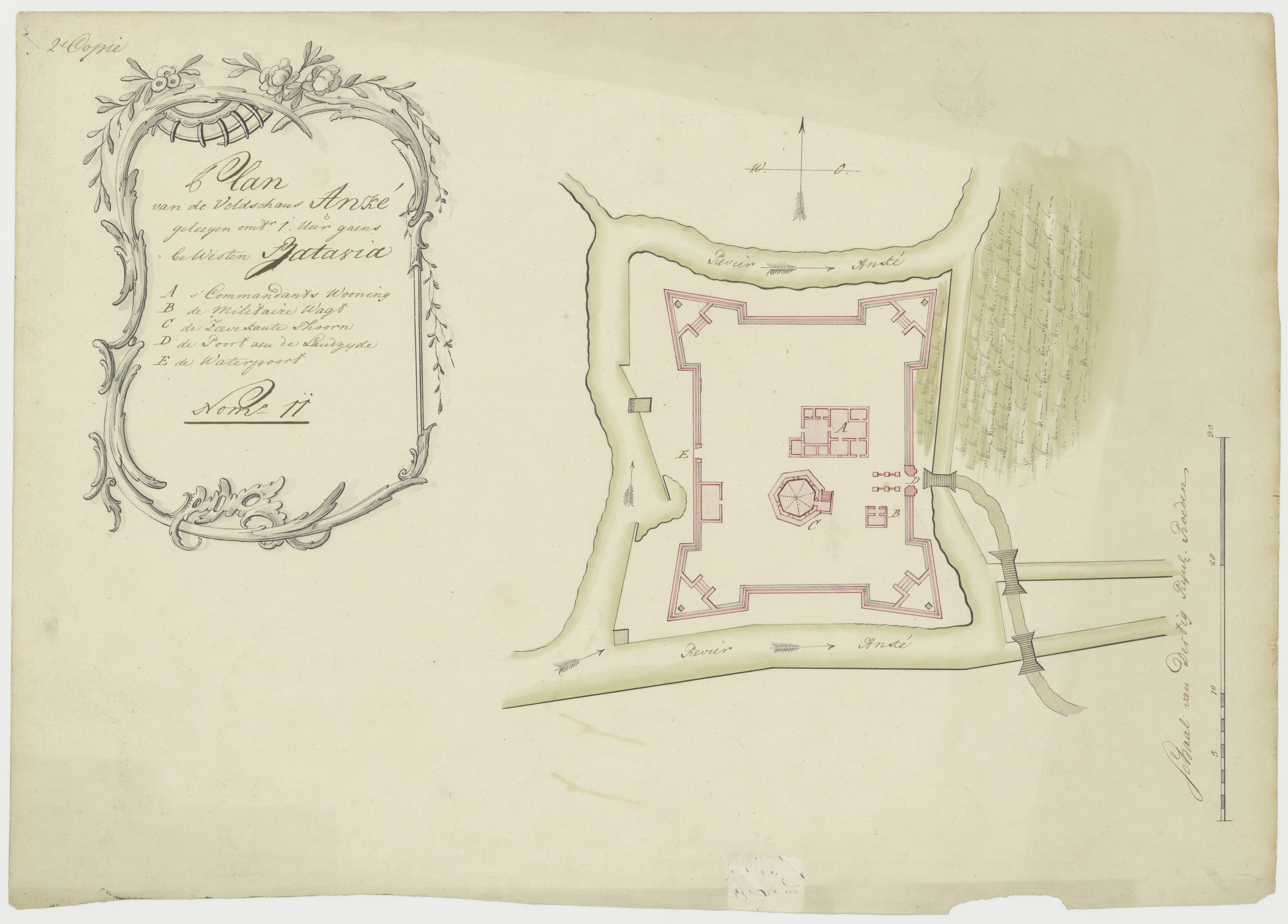
Map of the Anké entrenchment

Fort Anké was built by the Dutch East India Company in 1657 at the intersection of the Mookervaart channel and Angke River. Historical names for the fort include Anckee, Anke, and Ankee.

== See also ==
- List of rivers of Java
- List of drainage basins of Indonesia
