= Kalideres, Kalideres =

Kalideres
- Administrative village
- Location within Indonesia
- Coordinates: 6.154444°S 106.694722°E
- Country: Indonesia
- Province: DKI Jakarta
- Administrative city: West Jakarta
- District: Kalideres
- Postal code: 11840

Kalideres is an administrative village in the Kalideres district of Indonesia. Its postal code is 11840.

== See also ==
- Kalideres
- List of administrative villages of Jakarta
