= Pegadungan =

- Subdistrict
- Location within Jakarta
- Country: Indonesia
- Province: DKI Jakarta
- Regency: Jakarta
- District: Kalideres
- Postal code: 11830

Pegadungan is an administrative village in the Kalideres district of Indonesia. It is in the province of Jakarta. Its postal code is 11830.

== See also ==
- Kalideres
- List of administrative villages of Jakarta
