= Cengkareng Timur, Cengkareng =

Cengkareng Timur
- Subdistrict
- Kelurahan Cengkareng Timur
- Location within Jakarta Location within Java Location within Indonesia
- Country: Indonesia
- Province: DKI Jakarta
- Administrative city: West Jakarta
- District: Cengkareng
- Postal code: 11740

Cengkareng Timur is a subdistrict in the Cengkareng district of Jakarta. It has postal code of 11740.

== See also ==
- Cengkareng
- List of administrative villages of Jakarta
