= Cengkareng Barat, Cengkareng =

Cengkareng Barat
- Subdistrict
- Kelurahan Cengkareng Barat
- Location within Jakarta Location within Java Location within Indonesia
- Country: Indonesia
- Province: DKI Jakarta
- Administrative city: Jakarta
- District: Cengkareng
- Postal code: 11730

Cengkareng Barat is a subdistrict in the Cengkareng district of Jakarta. It has postal code of 11730.

== See also ==
- Cengkareng
- List of administrative villages of Jakarta
