= Fort Anké =

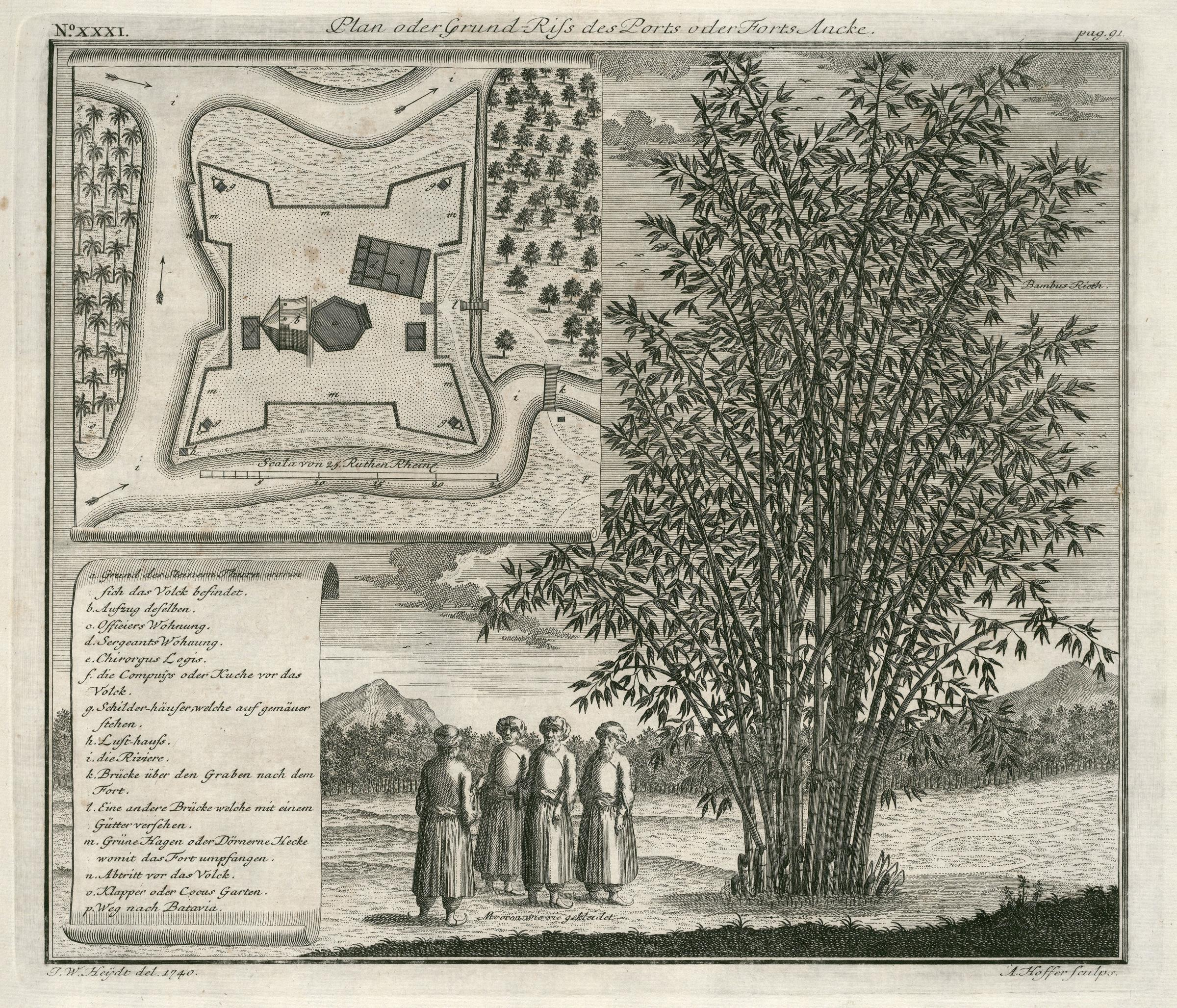
Map of Fort Anké

Fort Anké was a fort located in North Jakarta, Indonesia. It was built by the Dutch East India Company in 1657 along the river of the same name, to the west of the city of Jakarta. Historical names for the fort include Anckee, Anke, and Ankee.

Three officers of the French corsair Le Modeste were held as prisoners at the fort for five months, when French naturalist J.-J. La Billardière visited them in November 1796. The same text says the fort was located an hour from Batavia.

A Dutch map from 1740 shows the fort at the intersection of the Mookervaart channel and Angke river.

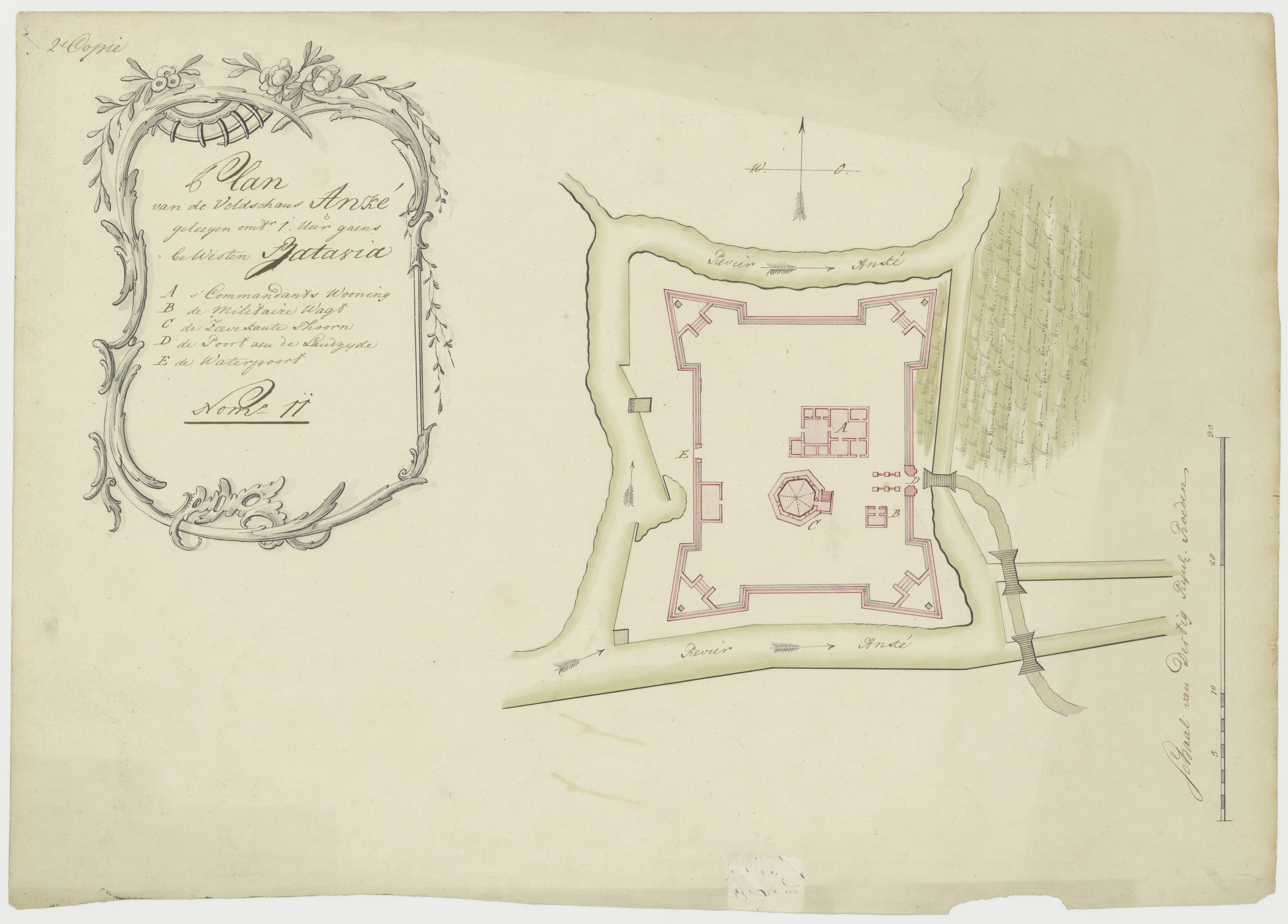
Map of the Anké entrenchment

== See also ==
- List of colonial buildings and structures in Jakarta
