= Jelambar =

- Administrative village
- Interactive map of Jelambar
- Country: Indonesia
- Province: Jakarta
- City: West Jakarta
- District: Grogol Petamburan

Jelambar is an administrative village (kelurahan) of Grogol Petamburan, West Jakarta, Indonesia.

== Location ==
This area is bounded by a few main roads, i.e. Daan Mogot St, Latumeten St, and Tubagus Angke St. The landmarks surrounding Jelambar are The Citraland Mall and Hotel Ciputra, Royal Taruma Hospital, and Indosiar TV Station. Jelambar could be accessed through Daan Mogot street, then take one of these streets : Hadiah street, Latumeten, Penerangan or Karya street. Jelambar covers up housing complexes such as Kavling Polri & Prima Indah. The density of Jelambar is second after Tambora.

== Transportation ==
Jelambar is served by the famous Bemo service. A Bemo is a unique three-wheel vehicle public transport that can carry 8 people including the driver. There are also bajais around Jelambar. A Bajai is also a three-wheel vehicle public transport, but the difference between a bemo is : a bajai is like a taxi, a private public transport, but at a lower cost, KRL towards Tangerang transfer in Grogol, and Transjakarta Corridor 3, 8, and 9 transfer in Jelambar and Latumeten Stasiun Grogol bus stop

== Education ==
Private schools in Jelambar area are Dharma Jaya, Bunda Hati Kudus, St. Kristoforus, Hati Kudus, Pelita Kudus, Imannuel, Pancaran Berkat & Galatia 2.

== Facilities ==
There are some churches, mosques, and temples spread on Jelambar.

Jelambar is also known by its variety of food stalls. Chinese food stalls are concentrated in Dutamas area. The famous Bakso (meatballs) Botak is located in Kavling Polri.

Furthermore, there are also several local bookstores, such as Bukupedia book store which is located in Kavling Polri.
