= Kedaung Kali Angke, Cengkareng =

Kedaung Kali Angke
- Subdistrict
- Interactive map of Kedaung Kali Angke
- Coordinates: 6°09′10″S 106°45′31″E
- Country: Indonesia
- Province: DKI Jakarta
- Administrative city: West Jakarta
- District: Cengkareng

Area
  - Total: 2.61 km^{2} (1.01 sq mi)
- Postal code: 11710

Kedaung Kali Angke is a subdistrict in the Cengkareng district of Indonesia. It has postal code of 11710. The administrative village's area is 2.61 km^{2} (1.01 sq mi).

== See also ==
- Cengkareng
- List of administrative villages of Jakarta
