= Kalideres =

District in West Jakarta, Indonesia

Coordinates: 6°8′45.64″S 106°42′39.45″E

- District
- Interactive map of Kalideres
- Country: Indonesia
- Province: Jakarta
- Administrative city: West Jakarta

Kalideres is an administrative district (kecamatan) of the administrative city of West Jakarta, Indonesia and is the westernmost district of Jakarta. Kalideres covers 2,897 hectares (7,160 acres) and is bounded by Tangerang Regency to the north, Penjaringan District (North Jakarta) to the northeast, Cengkareng District (West Jakarta) to the east and Tangerang City to the south and west. The area was initially a Dutch colonial plantation, with the name Kalideres emerging after the deepening of the Mookervaart River, which revitalized the region.

The district is currently divided into five administrative villages. As of 2022, Kalideres had an area of 30.23 km^{2} and a population of 464,923 (comprising 234,771 males and 230,152 females); giving a population density of 15,380 people per km^{2} (39,834 people per sq mi). The district is served by TransJakarta corridor 3, the KRL Jabodetabek Duri–Tangerang Line, and the Kalideres Bus Terminal.

== History ==
During its early days as a colonial plantation, the area was named Westevrede and later Burgvliet by Dutch landowners. Local residents likely began using the name Kalidras (an older spelling) after 1732, following the deepening of the Mookervaart River. This deepening created a strong current that transformed the area into a more vibrant and appealing location for both the Dutch and local inhabitants. The riverbanks were characterized by an abundance of cattle, wild palm forests, and diverse vegetation. The modern spelling, Kalideres, is believed to have emerged in the first half of the 20th century.

After Indonesia gained independence, Kalideres was initially part of Tangerang Regency, West Java. A significant administrative change occurred on December 28, 1974, with the issuance of Indonesian Government Regulation No. 45 of 1974. This regulation redefined the boundaries of the Special Capital Region of Jakarta, incorporating several administrative villages from bordering areas, including parts of Tangerang Regency, into Jakarta's Cengkareng District.

Further administrative restructuring of Jakarta's divisions took place on December 18, 1990, via Indonesian Government Regulation No. 60 of 1990. This established Kalideres as an independent district, separated from Cengkareng. It encompassed the administrative villages of Kamal, Tegal Alur, Pegadungan, Kalideres (bearing the same name as the district), and Semanan. The Kalideres administrative village was then designated as the district's administrative center.

== Kelurahan (administrative village) ==
Kalideres is sub-divided into five administrative villages (kelurahan), listed below with their areas and their populations as of 2022, together with their post codes.

Area code	Name of Kelurahan	Area in sq. km	Pop'n 2022	Post code
31.73.06.1001	Kalideres	5.71	93,314	11840
31.73.06.1002	Semanan	5.98	93,206	11850
31.73.06.1003	Tegal Alur	4.97	71,584	11820
31.73.06.1004	Kamal	4.90	98,348	11810
31.73.06.1005	Pegadungan	8.67	108,471	11830
31.73.06	Totals	30.23	464,923	

== Transportation ==
Kalideres is serviced by TransJakarta corridor 3 with its 2 stops (Kalideres and Pesakih) and KRL Jabodetabek's Duri–Tangerang Line serving Kalideres Station.

Kalideres Bus Terminal is also located in Kalideres.
