= Cengkareng =

District in Jakarta, Indonesia

- District
- Kecamatan Cengkareng
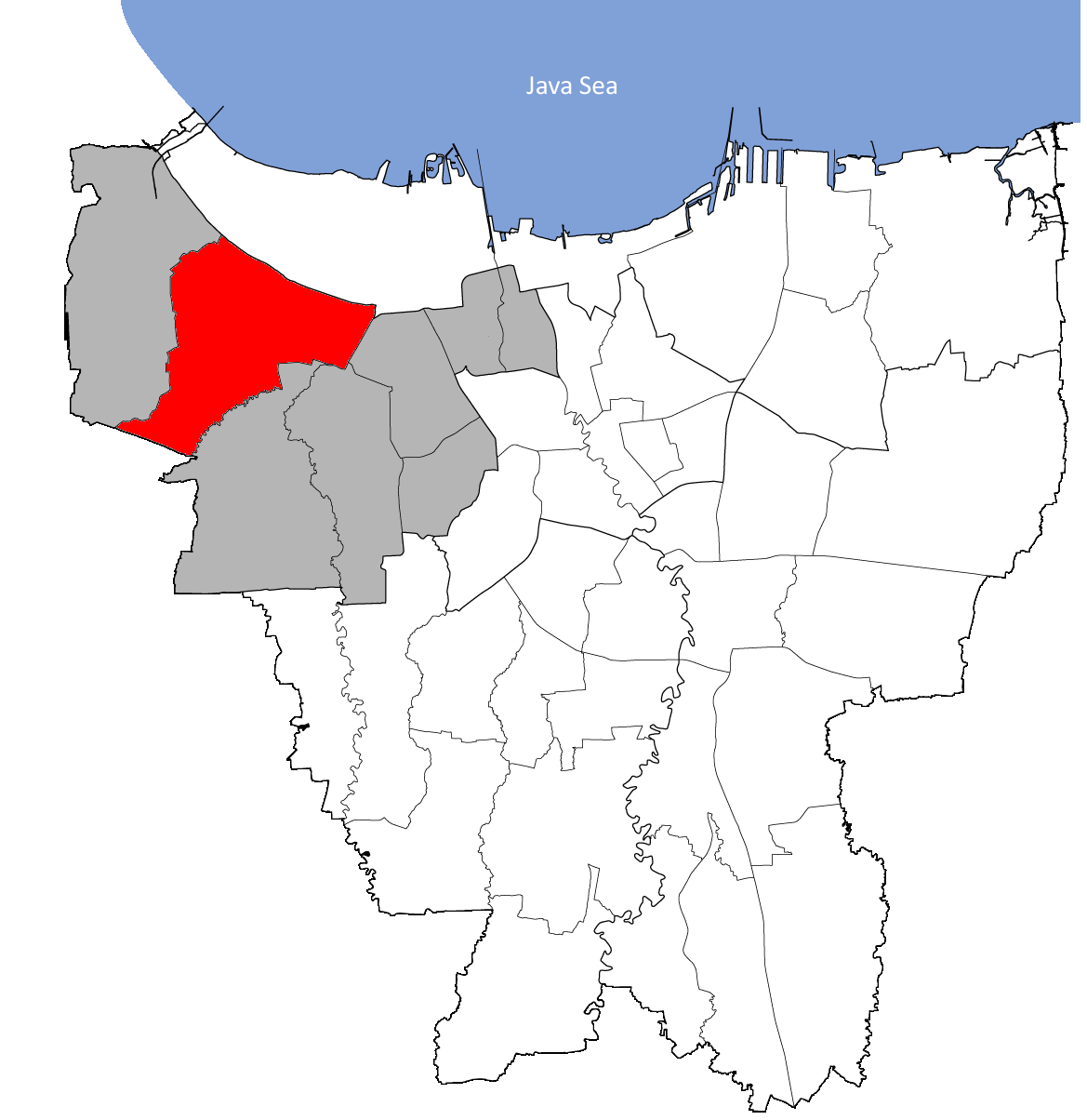
- Country: Indonesia
- Province: DKI Jakarta
- Administrative city: West Jakarta

Area
  - Total: 26.56 km^{2} (10.25 sq mi)

Population (mid 2023)
  - Total: 591,748
  - Density: 22,280/km^{2} (57,700/sq mi)

Cengkareng is a district (kecamatan) on West Jakarta, Indonesia. The Duri-Tangerang and Tangerang-Jakarta railways pass through Cengkareng.

== Urban villages ==
The district of Cengkareng is divided into six kelurahan or urban villages:

- Kedaung Kali Angke - area code 11710
- Kapuk - area code 11720
- Cengkareng Barat - area code 11730
- Cengkareng Timur - area code 11730
- Rawa Buaya - area code 11740
- Duri Kosambi - area code 11750

== List of important places ==
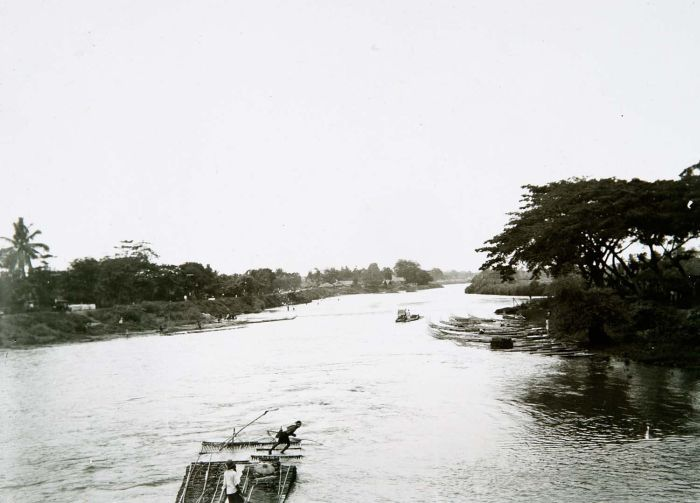
Mookervaart Canal passes through Cengkareng District.

- Soekarno-Hatta International Airport
- Mookervaart Canal, a canal connecting the Cisadane River in Tangerang and Kali Angke in Jakarta. Constructed from 1678 to 1689, this 25-30 metre wide channel is one of the important flood control water channels in Jakarta.
- Palapa Main Control Station
