= Batuceper =

- Town and district
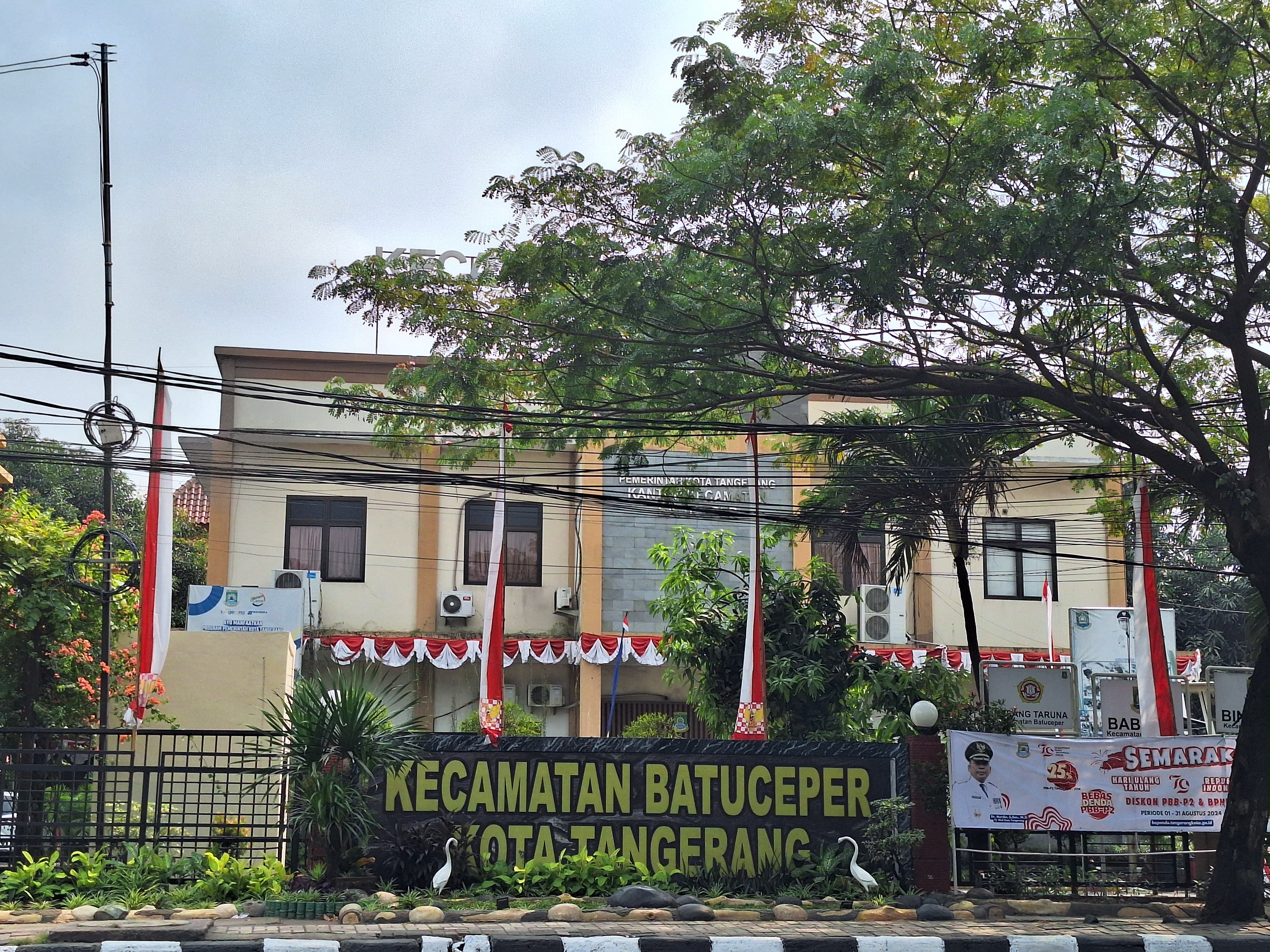
- Batuceper district office in 2024
- Interactive map of Batuceper
- Coordinates: 6.1656824°S 106.682188°E
- Country: Indonesia
- Province: Banten
- Municipality: Tangerang City

Area
  - Total: 11.58 km^{2} (4.47 sq mi)

Population (mid 2023 estimate)
  - Total: 95,474
  - Density: 8,245/km^{2} (21,350/sq mi)

Batuceper is a town and an administrative district (kecamatan) of Tangerang City, in Banten Province of Indonesia, on the island of Java. The district covers an area of 11.58 km^{2}, and had a population of 90,590 at the 2010 Census and 92,044 at the 2020 Census; the official estimate as at mid 2023 was 95,474.

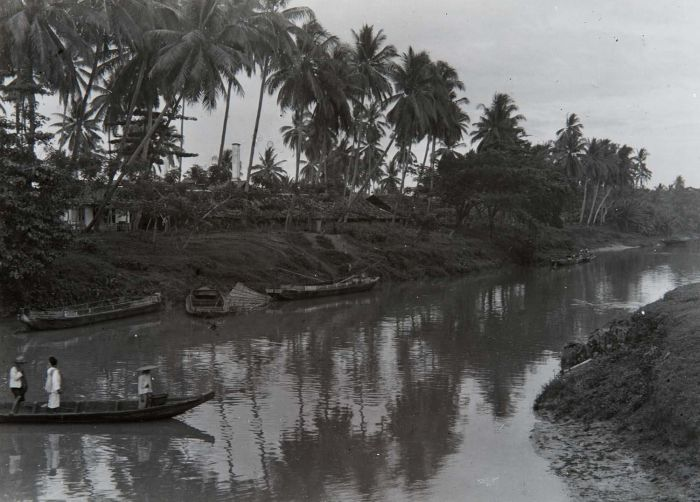
Tan Liok Tiauw's rooftile factory from across the Mookervart canal, G.F.J. Bley (1925-30)

It formed part of the particuliere land, or private domain, of Luitenant der Chinezen Tan Tiang Po and his son, Tan Liok Tiauw Sia, Landheeren or landlords of Batoe-Tjepper.

Geographically, Batuceper District is directly adjacent to DKI Jakarta and has the following regional boundaries: to the north, it is bordered by Benda District, to the south by Cipondoh District, to the east by the City of West Jakarta and to the west by Tangerang and Neglasari Districts.

== Communities ==
Batuceper District is sub-divided into seven urban communities (kelurahan), listed below with their areas and their officially-estimated populations as at mid 2022, together with their postcodes.

Kode Wilayah	Name of kelurahan	Area in km^{2}	Population mid 2022 estimate	Post code
36.71.03.1001	Batuceper (town)	1.38	14,280	15122
36.71.03.1002	Batujaya	1.42	10,777	15121
36.71.03.1003	Porisgaga	1.18	18,346	15122
36.71.03.1004	Porisgaga Baru	1.01	11,038	15122
36.71.03.1005	Kebon Besar	1.17	12,303	15122
36.71.03.1006	Batusari	1.31	17,529	15121
36.71.03.1007	Poris Jaya	1.02	10,397	15122
36.71.03	Totals	8.49	93,771 ^{(a)}	

Notes: (a) comprising 47,738 males and 46,033 females.
