= Mookervaart River =

Mookervaart River Kali Mookervaart, Sungai Mookervaart
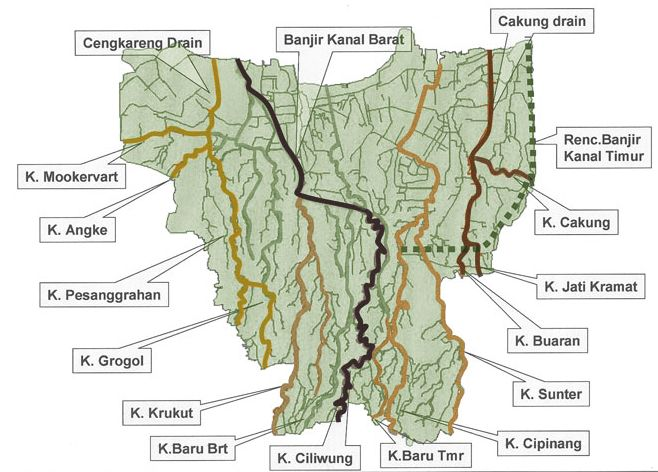
- Mookervaart River ("K. Mookervaart"), upper left in the map of rivers and canals of Jakarta (2012)
- Native name: Sungai Mokervart (Indonesian)

Location
- Country: Indonesia
- State: Jakarta

Physical characteristics
- Source
  - location: Cisadane
  - coordinates: 6°10′04″S 106°38′06″E
- Mouth: Angke River
  - coordinates: 6°09′36″S 106°46′00″E
- Length: 13 km (8.1 mi)

The Mookervaart River (Mookervaart Canal; also written in Indonesian as Mokervart) is a canal connecting the Cisadane River in Tangerang and Kali Angke (Angke River) in Jakarta. Constructed from 1678 to 1689, this 25–30 meter wide channel is one of the important flood control water channels in Jakarta.

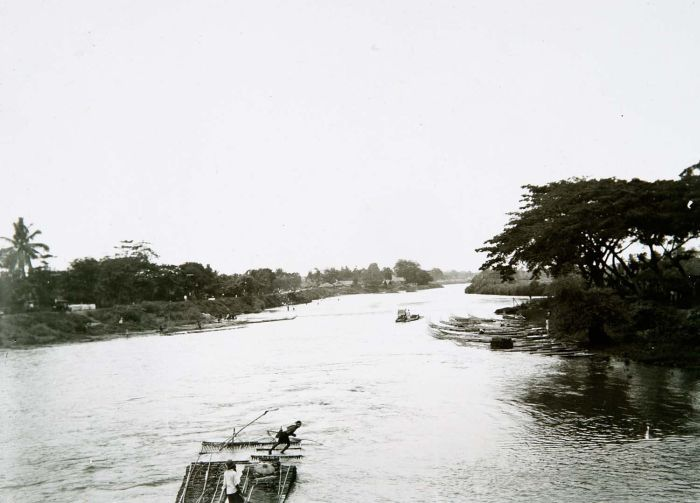
Mookervaart Canal passes through Cengkareng Subdistrict.

== History ==
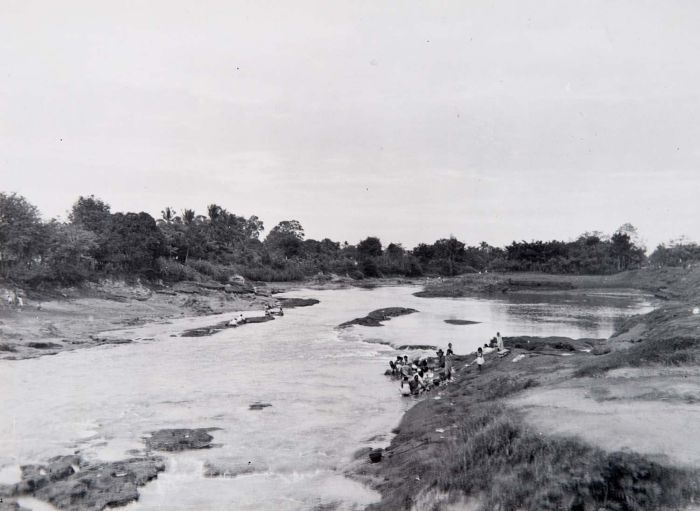
Women washing clothes near rapids in the 'Mookervaart' between Batavia and Tangerang. Date: 1920-1935.

The Mookervaart was originally constructed in 1678 to 1689 to draw one-third of the water flow from the Cisadane River and link to the city canals of Batavia, to control the flood. In 1732 Governor General Diederik Durven ordered the canal to be dug deeper to bring more water to the city, but this created stagnant pools that brought deadly illnesses, such as malaria, increasing the mortality rates. Furthermore, the canal also swells very high during the rainy season, so a lock was built at the upper end of the river in 1770. Nonetheless, the Mookervaart still supplied the most water to Batavia in the 18th century.

== Hydrology ==
The Mookervaart River has a length of 13 kilometres (8.1 mi), with a watershed area (Indonesian: Daerah Pengaliran Sungai) of 67 km². The average daily rainfall is 132 mm, with the peak debit at 125 m³.

== Geography ==
The river flows in the northwest area of Java with a predominantly tropical rainforest climate (designated as Af in the Köppen-Geiger climate classification). The annual average temperature in the area is 27 °C. The warmest month is March, when the average temperature is around 30 °C, and the coldest is May, at 26 °C. The average annual rainfall is 3674 mm. The wettest month is December, with an average of 456 mm of rainfall, and the driest is September, with 87 mm of rainfall.

== Historic place ==
Fort Anké was built by the Dutch East India Company in 1657 at the intersection of the Mookervaart channel (Mookervaart River) and the Angke River. Historical names for the fort include Anckee, Anke, and Ankee.

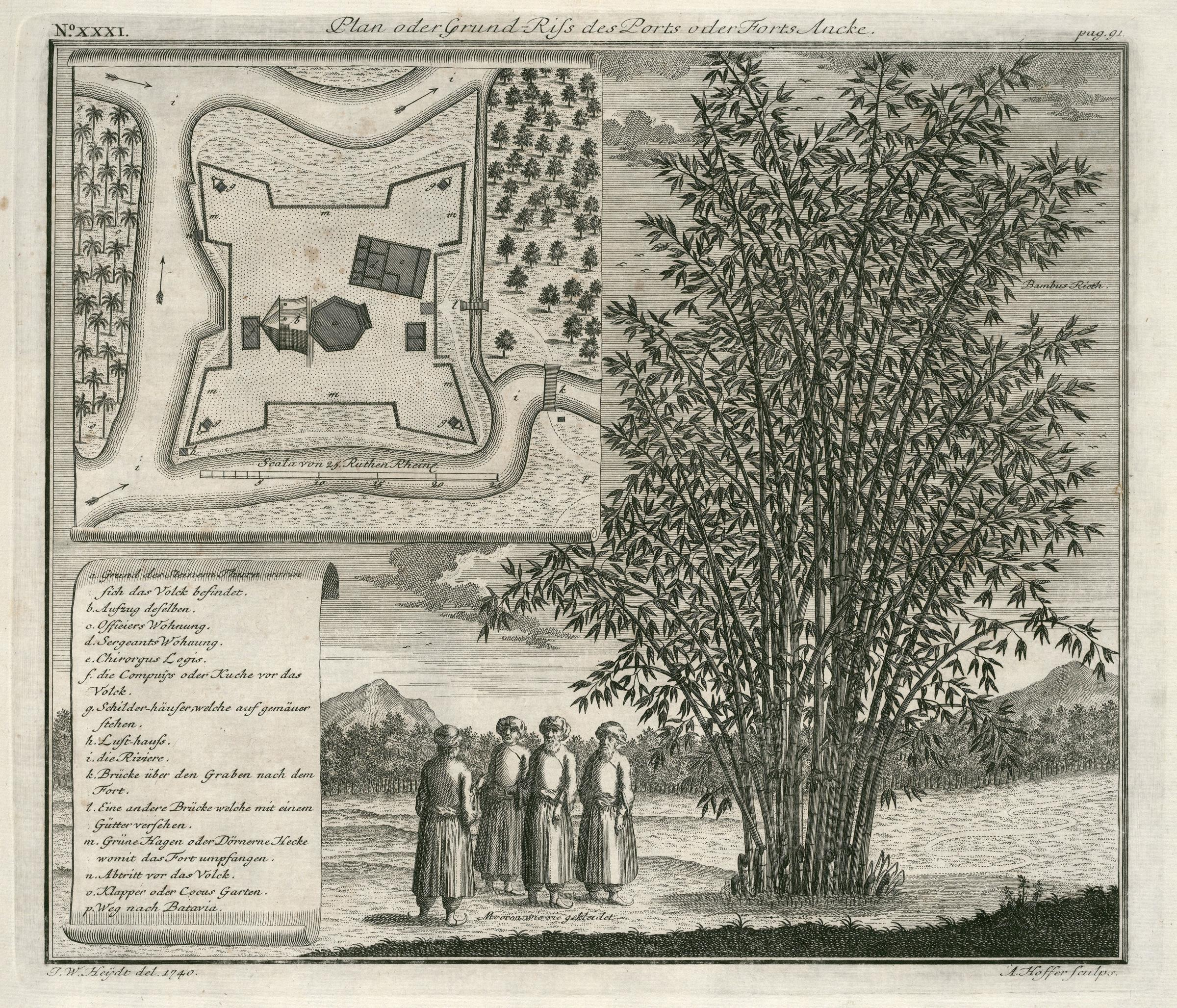
Map of Fort Anké

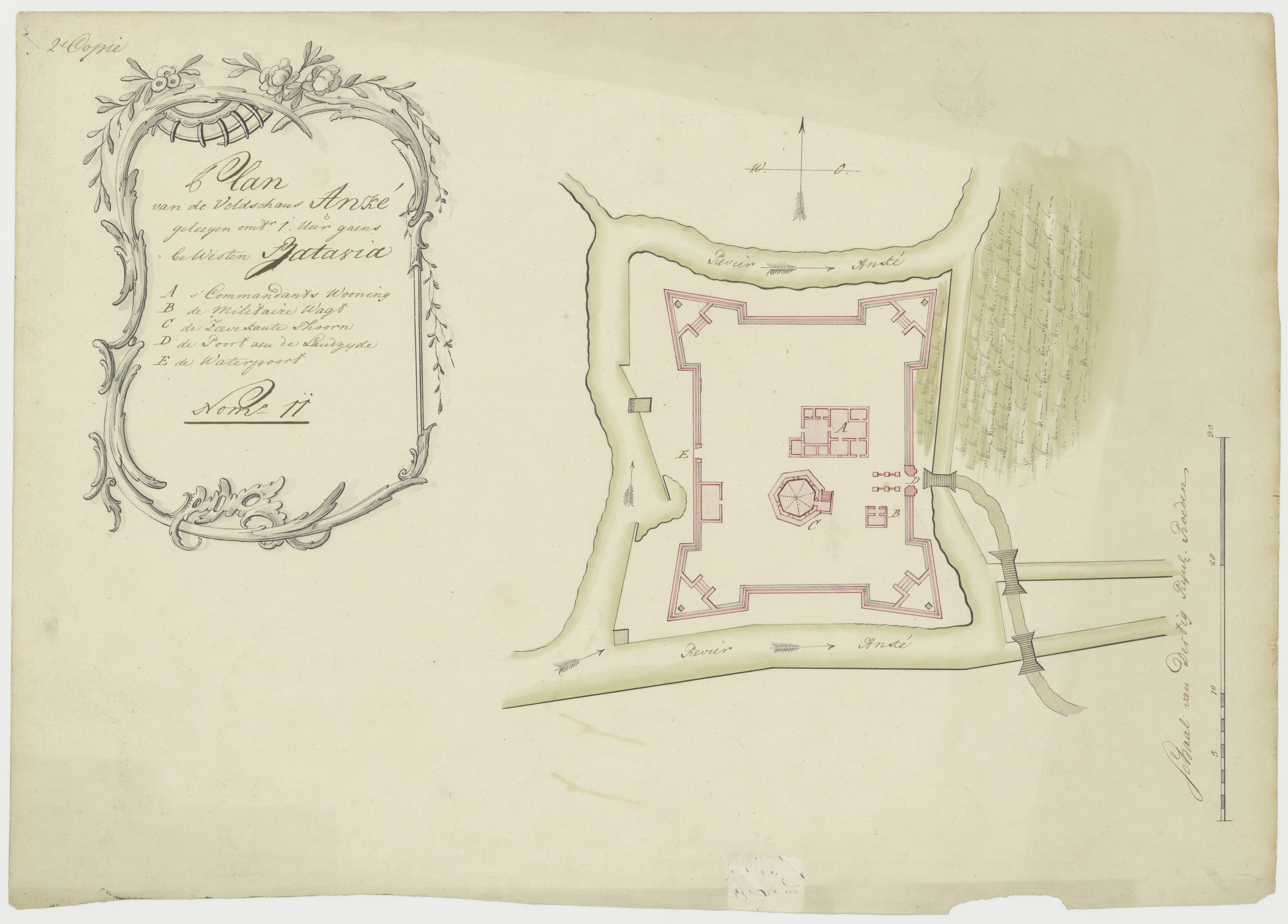
Map of the Anké entrenchment

== See also ==
- List of drainage basins of Indonesia
- List of rivers of Java
