= Istiqlal Mosque, Jakarta =

Largest mosque in Indonesia

Istiqlal Mosque مسجد الاستقلال
- Masjid Istiqlal
- Panoramic view of mosque in 2011

- Location in Jakarta

Religion
- Affiliation: Islam
- Branch/tradition: Sunni
- Leadership: Imam(s): Prof. Dr. K. H. Nasaruddin Umar (Grand Imam) Drs. H. Syarifuddin Muhammad (Deputy Grand Imam) H. Hasanuddin Sinaga; Chairman: Cdre (Ret.) H. Asep Saefuddin

Location
- Location: Jakarta, Indonesia
- Administration: Istiqlal Mosque Management Executive Board (Note: Via Ministry of State Secretariat and Ministry of Religious Affairs)
- Coordinates: 6°10′11″S 106°49′51″E

Architecture
- Architect: Friedrich Silaban
- Type: Congregational mosque
- Style: New Formalism (architecture); International Style (architecture)
- General contractor: Indonesia
- Established: 1978 (renovated in 2019-2020)
- Construction cost: Rp 7 billion (US$ 12 million)

Specifications
- Capacity: 200,000 people
- Dome: 2
- Dome dia. (outer): 45 m (148 ft)
- Minaret: 1
- Minaret height: 96.66 metres or 317.1 feet high; 66.66 m or 218.7 ft marble coated structure; plus 30 m or 98 ft stainless steel pinnacle
- Materials: Steel and concrete structure, marble tiles on floors, walls and domes, ceramics tiles, stainless steel ornaments and metalworks

Website
- eng.istiqlal.or.id

Istiqlal Mosque (Indonesian: Masjid Istiqlal, lit. 'Independence Mosque'; Arabic: مَسْجِد ٱلْإِسْتِقْلَال, romanized: Masjid al-Istiqlāl, lit. 'Mosque of the Independence') in Jakarta, Indonesia is the largest mosque in Southeast Asia and the ninth largest mosque in the world in terms of worshipper capacity. Built to commemorate Indonesian independence, this national mosque of Indonesia was named "Istiqlal", an Arabic word for "independence". The mosque was opened to the public on 22 February 1978. Within Jakarta, the mosque is positioned next to Merdeka Square, the Jakarta Cathedral (Catholic), and also of the Immanuel Church (Reformed).

== History ==
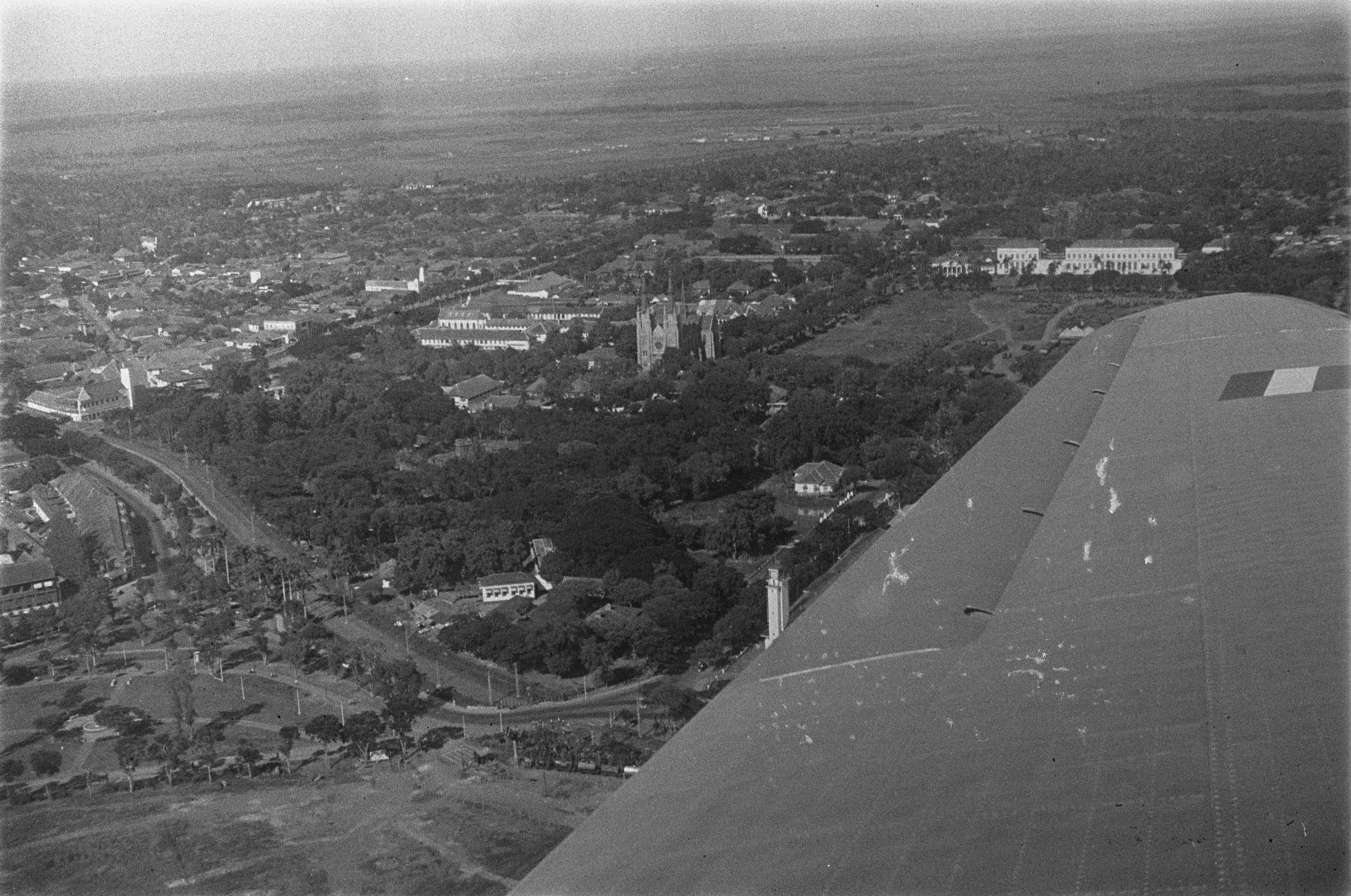
The Wilhelminapark and the Citadel Prins Frederik in 1946

The mosque was formerly the location of Wilhelmina Park and a 19th-century fortification called Citadel.

=== Design and competition ===
Istiqlal Mosque at night

After the proclamation of Indonesian independence in 1945, the idea of constructing a grand Indonesian national mosque was raised by Wahid Hasyim, Indonesia's first minister for religious affairs, and Anwar Cokroaminoto, later appointed as the chairman of the Masjid Istiqlal Foundation. The committee for the construction of the Istiqlal Mosque, led by Cokroaminoto, was founded in 1953. He proposed a national mosque to Indonesian President Sukarno, who welcomed the idea and later helped to supervise the mosque's construction. In 1954, the committee appointed Sukarno as technical chief supervisor. The architect of the Istiqlal Mosque was Friedrich Silaban, the winner of a design competition. He is the son of a Lutheran pastor from the Batak Protestant Christian Church.

Several locations were proposed; Mohammad Hatta, Indonesian vice president, suggested that the mosque should be built near residential areas on Thamrin avenue, on a plot where Hotel Indonesia stands today. However, Sukarno insisted that a national mosque should be located near the most important square of the nation, near the Merdeka Palace. This is in accordance with the Javanese tradition that the kraton (king's palace) and masjid agung (grand mosque) should be located around the alun-alun (main Javanese city square), which means it must be near Merdeka Square. Sukarno also insisted that the national mosque should be built near Jakarta Cathedral and Immanuel Church, to symbolize religious harmony and tolerance as promoted in Pancasila. It was later decided that the national mosque was going to be built in Taman Widjaja Kusuma (formerly Wilhelmina park), in front of the Jakarta Cathedral. To make way for the mosque, the Citadel Prins Frederick, built in 1837, was demolished.

=== Construction ===
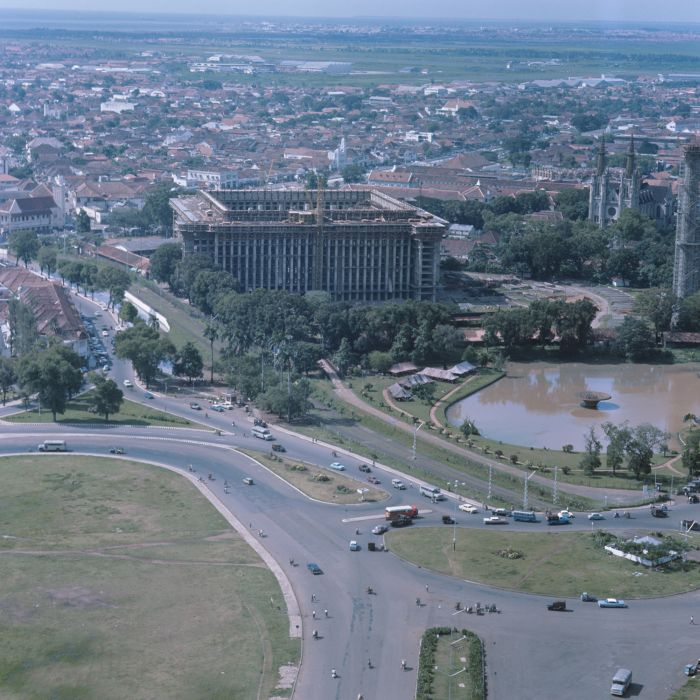
Istiqlal mosque under construction. On the right side is the Jakarta Cathedral.

The foundation stone was laid by Sukarno on 24 August 1961; the construction took 17 years. President Suharto inaugurated it as the national mosque on 22 February 1978. As of 2013, it is the largest mosque in the region of Southeast Asia, with a capacity of over 120,000.

=== Contemporary events ===
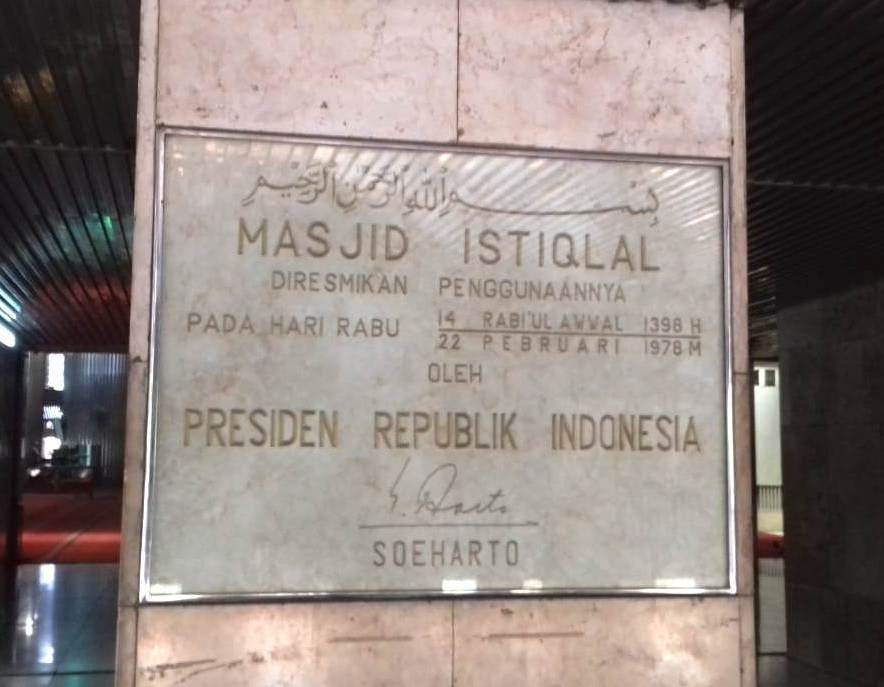
Inscription of the Inauguration of the Istiqlal Mosque in 1978

On Friday night, 14 April 1978, a bomb made of plastic explosive was set off near the mimbar in Istiqlal Mosque. There were no casualties reported. More than 20 years later, on 19 April 1999, a second bomb attack took place in the basement of the mosque, breaking the glass of the office rooms.

Between May 2019 to July 2020 the mosque underwent major renovation at a cost of US$35 million. Works included: polishing and cleaning the marble exterior and stainless steel geometric ornamentation, a new mihrab and mimbar, upgrading electrical and plumbing systems, new lighting system using LED lamps, renovation of VIP rooms, new gates and improvements of garden, park and plaza, new kiosk for vendors, and a two storied basement parking space.

A tunnel connecting Istiqlal Mosque and St. Mary of the Assumption Cathedral has been constructed by the Indonesian authorities. This tunnel, known as the "Terowongan Silaturahmi" (Tunnel of Friendship), was expected to be finished in April 2020 before Ramadan 2020.

In 2022, the mosque received EDGE (Excellence in Design for Greater Efficiencies) certification from the International Finance Corporation (IFC), a subsidiary of the World Bank. It is confirmed to be the world's first green place of worship building.

In September 2024 Pope Francis, on a visit to Indonesia, stated that the Istiqlal Mosque in Jakarta is concrete proof of the presence of religious moderation in Indonesia. And at the same time signed an Istiqlal Declaration carried out by Pope Francis, head of the Catholic Church and sovereign of the Vatican City State and Nasaruddin Umar, the Grand Imam of the Istiqlal Mosque who was accompanied by interfaith figures in Indonesia.

== Structure ==
The ablution room of the mosque, located on ground floor near the seven gates.

The mosque has seven entrances, and all seven gates are named after Al-Asmaul-Husna, the names of God in Islam. The number seven represents the Seven Heavens in Islamic cosmology. The wudu (ablution) fountains are on the ground floor, while the main prayer hall and main courtyard are on the first floor. The building consists of two connected rectangular structures: the main structure and the smaller secondary structure. The smaller one serves as a main gate as well as stairs and prayer spaces.

=== Entrance gates ===
There are seven entrance gates to the Istiqlal Mosque. Each door is named after one of the 99 Names of Allah. Below are lists of entrance gates into the complex of Istiqlal Mosque:

- Main gates
  - Al Fattah/الفتاح ("The Opener"): Located opposite of the Jakarta Cathedral. This is the main entrance for visitors, which also leads to the main parking area.
  - Ar Rozzaq/ٱلْرَّزَّاقُ ("The Provider"): Located at Jalan Perwira. The door leads to the main parking area.
  - As Salam/ٱلْسَّلَامُ ("The Peace"): Entrance for important guests e.g. clerics or ambassadors. The entrance leads to the front rows near the imam.
- Other gates
  - Al Quddus/ٱلْقُدُّوسُ ("The Holy"): Located on the northeast of the mosque complex.
  - Al Malik/الملك ("The King"): Located on the west of the mosque complex. Used for very important guests e.g. the president of Indonesia or other important guests.
  - Al Ghaffar/ٱلْغَفَّارُ ("The Forgiving"): Located on the south end of the courtyard hall building, just below the minaret of Istiqlal Mosque. This door is the closest to the southeast gate as well as the furthest from the mosque mihrab.
  - Ar Rahman/ٱلْرَّحْمَان ("The Compassion"): Located on the southwest corner of the mosque's hall building, near the entrance gate of Al Malik.

=== Dome ===
The interior of Istiqlal mosque; the grand domed prayer hall supported by 12 columns

The rectangular main prayer hall building is covered by a 45-m diameter central spherical dome; the number "45" symbolizes the 1945 Proclamation of Indonesian Independence. The main dome is adorned with a stainless steel ornamental pinnacle in the form of a crescent and star, the symbol of Islam. The smaller secondary dome is also adorned with a stainless steel pinnacle with the name of Allah (God) in Islamic calligraphy.

The dome is supported by twelve round columns, and the prayer hall is surrounded by rectangular piers carrying four levels of balconies. Twelve columns represent the (mostly accepted) birthday of the Islamic prophet Muhammad in 12th Rabi' al-awwal.

=== Interior ===
The mihrab and minbar in main hall

The main floor and the four levels of balconies make five floors in all; the number "5" represents the Five Pillars of Islam, within symbolizes the five daily prayers, and also of the Pancasila Staircases at the corners of the building give access to all floors. The main hall is reached through an entrance covered by a dome 8 meters in diameter; the number 8 symbolizes August, the month of Indonesian Independence.

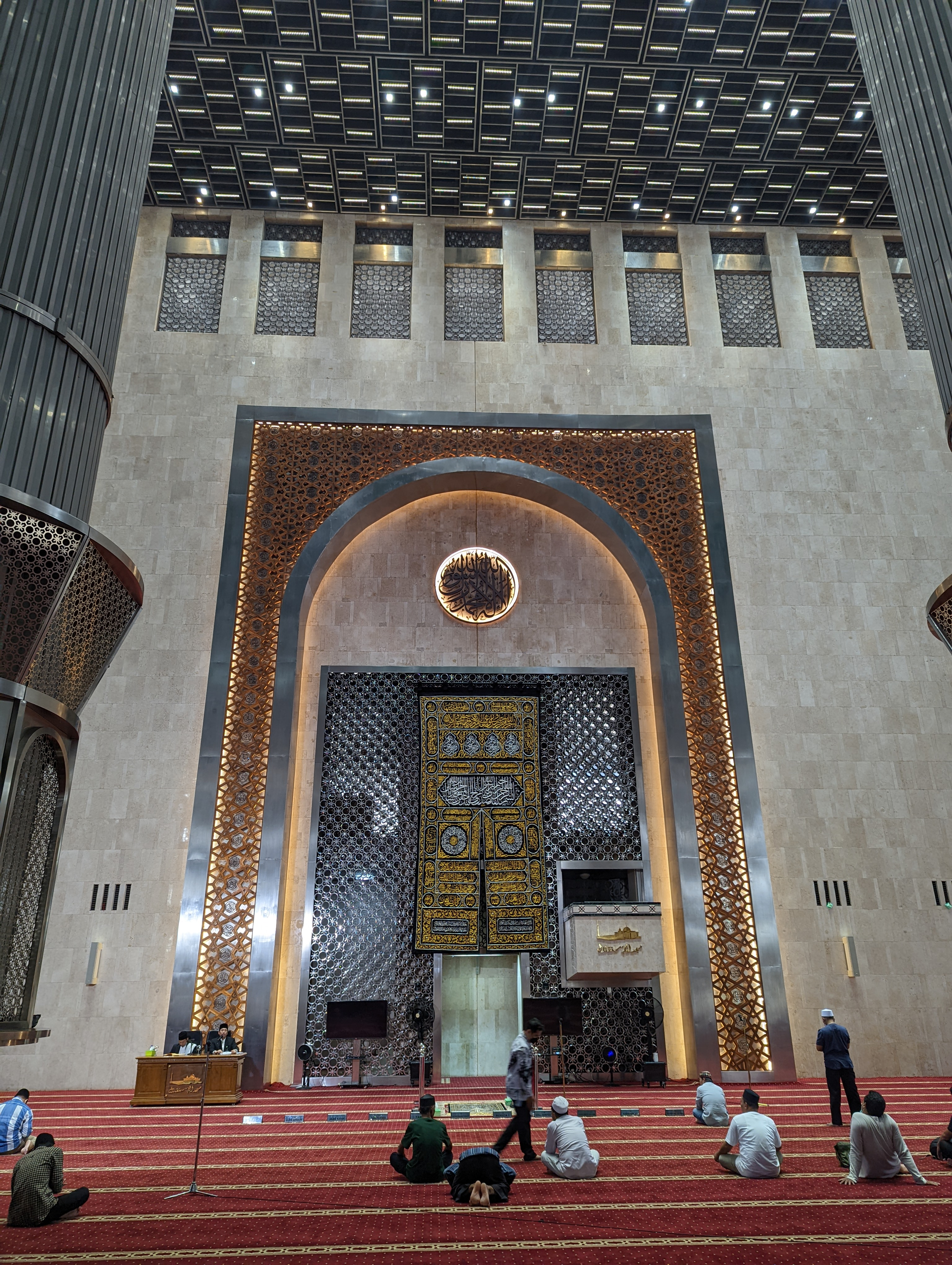
Interior

The interior design is minimalist, simple and clean-cut, with a minimum of stainless steel geometric ornaments. The 12 columns are covered with stainless steel. On the main wall on qibla there is a mihrab and minbar in the center. On the main wall, there is a large metalwork in Arabic calligraphy, spelling the name of Allah on the right side and Muhammad on the left side, and also calligraphy of Surah Thaha 14th verse in the center. The metalworks, stainless steel covers and ornaments were imported from Germany. Originally, as in the National Monument nearby, the white marbles were planned to be imported from Italy. However to cut costs and support the local marble industry, it was later decided that the marbles would be from Tulungagung marble quarries in East Java instead.

=== Minaret ===
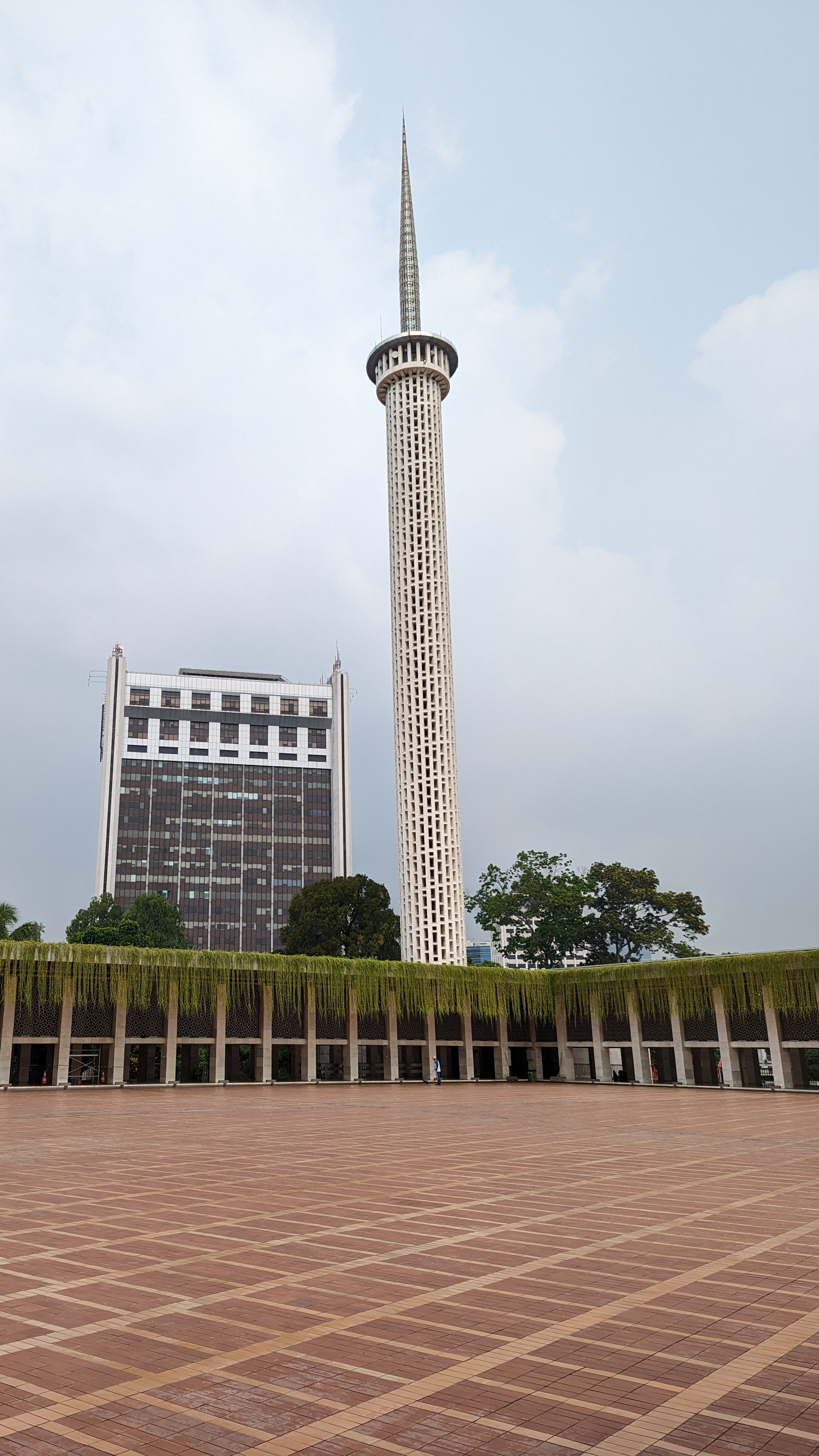
Minaret

The main structure is directly connected to the arcades that are spread around the large courtyard. The arcades connect the main building with a single minaret in the southern corner. Unlike many Arabic, Persian, Turkish and Indian mosques with multiple minarets, Istiqlal mosque has a single minaret to symbolize the divine oneness of God. It is 66.66 m tall to symbolize (incorrectly) the 6,666 verses in the Quran. The 30-metre-high stainless steel pinnacle on top of the minaret symbolizes the 30 juz' of the Quran. On the southern side near the minaret there is also a large bedug (large wooden drum made of cow skin). In common with the entire Islamic world, traditionally Muslims in Indonesia use the drum with the adhan (call to prayer). The mosque offices, function hall, and madrasah are on the ground floor. The mosque provides facilities for social and cultural activities.

Some Muslims in Indonesia said Istiqlal's dome and minaret structure was much too modern and Arabic in style. They regarded the architecture as being out of harmony with Islamic culture and architecture in Indonesia. In response, former president Suharto began an initiative to construct more mosques of the Javanese triple-roofed design.

=== Capacity ===
Prayer on Eid ul-Fitr

Istiqlal Mosque can hold pilgrims as many as 200,001 people consisting of:

1. The main prayer room and balcony and wing contain 61,000 people.
2. The space in the preliminary building contains 8,000 people.
3. The open terrace room on the 2nd floor contains 50,000 people.
4. All corridors and other places contain 81,000 people.

== Facilities ==
In a display of religious tolerance, during large Christian celebrations such as Christmas, Istiqlal Mosque helped provide parking space for worshippers of the nearby Jakarta Cathedral.

=== Sound system and multimedia ===
For the purpose of worship and information facilities, Istiqlal Mosque uses a centrally controlled sound system located on the rear glass room of the second floor, with the number of speakers as many as 200 channels spread on the main floor.

The number of speakers contained in the corridor, connecting building and preliminary building are 158 channels. The sound system is controlled by 26 amplifiers and 5 (five) mixers and is supervised by six people who take turns both day and night when in use.

To support the smooth communication at the time of worship and activity, on the main floor, there has also been installed a plasma TV system so that access information can be followed evenly by the pilgrims who are throughout the main room of the mosque and cannot directly see the preacher.

=== Garden ===
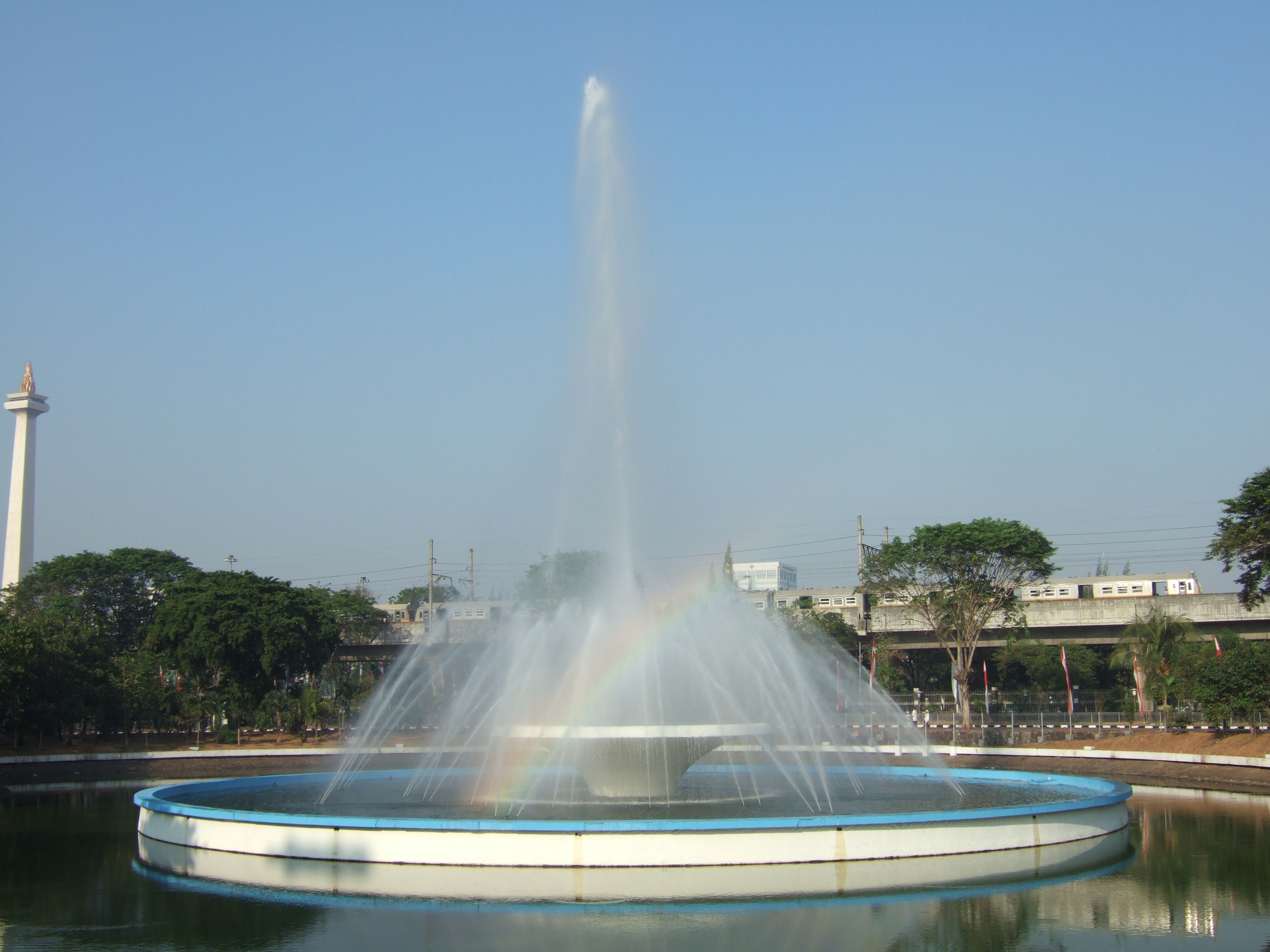
The fountain with the Monas monument in the background

Istiqlal mosque is located on former Wilhelmina Park, thus prior of mosque construction, there are numbers of decorative plants and trees planted in the garden. Some of garden's old large trees might be hundred years old. The park is also the location of a river branch, the distributary of Ciliwung river, completed with floodgates. The original river branch went westward to Molenvliet and turned northward along canal towards its estuarine in old Batavia. The other branch turned northward to a floodgate which drain eastward along a canal in front of Pasar Baru, the canal turned north along Jalan Gunung Sahari, all the way to Ancol in the north.

In the southwestern corner of the garden surrounding the mosque, there is a large pool and a grand fountain that spouts water 45 m (148 ft) high. The fountain only operates on Fridays during congregational salat and during Islamic holidays such as Eid ul-Fitr and Eid ul-Adha. The river Ciliwung flows across the mosque complex along the eastern side of the mosque.

== Environmental initiatives ==
Grand Imam Nasaruddin Umar has led efforts to make the mosque more environmentally friendly, including installing solar panels, using slow-flow faucets, and implementing a water recycling system. The mosque's efforts have earned it recognition as the first green-certified place of worship by the World Bank.

== Leadership ==
The Mihrab of Istiqlal Mosque which also shows the place of the Imam during congregation prayer (center) and the microphone used by the Muezzin for Adhan (far right)

Istiqlal Mosque has one Grand Imam, one Deputy Grand Imam, and seven imams. As of 2016, the Grand Imam is the former Deputy Minister for Religious Affairs (2011–2014), Nasaruddin Umar and the Chairman of Istiqlal Mosque is the former Indonesian Ambassador to Syria (2006–2010), Muhammad Muzammil Basyuni. The seven imams are : 1. Hasanuddin Sinaga 2. Ahmad Husni Ismail 3. Martomo Malang 4. Mohammad Salim Ghazali 5. Ahmad Rafiuddin Mahfuz 6. Ansharuddin Ibrahim 7. Ahmad Muzakir Abdul Rahman

== Visitors ==
US President Barack Obama and First Lady Michelle Obama with Grand Imam Kyai al-Hajj Ali Musthafa Ya'qub at the Istiqlal Mosque, Nov. 10, 2010

Following US President Barack Obama and his wife's visit to the Istiqal Mosque in November 2010, about 20 visitors per day have come to tour the mosque. Among foreign dignitaries who have visited Istiqlal mosque are former US president Bill Clinton; President of Iran Mahmoud Ahmadinejad; former Libyan leader Muammar Gaddafi; King Charles III of the United Kingdom; Li Yuanchao, former Vice President of China; President of Chile Sebastián Piñera; Heinz Fischer, the President of Austria; Jens Stoltenberg, the Prime Minister of Norway, and German Chancellor Angela Merkel in 2012. King Salman Of Saudi Arabia visited the mosque during his Indonesia tour in March 2017.

== Interfaith Dialogue and Hebrew Language Education ==
View from courtyard

As Southeast Asia’s largest mosque, Istiqlal Mosque in Jakarta has long positioned itself as a center not only for Islamic worship but also for promoting religious moderation and intercultural dialogue. The mosque administration frequently hosts discussions, seminars, and cultural events aimed at fostering better understanding among different faiths and communities in Indonesia, which is home to the world’s largest Muslim population. These initiatives align with Istiqlal’s vision to become a symbol of tolerance and national unity.

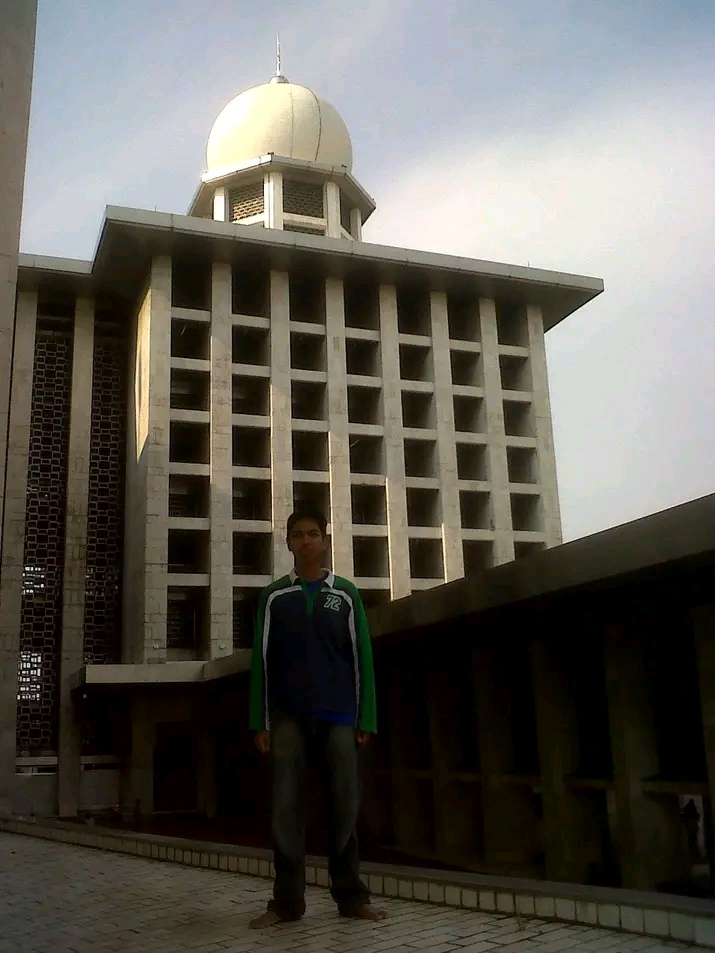
Situation of Istiqlal Mosque in 2013

Since 2024, Istiqlal Mosque has offered a Hebrew language course as part of a broader slate of free public education programs. The course is taught by Sapri Sale, who is credited by Indonesian and international media as the first person to teach modern Hebrew openly to the public in Indonesia, and as the author of the first Indonesian–Hebrew bilingual dictionary.

== Transportation ==
The Istiqlal Mosque is within walking distance of the Transjakarta's two bus stations: Istiqlal and Juanda. It is also near the Bogor Line's Juanda Station of the KRL Commuterline. There are bus stops nearby for MikroTrans angkots and other buses.

== See also ==
- Islamic architecture
- Tunnel of Friendship
- List of mosques in Asia
- List of largest mosques
- List of tallest domes
