= Jakarta Cathedral =

Catholic church in Indonesia

- The Church of Our Lady of the Assumption; Gereja Santa Perawan Maria Diangkat ke Surga; De Kerk van Onze Lieve Vrouwe ten Hemelopneming
- Gereja Katedral Jakarta; Kathedraal van Jakarta
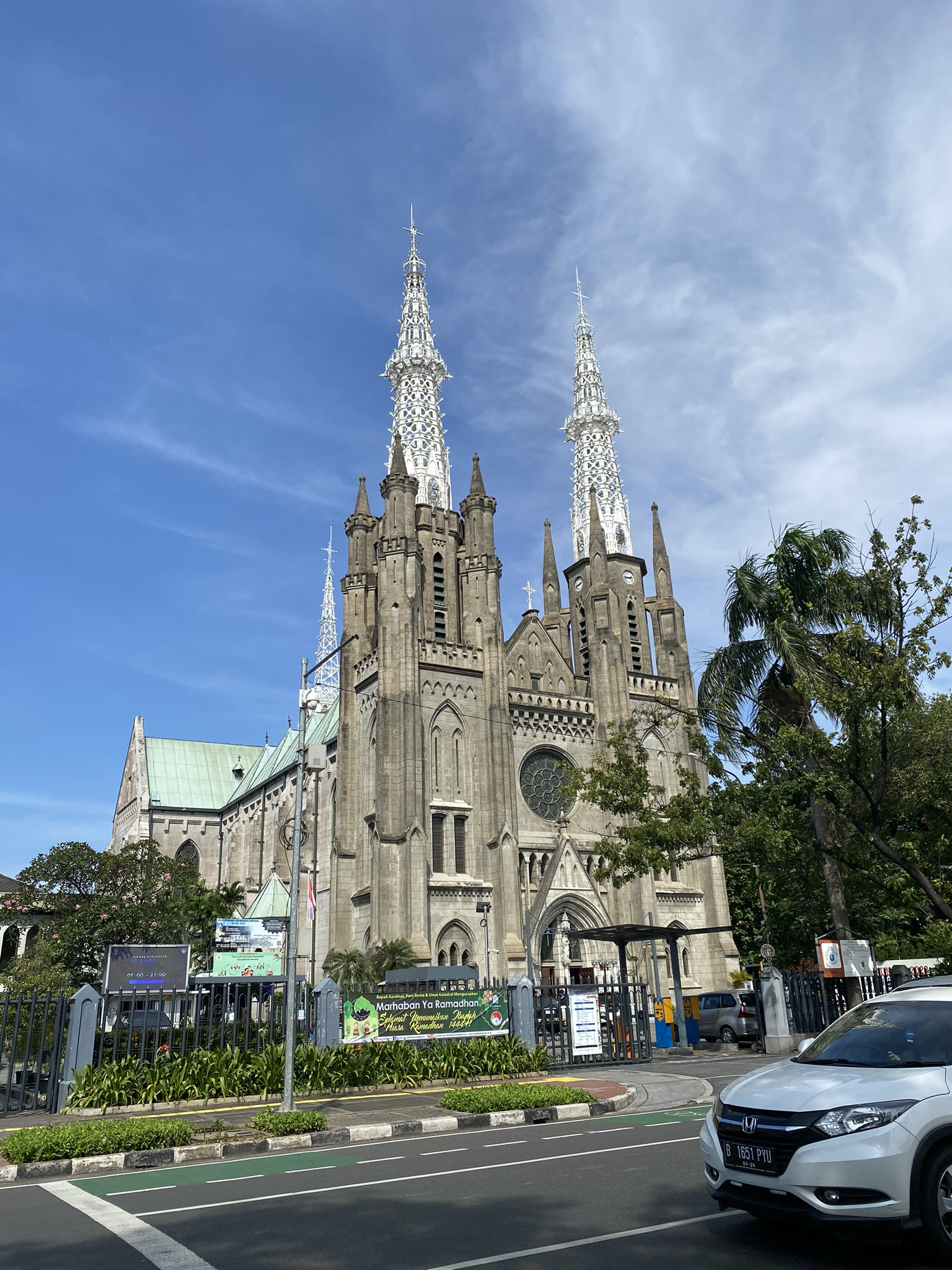
- Jakarta Cathedral in 2024

- Location within Jakarta
- 6°10′09″S 106°49′59″E
- Location: Sawah Besar, Central Jakarta, Jakarta, Indonesia
- Denomination: Catholic Church
- Religious institute: Jesuit
- Website: www.katedraljakarta.or.id

History
- Status: Cathedral
- Consecrated: 21 April 1901

Architecture
- Architect(s): Antonius Dijkmans, SJ
- Style: Gothic Revival
- Groundbreaking: 1891
- Completed: 1901
- Construction cost: 628,000 Netherlands Indies guilder (in 1891)

Specifications
- Length: 60 metres (200 ft)
- Width: 10 metres (33 ft)
- Height: 60 metres (200 ft)
- Materials: bricks covered with plaster, teak roof construction, and iron construction spires.

Administration
- Archdiocese: Archdiocese of Jakarta
- Deanery: Central Jakarta

Jakarta Cathedral (Indonesian: Gereja Katedral Jakarta; Dutch: Kathedraal van Jakarta) is a Latin Catholic cathedral in Jakarta, Indonesia, which is also the seat of the Archbishop of Jakarta, currently Cardinal Ignatius Suharyo Hardjoatmodjo. Its official name is the Church of Our Lady of the Assumption (Gereja Santa Perawan Maria Diangkat ke Surga, derived from the original name in Dutch: De Kerk van Onze Lieve Vrouwe ten Hemelopneming). This current cathedral was consecrated in 1901 and built in the neo-Gothic style, a common architectural style to build churches at that time. The Jakarta Cathedral is located in Central Jakarta near Merdeka Square and Merdeka Palace. The Istiqlal Mosque is located next to the cathedral.

== History ==
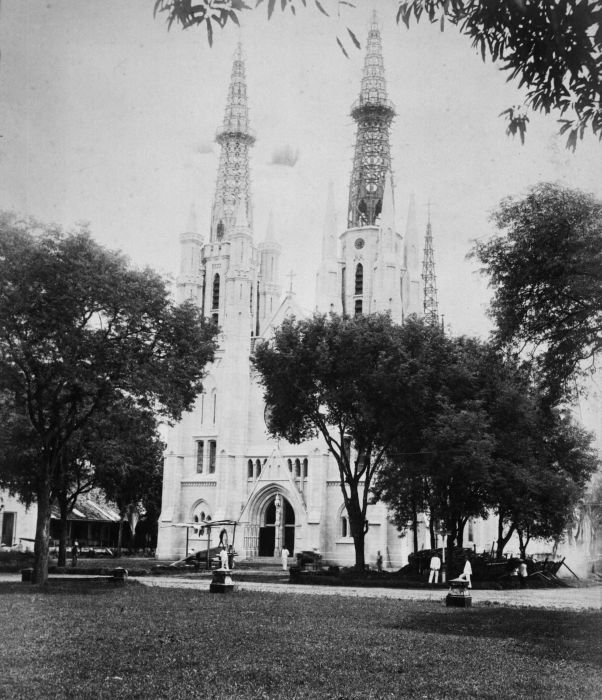
The cathedral c. 1870–1900

After the arrival of Dutch East India Company in 1619, the Catholic Church was banned in the Dutch East Indies and was limited to Flores and Timor. The Netherlands was known to support Protestantism and tried to limit the influence and authority of the Holy See. During the French Revolutionary Wars and the Napoleonic Wars, the Netherlands, including the Dutch East Indies and its other colonies, fell under the control of Revolutionary France and later the French Empire. In 1806, Napoleon installed his Catholic younger brother Louis Napoleon (Dutch: Lodewijk) as the King of Holland. Since then, the Catholic Church has been free to operate in the Dutch East Indies.

The commissioner-general of Batavia, Leonard du Bus de Gisignies (1825–1830), was credited with providing land to build the first Catholic church in Batavia. The former residence of General de Kock in the Weltevredeen area was renovated to be a church. Monseigneur Prinsen blessed and inaugurated the church on 6 November 1829 and named it "Our Lady of the Assumption." The church was renovated in 1859, but collapsed on 9 April 1890.

The present church is the structure that was rebuilt between 1891 and 1901. Pastor Antonius Dijkmans, SJ was appointed as the architect. Construction was halted due to a lack of funding, but the church's new bishop, Mgr E. S. Luypen, SJ, raised the necessary funds in the Netherlands, and architect M.J. Hulswit (1862-1921) resumed construction in 1899. Marius Hulswit simplified Dijkmans' design, allowing it to be built by construction workers without practical training. For that reason he added cast-iron spires to the church. The church portal is inscribed with "Marius Hulswit Architectus erexit me 1899-1901." "De Kerk van Onze Lieve Vrouwe ten Hemelopneming - The Church of Our Lady of the Assumption" was blessed and inaugurated by Mgr Edmundus Sybrandus Luypen, SJ on 21 April 1901. The church was renovated between 1988 and 2002.

A tunnel connecting the church and Istiqlal Mosque was constructed between 2020 and 2021.

== Architecture ==
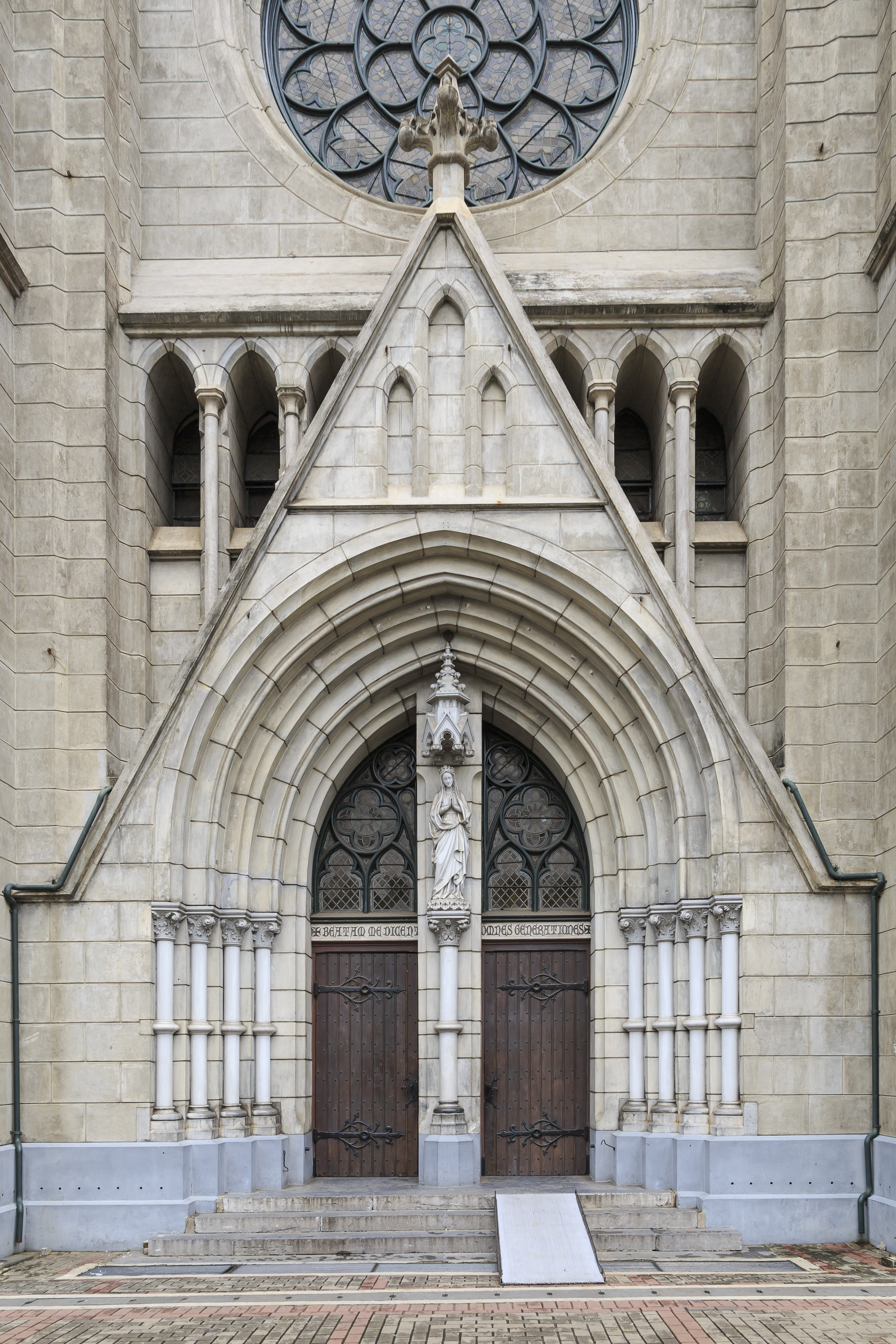
The main entrance

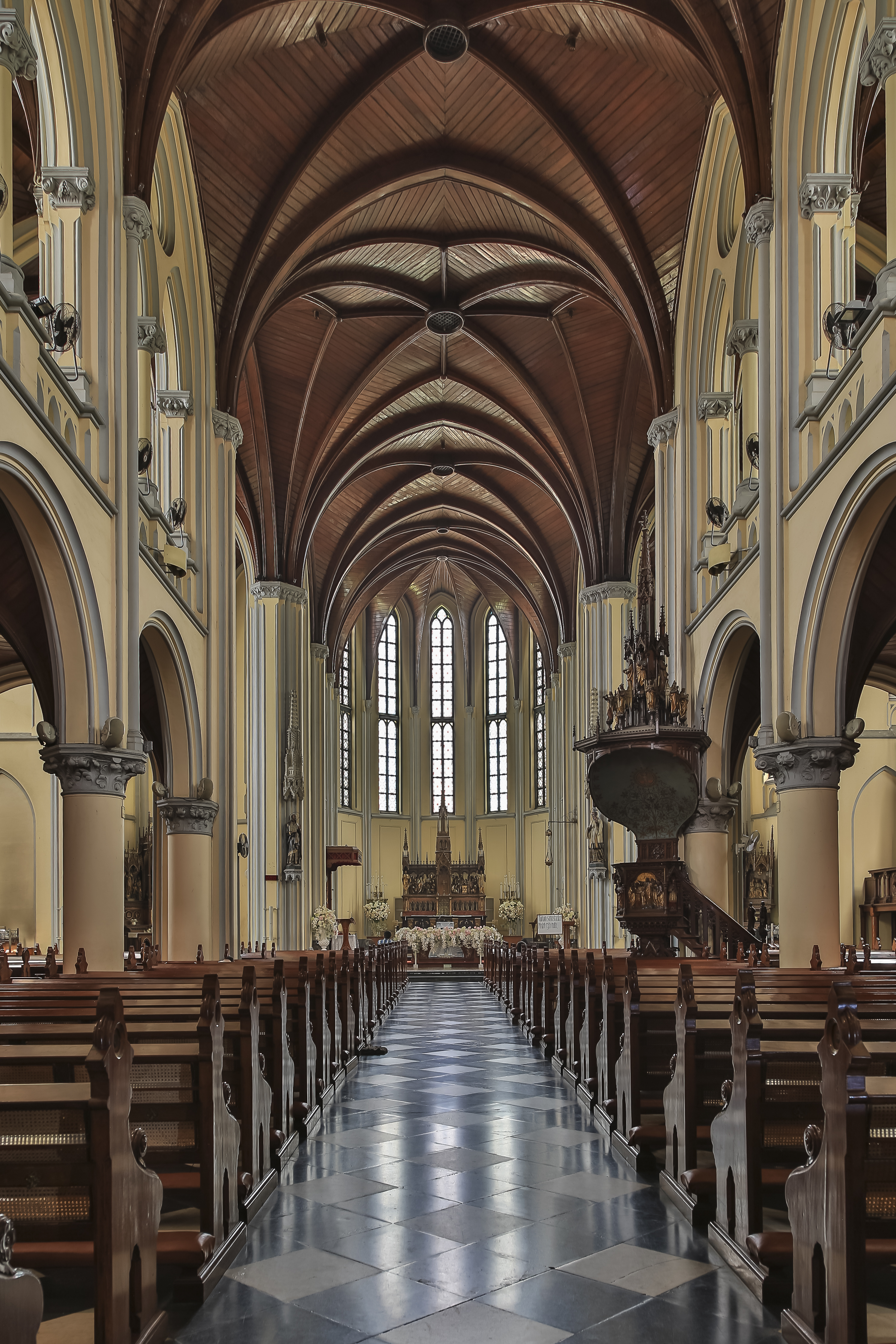
View of the cathedral nave and vault

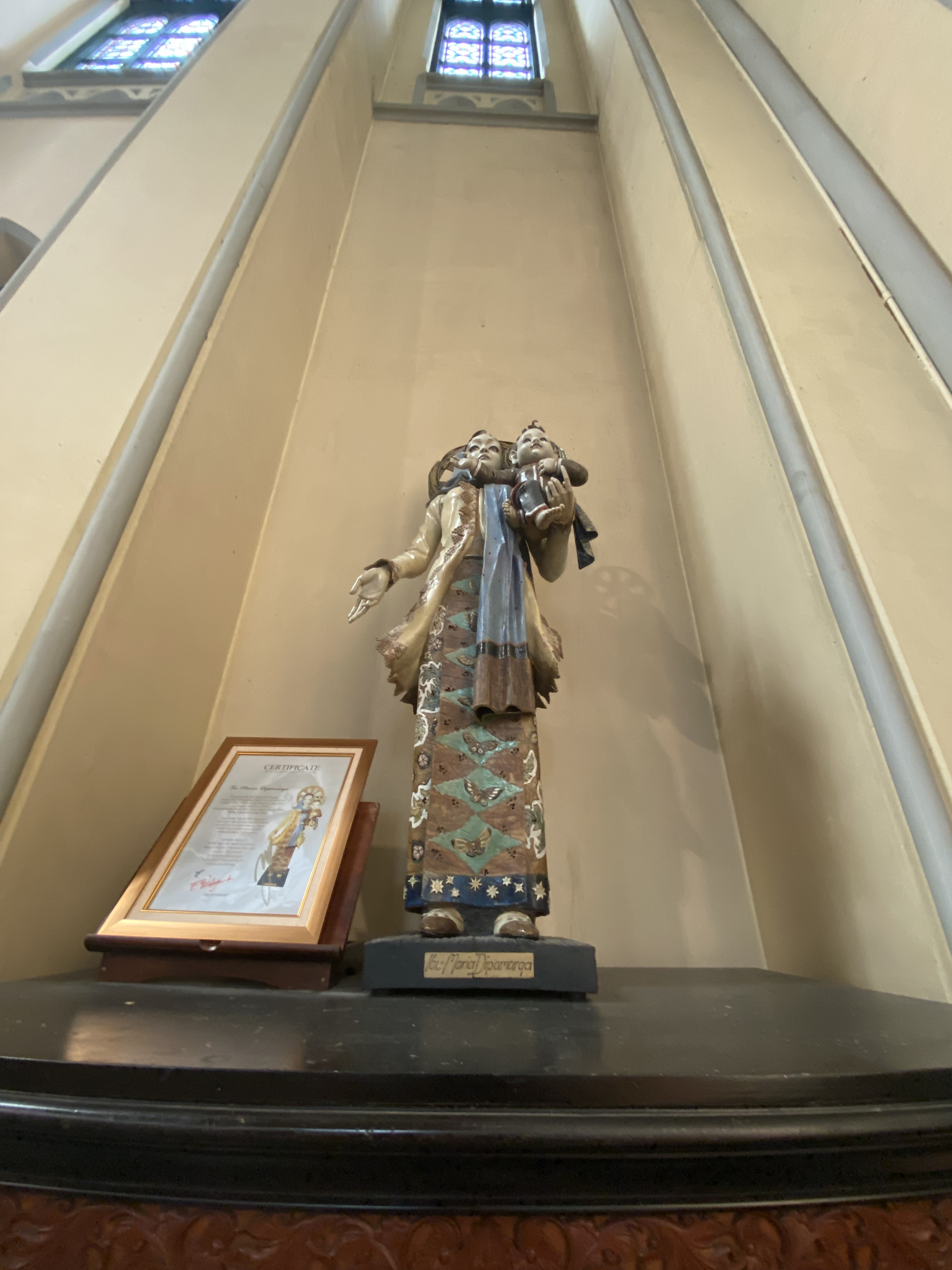
Mother Mary and Baby Jesus in Betawi traditional costume

The plan of the cathedral took the form of a cross. Complete with a narthrex, nave, crossing, transepts, aisles, choir, and an apse on the eastern end. with a length from the narthrex to the apse of 60 meters and 10 meters wide, plus 5 metres on each aisle. It is a cathedral because it contains the "cathedra", the throne of bishop. The main entrance of the building is facing west. At the trumeau of the main portal stands a statue of Our Lady while on top of the portal there is a quote from the Magnificat: "Beatam Me Dicentes Omnes Generationes" which means "All generations shall call me blessed". Besides, there is a large rose window Rozeta Rosa Mystica, which is the symbol of Mother Mary.

There are three main spires in Jakarta Cathedral: the two tallest ones measured 60 metres tall and are located in front on each side of the portal they are collectively known as the narthrex. The north tower is called Turris Davidica, or "Tower of David"—a devotional title of Mary symbolizing Mary as the refuge and protector against the power of darkness. The south tower, also 60 metres tall, is called "The Ivory Tower", which the whiteness and pureness of ivory describe the pureness of the Virgin Mary. On the Ivory Tower, there are old clocks that are still functioning as well as a church bell. The third spire rises above the crossing and measured 45 metres tall from the ground, and is called "The Angelus Dei Tower".

The building consists of two floors, the triforium can be reached from a flight of stairs in the northern tower. Originally, the triforium used to be the place for the choir during masses, but since the cathedral is quite old, there is concern that the building cannot support the weight of too many people upstairs. Today, the trifoeium also functions as the Jakarta Cathedral Museum, housing the relics of Catholic rituals, such as the silver cups, hats and robes of the Dutch East Indies and Indonesian archbishops and cardinals. The museum also displays the history of the Catholic Church in Indonesia.

On the southern side, there is a statue of Pietà, describing the sadness of Mother Mary while holding the body of Jesus Christ after the crucifixion. The wall surrounded the interior has several scenes depicting Stations of the Cross. The cathedral has four confessionals for confession services, two on each side. At the first bay of the nave, there is a large pulpit with shell-shaped roof for sound reflection. The pulpit was installed in 1905 and is decorated with images of Hell on the lower side while the images of Jesus' sermons and other scenes are on the middle side. The top of the podium displays the scene of Heaven adorned with winged angels. On the southern side, there is a large neo-Gothic style organ made in Verschueren, Belgium, then moved and installed in Jakarta in 1988. This organ was taken from Amby village near Maastricht.

There are three altars in this cathedral: on the left side is "The Altar of Saint Mary", to celebrate the assumption of Mary to Heaven. The altar was made in 1915 by Atelier Ramakers. On the right side is "The Altar of Saint Joseph", completed in May 1922. The throne of the bishop, called the cathedra, is located on the left side with three thrones. The main altar located in the centre was made in the 19th century in the Netherlands. It was moved from a Jesuit church in Groningen in 1956. In this altar, there is a main cross of Jesus and the tabernacle.

The body of the building was made of thick red bricks covered with plaster and applied with patterns to mimic natural stone construction. The large wall was covered with a wooden groin vault typical of the dutch style, above it was a space containing the trusses which beared the weight of the copper roof. The top of the spires was made from the iron frame, while the roofs were made of teak wood construction. Iron and wood are not suitable as typical neo-Gothic architecture materials usually employ stone masonry. However, these materials were chosen because they are relatively lighter than stone masonry, considering Indonesia is a region that is prone to earthquakes.

== Music ==
A responsorial Psalm is sung between the readings

There is a piano, two electones, and two playable pipe organs.

=== Pipe organ ===
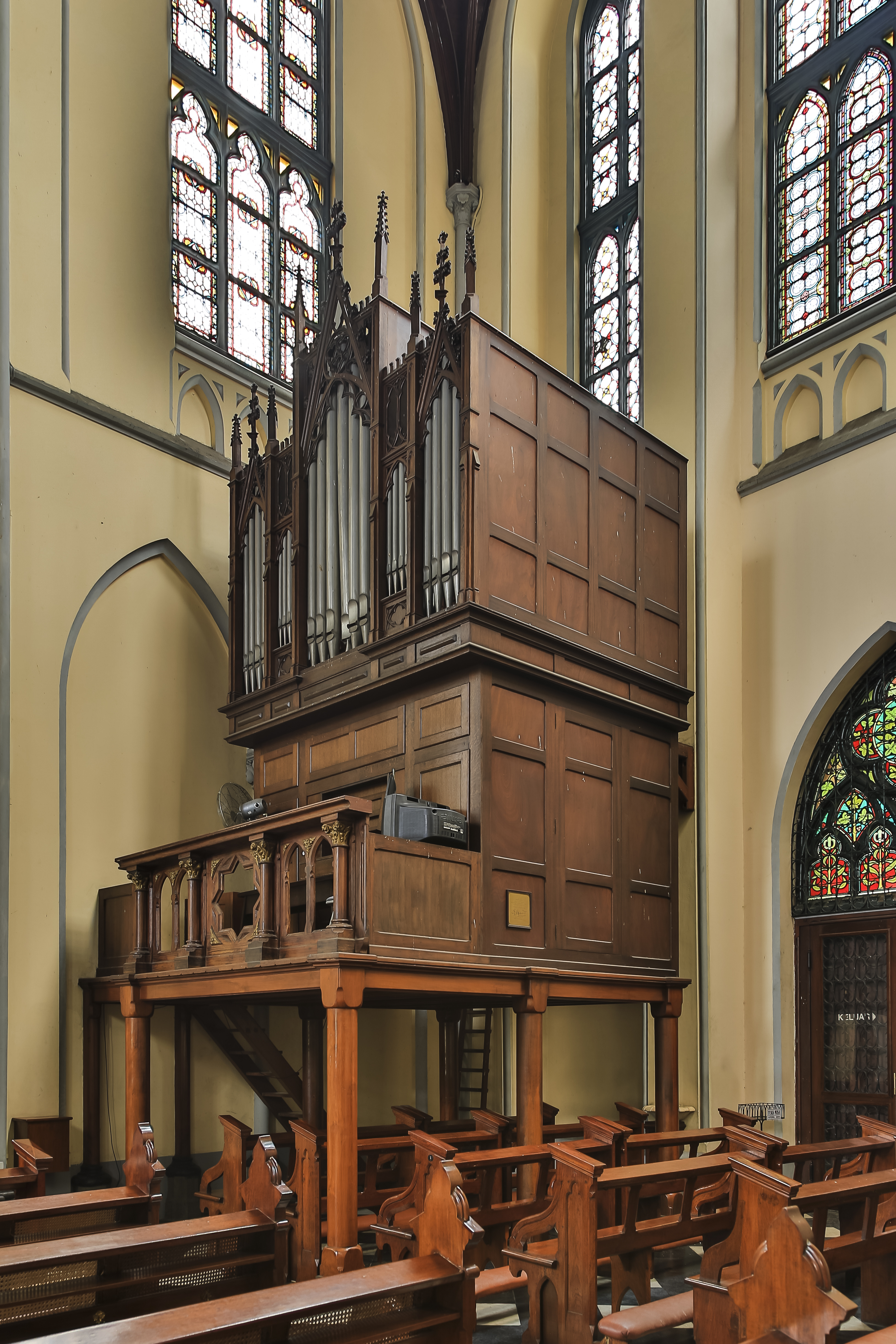
Pipe organ

On an elevated platform in the south transept sits an organ made by George Verschueren of Tongeren, Belgium, built in 1988. Draw stops were arranged on each side of the key desk and wind was activated from a stop on the left side. Manuals are of four octaves and the flat pedalboard of two-and-a-half octaves. The organ loft railing and organ casework reflect the gothic nature of the cathedral and all timbers are stained to match the existing woodwork of the church. Pipes are presented in flats with a large central tower and two flanking small towers in the left and right extremities of the case.

The stoplist of the organ is:

Manual I (56 notes/4 octaves)

1. Gamba 8'
2. Bourdon 8'
3. Flute 8'
4. Nazard 2 2/3'
5. Gemshorn 2'
6. Trumpet 8'

Manual II (56 notes/4 octaves)

1. Bourdon 16'
2. Open Diapason 8'
3. Stopped Diapason 8'
4. Octave 4'
5. Fifteenth 2'
6. Sesquieltera rk Bass
7. Sesquieltera rk Treble
8. Mixture IV ranks

Pedal (30 notes/2 1/2 octaves)

1. Subbass 16'
2. Open Wood 8'

Coupler

- I + II
- P + I
- P + II

== Gallery ==
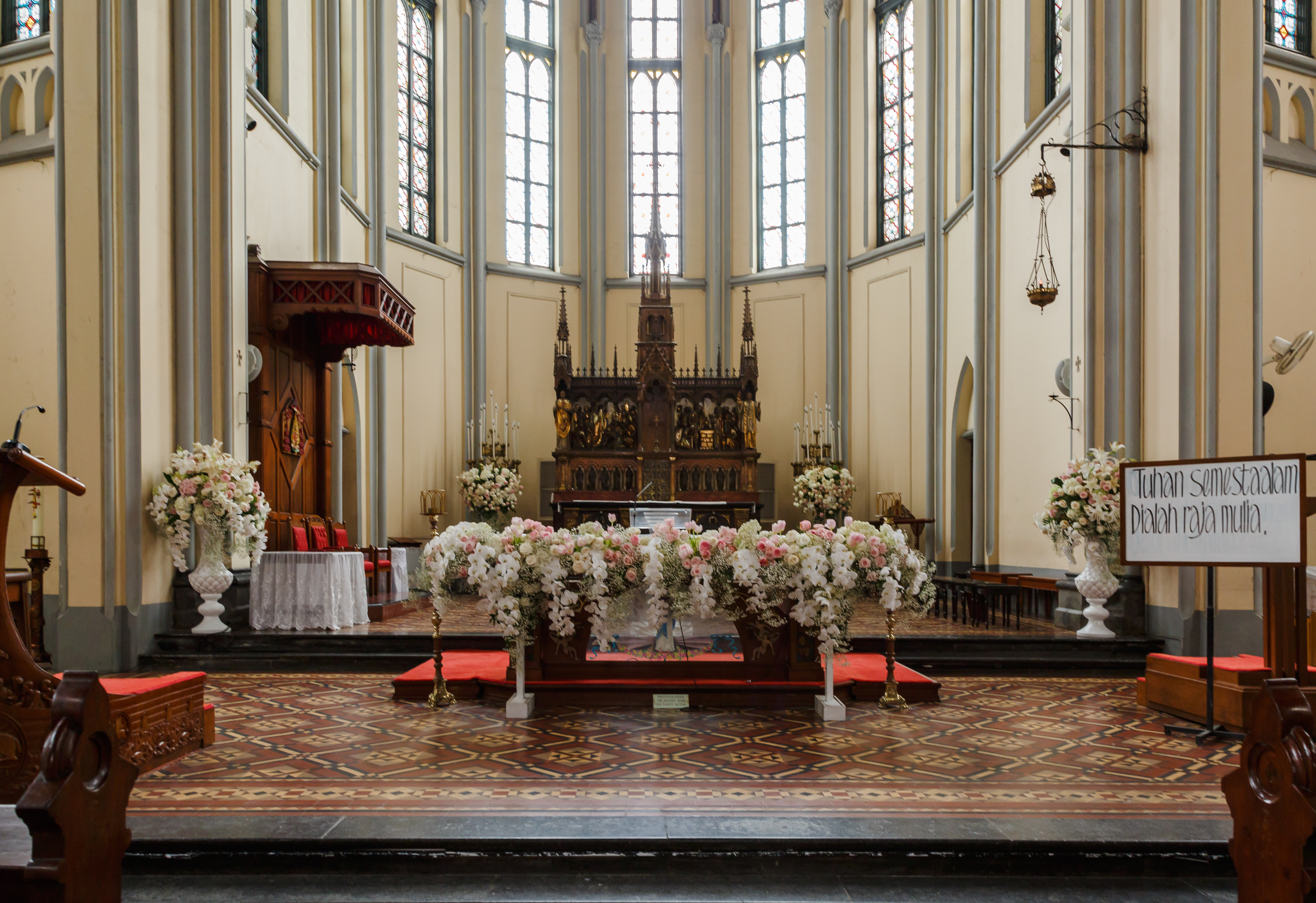
Altar

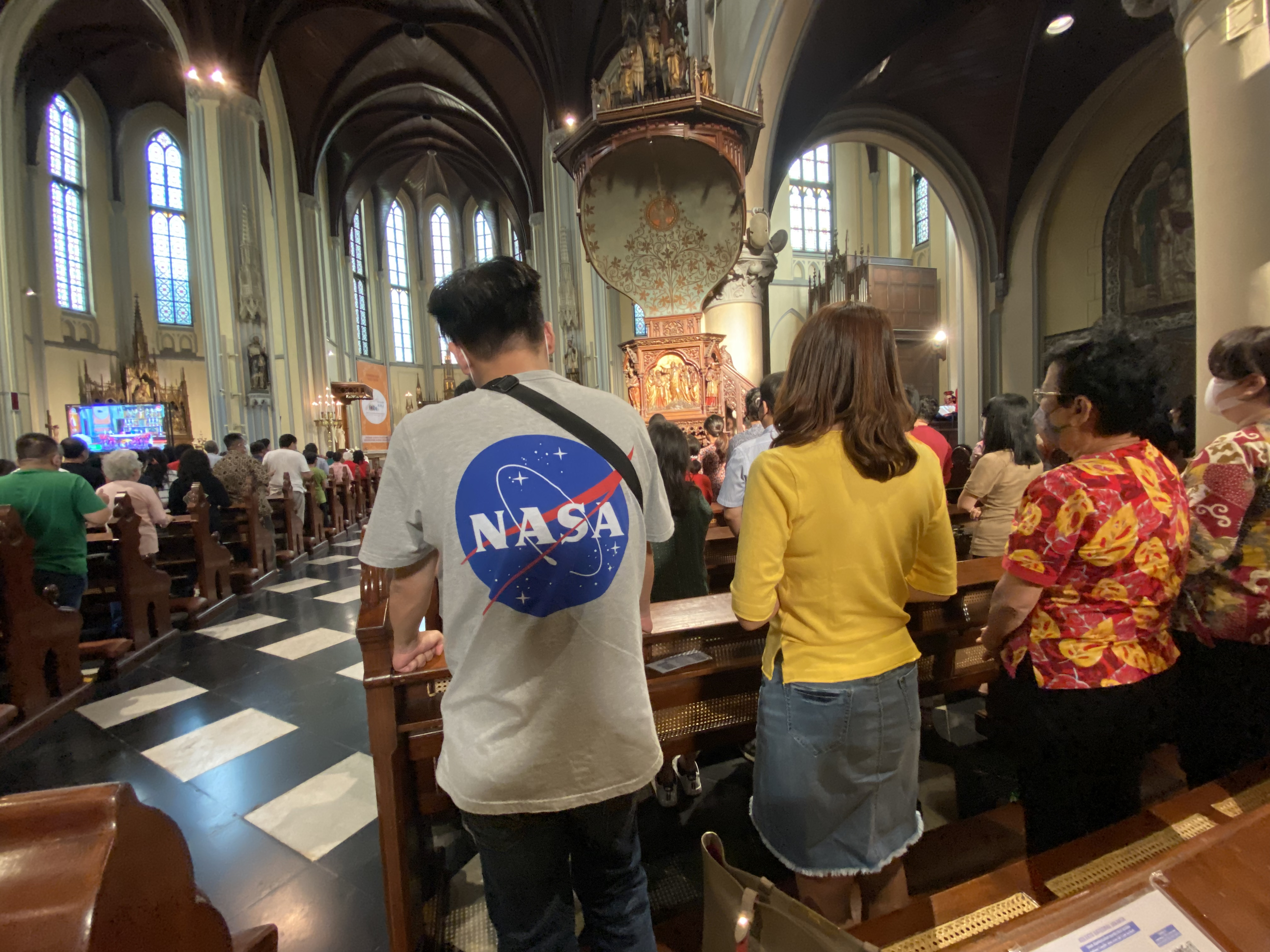
The cathedral during mass

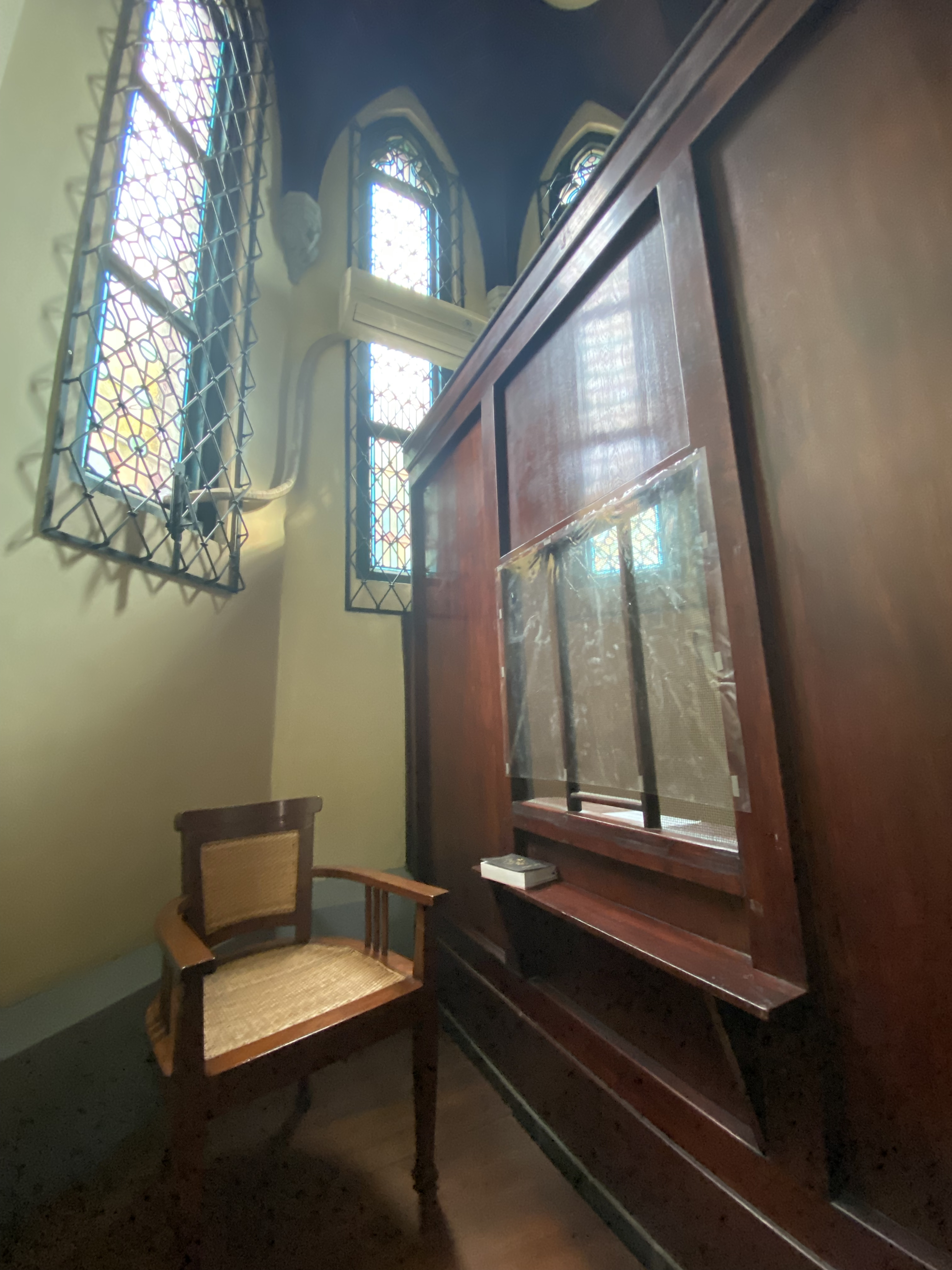
A confessional room

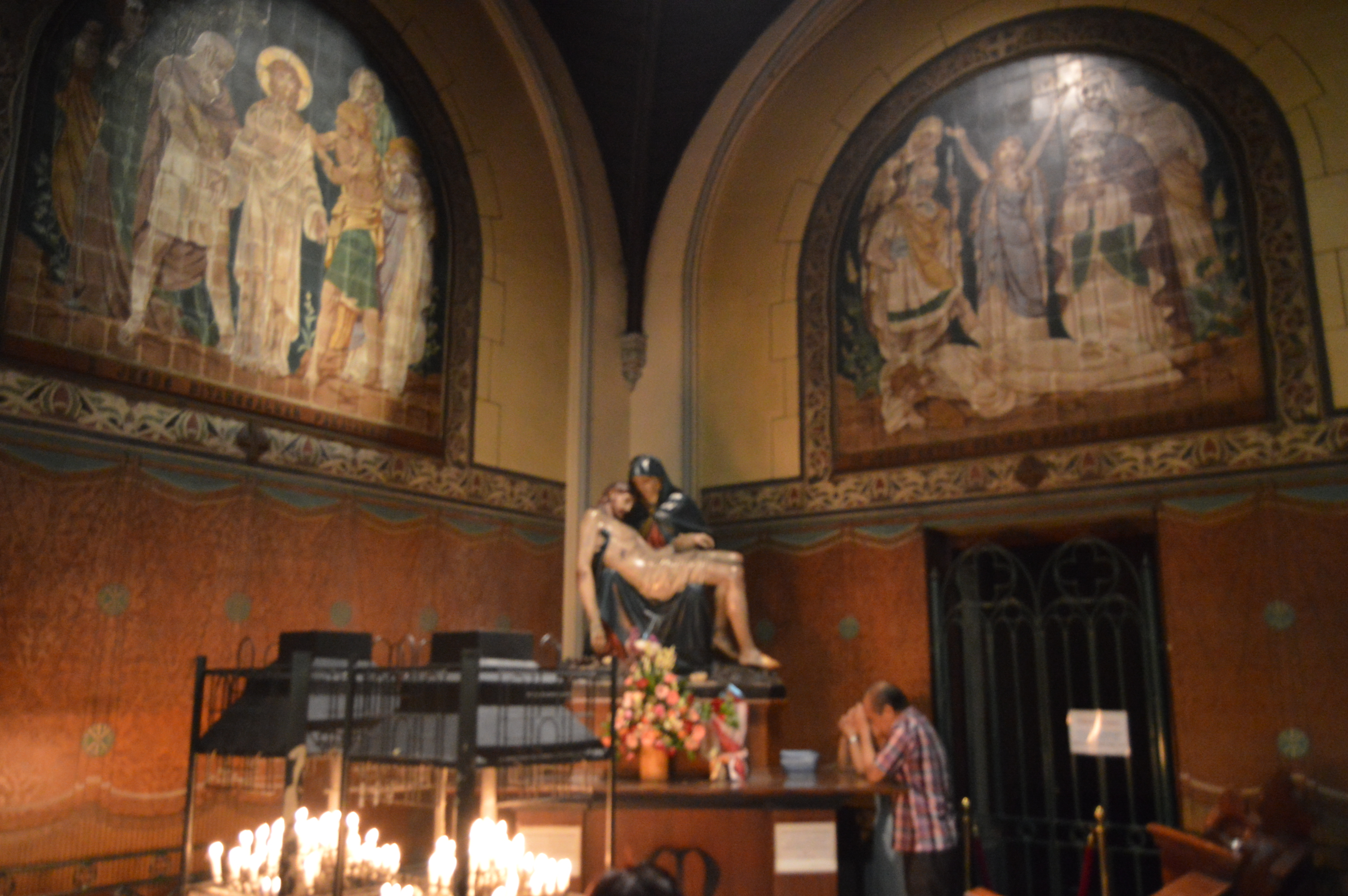
Jakarta Cathedral Pietà

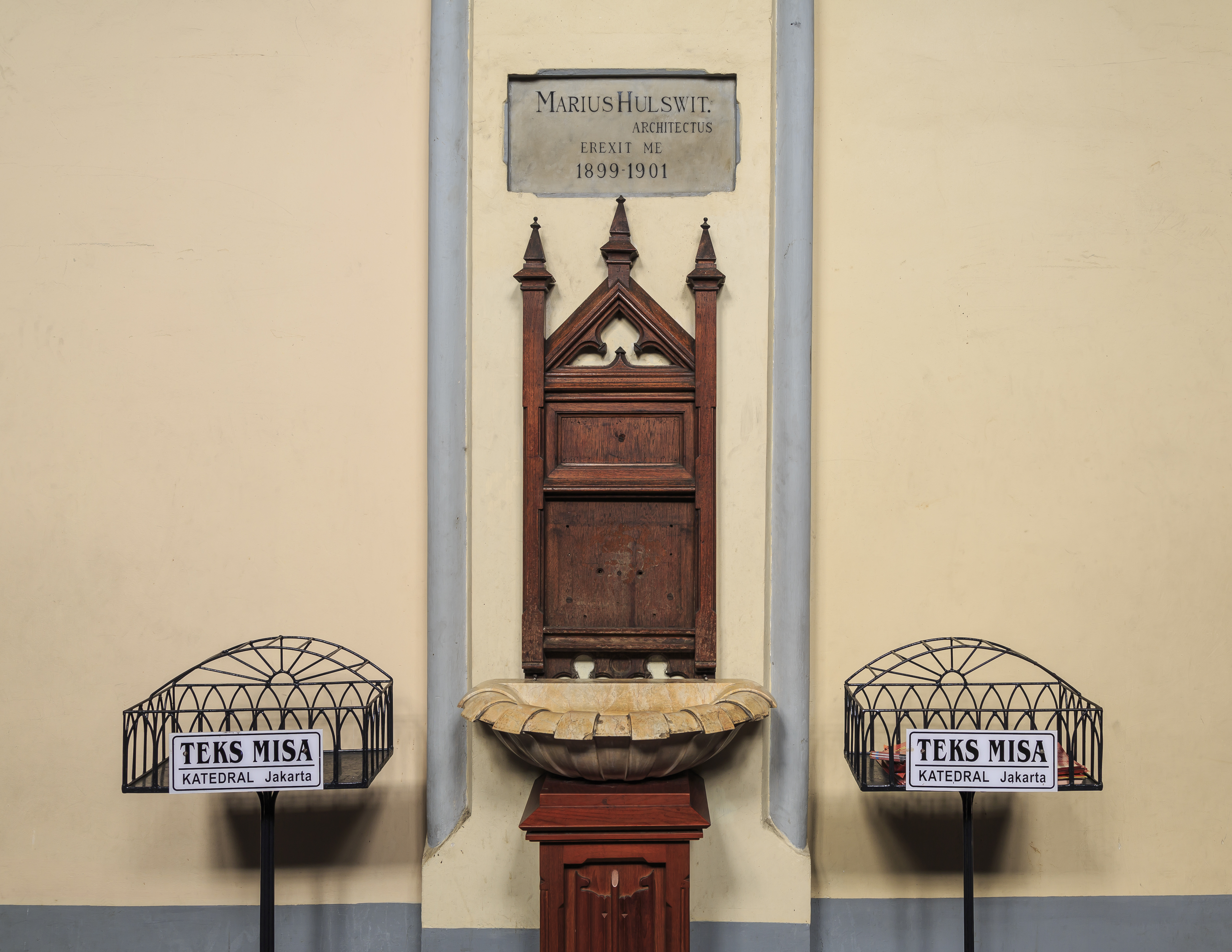
The stoup of the cathedral, with a memorial stone to Marius Hulswit

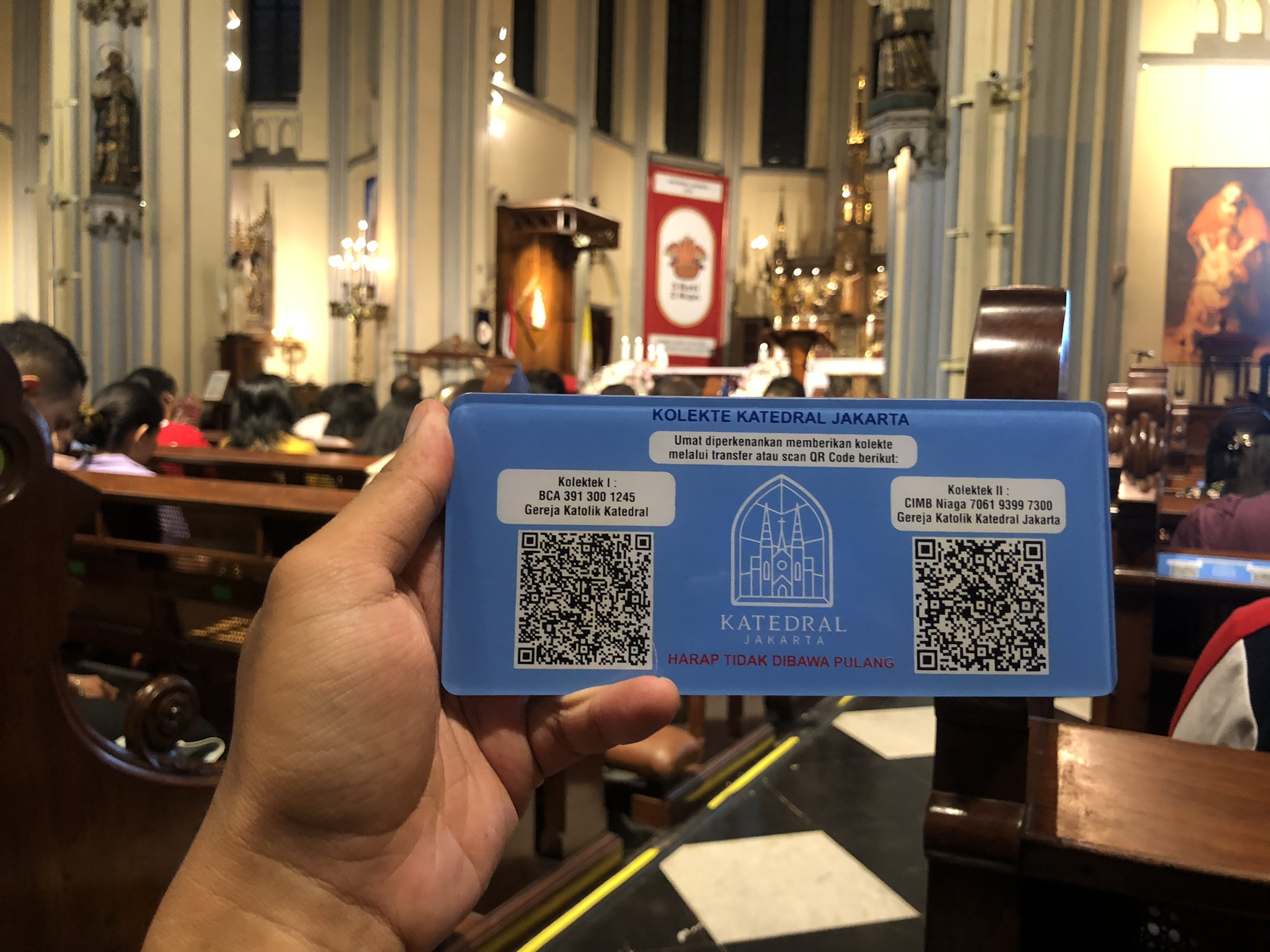
Donation collection using QR Code technology, which has been used since the Coronavirus pandemic.

== See also ==
- List of church buildings in Indonesia
- List of colonial buildings and structures in Jakarta
- Christianity in Indonesia
- Catholic Church in Indonesia
- Tunnel of Friendship
