= Gambir, Jakarta =

District in Central Jakarta, Indonesia

Coordinates: 6.175°S 106.825°E

Gambir Weltevreden
- District
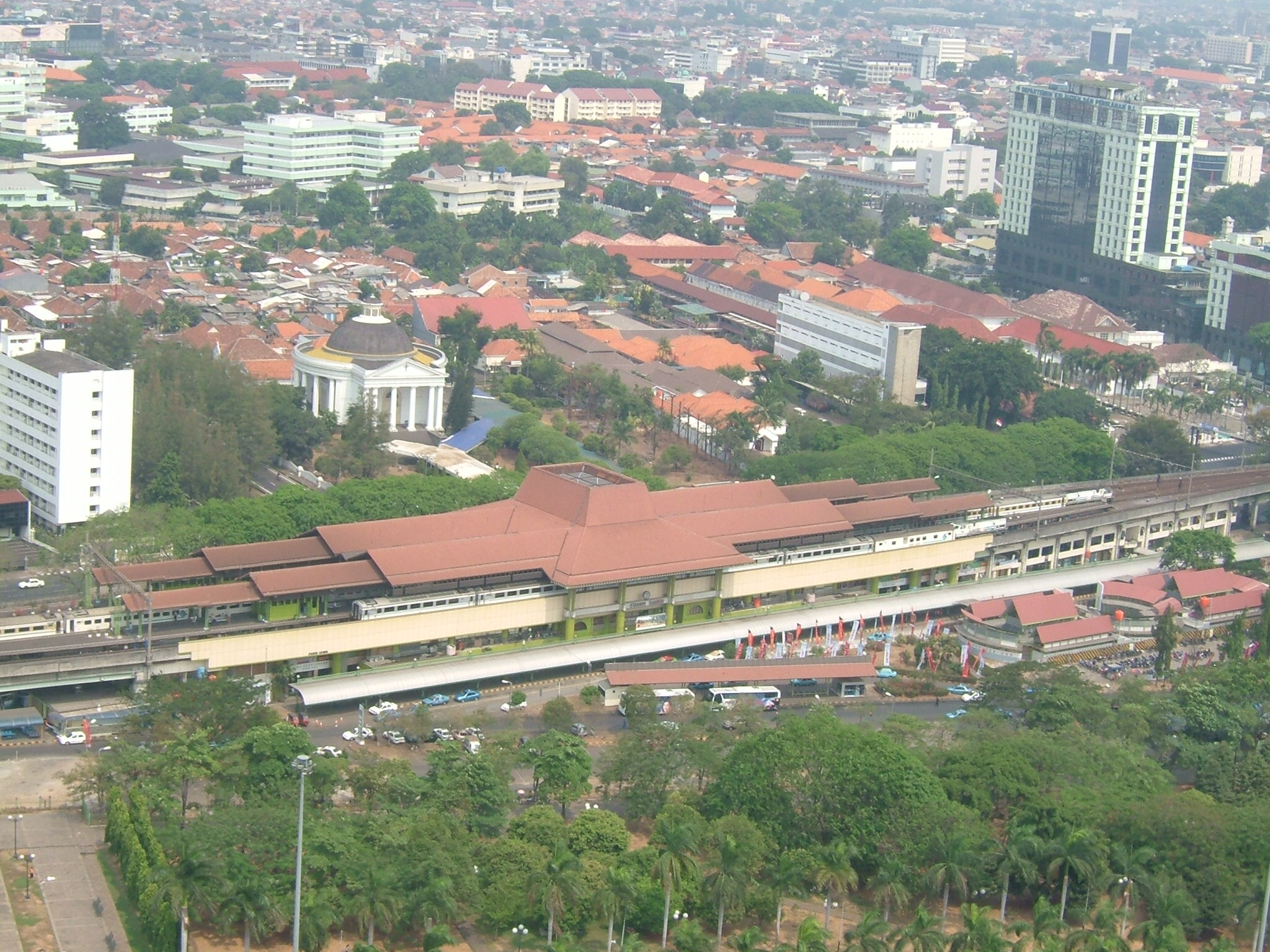
- Gambir railway station and Immanuel Church are located in the eastern edge of Gambir.
- Interactive map of Gambir
- Country: Indonesia
- Province: Jakarta
- Administrative city: Central Jakarta

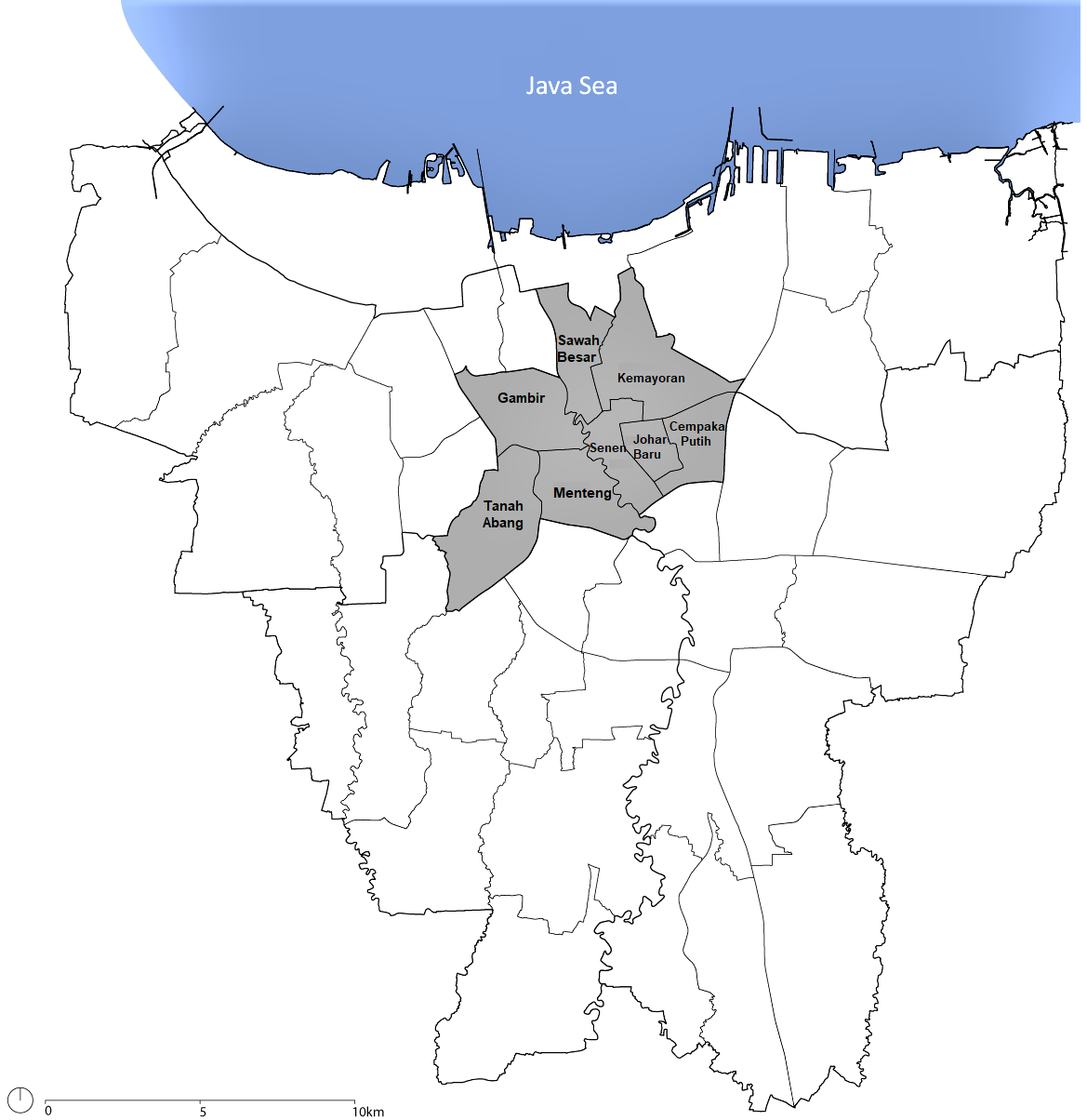
Map of the district and others. Click for broader map and to enable varied magnification.

Gambir is a district (Indonesian: kecamatan) in the administrative city of Central Jakarta, Indonesia. It is characterized by many historic buildings from the colonial era. It hosts some of the foremost political and learning/tourism features of the capital. The Merdeka Palace (the presidential palace of Indonesia), the National Museum, the headquarters of the Indonesian Scout Movement and the Merdeka Square (in which stands the National Monument) are among these.

One of the busiest railway stations, Gambir Station, is in the focal Gambir neighbourhood (an underlying Administrative Village as the translation is usually rendered) of the district. The City Hall of Central Jakarta is in Petojo Selatan here.

== Limits ==
Gambir is bordered by the Jakarta Flood Canal to the west, the river Ciliwung to the east, KH Zainul Arifin and Sukarjo Wiryopranoto Road to the north, and Kebon Sirih Raya Road to the south.

== Toponym ==
The name Gambir is taken from the name of a Dutch lieutenant of French descent named Gambier, the lieutenant whom Daendels assigned to pave the way to the south.

== History ==
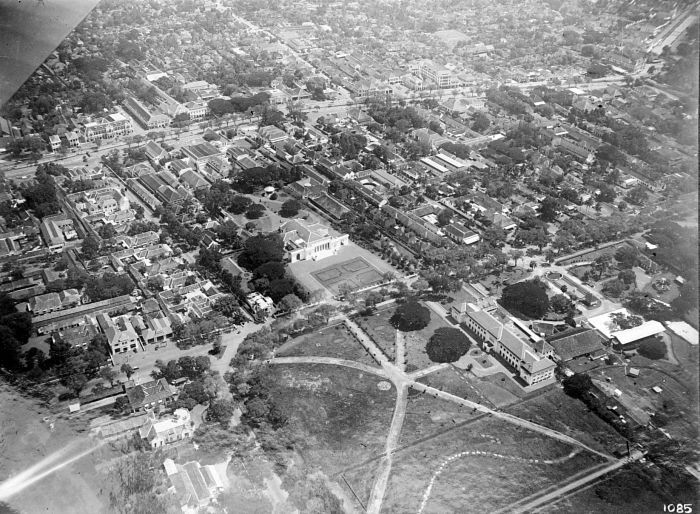
An aerial picture of the northeast corner of Koningsplein showing the palace of the governor-general which is now the Merdeka Palace

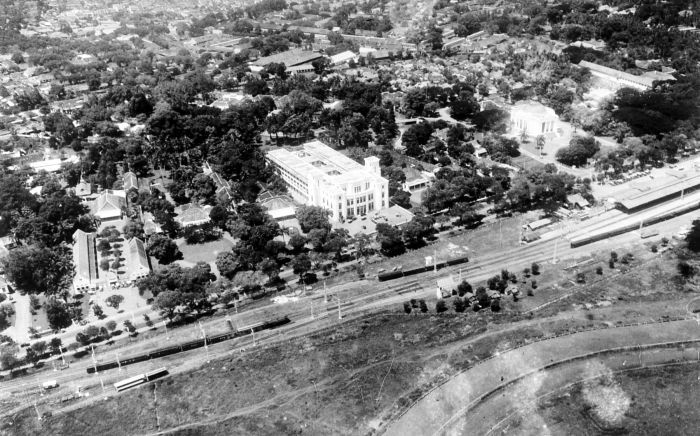
An aerial picture of the Gambir station during colonial era

The area that is now Gambir District was originally a southern hinterland of Batavia with marshes and known for the gambier plant. A kampung settlement existed under the name Kampung Gambir. In the 18th century, a landowner known as Anthony Paviljoen began to develop the area and later rented them to Chinese people who further developed the land as an agricultural land.

When old Batavia (Jakarta) on the shore was abandoned save for its port aspects in favor of the healthier and cleaner southern neighborhood, the Gambir area was gradually urbanized and developed. During the government of Daendels, the center of administration was moved from the old Batavia to Gambir area. The area became widely known as Weltevreden until 1931, after which it officially became Batavia Centrum (Central Batavia).

The area around the large field was characteristically surrounded with colonial buildings, mansions, and other civic facilities. Some of these buildings are restored and have become landmarks of Jakarta, such as the Willemskerk (now the Immanuel Church) and The Batavian Society of Arts and Science (now the National Museum).

== Kelurahan (Administrative Villages) ==
The district of Gambir is divided into six kelurahan or administrative villages:

- Gambir - area code 10110
- Kebon Kelapa - area code 10120
- Petojo Selatan - area code 10130
- Duri Pulo - area code 10140
- Cideng - area code 10150
- Petojo Utara - area code 10160

== List of important places ==
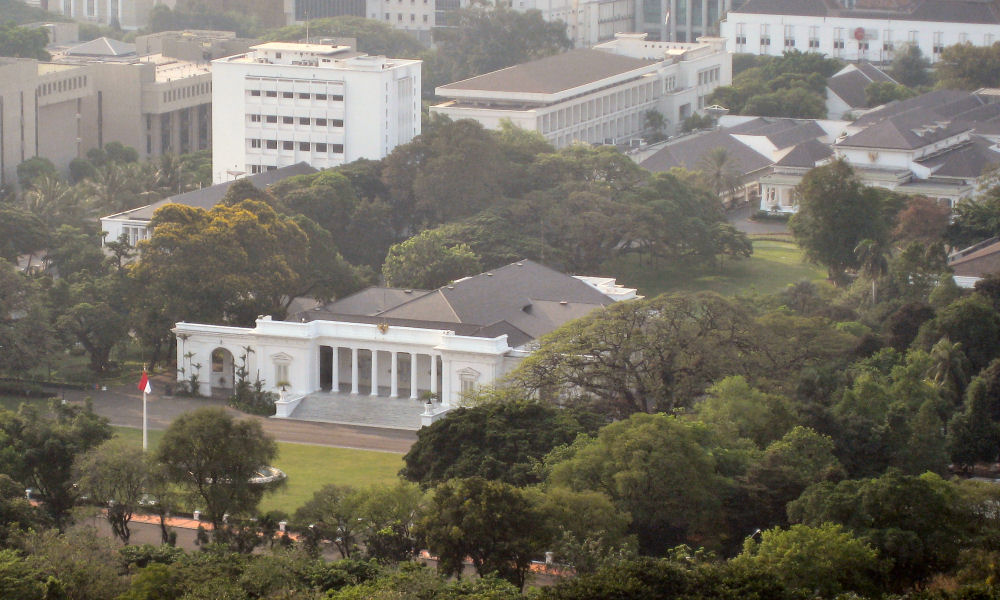
Merdeka Palace

- City Hall of Central Jakarta
- Gambir Station
- Governor Office of DKI Jakarta
- Immanuel Church
- Merdeka Palace
- Merdeka Square
- Monas
- National Gallery
- National Museum
- Taman Prasasti Museum

== Cited works ==
- Merrillees, Scott (2015). Jakarta: Portraits of a Capital 1950-1980. Jakarta: Equinox Publishing. ISBN 9786028397308.
