= Tunnel of Friendship =

Tunnel in Jakarta, Indonesia

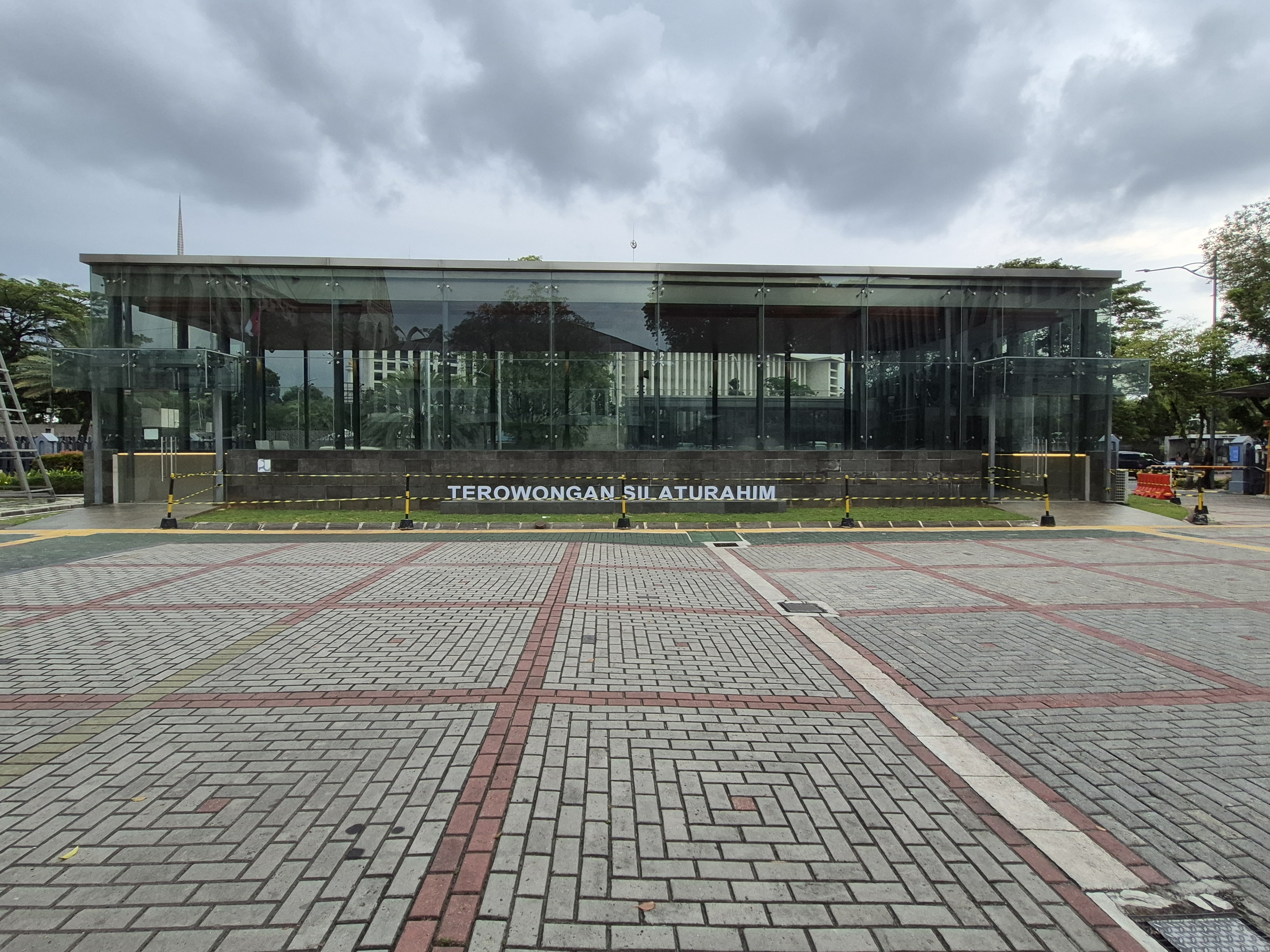
Tunnel of Friendship between Jakarta Cathedral and Istiqlal Mosque

Tunnel of Friendship, or Tunnel of Silaturahmi (Terowongan Silaturahmi) is an underground tunnel connecting the interior of Istiqlal Mosque and St. Mary of the Assumption Cathedral in Jakarta, Indonesia. The tunnel was constructed as part of the plan to renovate the mosque, and the construction was started on 15 December 2020. It took around 10 months to be finished and was finished in September 2021.

The tunnel has length of 28.3 meters, height of 3 meters, and width of 4.1 meters. The tunnel's interior is shaped based on handshake gesture. Other than symbolizing religious tolerance, the tunnel was intended to relieve two worship places from parking problem during religious holidays and events, as it make attendance of both mosque and cathedral can use each other's parking area. Total area of the tunnel is 226 square meter including shelter, and was built with budget of Rp 37.3 billions by Indonesian government.

In 2024, the planned tunnel connecting the church with the mosque was visited by the world's Catholic church leader, Pope Francis.

== Controversy ==
The tunnel construction was rejected by several Islamic conservative figures, as well as politicians and public figure. Vice chief of Indonesian Ulema Council Tengku Zulkarnain called the project "waste of money" and that government has better things to spend on. Ferdinand Hutahean, politician from Democratic Party called the project as gimmick and will not solve problem of religious intolerance in Indonesia. Chief of Nahdlatul Ulama, Said Aqil Siradj commented on the project saying that it is devoid of religious, cultural, political, or social meaning and deemed not important. General secretary of Muhammadiyah, Abdul Mut'i criticized the tunnel, stating to build tolerance is not using physical infrastructure but social one. Academicians, moderate religious figures, and activists said that the tunnel will not have any effect nor solve rising religious intolerance in Indonesia, while Islamist figures and ulemas condemned the construction as promoting religious pluralism which they reject.
