= Nasaruddin Umar =

Indonesian Islamic scholar and politician (born 1959)

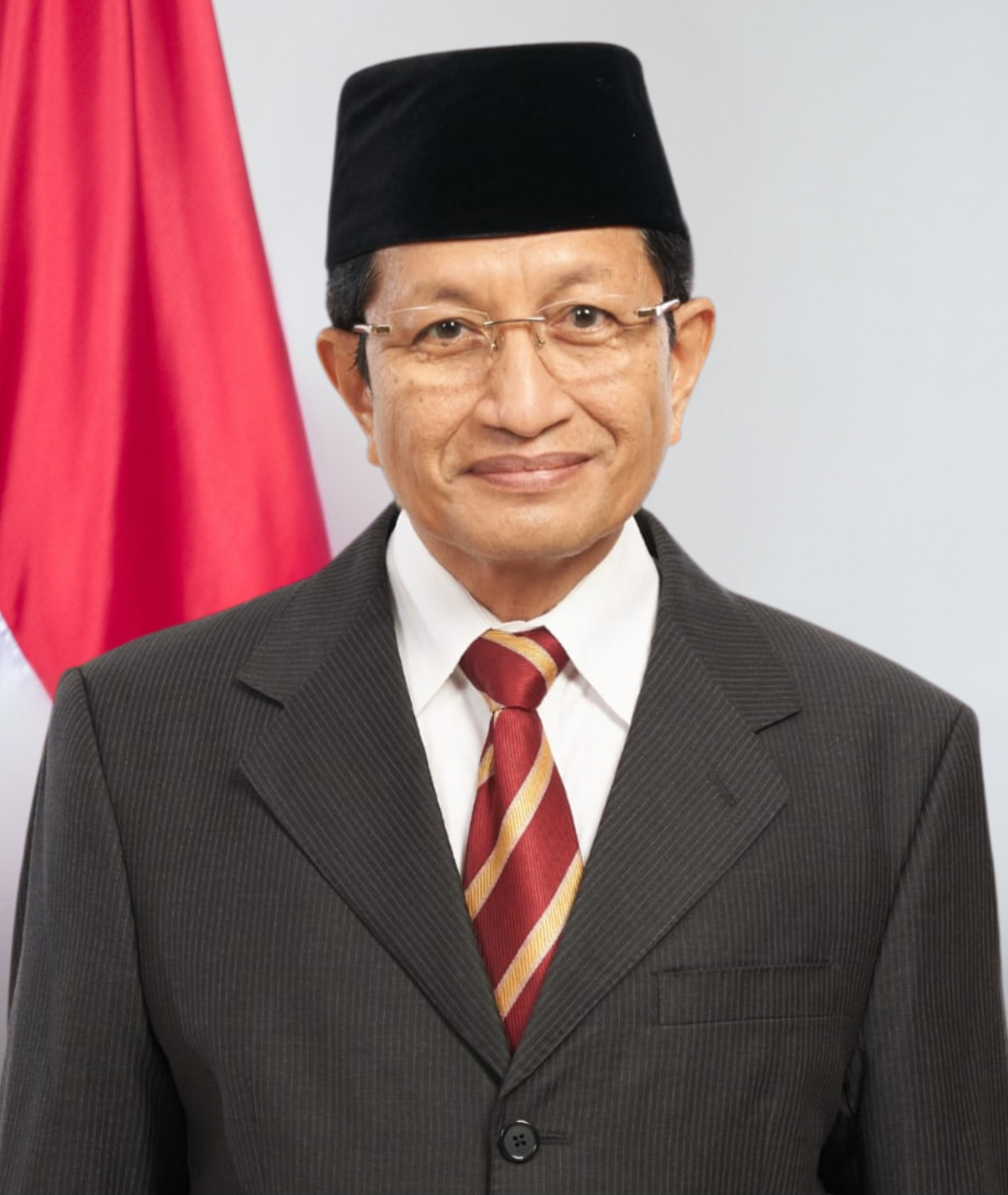
- Official portrait, 2024

25th Minister of Religious Affairs
- Incumbent
- Assumed office 21 October 2024
- President: Prabowo Subianto
- Deputy: Muhammad Syafi'i
- Preceded by: Yaqut Cholil Qoumas

5th Grand Imam of Istiqlal Mosque
- Incumbent
- Assumed office 22 January 2016
- Preceded by: Ali Mustafa Yaqub

2nd Vice Minister of Religious Affairs
- In office 2011–2014
- President: Susilo Bambang Yudhoyono
- Vice President: Boediono
- Preceded by: Fatah Jasin
- Succeeded by: Zainut Tauhid Sa'adi

Personal details
- Born: 23 June 1959 (age 67) Bone Regency, South Sulawesi, Indonesia
- Spouse: Dra. Helmi Halimatul Udhma (m. 1996)
- Education: Alauddin Islamic State University; Syarif Hidayatullah State Islamic University Jakarta; McGill University; Sorbonne University; Leiden University
- Profession: Islamic scholar
- Awards: Star of Mahaputera (2014)

Nasaruddin Umar (born 23 June 1959) is an Indonesian Islamic scholar and politician who is currently serving as Minister for Religious Affairs, the grand Imam of the Istiqlal Mosque, founder of the Indonesian interfaith organization Masyarakat Dialog antar Umat Beragama and was vice minister (2011–2014) in the Indonesian Ministry of Religious Affairs. He is also a member of the UK-Indonesia Advisory Team, founded by UK prime minister Tony Blair.

He is the author of 12 books, among them: Argumen Kesetaraan Gender Perspektif Al-Quran (Paramadina, 1999), which examines gender bias in the Quran.

== Early life ==
Nasaruddin Umar was born to Andi Muhammad Umar and Andi Bunga Tungke. His father, Andi Muhammad Umar, was only formally elementary school graduate, but learned religion very well from local South Sulawesi ulamas. His father was a hard labor at Surabaya harbors before eventually settled back to found South Sulawesi Branch Office of Ansor.

Nasaruddin Umar graduated from Alauddin Islamic State Institute, obtaining his baccalaureate (1980) and bachelor's degree (1984) in Islamic religious studies. He did his postgraduate studies at Syarif Hidayatullah State Islamic University, Jakarta resulting is a Magister degree (1992), and a doctorate (1998).

During his doctorate studies, he was a visiting student for a PhD Program at McGill University, Montreal, Canada (1993–1994), and a visiting student for a PhD Program at Leiden University, Netherlands (1994–1995).

After achieving his doctorate, he was a visiting scholar at Sopia University, Tokyo (2001), a visiting scholar at SOAS University of London (2001–2002), and a visiting Scholar at Georgetown University, Washington DC (2003–2004).

== Careers ==
As lecturer, he taught at state-run State Hidayatullah State Islamic University and Nahdlatul Ulama-affiliated Quranic Higher Education Institute (Institute of Quranic Sciences, PTIQ, now PTIQ University). He had appointed as Tafsir Professor for State Hidayatullah State Islamic University in 2002. He also a rector of PTIQ since 2005 and had continuously elected since then, lastly in 2026, to be serving as PTIQ rector for 2026-2031 period, making him the first PTIQ rector that served concurrently as Grand Imam of Istiqlal Mosque and Minister Religious Affairs.

== Personal life ==
He married with Helmi Halimatul Udhma in 1996 and had 3 children, Andi Nizar Nasaruddin Umar, Andi Rizal Nasaruddin Umar, and Cantik Najda Nasaruddin Umar.
