= Protestant Church in Western Indonesia =

Protestant Church in Indonesia

- Gereja Protestan di Indonesia bagian Barat (Indonesian); De Protestantse Kerk in Westelijk Indonesië (Dutch)
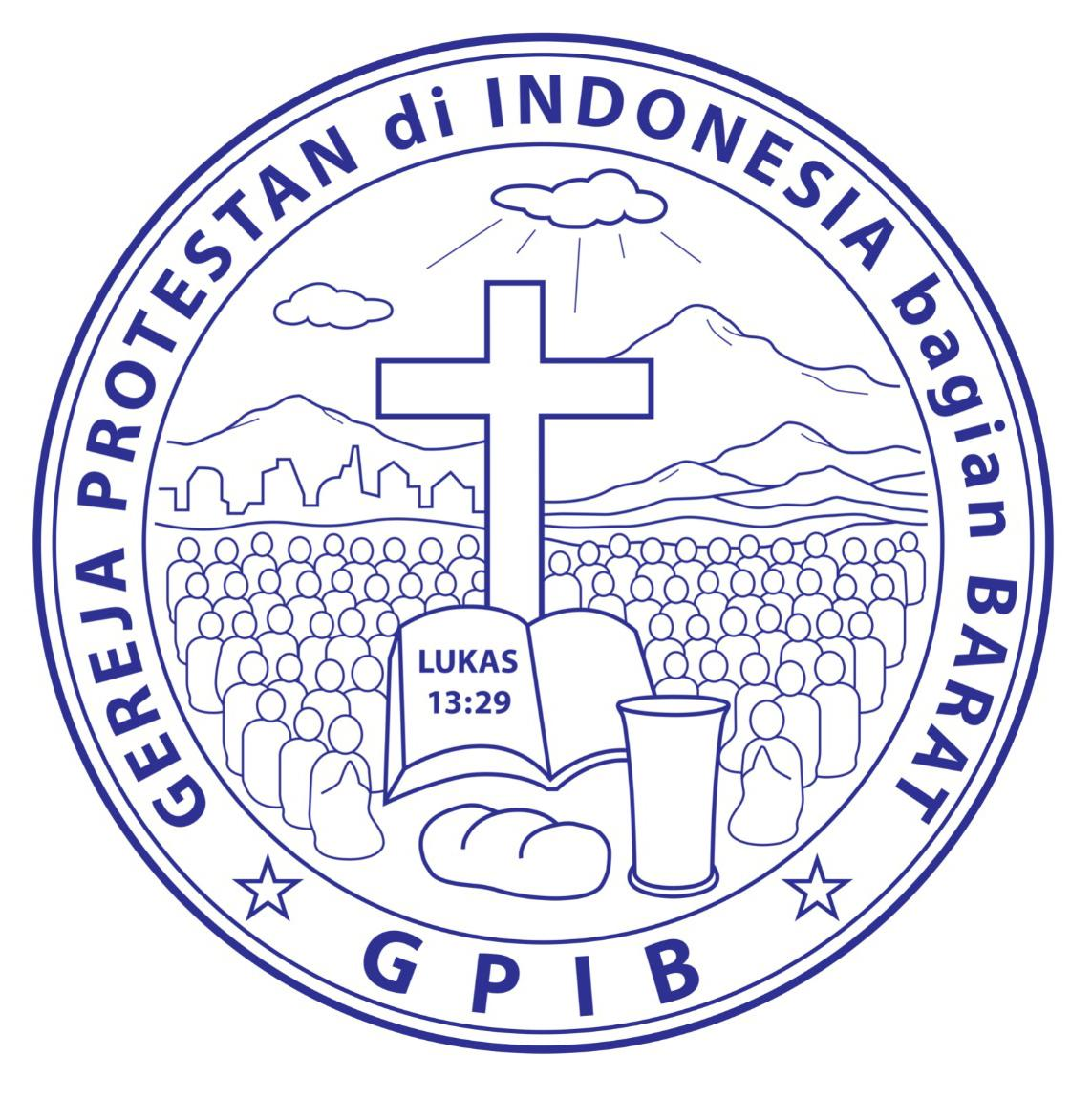
- Logo of the Protestant Church of Western Indonesia
- Abbreviation: GPIB
- Classification: Protestantism
- Scripture: Bible
- Theology: Reformed
- Polity: Presbyterian
- Chairperson: Rev. Nitis P. Harsono, M.Th.
- General Secretary: Rev. Ebser M. Lalenoh, M.Th.
- Full communion: Protestant Church in Indonesia
- Associations: Communion of Churches in Indonesia; Christian Conference of Asia; World Council of Churches; World Communion of Reformed Churches
- Region: Indonesia
- Language: Indonesian; Dutch (in some occasions)
- Headquarters: 10 Medan Merdeka Street, Central Jakarta, Jakarta
- Origin: 31st October 1948
- Branched from: Protestant Church in Indonesia
- Official website: https://gpib.or.id/
- Slogan: “And they shall come from the east, and from the west, and from the north, and from the south, and shall sit down in the kingdom of God.” (Luke 13:29)

The Protestant Church in Western Indonesia (Indonesian: Gereja Protestan di Indonesia bagian Barat, abbreviated as GPIB) is a Reformed Church, and its theology is based on the teaching of John Calvin. It was established on 31 October 1948. It was called the "De Protestantse Kerk in Westelijk Indonesie", founded in 1605 in Ambon, Moluccas. In its formative years it consisted of seven classes: Jabar, Java, Jatim, Sumatra, Bangka, Borneo, Sulawesi. It is a member of the World Communion of Reformed Churches the World Council of Churches and the Christian Conference in Asia.

== Statistics ==
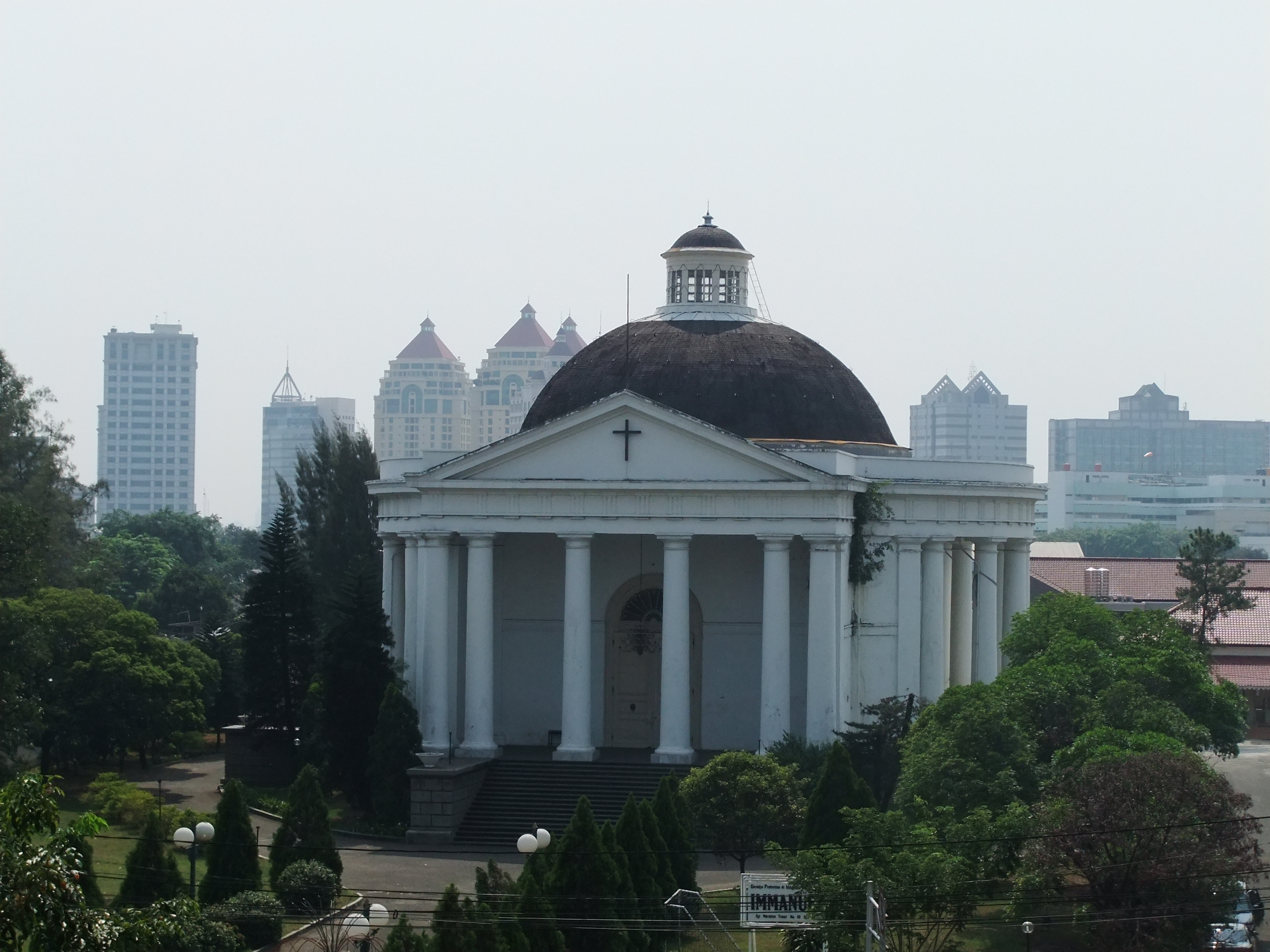
Immanuel Church, Jakarta

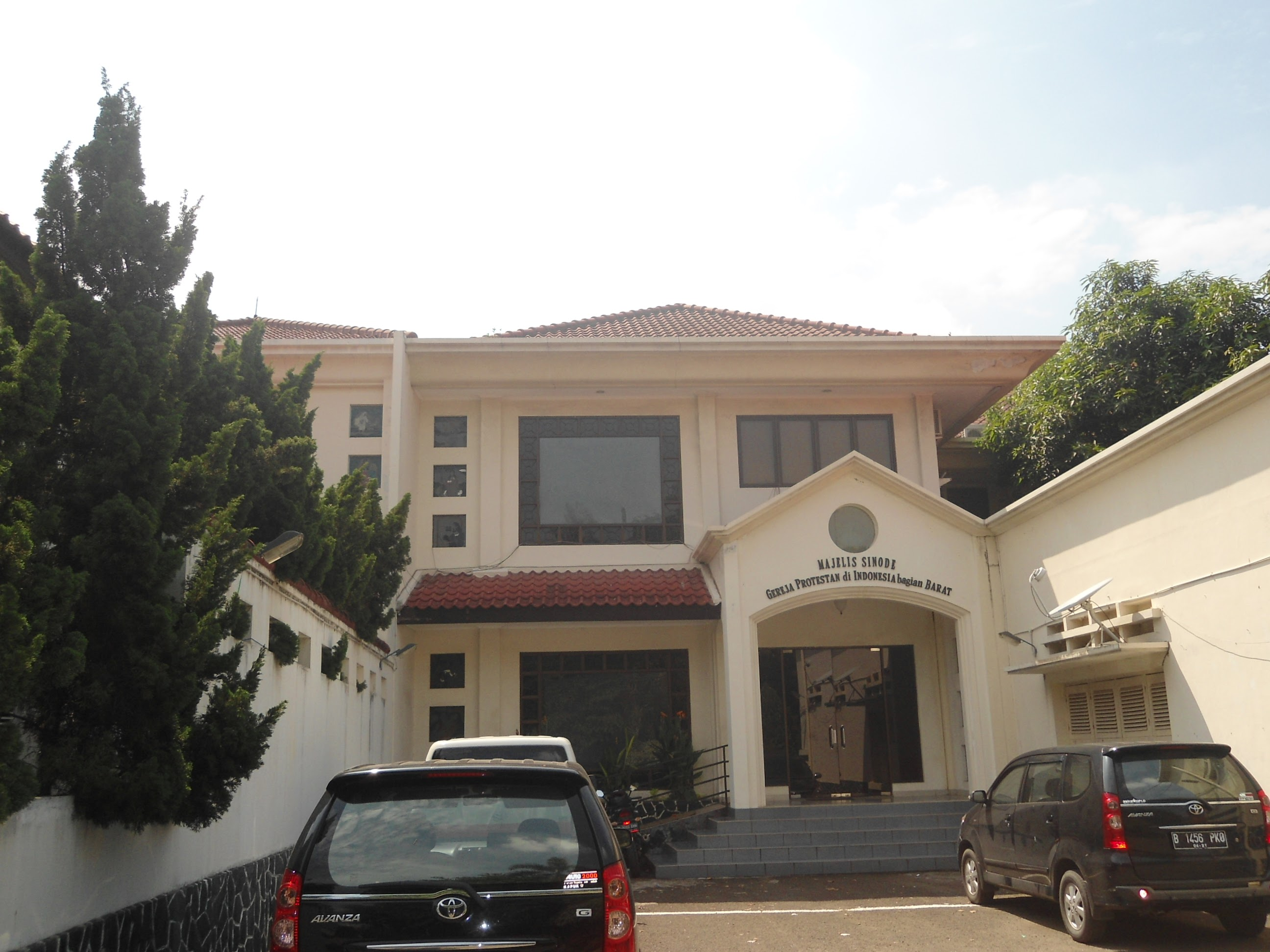
Protestant Church in Western Indonesia Synod Office

The denomination has 600,000 members and 300 congregations and 430 pastors in 2006. It is a national multi-ethnic church, scattered over 25 out of the 32 provinces of Indonesia.

The denomination is one of the biggest Protestant churches in Indonesia and is part of the Protestant Church in Indonesia.

According to the recent statistics the church is growing rapidly, has 1,305,000 adherents and members. The Synod Office is located in Jakarta.
