= Immanuel Church, Jakarta =

Protestant church in Indonesia

Immanuel Church
- Gereja Immanuel Willemskerk
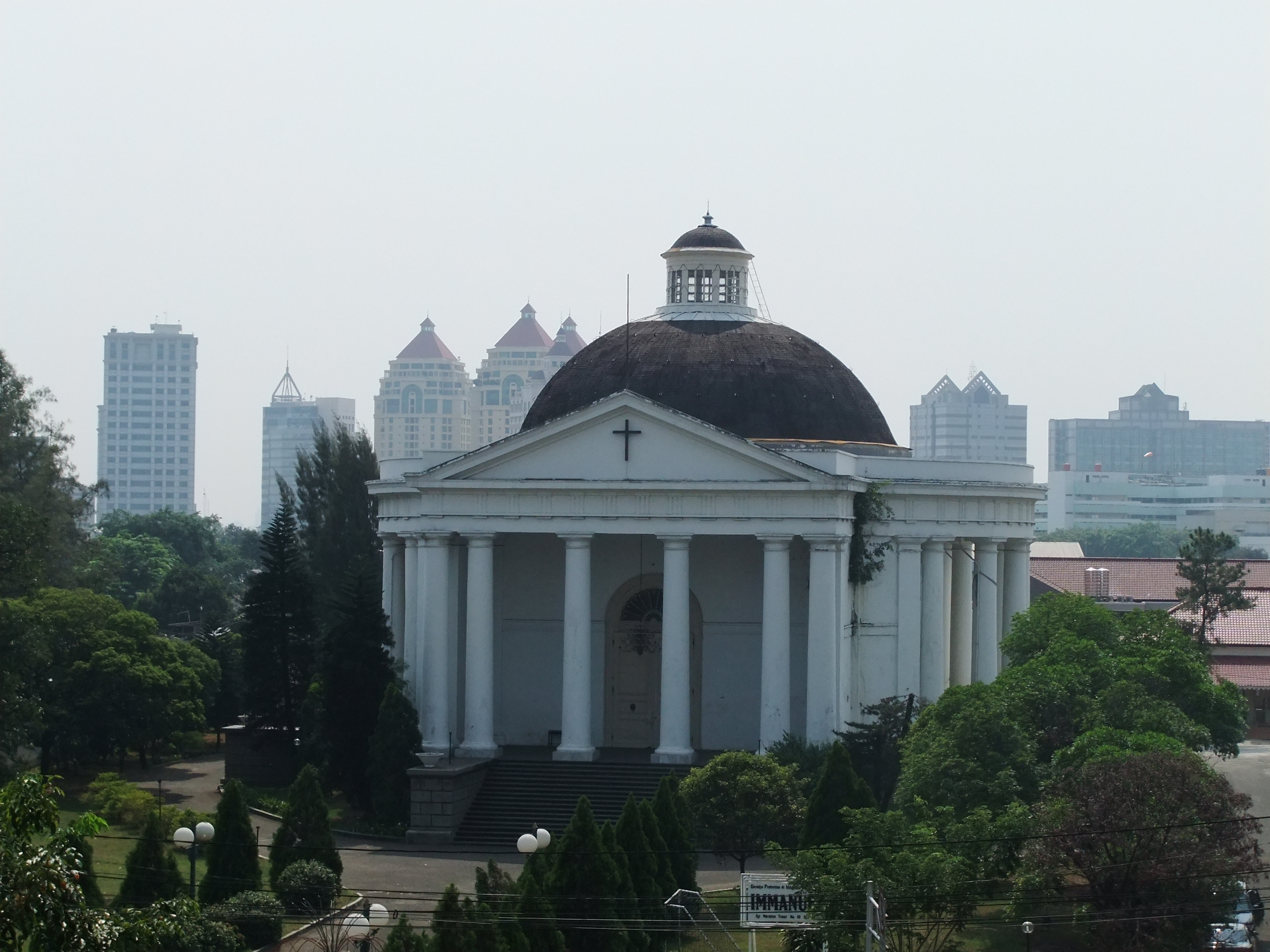
- Immanuel Church
- 6.17674°S 106.831999°E
- Location: Jakarta
- Country: Indonesia
- Denomination: Calvinist (Protestant Church in Western Indonesia)

History
- Former name: Willemskerk

Architecture
- Functional status: Active
- Architect: J.H. Horst
- Style: Indies Empire style
- Groundbreaking: 24 August 1835
- Completed: 24 August 1839

Immanuel's Church (Indonesian: Gereja Immanuel, Dutch: Willemskerk) is a Protestant church in Jakarta, Indonesia. It is considered one of the oldest churches in Indonesia. It stands on the corner of Jalan Medan Merdeka Timur and Jalan Pejambon, part of the 19th century's Weltevreden district, renamed and transformed into Gambir. The church is the only one in Jakarta that conducts some of its services in Dutch. It also performs services in Indonesian and English.

== History ==
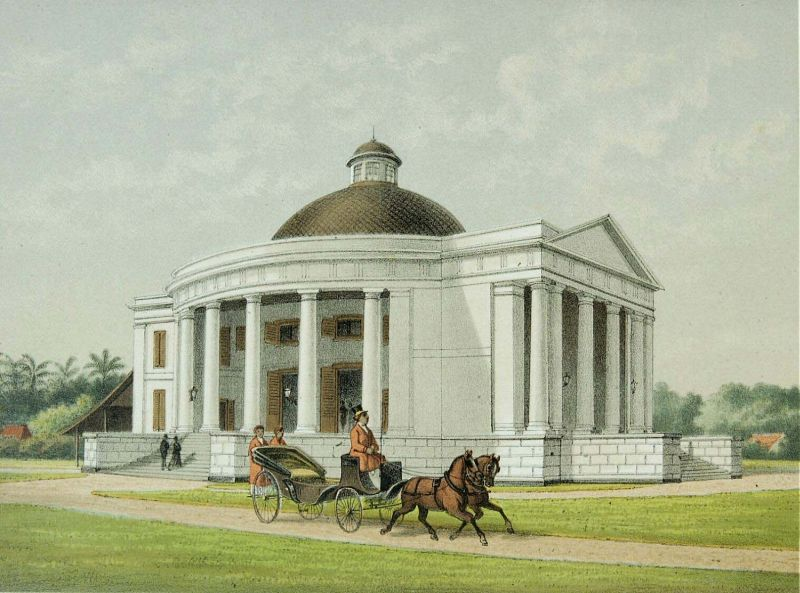
Late 19th-century lithograph of Immanuel's Church.

The first idea for the construction from the Dutch Reformists and the Lutherans in Batavia (Jakarta). Construction started in 1834, per the design of J.H. Horst. The laying of the first stone was on 24 August 1835 and completion exactly four years later. The Church was christened as Willemskerk to honour King William I of the Netherlands. It is considered one of the first civic building in the Koningsplein (later Merdeka Square).

In 1843, a Bätz organ was installed; it was restored in 1985.

The church also keeps a Dutch State Bible printed from 1748 by Nicolaas Goetzee of Gorinchem.

== Building ==
The all-brick church with stone columned and pedimented portico is built in Indies Empire style. It sits above a 3-meter foundation. The doors are of solid teak decorated with brass for handles and keyholes. It has a very broad dark grey-brown dome, surmounted by a white, panel-glazed, cupola topped by a miniature of the same dome in style and material. Other sides have more white pillars and tall white cornices, for the flat roof projections which are stone-clad, above.

The church has a circular layout with a diameter of 9.5 meters covered in grey marble tiles. Chairs are arranged circularly, with the state lectern used by the Governor of Batavia.

== See also ==
- List of church buildings in Indonesia
- History of Jakarta

== Works cited ==
- Afif Farhan (21 December 2011). "Gereja Immanuel, Warisan Batavia untuk Jakarta". Travel (in Indonesian). Jakarta.
- Aslendra, Rizki Putra (25 December 2019). "Melihat Gereja 3 Bahasa yang Masuk Cagar Budaya DKI". liputan6.com (in Indonesian). Archived from the original on 26 December 2019.
- Christie Damayanti (3 February 2012). "'Gereja Immanuel': Saksi Sejarah yang Cantik dari Hindia Belanda". Kompasiana (in Indonesian). Jakarta: Kompas. Archived from the original on 14 July 2014.
- Het Indische bouwen: architectuur en stedebouw in Indonesie : Dutch and Indisch architecture 1800-1950. Helmond: Gemeentemuseum Helmond. 1990.
- Sari, Nursita (25 December 2017). "Ibadah Berbahasa Belanda Hanya Ada di GPIB Immanuel Jakarta". KOMPAS.com (in Indonesian).
