= Cafe Batavia =

Restaurant in Jakarta Old Town

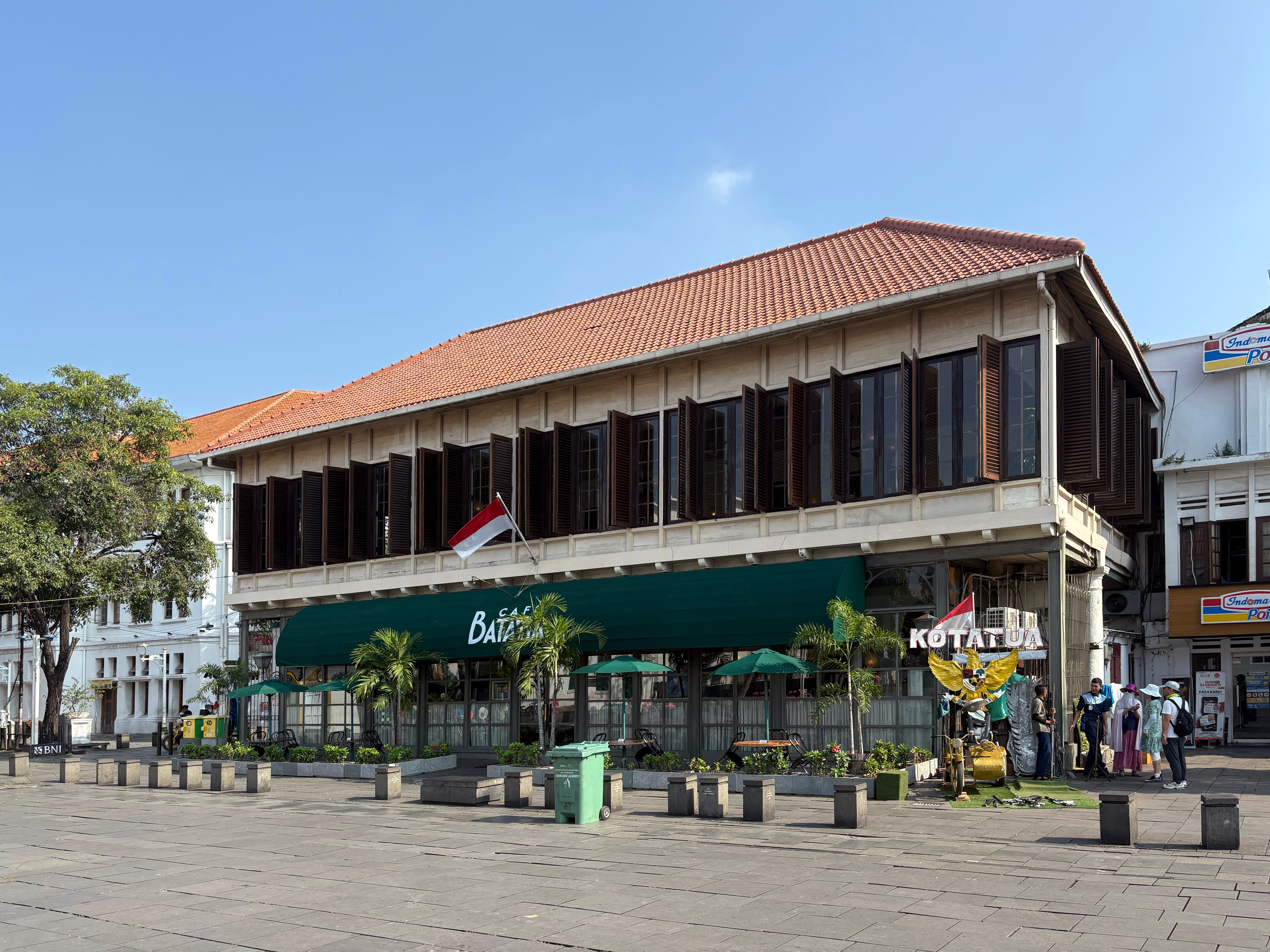
- Cafe Batavia as seen from the Fatahillah Square

- Location within Jakarta Location within Indonesia

General information
- Type: Restaurant
- Architectural style: Indies Empire style
- Location: Jakarta, Indonesia, Jalan Pintu Besar Utara
- Coordinates: 6°08′04″S 106°48′46″E
- Current tenants: Cafe Batavia
- Completed: 1837
- Owner: Eka Chandra

Design and construction
- Architect: anonymous

Cafe Batavia is a restaurant located in Kota Tua (Old Town), Jakarta, Indonesia. It is one of the colonial landmarks facing the square Taman Fatahillah. The building where Cafe Batavia is established is the second oldest building in the square, second only to the former City Hall building of Batavia, which had been reestablished as the Jakarta History Museum.

== Description ==
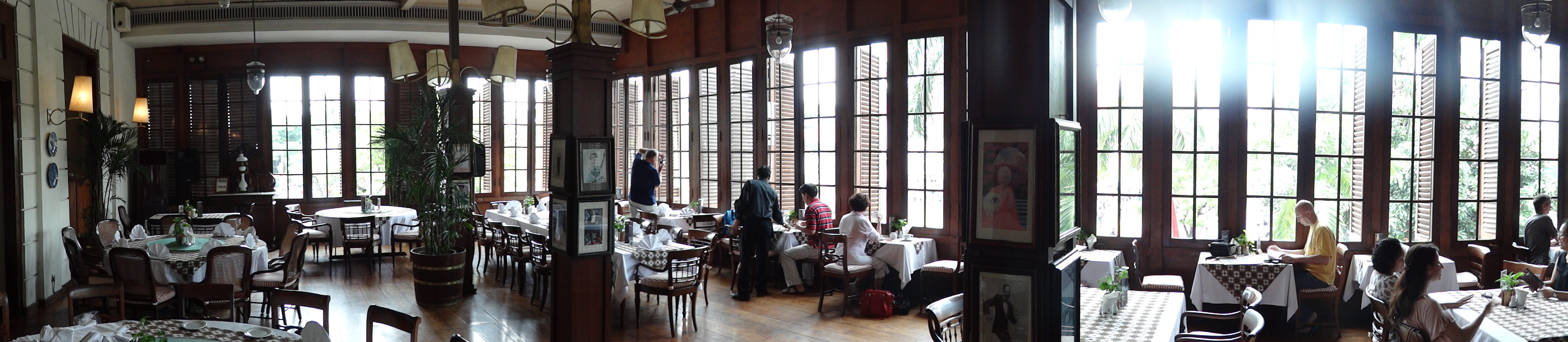
The Grand Salon of Cafe Batavia.

Cafe Batavia is located on the northwest corner of Taman Fatahillah. For many years, it was the only commercial premise in Taman Fatahillah. The restaurant was established in a two-storeyed 19th-century building. This type of building, typically with a wooden gallery on the second floor, was mostly constructed in the early 19th century. Some buildings of this type can still be found in other parts of Kota Tua, e.g. several buildings facing the Kali Besar. The building of Cafe Batavia was constructed in the 1830s. The original arcade below the gallery is enclosed by a glass panel, mainly to air condition the interior. A bar, a performance stage, and a lounge area are located on the ground floor. A staircase of Javanese teakwood leads to the upper floor.

The upper floor features the 'Grand Salon', the main dining hall which can hold 150 guests. The Grand Salon, which is the gallery part of the building, is constructed of wood and features large shuttered windows, providing abundant light into the interior as well as a view of Taman Fatahillah and the colonial buildings surrounding it. The so-called Winston Churchill bar of Cafe Batavia was named 'The World's Best Bar' by Newsweek International in 1996.

The interior of Cafe Batavia is furnished with a 1930s theme. Vintage photographs of 1930s celebrities and royalty decorate the main dining hall.

== History ==
The building of Cafe Batavia was constructed ca. the 1830s. It has been variously used as a residence, an office of the Dutch governors, and a warehouse. Paulo Gallery, an art gallery, was owned by Paul Hassan, a Frenchman and a close friend to the Indonesian Ministry of Education of that time Fuad Hassan.

In 1990, Australian citizen Graham James purchased the building, at which time it was the only freehold property in Taman Fatahillah. James restored the building over 1992 to 1993, and established a restaurant. The 19th-century interior was decorated with items inspired from the 1930s.

== See also ==
- List of colonial buildings and structures in Jakarta

== Cited works ==
- Figge, Katrin (November 20, 2009). "Cafe Batavia Remains a City Gem". Jakarta Globe. Jakarta Globe. Archived from the original on November 24, 2016.
- Merrillees, Scott (February 1, 2012). Greetings from Jakarta: Postcards of a Capital 1900-1950. Jakarta: Equinox Publishing. ISBN 9789793780887.
- Windoro Adi (2010). Batavia, 1740: menyisir jejak Betawi [Batavia, 1740: sweeping up the footsteps of Betawi] (in Indonesian). Jakarta: PT Gramedia Pustaka Utama. ISBN 9789792254518.
