= Kota Tua Jakarta =

Historic downtown of northwest Jakarta, Indonesia

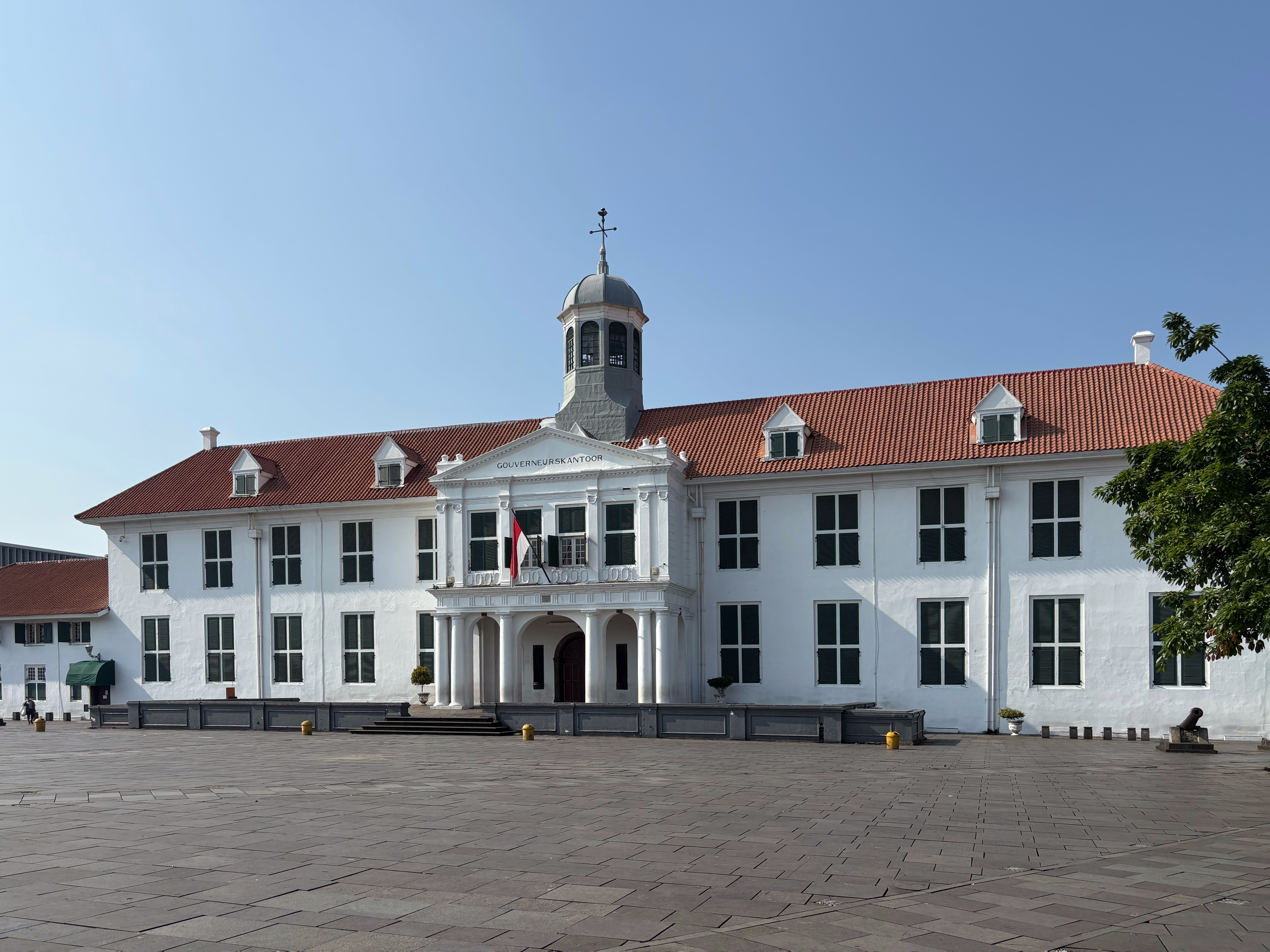
Jakarta History Museum, the current occupant of former town hall of 17th-century Batavia, the capital of Dutch East Indies and center of the Asian spice trade.

Kota Tua Jakarta (Indonesian for "Jakarta Old Town"), officially known as Kota Tua, is a neighbourhood comprising the original downtown area of Jakarta, Indonesia. It is also known as Oud Batavia (Dutch for "Old Batavia"), Benedenstad ("Lower City", contrasting it with Weltevreden, de Bovenstad ("Upper City")), or Kota Lama (Indonesian for "Old Town").

The site contains Dutch-style structures mostly dated from 17th century, when the port city served as the Asian headquarters of VOC during the heyday of spice trade. It spans 1.3 square kilometres within North Jakarta and West Jakarta (Kelurahan Pinangsia, Taman Sari and Kelurahan Roa Malaka, Tambora). The largely Chinese downtown area of Glodok is a part of Kota Tua.

== History ==
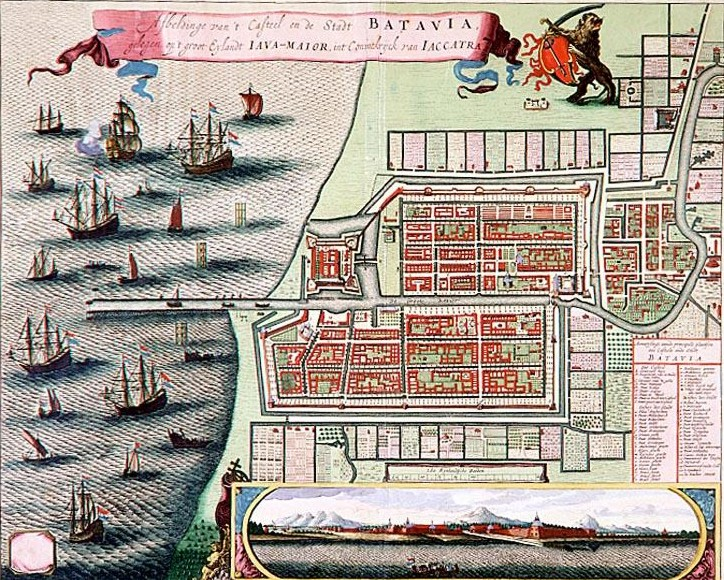
A map of Batavia in 1740. The area of Batavia within the city walls and moat as well as the Sunda Kelapa harbour to the left (north) of the map make up Jakarta Old Town.

Kota Tua is a remainder of Old Batavia, the first walled settlement of the Dutch in Jakarta area. It was an inner walled city with its own Castle. The area gained importance during the 17th-19th century when it was established as the de facto capital of the Dutch East Indies. This inner walled city contrasted with the surrounding kampung (villages), orchards, and rice fields. Dubbed "The Jewel of Asia" in the 16th century by European sailors, the area was a centre of commerce due to its strategic location within the spice trade industry in the archipelago.

=== Headquarters of the Dutch East India company ===
In 1526, Fatahillah, sent by Sultanate of Demak, invaded the Hindu Pajajaran's port of Sunda Kelapa, after which he renamed it into Jayakarta. This town was only 15 hectare in size and had a typical Javanese harbour layout. In 1619 the Dutch East India Company (VOC) destroyed Jayakarta under the command of Jan Pieterszoon Coen. A year later the VOC built a new town named "Batavia" after the Batavieren, the supposed Dutch ancestors from antiquity. This city was centred around the east bank of the Ciliwung river, around present day Fatahillah Square. Inhabitants of Batavia are called "Batavianen", later known as "Betawi" people. The creole citizens are descendants of mixed various ethnicities that had inhabited Batavia.

Around 1630 the city expanded towards the west banks of Ciliwung, on the ruins of former Jayakarta. The city was designed according to Dutch urban planning, complete with a fortress (Kasteel Batavia), city wall, public square, churches, canals and tree-lined streets. The city was arranged in several blocks separated by canals. No native Javanese were allowed to live within the city walls, since the authorities were afraid that they might start an insurrection. The planned city of Batavia was completed in 1650. It became the headquarters of the VOC in the East Indies and prospered from the spice trade.

=== Abandonment ===
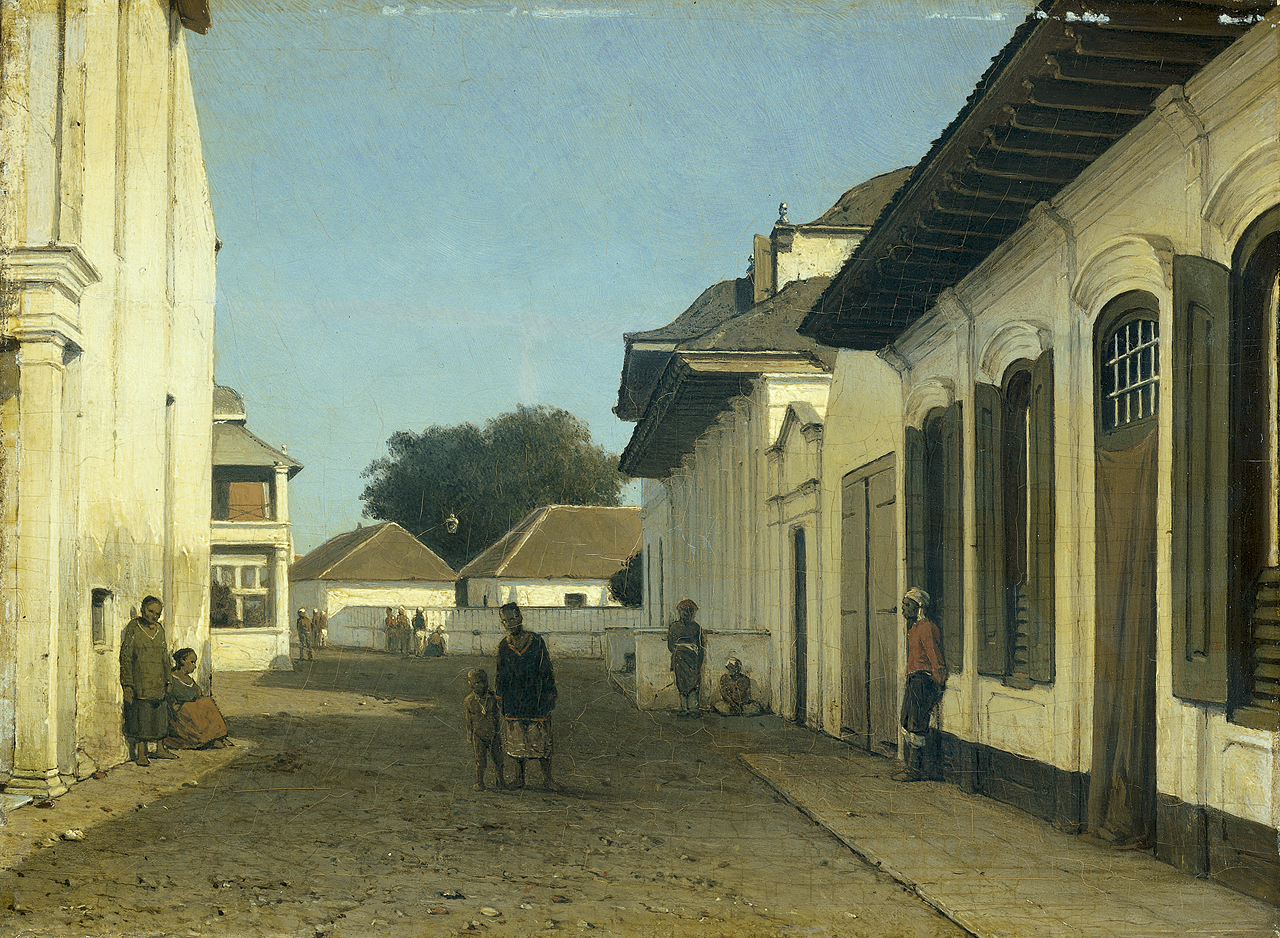
Declining city, in late 19th-century the walled Old Batavia has been reduced to kampung settlements and ruined old buildings.

Old Batavia declined in prominence in the late 18th century, probably because of the canals with their near-stagnant water, together with the warm and humid climate would often cause outbreaks of tropical diseases like malaria. Much of the old town became neglected and abandoned due to its decline of importance, and slowly its canals were filled up. Countryside villas were preferred by wealthier residents, which caused the city to grow southward. This process led to the foundation of an estate named Weltevreden.

=== As the capital of Dutch East Indies ===
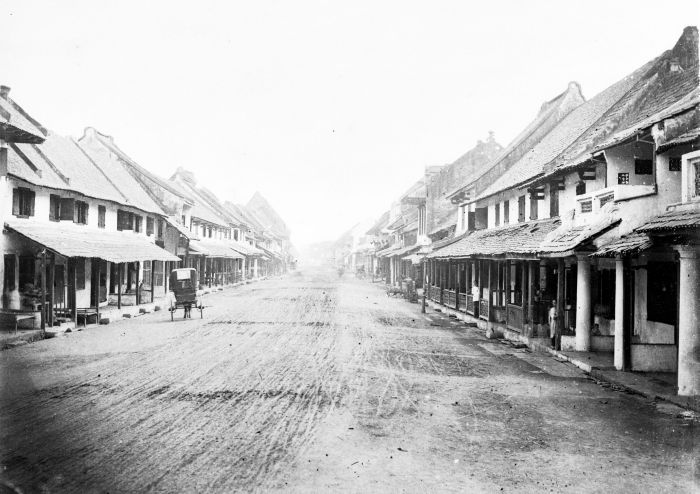
A street in Old Batavia in 1890, depicting 17th century housing before the development of a business district.

The city retained its status as the administrative center of the Dutch East Indies when the VOC transferred its possession to the monarch of the Netherlands in 1800.

During the rule of Governor General Daendels in 1808, the city's administration and military were moved south to Weltevreden, with a new planned town centre around Koningsplein and Waterlooplein. Due to financial problems however, much of the old town, its wall, and Kasteel Batavia were torn down for construction materials to build new government and civic buildings, such as the Palace of Daendels (now department of Finance) and the Harmonie Society Building (demolished). The only remnant of the area of Kasteel Batavia is Amsterdam Gate, which was completely demolished in 1950.

The city continued to expand further south as epidemics in 1835 and 1870 forced more and more people to move out of the old city to the newer spacious, green and healthier Weltevreden neighbourhood. The old city became deserted and was a mere empty shell of its former glory by this period. Old Batavia kept its commercial importance as the city's main harbor and warehouses district, but it was largely overshadowed by Surabaya as the colony's prime harbour and commercial hub.

After the opening of the Tanjung Priok harbor and fueled by the increasing rubber output in the late 19th century, Batavia was able to regain its commercial momentum. There had been attempts to restore the city's old downtown prominence by converting the desolated area into the main business district of Batavia. As a result, the former mansions and shops that at the time had been occupied by ethnic Chinese people, were converted and renovated into offices in the period 1900–1942. Many of these offices can still be seen today around Kali Besar. The development of the business district was hampered by the 1930 Great Depression and the Japanese occupation of the Dutch East Indies in 1942.

=== Post Independent Indonesia ===
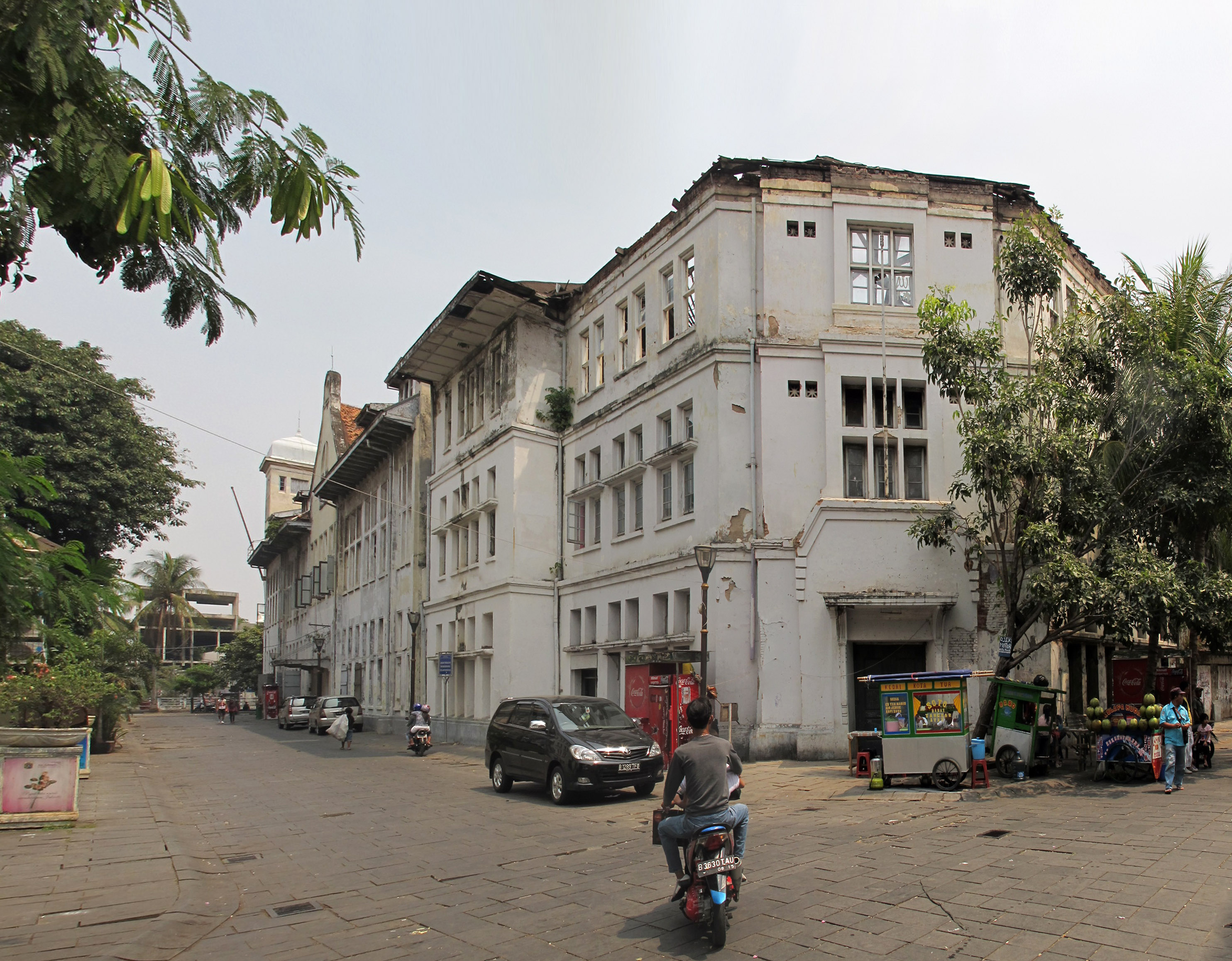
East facade of Cipta Niaga Building, formerly a bank office, has been left roofless and slowly deteriorates; the wooden interior exposed to the element.

After the recognition of Indonesia's independence in December 1949, the business and banking district of Kota was moved to Thamrin and Kebayoran Baru in the south, thus allowing Kota to further deteriorate again after having regained some of its lost glory. The Banking district of Kota area completely disappeared in the 1980s.

In 1972, the Governor of Jakarta, Ali Sadikin, issued a decree that officially designated the Jakarta Kota Tua area as a heritage site. The governor's decision was necessary in order to preserve the city's architectural roots – or at least what was left of it. Despite the Governor's Decree, Kota Tua remained neglected. Even though the population were pleased by the issuing of the decree, not enough was being done to protect and conserve the legacy from the Dutch colonial era. Many buildings in Kota Tua remain abandoned, and increasing pollution hastened up the dilapidation rate of the old buildings. Some old buildings in Kali Besar were destroyed for development despite the heritage status, such as Hotel Omni Batavia, which was built over an old warehouse.

== Restoration and revitalisation ==
The first concrete plan of Kota Tua revitalization was signed in December 2004 by Jakarta Old Town-Kotaku and the government of Jakarta. The commencement of the revitalisation plan was started in 2005. Taman Fatahillah Square was revitalized in 2006.

In 2014 the city's governor at that time Joko Widodo continued the restoration plan of Kota Tua. The project, named Jakarta Old Town Reborn (JOTR), is a cooperation between state-owned enterprises, the municipal government and the private sector. In March 2014, an event Fiesta Fatahillah was held in Taman Fatahillah Square. The government of Netherlands aided the restoration plan in July 2014. By August 2014, 16 buildings in Kota Tua have been restored, such as the Kota Post Office buildings (built in 1929), which has been converted into a contemporary art museum.

The revitalisation of Kota Tua was aimed to turn the area into a tourist friendly and culinary destination. The sidewalks widened and bicycle lane added. Street vendors's scattered in area were relocated in a designated place. The revitalization of the area was completed in October 2022.

== Notable sites ==
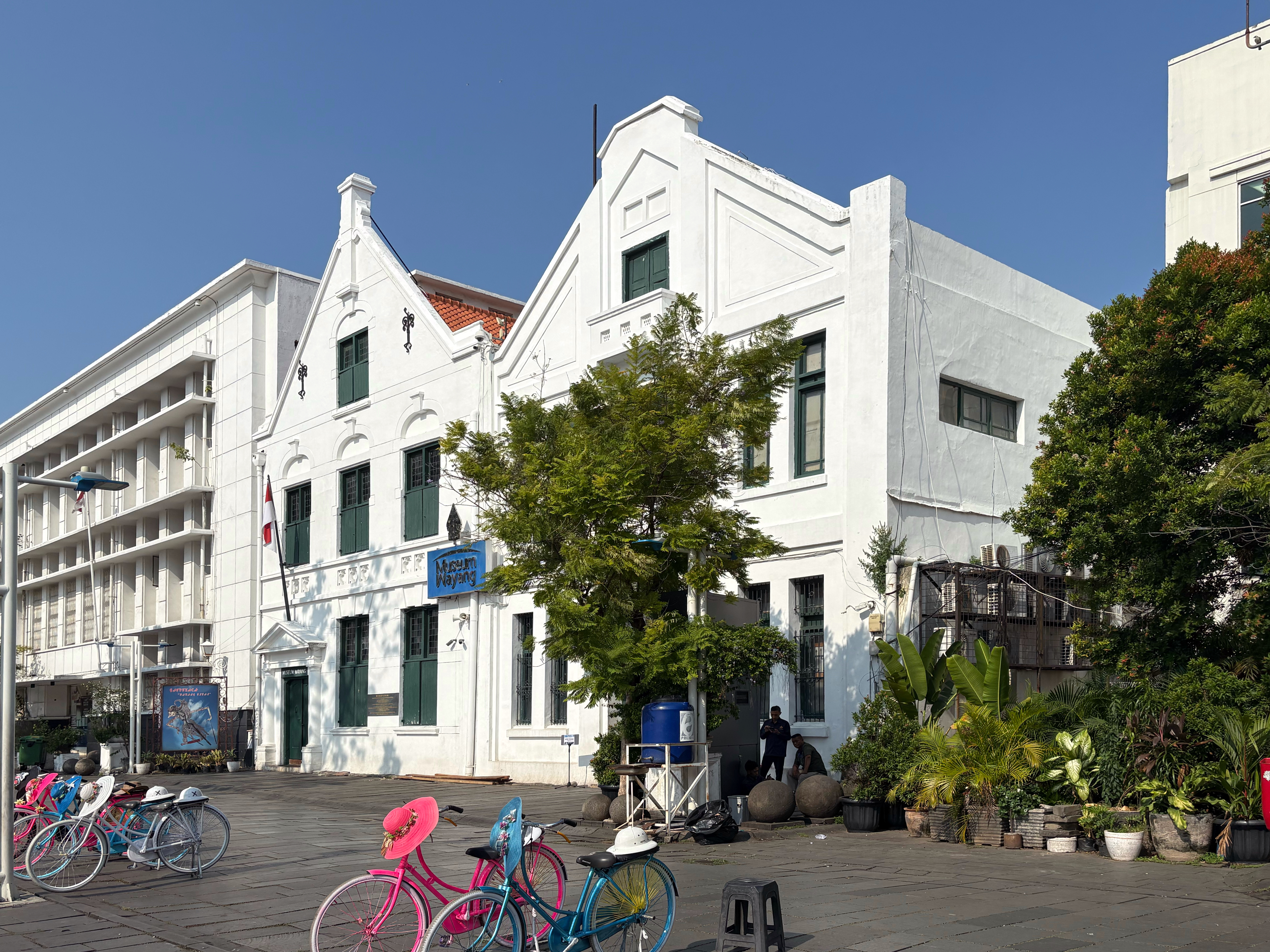
Wayang Museum in Jakarta.

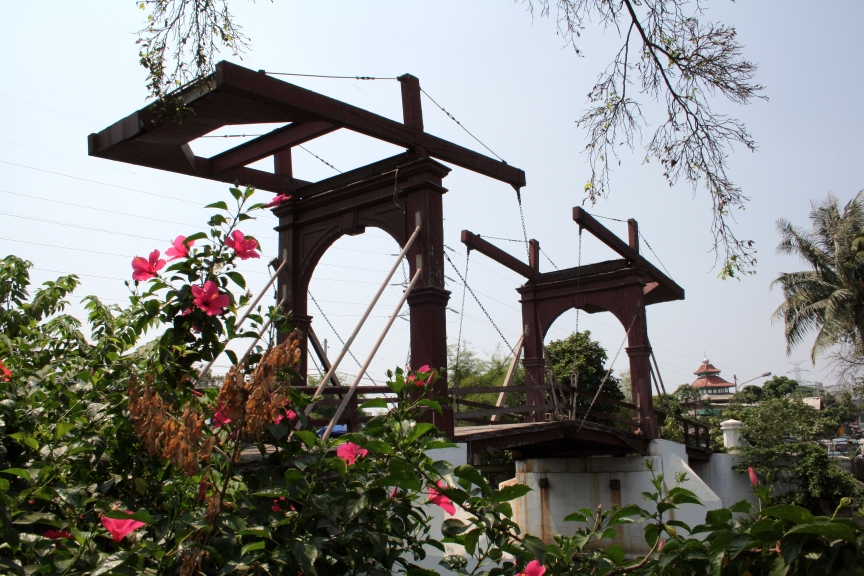
Jembatan Kota Intan drawbridge.

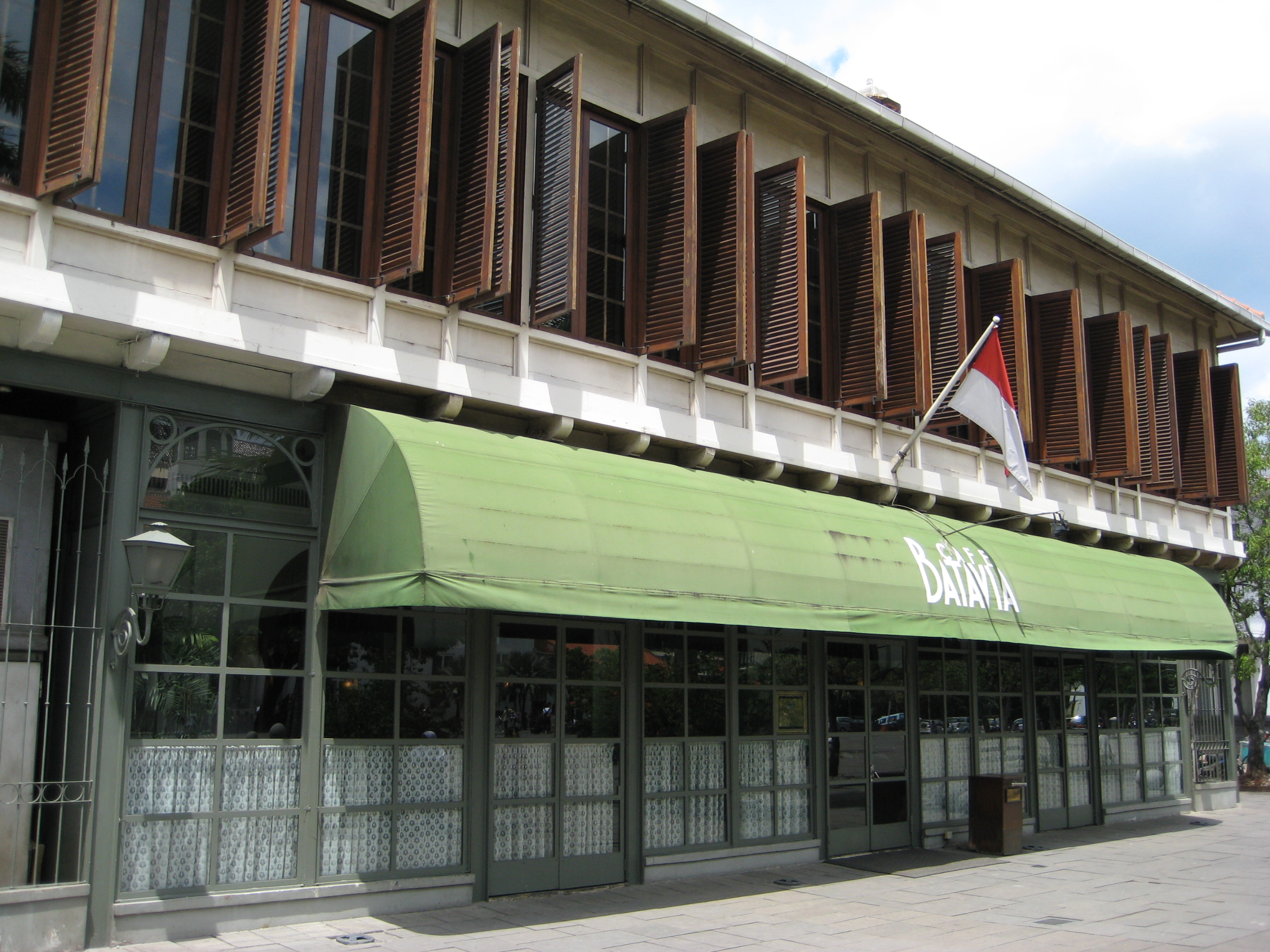
Cafe Batavia.

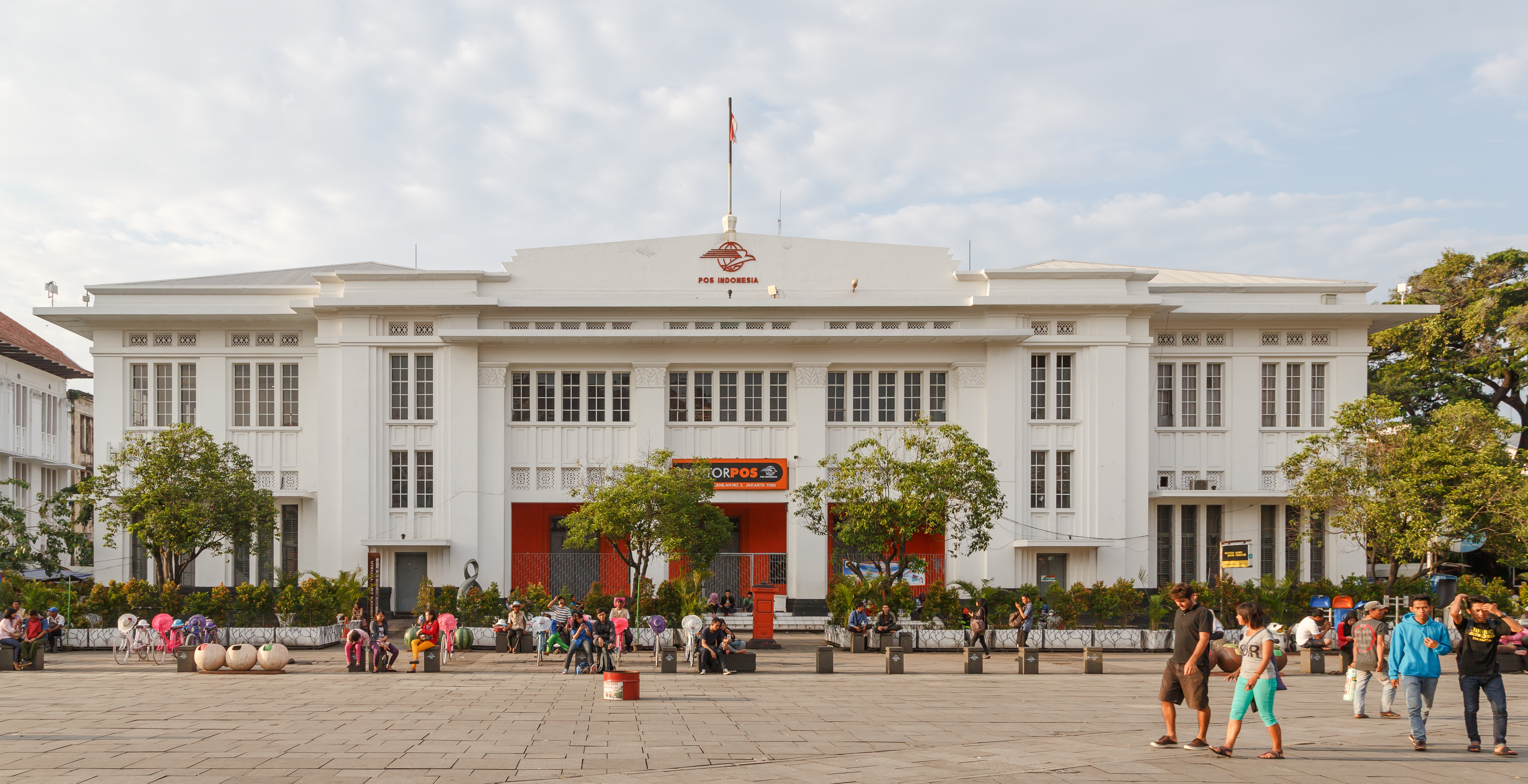
Post Office in Jakarta Old Town.

Nowadays, many remaining historical buildings and architecture are steadily deteriorating, but some of the old buildings have been restored to their former glory. However, there is still much hope in restoring the area, especially with aid from various non-profit organisations, private institutions, and the government all stepping up to the plate to rejuvenate Old Jakarta's legacy. In 2007, several streets surrounding Fatahillah Square such as Pintu Besar street and Pos Kota street, were closed to vehicles as a first step towards the rejuvenation. Since 2014 the old town has a brighter future with the ambitious JOTR project to restore Old Batavia's architecture and putting the site on the UNESCO heritage list.

As an important city and commerce hub in Asia since the 16th century, Oud Batavia is home to several important historical sites and buildings:

- Relic from the Old Batavia
  - Café Batavia
  - Fine Art and Ceramic Museum (Former Court of Justice)
  - Gereja Sion (17th century church, the oldest surviving church in Jakarta, and probably in Indonesia)
  - Jakarta History Museum (18th century City Hall of Oud Batavia)
  - Glodok and Pinangsia Area (Jakarta Chinatown)
  - Kali Besar (original river of Old Batavia)
  - Kota Intan Drawbridge (the only surviving Dutch drawbridge in Indonesia)
  - Luar Batang Mosque
  - Maritime Museum and Harbormaster Tower (former warehouses of Oud Batavia)
  - Pasar Ikan (Fish Market)
  - Port of Sunda Kelapa (the original port of Oud Batavia)
  - Kim Tek Ie (or Vihara Dharma Bhakti, the oldest Buddhist temple in Jakarta)
  - Petak Sembilan Chinese Street Market
  - Toko Merah (18th-century mansion of Governor General Baron Van Imhoff)
  - Wayang Museum (20th-century former Museum of Oud Batavia marking the site of the tombstone of Coen)
  - Hui Tek Bio Temple
- Early 20th-century revitalization
  - Bank Indonesia Museum (former headquarters of De Javasche Bank, the main bank of the Dutch East Indies)
  - Chartered Bank of India, Australia and China building (now owned by Bank Mandiri)
  - Jakarta Kota Post Office (One of a few samples of Nieuwe Zakelijkheid architecture in Indonesia)
  - Jakarta Kota railway station (formerly known as BEOS station or Batavia Zuid Station)
  - Mandiri Museum (former Batavia office of Netherlands Trading Society, one of a few samples of Nieuwe Zakelijkheid architecture in Indonesia)

== List of street names ==
Most street layout of Kota Tua has not changed since the foundation of Batavia in the 17th century. Below is a list of street names in Kota Tua. The list of street is limited to the street that was at one time located within the walled city of Batavia, both before and after the 1628 and 1629 attack of Batavia by Sultan Agung.

To avoid confusion, the official writing of Roman numeral is converted into Arabic numeral.

Some streets bear the name gracht ("canal"), meaning that it was a canal, e.g. Amsterdamschegracht, Chineeschegracht, etc. When the canal was refilled (mostly around the beginning of the 20th century), the word gedempte ("drained") was added so the name of the street becomes the Gedempte Amsterdamschegracht, Gedempte Chineeschegracht, and so on. To simplify the naming, the list will not contain the word gedempte.

Official name	Etymology	Former names	Former etymology & brief history	Latest image	Oldest image
Jalan Bank	Bank Indonesia Museum	Brugstraat (1650); Hospitaalstraat (1667); Java Bankstraat (20th century)	The street had existed since 1632. The name Brugstraat was given c.1650. At the same time the Inner Hospital was built to the south of the street, and in c.1667 the street name became the Hospitaalstraat. When the hospital was converted into the De Javasche Bank in the early 20th century, the street was renamed Java Bankstraat. After nationalization, the street became known as Jalan Bank.		
Jalan Cengkeh	Clove	Prinsestraat or Prinsenstraat (c. 1627);	The street formed the central axis which aligned the Castle with the City Hall. The layout of the street existed before the construction of the City Hall in 1622. In c.1627, the street received the name Prinsestraat, the same time as the completion of the City Hall. During this period, the street passed through three canals, from south to north: Derde dwarsgracht (now Jalan Kunir), Oudekerkgracht (now Jalan Kali Besar Timur 1), and Oudemarkgracht (now Jalan Nelayan Timur); and then continue toward the Kasteelplein. The name Prinsestraat persists for 300+ years until nationalization of the street name into Jalan Cengkeh. The street was equipped with a tram line in the early 20th century.		
Jalan Cengkeh Dalam 1	Clove	Tygersgracht, Tijgersgracht (c.1627);	Jalan Cengkeh Dalam 1 marks the east side of the northern section of the former Tygersgracht. see Jalan Lada		
Jalan Ekor Kuning	The yellow tail fish	Jonkersstraat (south section, c.1635) and Lepelstraat (north section, c.1650);	c. 1619, a street existed in Kraton Jayakarta to the west of Ciliwung. This street connected a cavalier of Jayakarta near the town centre to Syahbandar redoubt at the north, passing an ancient canal which formed part of the northern fortification of Kraton Jayakarta. As the city grew, the street was reorganised into its present layout: The northern Lepelstraat and the restoration of the ancient canal into the Chineezengracht was done c.1635, while the southern Lepelstraat was formed c.1650. The area was surrounded with boathouses and shipyards. In 1740, the massacre of the Chinese people of Batavia occurred on the street. Street layout and name remains until nationalisation of Indonesia.		
Jalan Gang Asem	Tamarind. Gang referring to its nature as a small blind alley.	Gang Asem (before 1931)	The eastern part of Gang Asem (between present Jalan Pinangsia Raya and Jalan Pinangsia Timur) marks the south bank of a waterway established here in c. 1627 for transporting goods. This waterway was cut from the inner city when the outer city wall of Batavia was rebuilt c. 1632 following the attack of Batavia by Sultan Agung. The waterway only remained until c. 1667, when later it was refilled; the street to the south of this waterway becoming a blind alley. The alley probably received the name Gang Asem somewhere before the 20th century. This alley can only be accessed via Buiten Kaaimanstraat (present Jalan Pinangsia Timur). In 1960, Gang Asem has been extended west to reach Jalan Pinangsia Raya. Later, the street was further extended to reach Jalan Pintu Besar Selatan, its name was changed to Jalan Gang Asem.		
Jalan Gedong Panjang	Long building	Gedong Pandjang (before 1931)	The stretch of street known as Gedong Pandjang connected the Groningscheweg (now Jalan Pluit Raya) to the north and the Amanusgracht (now Jalan Bandengan) to the south along the west side of west Stads Buitengracht c. 1931. The name was retained after the independence of Indonesia.		
Jalan Jembatan Batu	Stone bridge	Voorrij Zuid (before 1931)	c. 1632, with the reconstruction of Batavia's city wall, a nameless new street was formed outside the southern city wall and its outer canal, where Gelderland bastion, Oranje bastion, Hollandia bastion and the Nieuwepoort were located. This street connected Gereja Sion with the southern entrance of Batavia (Nieuwepoort). In late 19th-century, with the construction of Batavia Zuid Station over the former city wall, the street marked the southern side of the new station, then known as Voorrij Zuid in c. 1931. The street received its current name after the 1950s nationalization.		
Jalan Kakap	Snapper	Ankerstraat (c. 1918); Werfstraat (c. 1931)	Before the realignment of Batavia's canal and city wall in 1632, the street used to mark the west edge of the mouth of River Ciliwung. In 1632, when the Ciliwung was straightened, a lumber yard was built by the VOC on the new land formed to the west of then Grote Rivier. Around 1918, the street received the name Ankerstraat, and later Werfstraat in c. 1931 to refer to the lumber yard of VOC. After nationalisation, the street name was changed into Jalan Kakap.		
Jalan Kali Besar Barat	West of Great River	Kali Besar-West	Layout of Jalan Kali Besar Barat and Kali Besar Timur appeared around 1632 after the mouth of Ciliwung (Groote Rivier) was normalized subsequent to the period of Sultan Agung's Siege of Batavia. Subsequently, the street was simply named west-of or east-of the Kali Besar.		
Jalan Kali Besar Timur	East of Great River	Kali Besar-Oost	see Jalan Kali Besar Barat		
Jalan Kali Besar Timur 1	East of Great River	Oudekerkgracht (c. 1627); Kerkgracht (c. 1632); Groenemarktsgracht, Groenegracht (c. 1635); Groenestraat (before 1931); Djalan Idjo (c. 1952)	The canal that will become the Groenegracht is among the oldest canal constructed by the Dutch in Batavia. It was constructed c. 1619 together with what will become the Amsterdamschegracht and the Leeuwinnegracht. These canals were constructed by channeling the water of Ciliwung to the east through the early fortified Batavia settlement. Around 1622 the canal was extended to reach Prinsenstraat (present Jalan Cengkeh). In 1627 the canal reached its longest length when it was extended to reach the Tijgersgracht; it received the name Oudekerkgracht ("Old Church Canal"), referring to the Church and City Hall that existed to the south of the canal in 1622 before the current Old City Hall, the exact point of the Church-City Hall building is at 6°07′56″S 106°48′42″E. In 1632, the canal was renamed Kerkgracht ("Church Canal") and around this year the old Church-City Hall was demolished. Around 1635, the canal received the name Groenemarktsgracht or Groenegracht, referring to the old vegetable market. This evening market which sold fruits and vegetables was still remembered today in the name of a neighbourhood Pasar Pisang ("banana market") and was mentioned by Captain Cook. Also to the south of Groenegracht was a large Moorish market (which possibly referring to the Muslim people from Kalinga instead of from Arab) where silverware and other exotic items were sold by Muslim merchants; the influx of these Muslim people occurred at least in the second half of the 18th century, because since the massacre of the Chinese people, influx of Muslim merchants from Arabs had taken place. The pasar ("market") character of this area was also remembered in the name of the draw bridge Hoenderpasarbrug (now Jembatan Kota Intan), a bridge parallel with the canal. The canal was refilled in the early 20th century and received the name Groenestraat until nationalisation when the name was converted into Djalan Idjo. Later c. 1960, the name was changed into Jalan Kali Besar Timur 1, eliminating the "green" historic characteristic of the street.		
Jalan Kali Besar Timur 2	East of Great River	Factorijstraat (before 1931)	The street was a nameless narrow street which connected Kali Besar-Oost (present Kali Besar Timur) with Heerestraat (present Jalan Teh) in c.1650. It received the name Factorijstraat at the end of 19th-century, after the old building Factorij der Handel Maatschappij which was established near this street c.1860.		
Jalan Kali Besar Timur 4	East of Great River	Noorden Kerkstraat (1667); Lloydstraat (before 1931); Djalan Firus (c. 1952)	So called because it is located to the north of the New Church of Batavia (destroyed in an 1808 earthquake).		
Jalan Kali Besar Timur 5	East of Great River	Zuiden Kerkstraat (1667); Kerkstraat (before 1931); Djalan Mutiara (c. 1952)	So called because it is located to the south of the New Church of Batavia (destroyed in an 1808 earthquake).		
Jalan Kembung	Kembung fish	Chineezengracht, Chineeschegracht (c. 1667); Gedempte Chineeschegracht (c.1930s)	The slightly angled Jalan Kembung, not exactly inline with the rest of the street in Kota Tua Jakarta, marks the line of the ancient northern rampart of Kraton Jayakarta. Before a street was established here, an ancient rampart with its outer canal acted as a northern defensive wall for the city Jayakarta. Following the complete destruction of Jayakarta, ship storehouses were established on the northern and southern banks of the canal c. 1622. The area would grow as the Company's ship storehouses until the attack of Sultan Agung, prompting the city to build a stronger grid-like defensive system. In 1635, the ancient canal was straightened, with streets to the northern and southern side of the canal, and by 1667 it received the name the Chineezengracht, after one of the major ethnic group living in Batavia. The lumber yard of the Company's (now Galangan VOC Restaurant) and the Chinese ship (now Raja Kuring Restaurant) were established at the point where Chineezengracht meet the Kali Besar. In the 19th century, Oud Batavia was gradually abandoned, in favor to the healthier Weltevreden to the south. As a result, many of the canals dried out and refilled. The canal-less Chineeschegracht became the Gedempte Chineeschegracht. By the end of the 19th century, a fishing settlement Kampung Penjaringan encroached the western end the Chineeschegracht. At the beginning of the 20th century, the western end of the street has gone, occupied by growing kampung Penjaringan. In late 1910s, a railway viaduct was introduced to the south of Kampung Penjaringan. 1920s saw a renaissance in Oud Batavia, however development to the north of railway viaduct remained limited partly because the area was blocked by the railway viaduct. After independence, the street was nationalized as Jalan Kembung in the 1950s. At present time, the street remained devoid of development.		
Jalan Kemukus	Java pepper	Mallebaarschegracht, Malabaarschegracht (c. 1635); Kaimansgracht, Kaaimansgracht (before 1770); Binnen Kaaimanstraat	The first name for Jalan Kemukus was Malabaarschegracht, after the Dutch Malabar settlement. The street was constructed c. 1632 with no canal. Around 1635, a canal was constructed along the street and during this time the street acquired the name Malabaarschegracht. At this period, the canal on the street stretched north toward Kaaimansgracht or Keyzersgracht (now a nameless private road). To the east of Malabaarschegracht was the trade's quarter of Batavia. In the 18th century, the canal-street became known as Kaaimansgracht. After the malaria outbreak of Batavia, the city was gradually abandoned and so in the middle of the 19th-century Kaaimansgract has gone, the canal dried out and refilled. In late 19th-century, after the construction of the Court of Justice (Raad van Justitie), the northern part of the former Kaaimansgracht - now a canal-less street - was reestablished as Gedempte Kaaimansgracht. It was basically the street on the rear side of the Court of Justice. The southern part of the former Kaaimansgracht was not reinstated because it was traversed by a railway western line which leads to the Batavia Noord Station, at that time located to the south side of the Court of Justice. In the 1930s, this street was named Binnen Kaaimanstraat. Following the nationalisation of street names in the 1950s, the street became known as Jalan Kemukus. The southern part of the former Kaaimansgracht was never reinstated back. Following the demolition of Batavia Noord Station in mid 1930s, a plan was drawn to reinstate the south-extension of Binnen Kaaimanstraat back. However, the plan was never realized and abandoned. With the construction of BNI Building however, a street was reinstated where the south-extension of Kaaimansgracht used to be. This street is named Jalan Lada Dalam, and is used as parking lot for BNI building.		
Jalan Ketumbar	Coriander				
Jalan Kopi	Coffee	Utrechtsestraat (1650)	After the bastion Utrecht to the west end of the street, which in turn after the Dutch city of Utrecht. The planning of the street was laid out in 1632, and it received the name Utrechtsestraat around 1650. Utrechtsestraat was laid across the point where the destroyed mosque of Jayakarta, the alun-alun (Javanese square) and the destroyed kraton (Javanese palace) previously lies. The cemetery of the original Javanese inhabitant of Jayakarta lies at the point where Jalan Kopi meets Jalan Tiang Bendera 3.		
Jalan Kunir	Turmeric	Derde dwarsgracht (c. 1627); Leeuwinnegracht (c. 1632)	The canal that will become the Leeuwinnegracht was the oldest artificial canal established by the Dutch in Batavia, constructed around 1619 together with what will become the Amsterdamschegracht and the Groenegracht; all canals were established when the water of Ciliwung is channeled to the east through the early fortified Batavia settlement. When Batavia expanded around 1627, the canal was known as Derde dwarsgracht. A fish market existed to the south of the canal, at the mouth of the canal and Ciliwung (the exact position is 6°08′02″S 106°48′44″E). After the attack of Sultan Agung between 1628 and 1629, Batavia's city wall was improved and the canal was renamed Leeuwinnegracht; At this time the canal connects Ciliwung (Grote Rivier) and Tijgersgracht. The canal was extended further east in 1635 when it reached the eastern walled-city Canal. The canal was refilled in the beginning of the 20th century, but the name Leeuwinnegracht persisted until Indonesian nationalisation.		
Jalan Lada	After pepper	Tygersgracht, Tijgersgracht (c.1627)	Tygersgracht ("tiger canal", probably referring to the extinct Javanese tiger) reached its longest extent in 1627 when the outer canal of the old fortified settlement (1622) became an inner canal when a new city wall was built to the east and to the south. In that year, the canal connects Oudemarkgracht (present Jalan Nelayan Timur) at its northernmost point, and then it makes a turn to the west in Kalverstraat (present Jalan Pinangsia 3). In 1632, Tygersgracht was divided by the southern city wall, close to the point where Oranje Bastion was, dividing the gracht into the inner city Tygersgracht (inside city wall) and the outer city Tygersgracht (outside city wall). A contemporary observer writes: "Among the Grachts — streets with water channels, the Tygersgracht is the most stately and most pleasant, both for the goodliness of its buildings, and the ornamentation of its streets, which afford a very agreeable shadow to those who pass along the street". Almost all of the sections of Tygersgracht was obliterated in late 19th-century when two railway stations was introduced in Oud Batavia: Batavia Noord Station (located just south of the Stadhuis) and Batavia Zuid Station (later expanded into the present Stasiun Kota).		
Jalan Lada Dalam	The smaller road which leads to Jalan Lada.	Mallebaarschegracht, Malabaarschegracht (c. 1635); Kaimansgracht, Kaaimansgracht (before 1770)	see Jalan Kemukus		
Jalan Malaka	after the Dutch Malacca; probably after Kampung Malaka, the name of kampung that formed in the late 19th century to the west of Kali Besar in the Old Batavia.	Gang Melacca, Gang Melakka (late 19th-century); Malakastraat, Melakastraat (c. 1921)	Jalan Malaka lies on what was then the west-southern city wall of Batavia, constructed c. 1635, where the bastions Nassau and Diest were. This unnamed street was situated between the inner city-canal and the city wall. Several living quarters were established along the inner side of Batavia's city wall, for military purposes. Following the decline of Old Batavia and the dismantling of the city wall, the street remained nameless. With the gradual revival of Old Batavia, the street slowly gained importance. In the late 19th century, it was recorded as Gang Melacca; by 1921 it had required the name Melakastraat. Several modern colonial buildings were constructed on the street, among them the Galeri Melaka. Following the independence of Indonesia, the street name was nationalised to Jalan Malaka.		
Jalan Malaka 2	see Jalan Malaka	Kampung Miskin (before 1897); Gang Orpa (before 1931)			
Jalan Nelayan Timur	East Fisherman	Oudemarkgracht (c. 1627); Steenhouwersgracht (c.1632); Amsterdamschegracht (c. 1632)	The canal that will become the Amsterdamschegracht was the oldest artificial canal established by the Dutch in Batavia, constructed around 1619 together with what will become the Leeuwinnegracht and the Groenegracht; all canals were established when the water of Ciliwung is channeled to the east through the early fortified Batavia settlement. Around 1619, the canal was located to the south of the early settlement of fortified Batavia, at the time when Batavia Castle began to grow southward. In 1622, the canal was extended eastward until it reach the street that will become the Prinsenstraat (Jalan Cengkeh); around this time the early fortified settlement of Batavia had been converted into a public square where a fish market and the large marketplace was established. In 1627, the canal was extended further east and made a turn to the south to merge with Tijgersgracht; at this time the canal separated the Kasteelplein to the north (previously the marketplace) and Batavia settlement to the south and received the name Oudemarkgracht ("Old Market") to refer to the 1622 marketplace building. In 1632 the name of the canal was changed into first Steenhouwersgracht and later Amsterdamschegracht and it was extended further east, the eastern portion was named Olifantsgracht ("Elephant Canal"), referring to the elephant house in the eastern wall of Batavia that was demolished when Batavia city wall expanded and the canal extended. Eventually the name Olifantsgracht was replaced with Amsterdamschegracht in 1635.		
Jalan Pakin					
Jalan Pancoran					
Jalan Pasar Pagi	Morning market				
Jalan Paus Kel.	Whale				
Jalan Petak Asem 1	Tamarind patch	Spinhuis Gracht or Rhinoceros Gracht (1650)	see Jalan Tiang Bendera 1, 2, 3, and 4		
Jalan Pinangsia 1	Local Chinese dialect of Dutch Financienstraat, "Financial Street"	Koestraat (c. 1627); Financiënstraat, Pinangsia (c. 1890)	In c. 1627 Koestraat was created; the Company's hospital lies at the corner of Koestraat and Tygersgracht. In c. 1632, Koestraat is separated with the inner city by a new city wall. The name Koestraat remains until at least late 19th-century when the street is known interchangeably as Financiënstraat or Pinangsia in local Chinese dialect. The name remains until it is nationalized as Jalan Pinangsia in middle 20th-century.		
Jalan Pinangsia 2	Local Chinese dialect of Dutch Financienstraat, "Financial Street", now Jalan Pinangsia 1				
Jalan Pinangsia 3	Local Chinese dialect of Dutch Financienstraat, "Financial Street", now Jalan Pinangsia 1	Kalverstraat (c.1627)	The street that will become Kalverstraat ("calf street") was formed in 1622 when the water of Ciliwung was channeled eastward. Kalverstraat was fully formed c.1627, connecting Tayolmgracht (present Jalan Pinangsia Timur) to the east and the southern section of Heerestraat (Jalan Pintu Besar Selatan) to the west. The street was inside the city wall in 1627, but became outside the city wall when Batavia's city wall was modified c.1632. The name of the street remains Kalverstraat until it was nationalized into Jalan Pinangsia 3.		
Jalan Pinangsia Raya	"Big Pinangsia". Pinansia is the local Chinese dialect of Dutch Financienstraat, "Financial Street", now Jalan Pinangsia 1	Buiten Tijgersgracht (c. 1770); Buiten Tijgerstraat (before 1918)	Pinangsia Raya marks the canal-less southern section of Tijgersgracht, established in 1627. During this period, a VOC's hospital was located to the east of the southern section of this street, close to River Ciliwung. In 1632, with the reconstruction of the new city wall, the street became located outside the city wall, and so the hospital was demolished, replaced with a larger hospital inside the city wall. In 1650 the street has no names in maps. During the period, a cemetery was located to the south-east side of the street, while the Governor's playhouse was located to the south-west side of the street. c. 1770 a canal was dug into the street and the street received a name Buiten Tijgersgracht. The name Tijgerstraat appears in 20th century maps of Batavia when the canal was refilled. After nationalization, the street was renamed Jalan Pinangsia Raya.		
Jalan Pinangsia Timur	"East Pinangsia". Pinansia is the local Chinese dialect of Dutch Financienstraat, "Financial Street", now Jalan Pinangsia 1	Tayolingracht (c.1627); Buiten Kaimanstraat, Buiten Kaaimanstraat (c. 1770)	Pinangsia Timur is the only street in Kota Tua Jakarta which marks the boundary of Batavia's first old c. 1627 city wall. Pinangsia Timur was formed c. 1627 as Tayolingracht, marking the southern end of this eastern city wall. Tayolingracht is slightly angled toward the southeast, following the angle of this eastern city wall. In c. 1632, reconstruction of the new city demolished the northern section of Tayolingracht to follow the new layout of the Inner City, however the southern section of Tayolingracht remains angled toward the southeast. In c. 1770, the canal was refilled and the street was named Buiten Kaaimanstraat. In the late 19th century, Buiten Kaaimanstraat was connected to the south via small street named Gang Commandant (now Jalan Mangga Besar 1 - east). The name remains until the street was nationalized into Jalan Pinangsia Timur.		
Jalan Pintu Besar Utara	"Northern Main Gate", after the Nieuwepoort, main gate of the walled city of Batavia from the south.	Heerenstraat (circa 1627); Binnen Nieuwepoortstraat (before 1931)	One of the oldest street of Batavia, planning of a street that was later known as the Heerenstraat or Heerestraat (Gentleman's Street) had existed since 1619, way before the creation of Batavia's city wall. Around 1622, a small entrance portal lies on the south end of the planned Heerestraat, a point where the planned street meets a canal known as Vierde dwarsgrachts (1619-1632) - the point of the portal lies exactly at the junction of Jalan Pintu Besar Utara and Jalan Bank. The first church and city hall outside the Castle was on this unnamed street. At its most extended plan in 1627, Heerenstraat stretched north-to-south from the point at Jalan Nelayan Timur, stretching to Jalan Teh, Jalan Pintu Besar Utara, and Jalan Pintu Besar Selatan. It was the Broadway of Batavia until the first offensive of Batavia by Sultan Agung, King of the Mataram Sultanate, after which a wall and a new entrance portal (the Nieuwe Poort) was constructed around 1632 (along what is now Jalan Jembatan Batu), dividing Heerenstraat into the Heerenstraat (north of the wall, now Jalan Pintu Besar Utara) and Nieuwpoortstraat (now Jalan Pintu Besar Selatan).		
Jalan Pintu Besar Selatan	"Southern Main Gate", after the Nieuwepoort, main gate of the walled city of Batavia from the south.	Heerenstraat (circa 1627); Nieuwepoortstraat (circa 1632); Buiten Nieuwepoortstraat (before 1931)	see Jalan Pintu Besar Utara		
Jalan Pos Kota	Kota Post Office	Tygersgracht, Tijgersgracht (c.1627)	Jalan Pos Kota was originally the street west of Tijgersgracht. See Jalan Lada		
Jalan Roa Malaka Selatan	South Roa Malaka ("Roa Malaka" comes from Portuguese Rua Malacá)	Roewa Melakka (c. 1897)			
Jalan Roa Malaka Utara	Same as above	Roewa Melakka (c. 1897)			
Jalan Semut Ujung	Ant	Gang Semoet (1931)			
Jalan Teh	Tea	Heerenstraat (circa 1627); Theewaterstraat	See Jalan Pintu Besar Utara		
Jalan Telepon Kota	City telephone				
Jalan Tiang Bendera	Flag pole	Maleische Gracht	The canal Maleische Gracht, established in 1650 to extend the Amsterdamsche Gracht, existed approximately between Jalan Tiang Bendera and the railway track.		
Jalan Tiang Bendera 1, 2, 3 and 4	Flag pole	Spinhuis Gracht or Rhinoceros Gracht (1650)	After the old spinning house which lies facing the canal. The original street contains a canal called Spinhuis or Rhinoceros Gracht. The street layout on the east of the canal stretched south-to-north from Jalan Tiang Bendera 4, Tiang Bendera 1, Petak Asem 1, and a point at Jalan Paus Kel., while the street on the west of the canal stretched from Jalan Tiang Bendera 3, Tiang Bendera 2, Petak Asem 1, and a point at Jalan Paus Kel. The canal was refilled later in the 20th century.		
Jalan Tiang Bendera 5	Flag pole	Pendjaringan (c. 1897)			
Jalan Tol Pelabuhan	Harbor Toll Road				
Jalan Tongkol	Tongkol fish	Kasteelstraat and Kasteelweg; Kanaalweg (1920s)	Following the demolition of the Castle and the abandonment of Kota Tua, a new street was constructed in mid 19th-century as an extension of the Prinsenstraat (now Jalan Cengkeh) toward Sunda Kelapa. Crossing what used to be the Castle and the Castle's plain, the street received the name Kasteelstraat. In the 1920s, the name Kanaalweg or Kasteelweg were used intermittently for the street. The northern and the southern portion of the street were used to be separated by a canal until the 1930s when the southern canal of the Batavia Castle area was refilled. Following the nationalization of street names in the early 1950s, the street received the name Jalan Tongkol.		
Taman Fatahillah	After Fatahillah, the legendary ruler of Sunda Kelapa	Nieuwe Markt (1627); Stadhuisplein (before 1632)	see Taman Fatahillah		

== See also ==
- Colonial architecture in Jakarta
- Batavia
- Dutch colonial architecture

== Works cited ==
- "Beos, Stasiun". Ensiklopedi Jakarta (in Indonesian). Jakarta.go.id. Archived from the original on 5 November 2017.
- de Vletter, M.E.; Voskuil, R.P.G.A.; van Diessen, J.R. (May 1997). Batavia/Djakarta/Jakarta Beeld van een metamorfose. Purmerend: Asia Maior. ISBN 9074861091.
- Kota Djakarta [Jakarta City] (Map) (Jakarta ed.). 1:20000 (in Indonesian). Cartography by Perusahaan Reproduksi dan Pertjetakan Dittop. Djakarta. 1960.
- Kaart van Batavia - een Omstreken met inbegrip van de Reede en omliggende Eiland [Map of Batavia - including the surrounding islands] (Map) ('s Gravenhage ed.). 1:12500 (in Dutch). Cartography by J. Smulders. 1860.
- Kaart van het Kasteel en de Stad Batavia in het Jaar 1667 [Map of the Castle and the City Batavia in year 1667] (Map) (Den Haag ed.). 50 rhijnlandsche roeden (in Dutch). Cartography by J.J. Bollee. G.B. Hooyer and J.W. Yzerman. 1919.
- Kaart van Batavia en Omstreken [Map of Batavia and Surrounding] (Map) (Batavia ed.). 1:20000 (in Dutch). Cartography by Topografische Bureau. 1897. Archived from the original on August 18, 2016.
- Merrillees, Scott (2015). Jakarta: Portraits of a Capital 1950-1980. Jakarta: Equinox Publishing. ISBN 9786028397308.
- Peta Kota Besar Djakarta Raja: Map of Jacarta [Jakarta City] (Map) (Jakarta ed.). 1:20000 (in English and Indonesian). Cartography by Cholid Latif & Co. Cholid Latif & Co. 1952.
- Plan der stad en 't Kasteel Batavia [Plan of the City and Castle Batavia] (Map) (Amsterdam ed.). 160 rhijnlandsche roeden (in Dutch). Cartography by Petrus Conradi. 1770. Archived from the original on August 18, 2016.
- Platte Grond van Batavia [Map of Batavia] (Map) (Amsterdam ed.) (in Dutch). Cartography by Tresling & Co. Visser & Co. 1890. Archived from the original on August 18, 2016.
- Stadskaart van de Gemeente Batavia [City Map of the Municipality of Batavia] (Map) (Den Haag ed.). 1:10000 (in Dutch). 1918. Archived from the original on March 16, 2016.
- Stadskaart van de Gemeente Batavia [City Map of the Municipality of Batavia] (Map). 1:10000 (in Dutch). Topografische Inrichting. 1921. Archived from the original on 2016-03-17.
- Stads-kaart van Batavia [City Map of Batavia] (Map) (Den Haag ed.). 1:15000 (in Dutch). Cartography by A. van Weperen. Reproductiebedrijf Topografische Dienst. 1931. Archived from the original on 2016-03-04.
