= Melaka Gallery (Indonesia) =

Gallery in Tambora, Jakarta, Indonesia

- Galeri Melaka
- Interactive map of the Melaka Gallery area

General information
- Type: gallery
- Location: Jalan Malaka (2013–2018); Kota Post Office (2018–2022); Jakarta History Museum (2022–present)
- Coordinates: 6°08′06″S 106°48′47″E
- Opened: 22 February 2013

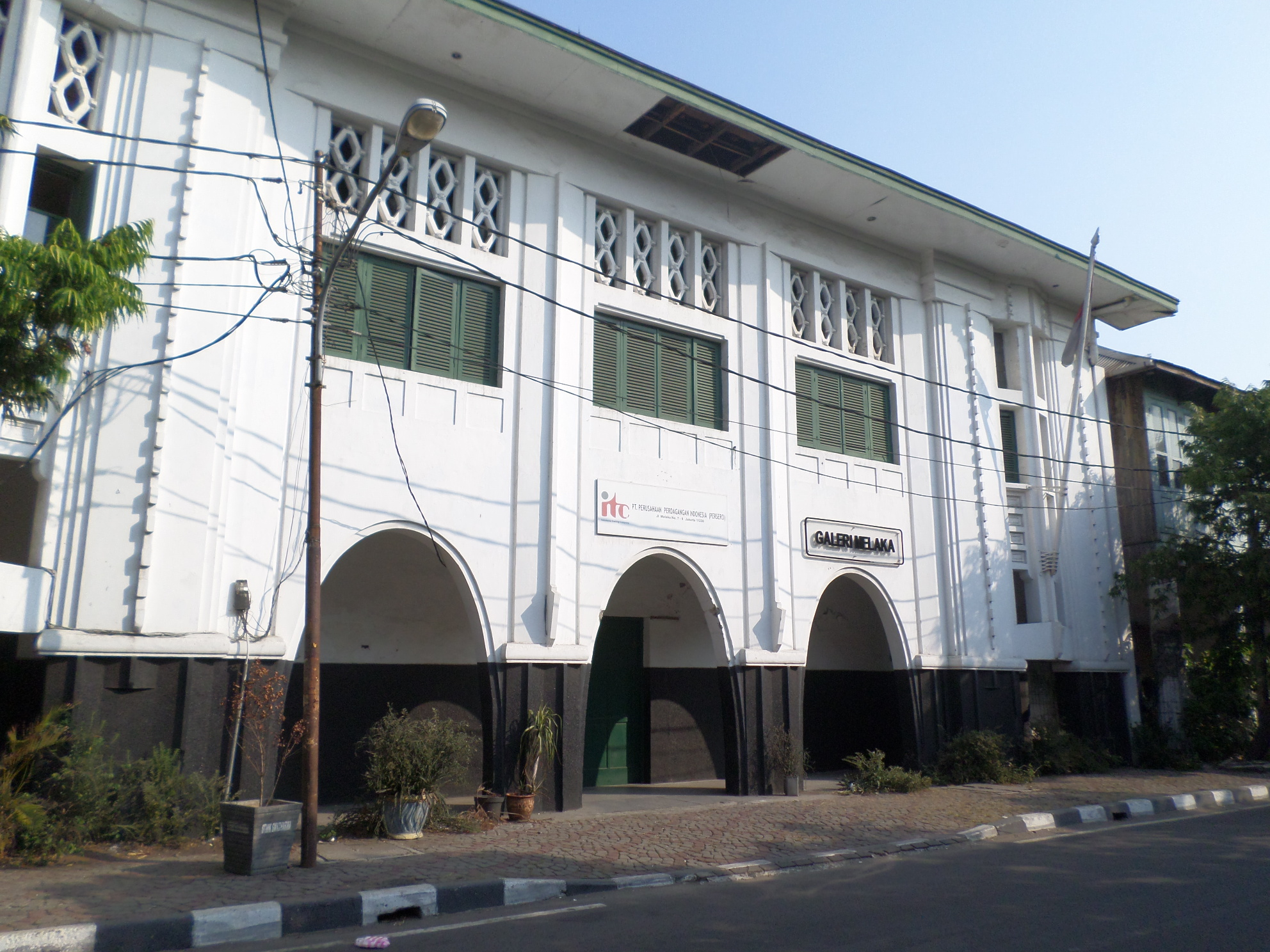
Former building of Melaka Gallery

Melaka Gallery (Note: This gallery uses the Malay language spelling of the state's name, as opposed to the more traditional English language spelling of its name, "Malacca") (Indonesian: Galeri Melaka) is a gallery in Jakarta, Indonesia which displays various pictures and items of the Malaysian state of Malacca. It was established by renovating an old building at Jalan Malaka. The street location was chosen due to its name resemblance. It was constructed with the cooperation with West Jakarta government and officiated by Jakarta Governor Joko Widodo and Malacca Chief Minister Mohd Ali Rustam on 22 February 2013. The gallery moved to the 90 m^{2}-wide Kota Post Office building at Fatahillah Square in November 2018, before moving again to nearby Jakarta History Museum in 2022 and reopened to the public on 12 August 2023, and then officially opened on 16 December 2023 by state secretary Zaidi Johari.

== See also ==
- List of colonial buildings and structures in Jakarta
