= Wayang Museum =

Coordinates: 6.1347°S 106.8124°E

Wayang Museum Museum Wayang
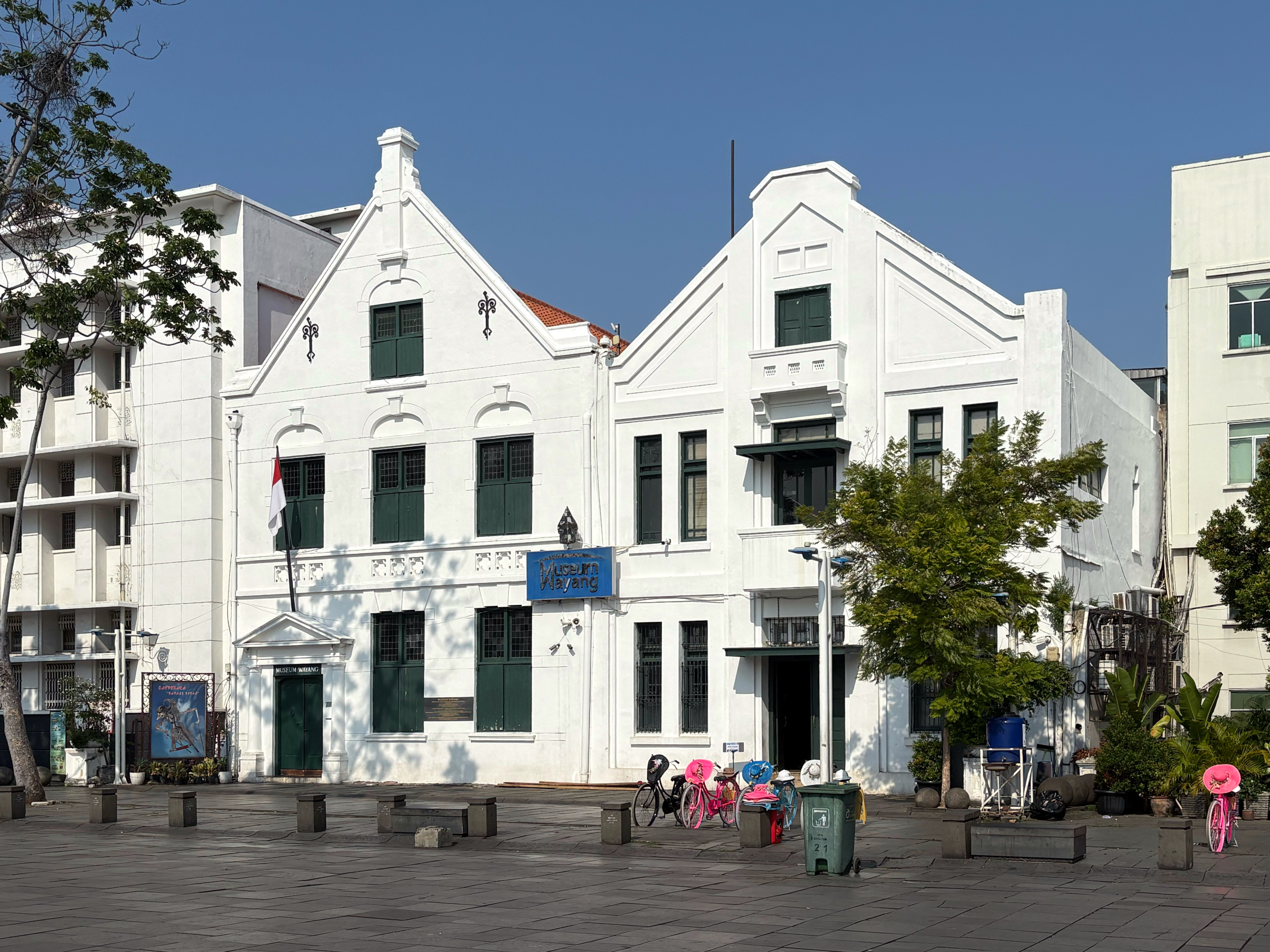
- The front view of the Wayang Museum seen from Fatahillah Square (Indonesian: Taman Fatahillah)
- Established: 1975
- Location: Pintu Besar Utara Street 27, Jakarta Barat, Jakarta, Indonesia
- Type: Puppet museum
- Public transit access: Kota; Jakarta Kota

The Wayang Museum (Indonesian: Museum Wayang) is a museum dedicated to Javan wayang puppetry. The museum is located in Kota Tua, Jakarta, Indonesia. It is one of several museums and galleries facing Fatahillah Square, which include the Jakarta History Museum, Fine Art and Ceramic Museum, and Kota Post Office art gallery.

== History ==
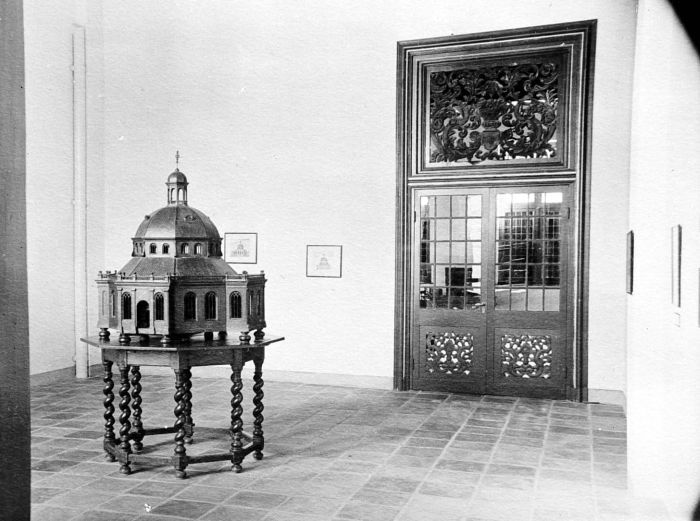
An old photograph showing the model of the 'Nieuwe Hollandse Kerk' in the Old Batavia Museum. the Old Batavia Museum was constructed on the place where the Nieuwe Hollandse Kerk was once built.

The museum building occupies the site of a church which was built in 1640, under the name of the Old Dutch Church (Dutch: De Oude Hollandsche Kerk). In 1732, the church was renovated and the name was changed to the New Dutch Church (Dutch: De Nieuwe Hollandsche Kerk). In 1808, an earthquake destroyed the church. Later in 1912, a building was constructed in the Neo-Renaissance style on the site, which initially functioned as a warehouse belonging to Geo Wehry & Co. In 1938, the building was renovated, following Dutch colonial architecture. The garden of the Wayang Museum, located on the former yard of the Dutch church, was the funeral site of General Governor Jan Pieterszoon Coen.

Later, the building was bought by the Batavia Society of Arts and Sciences (Dutch: Bataviasche Genootschap van Kunsten en Wetenschappen), an institution dealing with Indonesian culture and science. The institution then transferred this building to the Old Batavia Foundation (Dutch: Stichting Oud Batavia) and on December 22, 1939, it was made a museum under the name of Old Batavia Museum (Dutch: Oude Bataviasche Museum). In 1957, after the independence of Indonesia, the building was transferred to the Institute of Indonesian Culture (Indonesian: Lembaga Kebudayaan Indonesia) and on September 17, 1962, to the Ministry of Education and Culture. On June 23, 1968, the DKI Jakarta Administration made the building into the Wayang Museum; the inauguration took place on August 13, 1975.

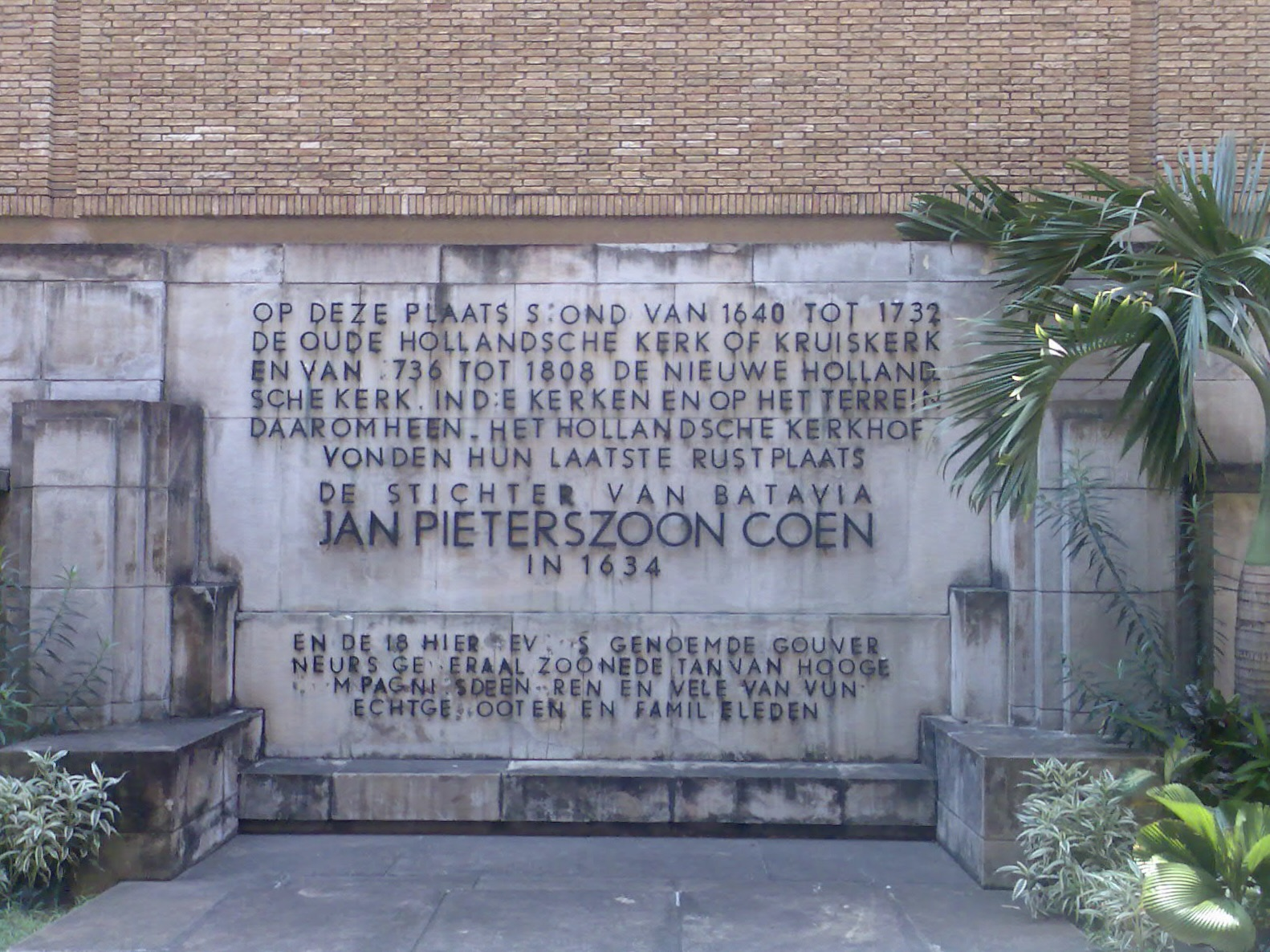
Memorial plaque relating to the church where among others Jan Pieterszoon Coen was buried.

== Collections ==
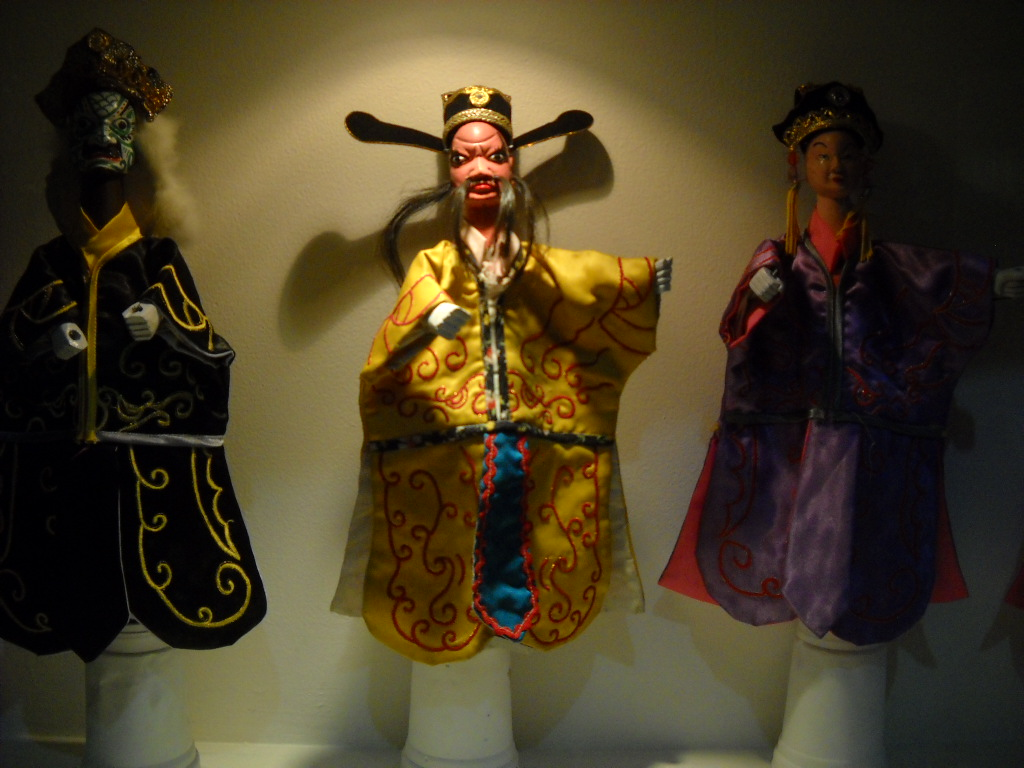
Budaixi puppet in the museum, one of collections originating from China.

The museum has a collection of various kinds of wayang, such as the Javanese wayang kulit and Sundanese wayang golek. Inside the museum is the plate marking the tombstone of Jan Pieterszoon Coen. A wayang theater and a workshop on wayang-making are periodically organised in the museum.
