= Melaka Gallery =

Melaka Gallery may refer to:

- Melaka Gallery (Indonesia) in Jakarta, Indonesia
- Malacca Gallery (Malaysia) in Malacca, Malaysia
