= Museum of Fine Arts and Ceramics =

Coordinates: 6°08′02″S 106°48′51″E

Fine Art and Ceramic Museum Museum Seni Rupa dan Keramik
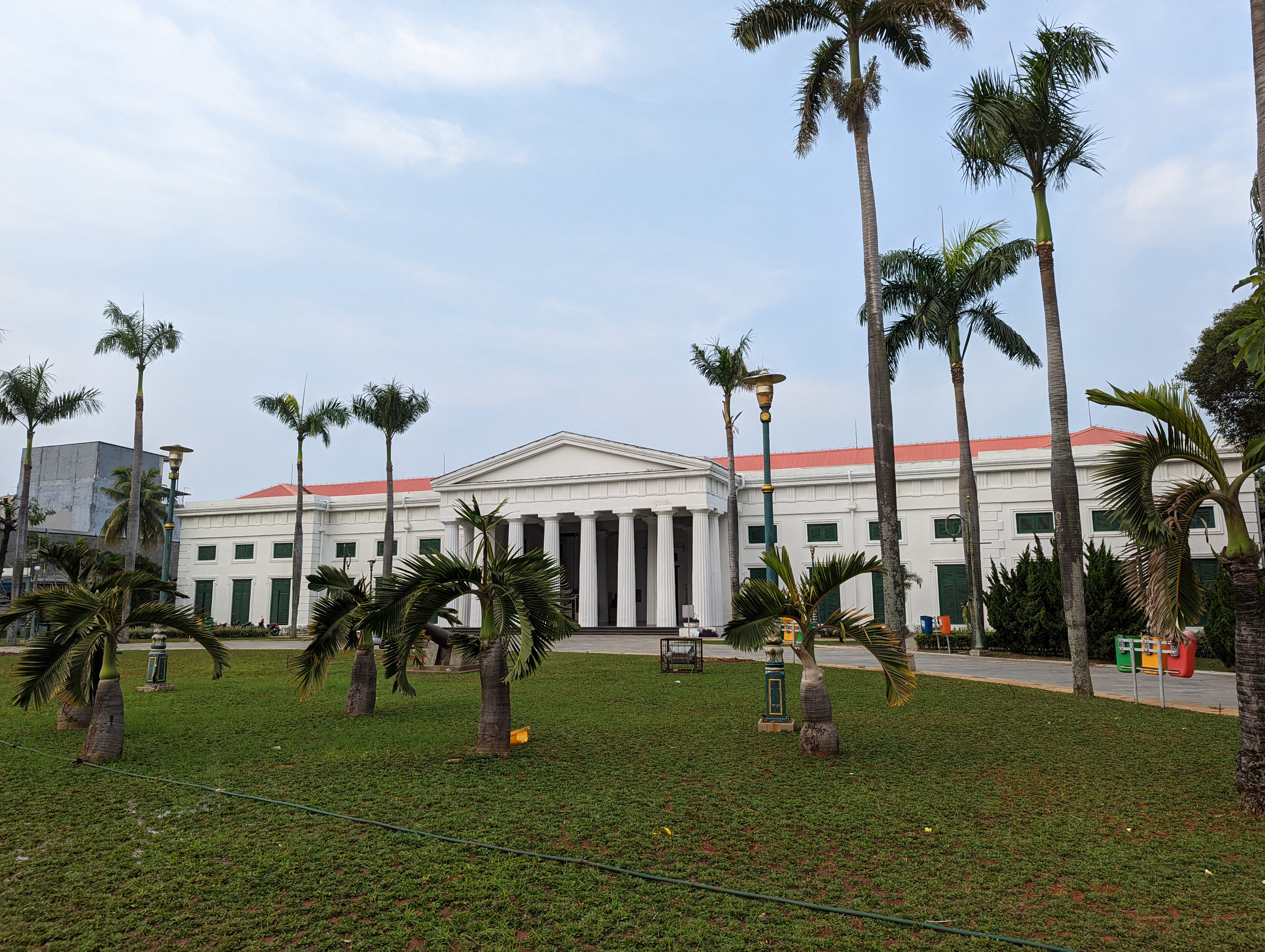
- Front view of the museum
- Established: August 20, 1976
- Location: Jl. Pos Kota No 2, Jakarta Barat, Jakarta, Indonesia
- Type: Art Museum
- Public transit access: Kota; Jakarta Kota

The Museum of Fine Arts and Ceramics (Indonesian: Museum Seni Rupa dan Keramik) is a museum in Jakarta, Indonesia. The museum is dedicated especially to the display of traditional fine art and ceramics of Indonesia. The museum is located in the east side of Fatahillah Square, near Jakarta History Museum and Wayang Museum.

== History ==
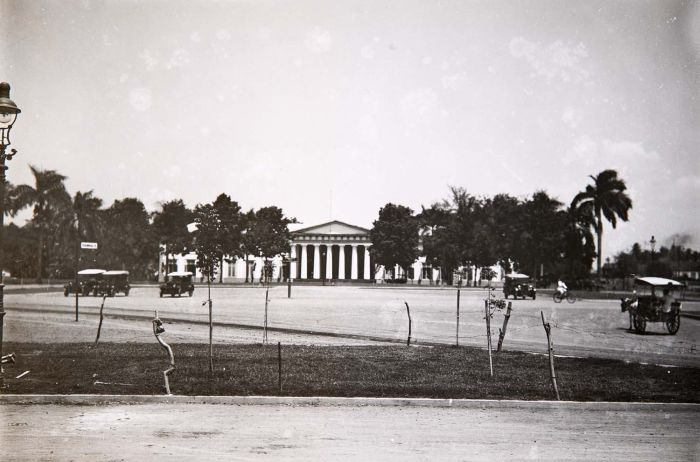
The Court of Justice building on the Stadhuisplein (ca.1930), later to become the Fine Art and Ceramic Museum

The building of the Fine Art and Ceramic Museum was completed on January 12, 1870, and was used as the Court of Justice (Dutch: de Raad van Justitie). The building was known as Paleis van Justitie. During the Japanese occupation, the building was used by KNIL and later after the independence of Indonesia, was used as the Indonesian military dormitory and as the logistic warehouse. In 1967, the building was used as the West Jakarta Mayor Office. In 1974, the building was used as an office for the Jakarta Museum and History Department. The building was officially inaugurated as the Fine Art and Ceramic museum by president Soeharto on August 20, 1976.

== Collection ==
The museum displays the traditional handicraft of Indonesia. The museum also displays paintings by Indonesian painters such as the romanticist painter Raden Saleh and expressionist painter Affandi. The paintings are organized by important period in Indonesian fine arts history: The Raden Saleh Era Room (1880–1890), Hindia Jelita Room (1920s), Persagi Room (1930s), Japanese Occupation Period Room (1942–1945), Pendirian Sanggar ("Founding of Art Studio") Room (1945–1950), Birth of Realism Room (1950s), and the Contemporary Art Room (1960s-now).

The museum also displays traditional ceramics from various areas of Indonesia and contemporary ceramics. There are also ceramic collections from China, Thailand, Vietnam, Japan, and Europe.
