= Fatahillah Square =

Coordinates: 6.1347°S 106.8133°E

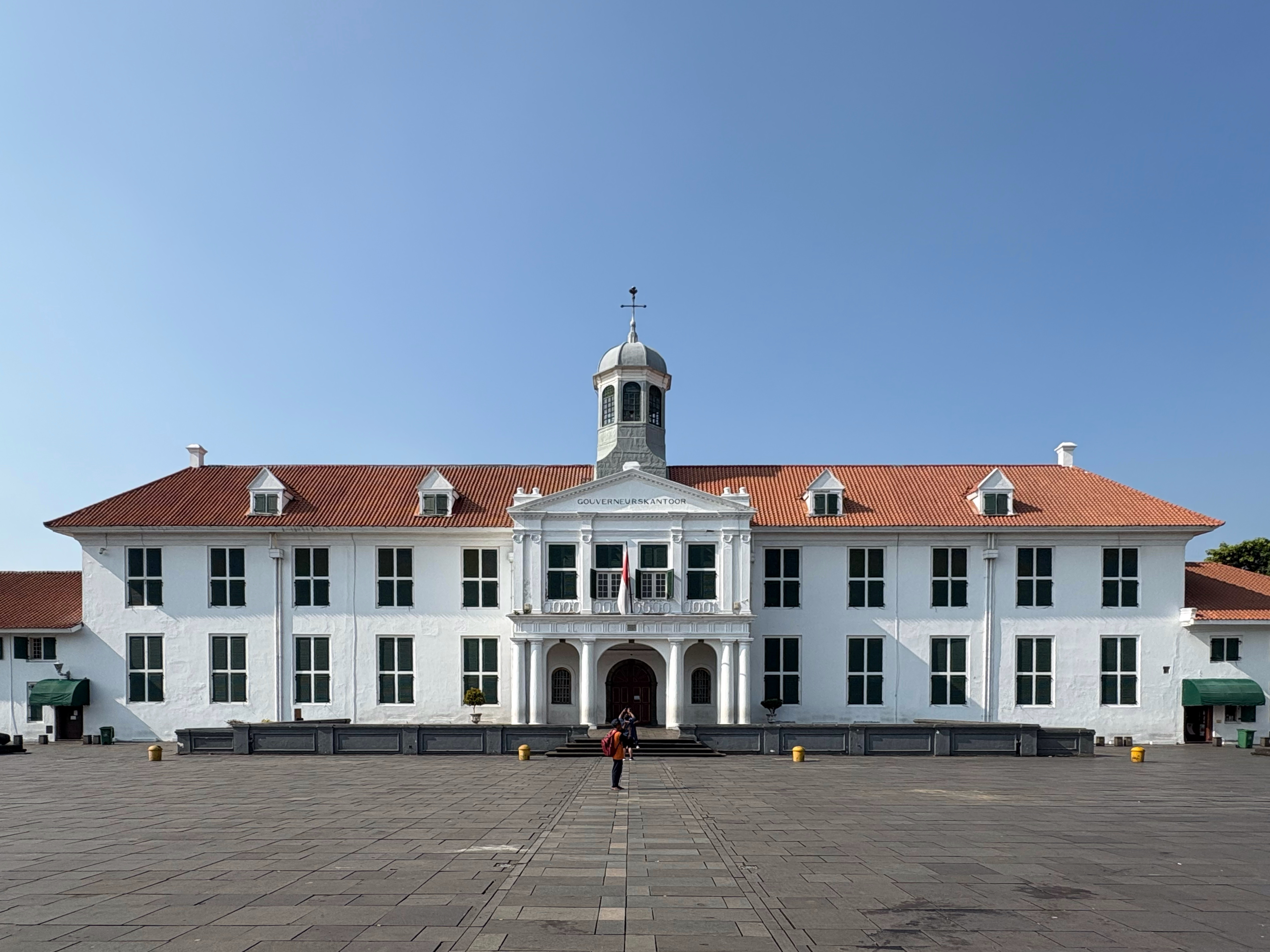
Jakarta History Museum, the major building located on the south of the square

Fatahillah Square (Indonesian: Taman Fatahillah) is the historical center of the old Batavia. The square is located at the center of Jakarta Old Town. Today the square is a tourist area home to the Jakarta History Museum, Wayang Museum and Fine Art and Ceramics Museum in Kota, Jakarta.

== History ==
=== Pre-1632 layout ===
From the beginning of its foundation, Batavia was a well-planned Dutch forted city. The square that would become Fatahillah Square was first recorded in c.1627 as Nieuwe Markt (Dutch "New Marketplace"). At that time the mouth of the river Ciliwung (named then as Groote Rivier, "Big River") meandered toward the west-side of the square, giving the square a riverfront quality. The square was only half the size of the present square, the eastern half of the present square was occupied by shophouses. Shophouses also flanked the square at the north side, while the first City Hall of Batavia was built to the south of the square, center to the north-south axis of the Prinsenstraat (now Jalan Cengkeh), proof of urban planning in the forted city. The name Stadhuisplein was probably given immediately to the square following the completion of the city hall.

=== Post-1632 layout ===
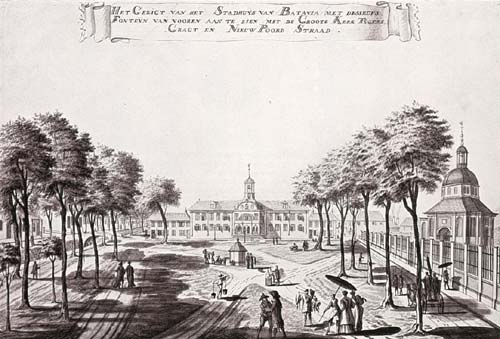
Drawing of the former city hall (Dutch: stadhuis) and New Church of Holland (Nieuwe Hollandse Kerk) in Batavia, Dutch East Indies by Danish painter Johannes Rach, late 18th century

In 1632, Batavia underwent a major restructuration. To strengthen the defense system, governor-general Jacques Specx (1629-1632) redesigned Batavia with an outer city wall, defended by a system of outer and inner moat. The inner city was planned following a grid-like planning and crisscrossed with a network of canals. To accommodate the grid-like layout, the Groote Rivier was normalized into a straight north-to-south waterway. The shop houses at the eastern side of the square were also demolished. With the normalization of the Groote Rivier and the demolition of the east shop houses, the square became completely enclosed with buildings. The Prinsestraat (present Jalan Cengkeh), which in the beginning formed the street that leads to the Castle, were established as an urban center, connecting the Castle south gate with the City Hall, forming an impressive vista on the seat of government. Beginning from the year up until around late 18th-century, the Stadhuisplein was flanked with the City Hall to the south, a church to the west, some shop houses to the north, and the Tijgersgracht to the east.

In 1635, a Chinese clothing bazaar occupied the northwest part of the square. This bazaar was demolished in the early 18th century. The location of the clothing bazaar corresponds more or less with the area in front of present Cafe Batavia.

=== Modern period ===
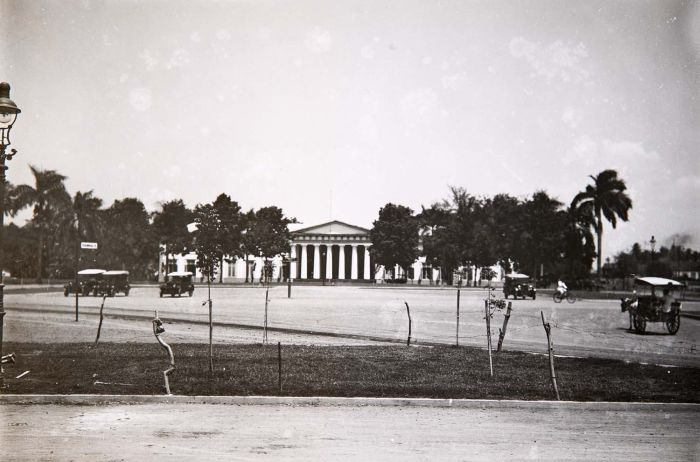
The merging of the Stadhuisplein with the front courtyard of the Palais van Justitie (now the Ceramic Museum in the 19th-century.

In late 19th century, the Stadhuisplein was traversed with a tramline, passing diagonally from Binnen Nieuwpoortstraat at the south (now Jalan Pintu Besar Utara), to Prinsenstraat (now Jalan Cengkeh) at the north. C. 1870, with the elimination of the Tijgersgracht and the completion of the Palais van Justitie (now Fine Arts and Ceramics Museum), the total area of the Stadhuisplein expanded slightly to the east. This layout of the square will be the final layout of the square.

At the beginning of the 20th century, the northeast shop houses were demolished to make way for the Post- en telegraaf kantoor aan het Stadhuisplein (now Kota Post Office). Demolition of these shophouses incited controversy among the architects and academics. Both Berlage and Karsten, noted Dutch architects, cited the addition of the building as destroying the traditional city structure of the Old Town.

=== Post-colonial period ===
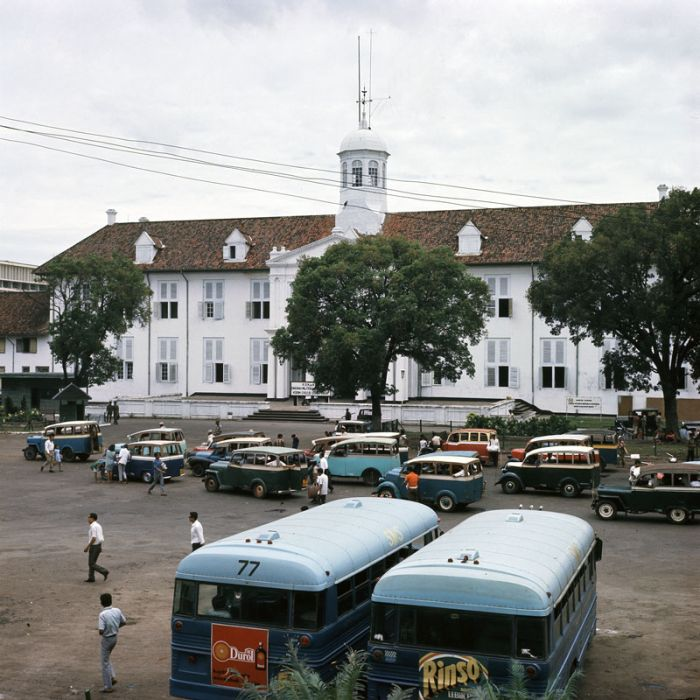
Buses and taxis at Taman Fatahillah.

The name Stadhuisplein lingered until nationalization of street names in Indonesia when the name was changed into Taman Fatahillah ("Fatahillah Square") after Fatahillah, a pre-Dutch 16th-century commander of the Sultanate of Demak who recaptured the port city from the Portuguese.

In the year 1970, restoration of the square and a couple of landmark in the Old Town was done by the governor Ali Sadikin. The former city hall was made a history museum in 1974. Also in that year, the 18th-century artesian water pump was restored in the middle of the square.

== Present ==
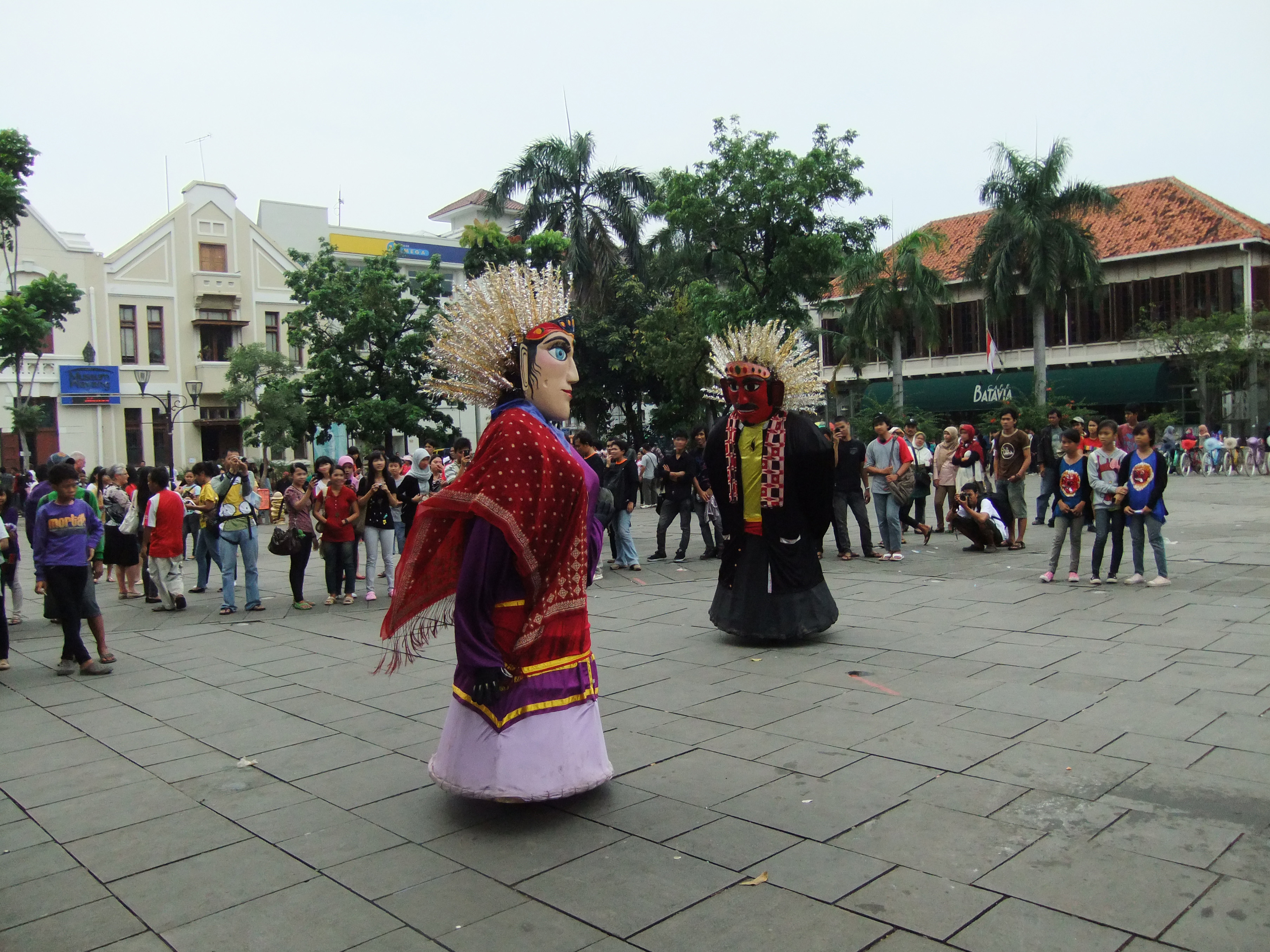
Ondel-ondel performance at Fatahillah Square

Together with the Kota Tua Jakarta, Fatahillah Square is a car-free area.

== Works cited ==
- Cribb, R.B.; Kahin, Audrey (2004). Historical Dictionary of Indonesia. Scarecrow Press, Inc. 2nd edition. ISBN 9780810849358.
- de Haan, F. (1922). Oud Batavia. Vol. 1. Batavia: G. Kolff & Co, Koninklijk Bataviaasch Genootschap van Kunsten en Wetenschappen.
- de Vletter, M.E.; Voskuil, R.P.G.A.; van Diessen, J.R. (May 1997). Batavia/Djakarta/Jakarta Beeld van een metamorfose. Purmerend: Asia Maior. ISBN 9074861091.
- "Indische Literaire Wandelingen - Jakarta, Stadhuisplein, Stationsplein". Indische Literaire Wandelingen. Indische Literaire Wandelingen. Archived from the original on November 27, 2021.
- Kaart van Batavia - een Omstreken met inbegrip van de Reede en omliggende Eiland [Map of Batavia - including the surrounding islands] (Map) ('s Gravenhage ed.). 1:12500 (in Dutch). Cartography by J. Smulders. 1860.
- Kaart van het Kasteel en de Stad Batavia in het Jaar 1667 [Map of the Castle and the City Batavia in year 1667] (Map) (Den Haag ed.). 50 rhijnlandsche roeden (in Dutch). Cartography by J.J. Bollee. G.B. Hooyer and J.W. Yzerman. 1919.
- Kaart van Batavia en Omstreken [Map of Batavia and Surrounding] (Map) (Batavia ed.). 1:20000 (in Dutch). Cartography by Topografische Bureau. 1897. Archived from the original on August 18, 2016.
- Plan der stad en 't Kasteel Batavia [Plan of the City and Castle Batavia] (Map) (Amsterdam ed.). 160 rhijnlandsche roeden (in Dutch). Cartography by Petrus Conradi. 1770. Archived from the original on August 18, 2016.
- Platte Grond van Batavia [Map of Batavia] (Map) (Amsterdam ed.) (in Dutch). Cartography by Tresling & Co. Visser & Co. 1890. Archived from the original on August 18, 2016.
- Stads-kaart van Batavia [City Map of Batavia] (Map) (Den Haag ed.). 1:15000 (in Dutch). Cartography by A. van Weperen. Reproductiebedrijf Topografische Dienst. 1931. Archived from the original on 2016-03-04.
- Stadskaart van de Gemeente Batavia [City Map of the Municipality of Batavia] (Map) (Den Haag ed.). 1:10000 (in Dutch). 1918. Archived from the original on March 16, 2016.
