= Kota Post Office =

Building in Jakarta, Indonesia

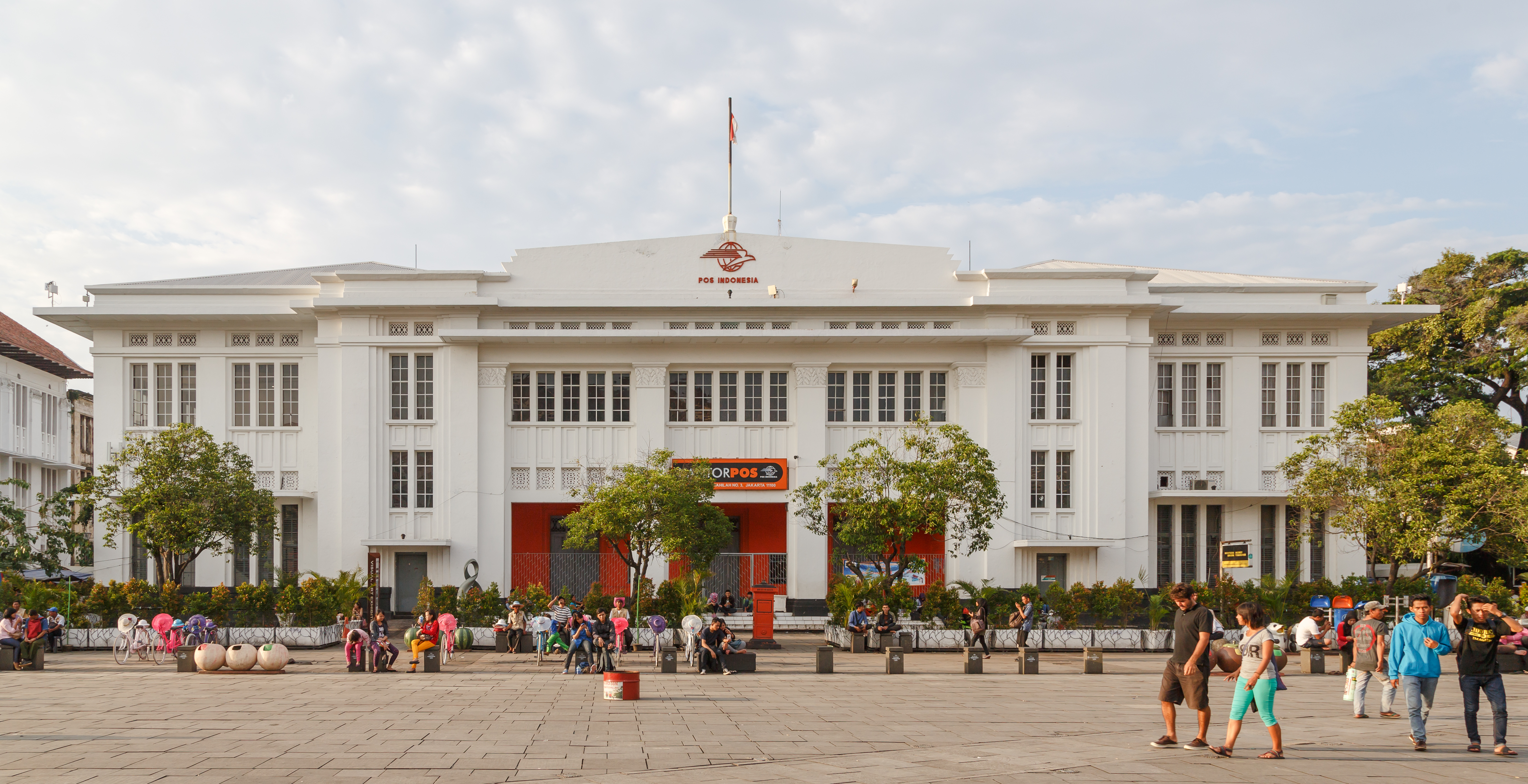
Kota Post Office at Fatahillah Square in 2015

The Kota Post Office (Indonesian: Kantor Pos Kota) is a historic building in Kota, Jakarta, Indonesia; operated by Pos Indonesia. It was designed by Ir. R. Baumgartner in 1929 as the Post- en telegraaf kantoor. The building is one of the buildings in Fatahillah Square.

The building was designed in an early modern style known as Nieuwe Zakelijkheid which was popular in the Netherlands and became popular in the Dutch East Indies by the end of 1920s. The style was slightly conformed to the tropical climate of Indonesia with the addition of 'double facade' concept, a typical element of tropical Indische architecture. Buildings within the vicinity of Kota Post Office designed in a similar style include Bank Mandiri Museum (1929).

The building currently houses a contemporary art gallery.

== See also ==
Media related to Kota Post Office at Wikimedia Commons

- List of colonial buildings and structures in Jakarta
- New Indies Style
