= Jakarta History Museum =

Coordinates: 6°08′06″S 106°48′47″E

Jakarta History Museum / Fatahillah Museum / Batavia Museum Museum Sejarah Jakarta
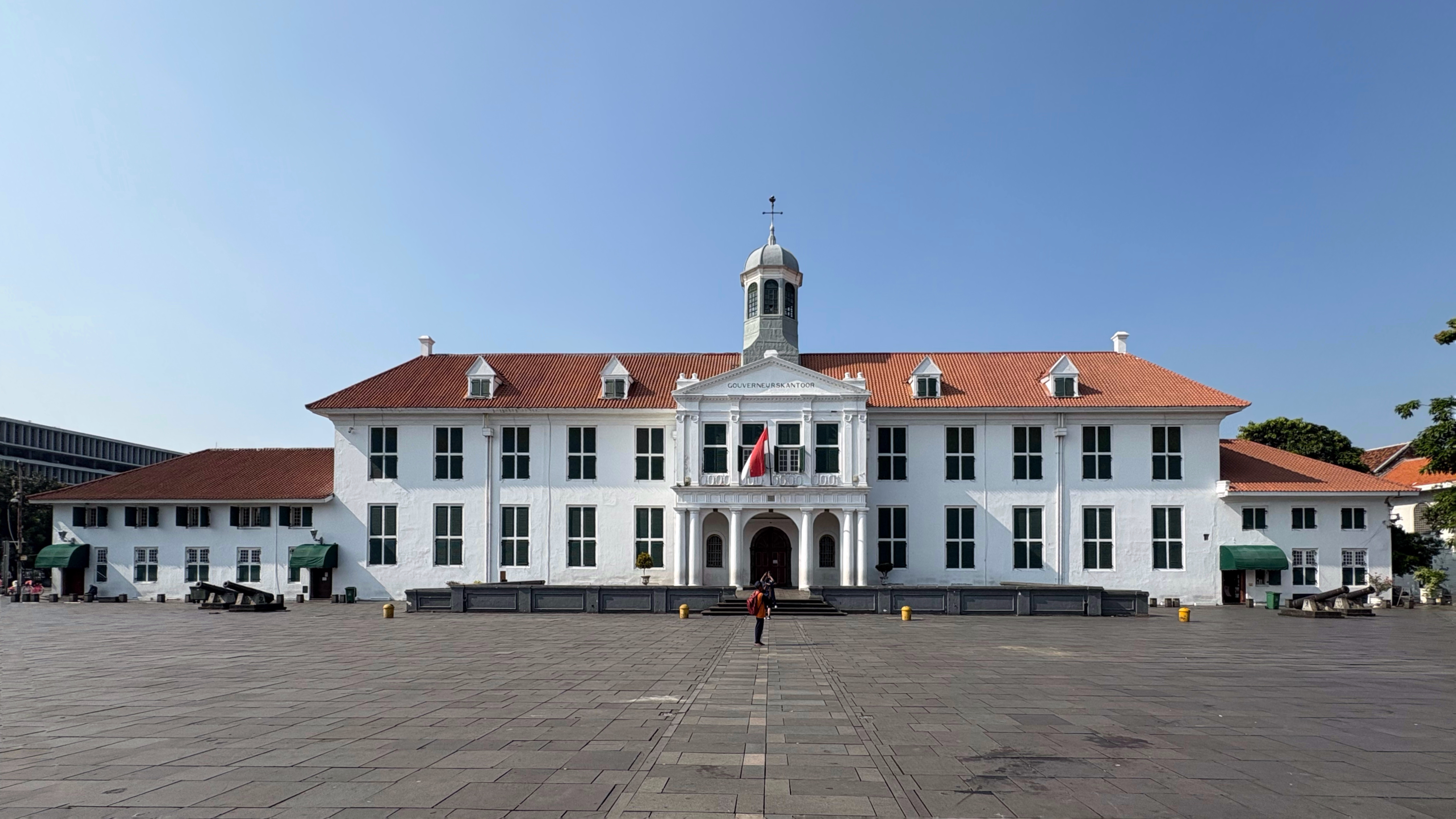
- The front view of the museum seen from the Fatahillah Square (Indonesian: Taman Fatahillah)
- Established: 1707
- Location: Jl Taman Fatahillah 1, Jakarta Barat, Jakarta, Indonesia
- Type: History museum
- Visitors: 69,708 (2006); 75,067 (2007)
- Public transit access: Museum Sejarah Jakarta or Kota; Jakarta Kota
- Website: Jakarta History Museum

The Jakarta History Museum (Indonesian: Museum Sejarah Jakarta), also known as Fatahillah Museum or Batavia Museum, is located in the Old Town (known as Kota Tua) of Jakarta, Indonesia. The building was built in 1710 as the Stadhuis (city hall) of Batavia. Jakarta History Museum opened in 1974 and displays objects from the prehistory period of the city region, the founding of Jayakarta in 1527, and the Dutch colonization period from the 16th century until Indonesia's Independence in 1945.

The museum is located in south side of Fatahillah Square (former Batavia city square) near Wayang Museum and Fine Art and Ceramic Museum. The building is believed to be modeled after Dam Palace.

== History ==
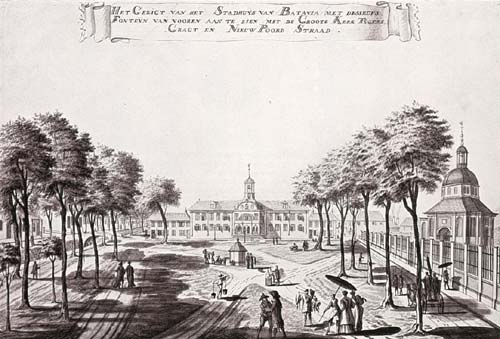
Drawing of the city hall (Dutch: stadhuis) in Batavia (by Danish painter Johannes Rach, late 18th century)

=== The VOC ===
The building where the museum is established was formerly the city hall of Batavia, the Stadhuis. The first Stadhuis was finalized in 1627 in the location of the present building. The construction of this building was continued in 1649. In 1707, the building was renovated as a whole, which resulted in the present building. Several features of the present building came from this year, including the portico. The renovation was completed in 1710 and the building was inaugurated by Governor General Abraham van Riebeeck as the administrative headquarter of the Dutch East India Company.

=== Dutch colonial government ===
Following the bankruptcy of the Dutch East India Company, the building was taken over by the Dutch colonial government and used as the city hall of the colonial government.

As the city continued to expand southward, the building's function as city hall (Dutch gemeentehuis) ended in 1913.

=== Post-independence ===
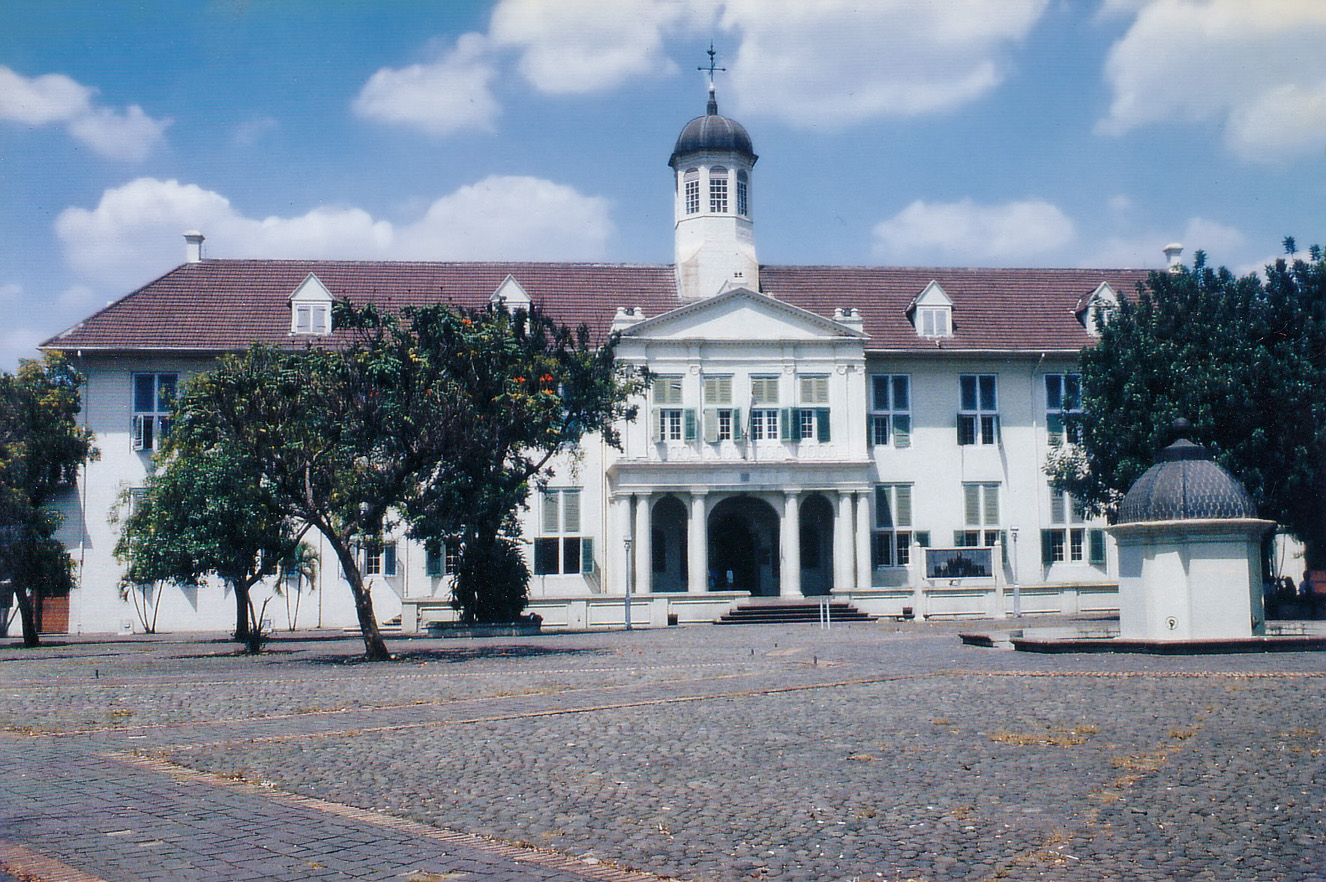
The museum in 1987

After the declaration of Indonesia in 1945, the building was used as West Java governor office until 1961, when Jakarta was declared an independent autonomy. Afterwards, the building was used as the headquarter for KODIM 0503 Jakarta Barat.

In 1970, the Fatahillah Square was declared a Cultural Heritage. This effort was the beginning of the development of the historical area of the City of Jakarta, carried out by the Government of DKI Jakarta. The Jakarta History Museum was declared as a museum on 30 March 1974 as the center for collection, conservation and research for all kinds of objects of cultural heritage related to the history of the City of Jakarta.

== Architecture ==
This building is located in front of a public square, which in the past was known as Stadhuisplein, the City Hall Square. The square is now known as Fatahillah Square (Indonesian: Taman Fatahillah). In the center of the square is a fountain which was used as a water supply during the colonial era. Also located in the square is a Portuguese cannon (known as Si Jagur Cannon) with a hand ornament showing a fico gesture, which is believed by local people to be able to induce fertility on women.

The building's generous scale with massive timber beams and floorbands. The building contains 37 ornate rooms. There are also some cells located beneath the front portico which were used as dungeons, which functioned until 1846. A Javanese freedom fighter Prince Diponegoro, who was treacherously arrested, was imprisoned here in 1830 before being banished to Manado, North Sulawesi.

The building was modeled after the Paleis op de Dam in Amsterdam. Similarities including the domed cupola crowning the structure and a proportion typical of 17th-century Dutch city hall.

== Collections ==
Jakarta History Museum has a collection of around 23,500 objects, some of them inherited from de Oude Bataviasche Museum (now the Wayang Museum). The collection includes objects from the Dutch East Indies Company, historic maps, paintings, ceramics, furnitures, and archeological objects from the prehistoric era such as ancient inscriptions and sword. The Jakarta History Museum also contains the richest collection of Betawi-style furniture from the 17th to the 19th century. The collections are divided into several rooms such as Prehistoric Jakarta Room, Tarumanegara Room, Jayakarta Room, Fatahillah Room, Sultan Agung Room, and M.H. Thamrin Room.

The museum also contains a replica of the Tugu Inscription (the original being in the National Museum) from the age of Great King Purnawarman, which is the evidence that the center of the Kingdom of Tarumanegara was located around the seaport of Tanjung Priok on the coast of Jakarta. There is also a replica of the 16th-century map of the Portuguese Padrao Monument, a historical evidence of the ancient Sunda Kelapa Harbor.

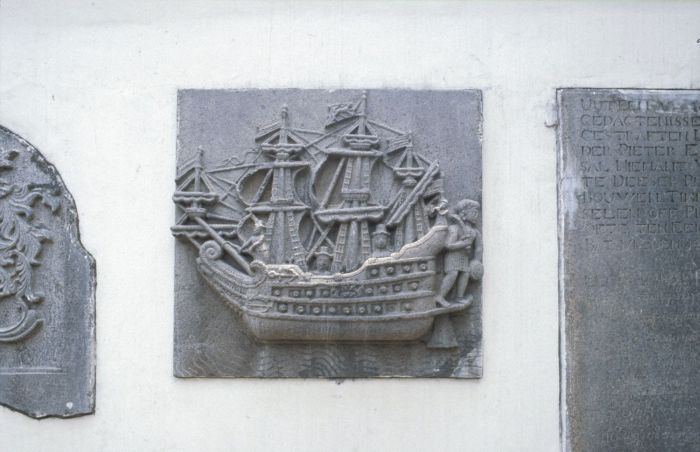
A stone tablet showing a VOC vessel in a wall of the Jakarta History Museum

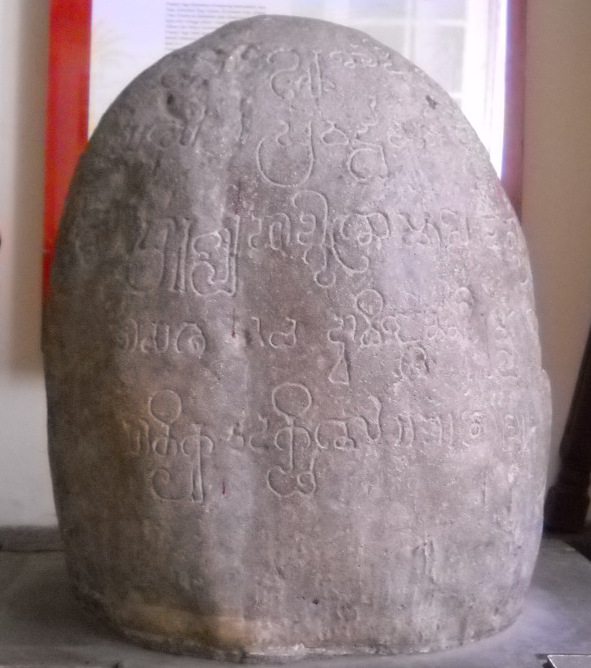
Replica of Tugu inscription.

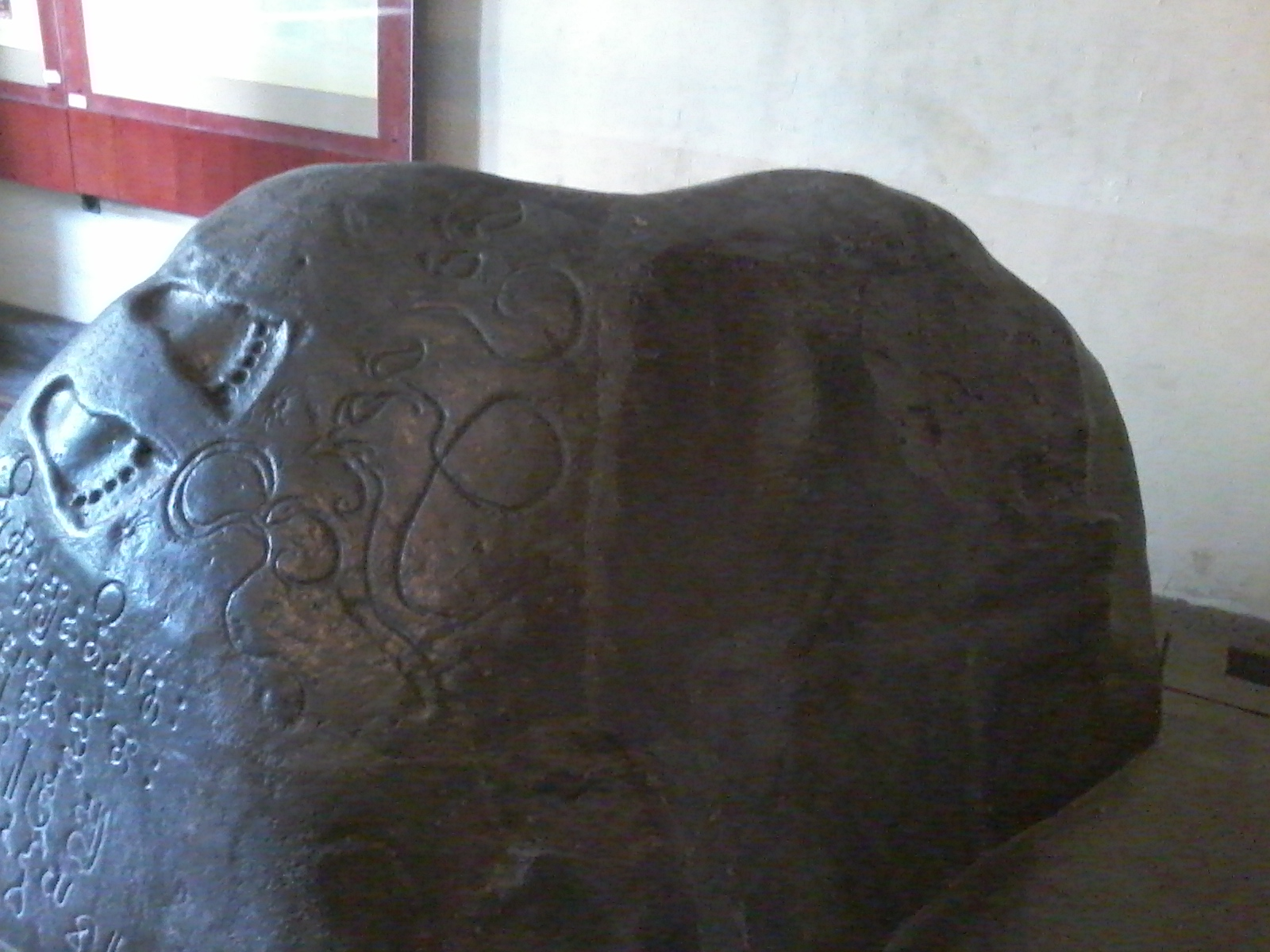
Replica of Ciaruteun inscription.

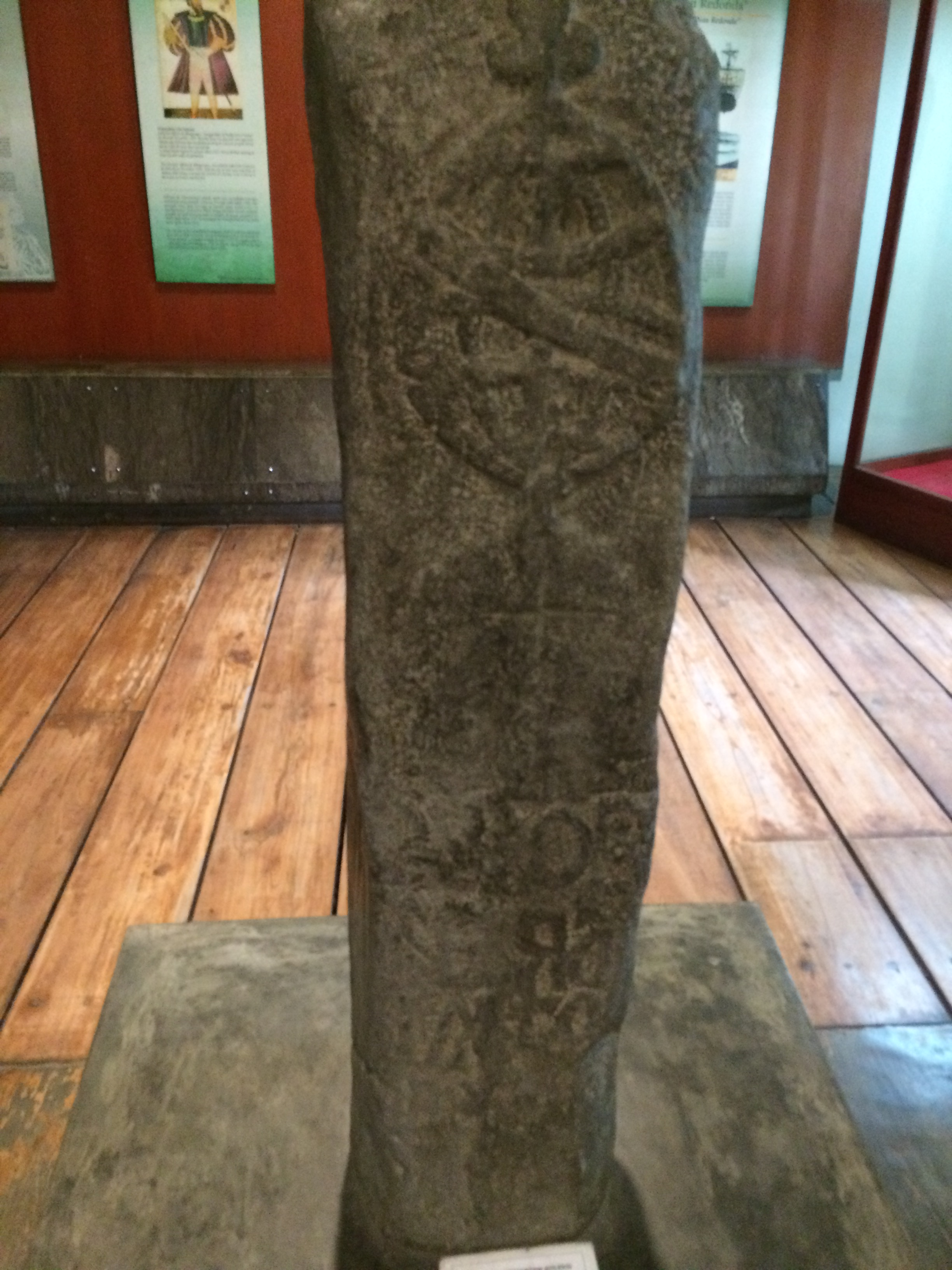
Replica of Padrão of Sunda Kalapa.

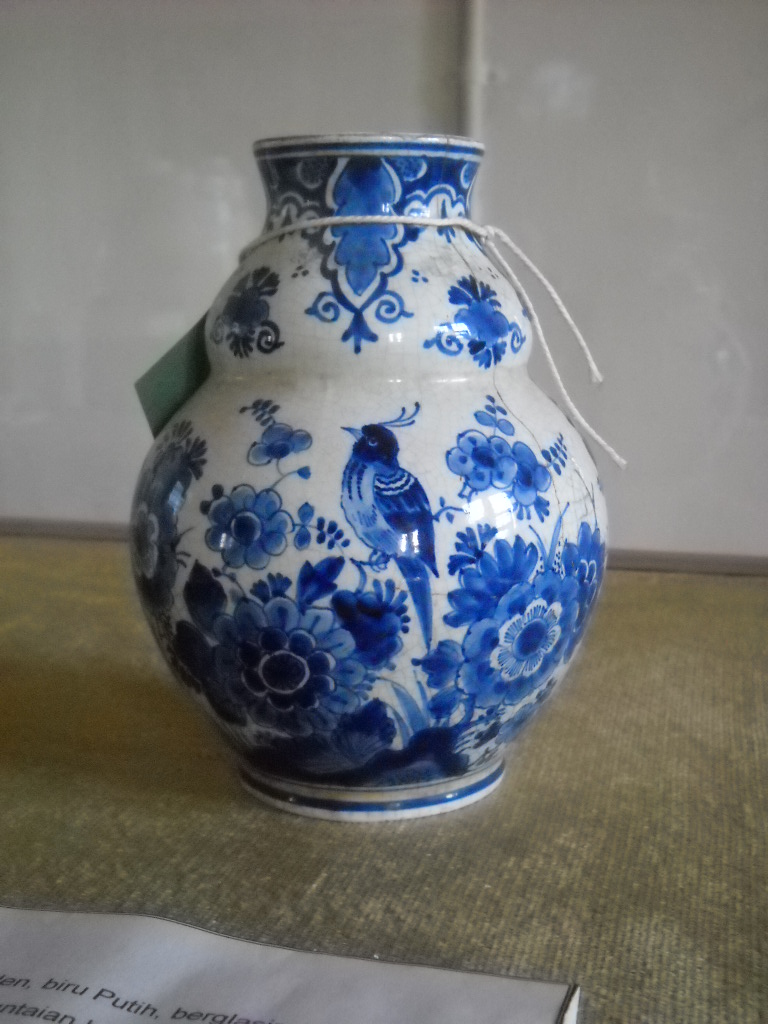
Japanese Ceramic pot from 17th century.

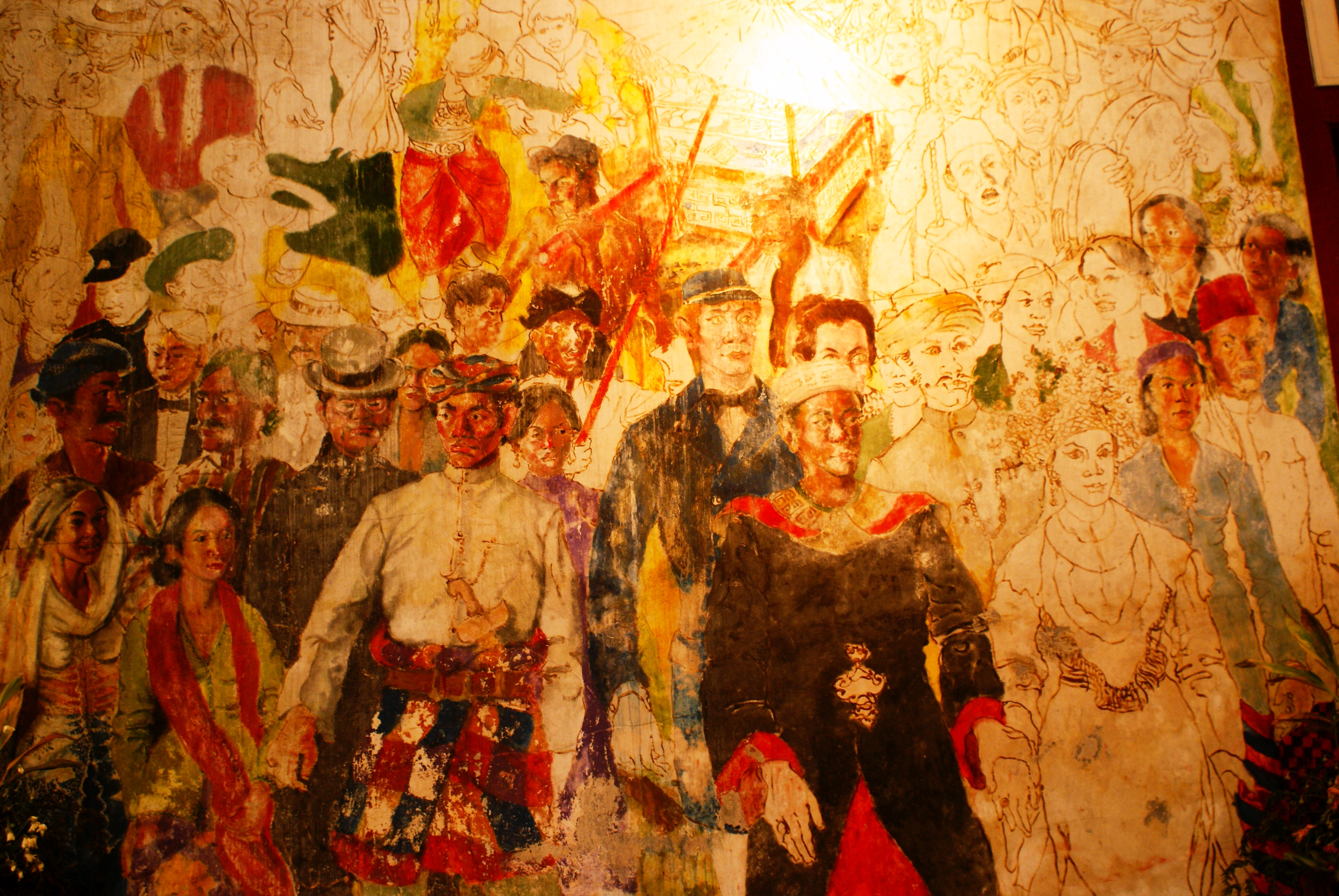
Unfinished Mural by Harijadi Sumodidjojo.

== Conservation ==
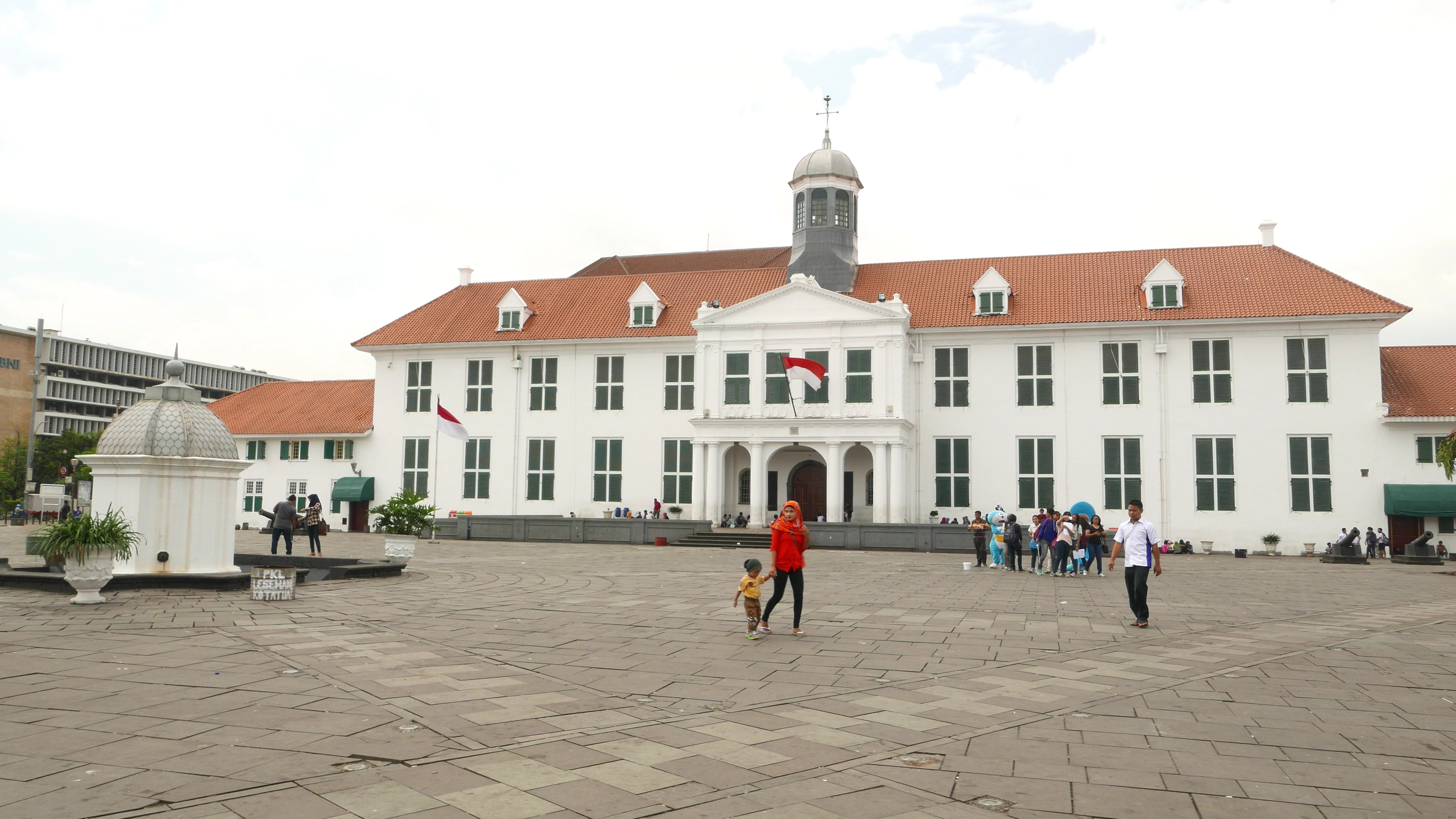
As seen in March 2015

The museum was temporarily closed in July 2011 for conservation. Conservation activities conducted with aid from the Dutch government were carried out starting in 2012 and the renovation was completed in February 2015. A new "Conservation room" was added during the renovation, displaying the vision and mission of JOTR (Jakarta Old Town Reborn) for the future of Old Batavia.

== See also ==
- List of colonial buildings and structures in Jakarta
- List of museums and cultural institutions in Indonesia
