= List of museums and cultural institutions in Indonesia =

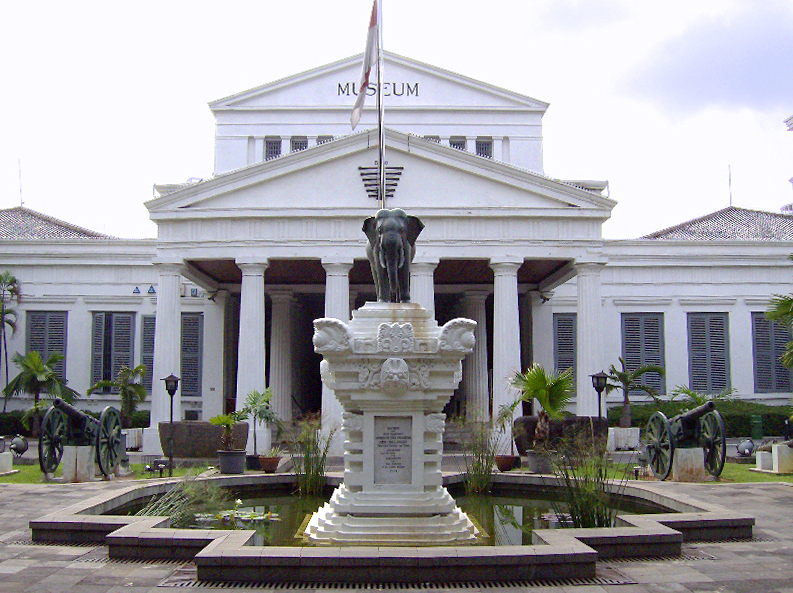
The National Museum of Indonesia in Jakarta, the oldest cultural society in Indonesia, was established in 1778. The building in the photograph, the second building of the museum's society, was also the oldest museum building in Indonesia, dating from the 19th century.

This list includes many museums and cultural institutions in Indonesia (including aquariums, zoos, and botanical gardens, following the definition of the International Council of Museums).

Heritage buildings such as candi, mosques, colonial churches and buildings with no site museum should not be placed in the list.

== History ==
=== Colonial period ===
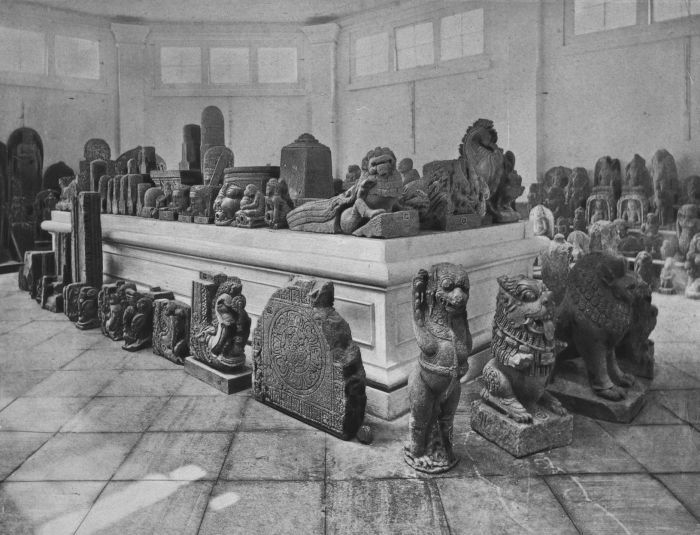
Collection of artifacts by the Batavia Society of Art and Science

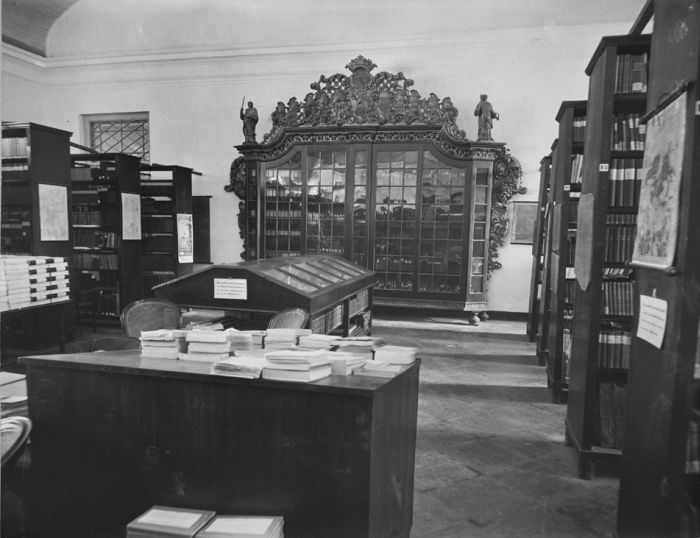
The library of the Batavia Society of Art and Science. The baroque bookcase in the picture is still kept in the Jakarta History Museum as of 2012, although under lack of standardized museum maintenance.

Before the 20th-century, there was little interest in the study of the native culture of Indonesia by the colonial government. Most anthropologic studies were done by a few non-governmental institutions and individuals. Among the non-governmental institution was the Batavian Society of Arts and Science, which established a museum for Indonesian culture and history. Individuals e.g. Sir Stamford Raffles and Dr. Snoeck Hourgrogne wrote valuable studies on native culture and history before the 20th century.

The first museum in Indonesia seems to have been that built by Rumphius in Ambon, built in 1662. Nothing remains of it except books written by himself, which are now in the library of the National Museum. Its successor was the Batavia Society of Art and Science, established on 24 April 1778. It built a museum and a library, played an important role in research, and collected much material on the natural history and culture of Indonesia. It later came under the direct control of the British Lieutenant-Governor Raffles who, among other things, provided it with a new office building for the museum and library administration. The museum collection and library continued to grow, and in 1862 the government built, in the center of New Batavia, what is now the National Museum, the previous building is now Wayang Museum in Jakarta Old Town. The whole collection was transferred to the Government of the Republic of Indonesia in 1962.

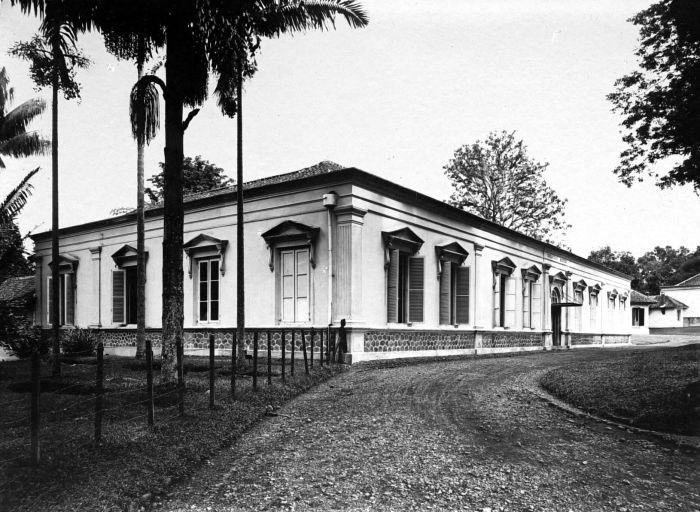
The Zoological Museum of Bogor, established in 1894 by the Batavia Society of Art and Science.

The Batavia Society of Art and Science also specialized in social sciences. In 1817 it made the plans for the Hortus Botanicus Bogoriense in Bogor. In 1894 it set up the Museum Zoologicum Bogoriense. The Bibliotheca Bogoriense made Bogor into an important center of biological science.

Except for the Radya Pustaka Museum in Surakarta (1890), no other major museums were established in the 19th century. It was only in the 1930s that local museums began to appear, usually privately initiated, by civil servants and Catholic and Protestant missionaries. These museums are praiseworthy, but are not always in expert hands, and are often run by boards which do not always function continually. Some museums suffer from the lack of regular resources, and some have disappeared completely, e.g. the Karo Museum in Berastagi, North Sumatra, set up by Dr Neuman, was abolished during the Japanese occupation (1942–45); and the Banjarmasin Museum built by Dr Malinkrodt, an expert on customs and traditions in Kalimantan, was burned down.

At the beginning of the 20th century, the colonial government became interested in the maintenance and restoration of cultural remains. In 1901 it set up the Commissie in Nederlandsch Indie voor Oudheidkundige Onderzoek van Java en Madoera, headed by Dr J. L. A. Brandes. In 1913, this became the more effective Oudheid-kundige Dienst van Nederlandsch Indie (Archaeological Service), under Professor Dr. N.J. Kromm. The government also employed officials to make a study of local languages and started the Kantoor voor Inlandsche Zaken.

In 1918 Balai Poestaka was created to publish books of literary value in Malay and local languages. Malay was taught in schools next to the local language. Prospective civil servants were obliged to study the language and customs of the region they were to work in. Training was given in Leiden, in the Netherlands. Native Indonesians also came to realize the importance of their national culture in awakening nationalism, part of a general contemporary phenomenon in Asia. This nationalism was pioneered by Budi Utomo in 1908 in the STOVIA, whose building, the School for Javanese Doctors, is converted into a museum today.

Modern technology and cultural change leads to disappearance of indigenous handicrafts. There was no longer a market for plait-work, textiles, earthenware, and brass, silver and gold objects. The result was a gradual process of cultural impoverishment. A need for money forced people to sell their heirlooms on the market, and many objects that should have been kept in Indonesia found their way to foreign countries. This condition prompted the building of the Sana Budaya Museum in Yogyakarta in 1935. Dr. F. D. K. Bosch, then Head of the Archaeology Service, and now Museum Director of the Batavia Society, first referred to cultural impoverishment, and the need for historical and cultural museums, to encourage people to appreciate their own products and to improve the quality of their handicrafts.

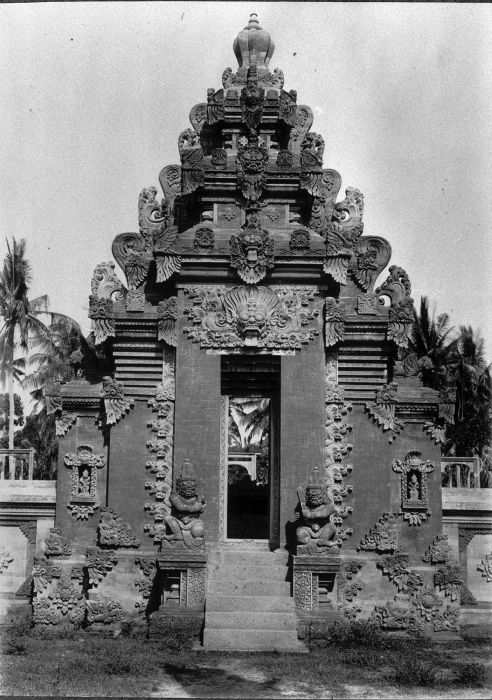
The gate of Bali Museum, built in 1931 by architect P.J. Moojen, near the location of the former royal palace of Denpasar, which had been burnt to the ground during the Dutch intervention in Bali (1906).

The late Director of the Municipal Museum of Surabaya, Von Faber, emphasized the role of museums in education. The famous painter, Walter Spies, actively helped in the creation and management of the Bali Museum in Denpasar. Unfortunately, the decision to establish museums at the time was not matched by a determination to find experts capable of managing them properly. Only a few language experts like Professor Husein Jayadiningrat and Professor Dr. Purbacaraka were interested in museums-mainly because the university produced few experts in history and the social sciences, but concentrated on training physicians, lawyers, technicians and civil servants. It was not until independence that the social sciences began to develop.

=== Japanese occupation ===
During the brief period of Japanese occupation between 1942 and 1945, there was a stimulation on Indonesian culture. One of the cultural society established by the colonial Japanese government was the Keimin Bunka Sidosho or KBS in 1943. The core policy of the KBS is to promote the cultural unity of the "Greater East Asia". Agus Jaya was appointed as head of the arts, Usmar Ismail as head of film and drama, Armijn Pane as head of literature, and Ibu Sud as head of dance and singing. The KBS actively held exhibitions and performances in big cities of the Japanese-occupied Dutch East Indies. During the three-and-a-half years of Japanese occupation, the Indonesian arts flourish with dozens of art exhibitions, performances, and awards. Among local artists member of the KBS were Emiria Sunassa, Henk Ngantung, Agus Djaya, Kartono Yudokusumo, Dullah, Basuki Resobowo, Sudiardjo, Otto Djaya, Subanto, Abdulsalam, Suyono, Surono, Siauw Tik Kwie, Ong Lian Hong, Tan Sun Tiang, Liwem Wan Gie, Harijadi S, Tan Liep Poen, Sukardi, Affandi and S. Tutur.

Another movement founded by the Japanese government was the People's Power Movement (Poesat Tenaga Rakjat, Poetera) on 9 March 1942. Even though Poetera was largely a political organization, the movement had its own cultural division, with native artist Sodjojono appointed as the head of the fine arta and cultural division.

=== Post-independence ===
The newly independent government of Indonesia established the Ministry of Education and Culture in accordance with Article 32 in the 1945 Constitution. The Department of Culture was divided into Archaeological, Art, and Language Divisions. The Art Division set up several educational institutions including the Indonesian Academy of Fine Arts in Yogyakarta (1950), the Indonesian School of Music in Yogyakarta (1952), and Karawitan Conservatoire in Surakarta (1950). In 1952, The Language Division was split into two, the first one retained the same name and the same position in the Department of Culture, the other was included in the Institute of Literature (former Instituut voor Taal en Cultuur Onderzoek, Faculteit der Lettera en Wijsbegeerte van de Universiteit van Indonesia). Also in 1952, the Department of Culture opened provincial "cultural offices" in Medan (North Sumatra), Bukit Tinggi (Central Sumatra), Palembang (South Sumatra), Jakarta, Bandung (West Java), Surabaya (East Java), Makassar (South Sulawesi), Denpasar (Bali) and Ambon (Moluccas).

In 1956, there were several changes in the Department of Culture, which include the additional responsibility of museum management (the Museum Section). Other changes were: the conversion of the Archaeological Division into the autonomous Institute of Archaeology; the Language Division in the Institute of Literature became the Language Division of the Literary Faculty of Indonesia; and the Language Division became the Sub-Division of Customs and Traditions.

Later, the Department of Culture was included into the Directorate of Culture as part of the ministerial reorganization of the 1960s. The reorganization also converted the Museum Section into the autonomous National Museum Institute. Following the reorganization, the Ministry of Education and Culture consisted of one Directorate of Culture and four autonomous institutes: Archaeology, Language & Literature, National Museums, and History & Anthropology. The responsibility of opening provincial "cultural offices" was given to the Inspectorate of Provincial Culture.

=== New Order Period ===
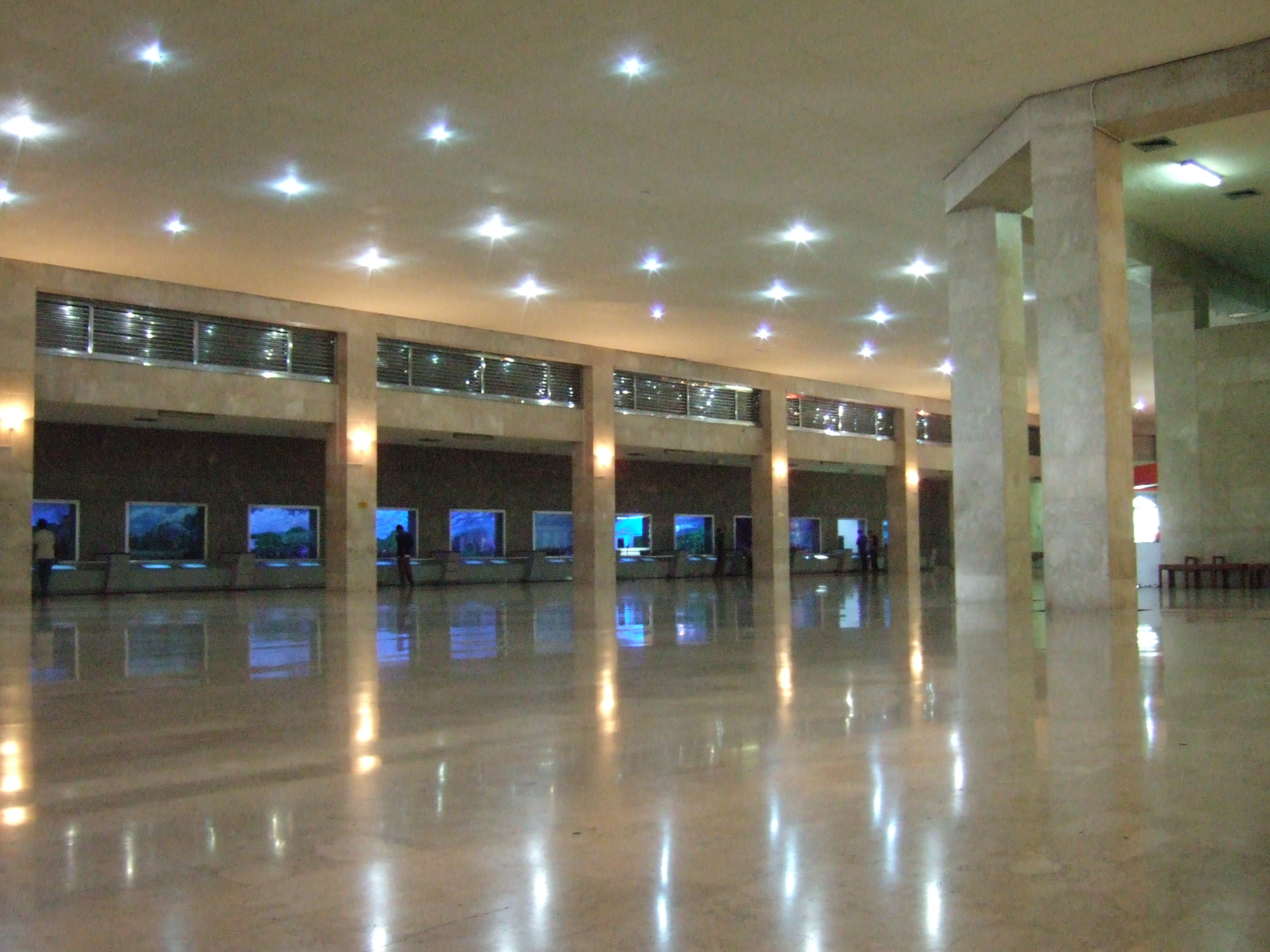
Museum of Indonesian History in Monas, one of the museums of Indonesia which extensively used dioramas which is controlled by the Armed Forces History Center.

At the start of the New Order, the regime of Suharto converted the Ministry of Education and Culture into five Directorates-General. The Directorate-General of Culture itself was divided into five directorates: Art, Cultural Education, Archaeology & History, Museums, and Language & Literature. Other restructuring occurred in 1969, reducing the Directorates-General into three; this time the Directorate-General of Culture consisted of three directorates: Art, Art Education, and Museums; and four Institutes: National Language, Archaeology, History & Anthropology, and Music & Choreography.

The New Order period also saw the expansion of the Armed Forces History Center and the encouragement of the development of museums of militaristic in nature. One of the reason for military involvement at first is because of the problem of internal divisions. This led to an accepted strategy of promoting shared values and identity across the forces through the use of a centralized military museum for older and younger generations of the soldiers. Some of these museums for which the Armed Forces was directly responsible are Satria Mandala Armed Forces Museum (opened in 1972), Museum of the Sacred Pancasila Monument (1982), Museum of Eternal Vigilance (1987), Soldiership Museum (1987), and the Museum of Communist Treachery (1993). The collection of these museums feature relics, photographs, and weapons. Dioramas are extensively used by the Armed Forces History Center, whom method was chosen because of a general lack of perceived value in historical objects in Indonesia as well as lack of funds.

=== Expansion ===
The number of museums in Indonesia in 1945 was 26 (including aquariums, zoos, and botanical gardens (following the definition of the International Council of Museums). Between 1945 and 1968, this increased to 46. In 2010 there were 281 museums in Indonesia, 80 of which are State Museums. At the beginning of 2015, the number of museums in Indonesia was 325. As of May 2015, Indonesia had 412 museums.

The Directorate for Museums introduced categories for the various collection types: there are general and special museums, there are privately maintained and state-run museums, both by the central and provincial governments. Those museums kept by the central government in the main operate under the administration of the Ministry of Education and Culture. Military museums are supervised by the Defence Ministry.

The most frequent type is the General Provincial Museum (Museum Umum Propinsi) which exists in almost all provincial capitals. These museums usually consist of several sections: natural history (geological, biology), ethnography, and history. Objects are sometimes flatly arranged in display cases with poor explanations. More recently established museums have already achieved higher standards with thoughtful and appealing expositions.

In Indonesia, the increase in the number of museums has not yet been matched by an increase in quality. Buildings are often unsuitable for display and for socio-educational activities; competent staffs are lacking; the public does not yet appreciate the educational role of museums; funds are lacking to maintain collections and extend building; and so on. There are not enough museums for 120 million inhabitants and a large number of State and private universities. Big cities like Jakarta, Medan, Surabaya, Bandung and Semarang need centers for science and culture, and museums as places of study and leisure.

== Museums by region ==
=== Jakarta ===
Jakarta contains the most museums in Indonesia with over 50 museums within its 661 square kilometers area. The museums in Jakarta cluster around the Central Jakarta Merdeka Square area, Jakarta Old Town, and Taman Mini Indonesia Indah.

The Jakarta Old Town contains museums that are former institutional buildings of Colonial Batavia. Some of the notable museums are: Jakarta History Museum (former City Hall of Batavia), Wayang Museum (former Church of Batavia), the Fine Art and Ceramic Museum (former Court House of Justice of Batavia), the Maritime Museum (former Sunda Kelapa warehouse), Bank Indonesia Museum (former De Javasche Bank), and Bank Mandiri Museum (former Netherlands Trading Society).

Several museums clustered in central Jakarta around the Merdeka Square area include: National Museum of Indonesia, Monas, Istiqlal Islamic Museum in Istiqlal mosque, and Jakarta Cathedral Museum on the second floor of Jakarta Cathedral. Also in the central Jakarta area is the Taman Prasasti Museum (former cemetery of Batavia), and Textile Museum in Tanah Abang area.

The recreational area of Taman Mini Indonesia Indah in East Jakarta contains almost twenty museums since the 1970s within its complex.

==== North Jakarta and Thousand Islands ====
- Maritime Museum
- Onrust Archaeology Park

==== West Jakarta ====
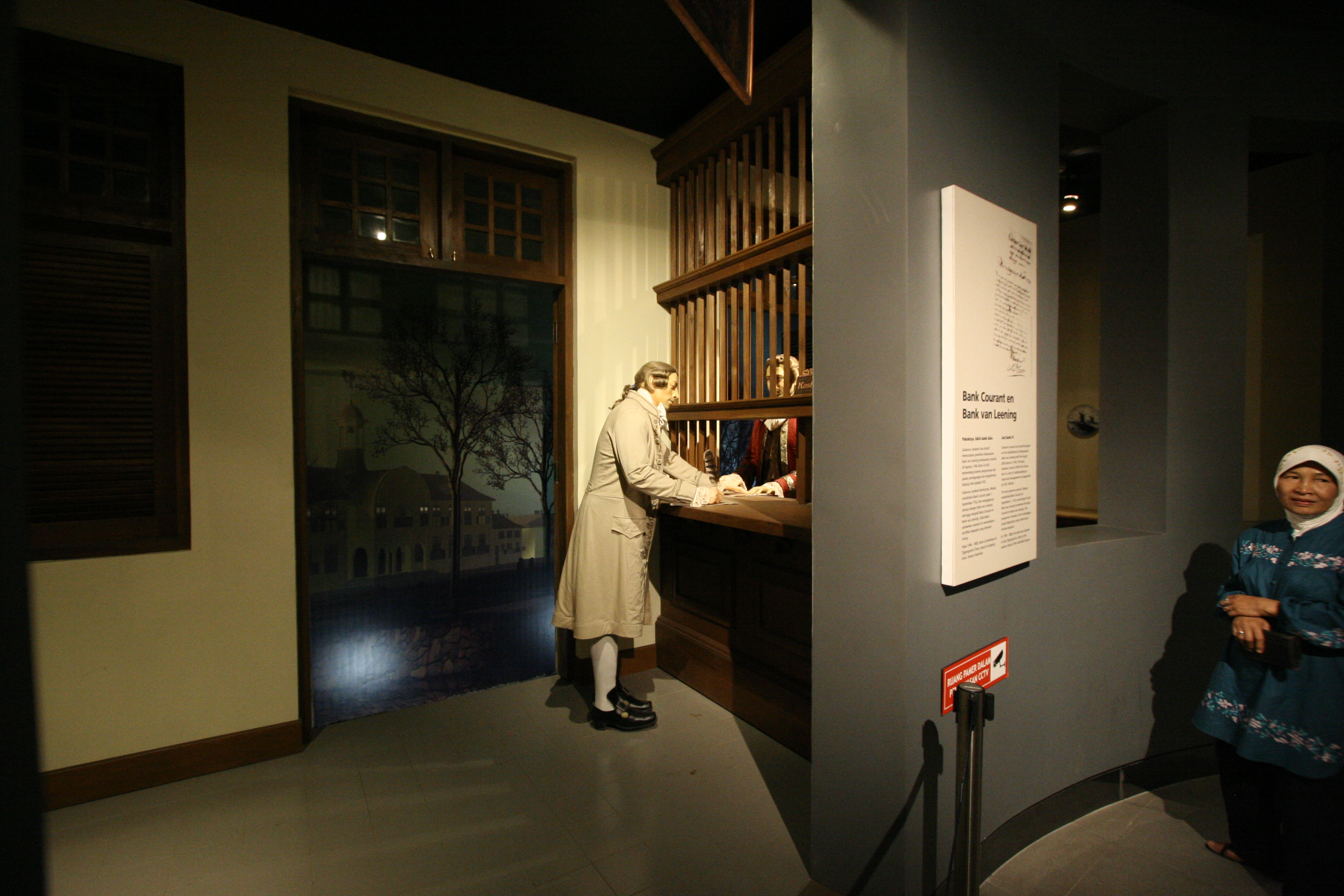
A mock up of Dutch East Indies bank in Bank Indonesia Museum.

- Jakarta Old Town
  - Bank Indonesia Museum
  - Mandiri Museum
  - Fine Art and Ceramic Museum
  - Jakarta History Museum or Museum Fatahillah
  - Wayang Museum
- Jakarta Textile Museum
- Museum Lukisan Universitas Pelita Harapan
- Museum 12 Mei Universitas Trisakti
- The Museum of Modern and Contemporary Art in Nusantara

==== Central Jakarta ====
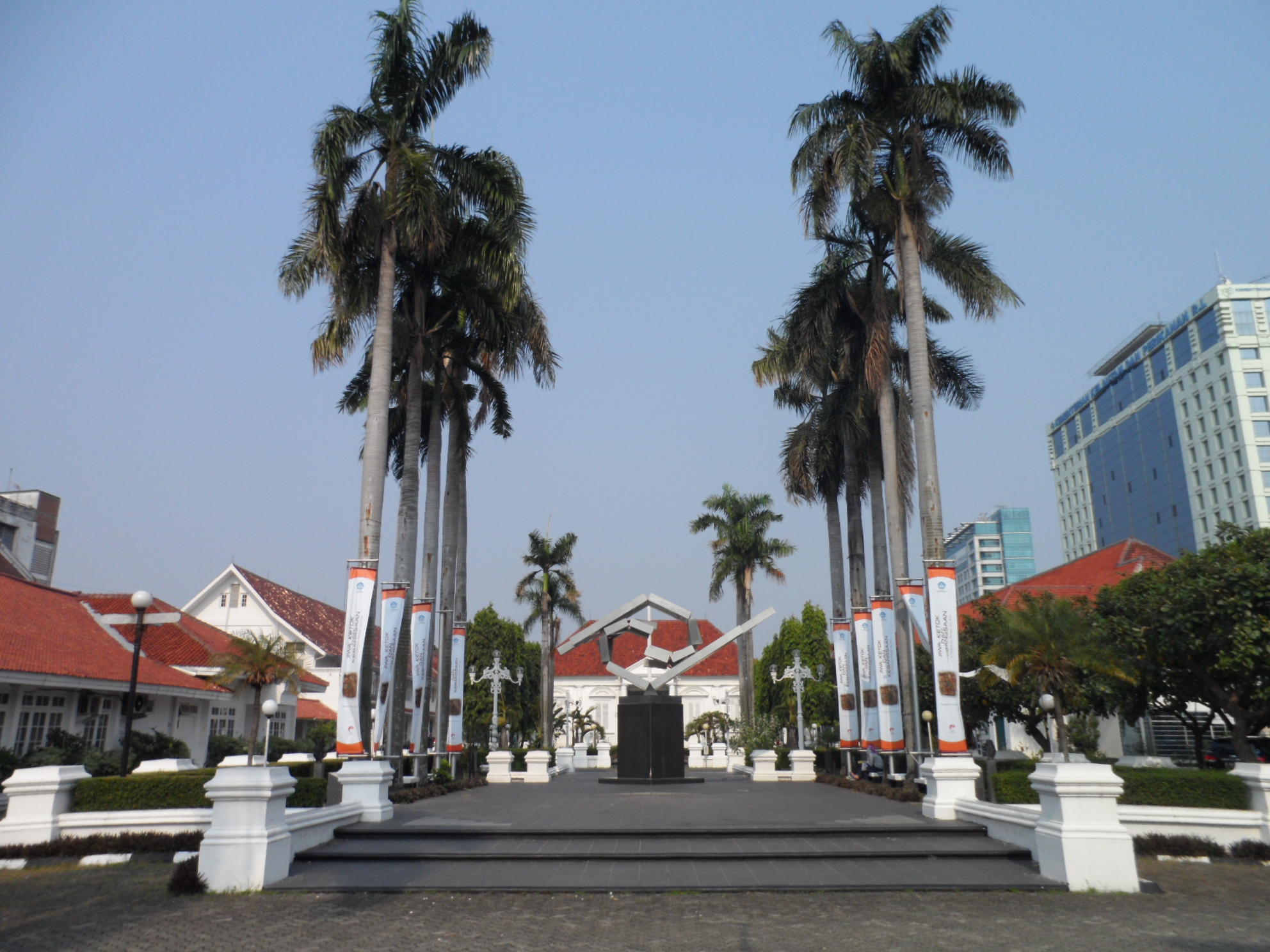
National Gallery of Indonesia

- Bentara Budaya Jakarta
- Formulation of Proclamation Text Museum (the site where the text of the nation's proclamation of independence was composed in 1945)
- Gedung Joang '45
- Gedung Kesenian Jakarta
- Gedung Mohammad Hoesni Thamrin
- Jakarta Cathedral Museum
- Jakarta Planetarium
- Museum of Indonesian History in Monas
- Museum Adam Malik (1985, closed in 2005)
- Museum Anatomi Fakultas Kedokteran Universitas Indonesia
- Museum Jenderal Besar Abdul Haris Nasution
- Museum Kebangkitan Nasional
- Museum Pers ANTARA
- Museum Puri Bhakti Renatama
- Museum Sasmita Loka Jenderal Ahmad Yani
- Museum Sumpah Pemuda
- National Gallery of Indonesia
- National Museum or Museum Gajah
- Taman Prasasti Museum

==== East Jakarta ====
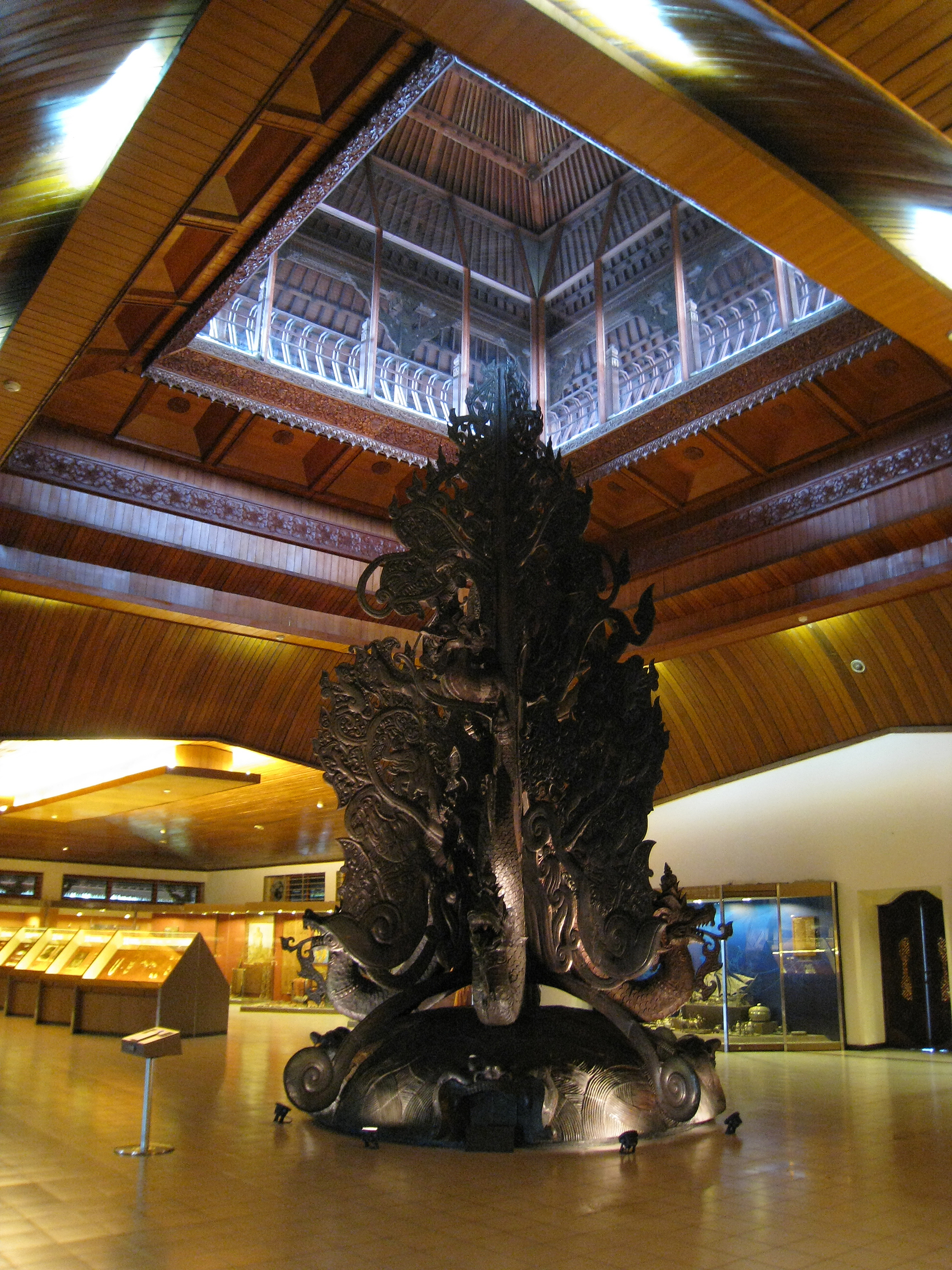
The Kalpataru Tree Hall in the Indonesia Museum, Taman Mini Indonesia Indah.

- Museum Loka Jala Srana
- Museum of PKI Treason
- Monument of Sacred Pancasila
- Taman Mini Indonesia Indah
  - Asmat Museum
  - Indonesian Hakka Museum, formal opening at August 30, 2014
  - Indonesia Museum
  - Indonesia Soldiership Museum
  - Indonesia Stamp Museum
  - Insect Museum and Butterfly Park
  - Istiqlal Museum
  - Komodo Indonesian Fauna Museum and Reptile Park
  - Museum of Electricity and New Energy
  - Museum of Heirloom
  - Museum of Lighting
  - Museum of Science and Technology
  - Museum of Transportation
  - Oil and Natural Gas Museum
  - Purna Bhakti Pertiwi Museum
  - Timor Timur Museum

==== South Jakarta ====
- Basoeki Abdullah Museum
- Harry Dharsono Museum
- Kites Museum of Indonesia
- Museum Dirgantara Mandala
- Museum Kriminal (Mabak)
- Museum Manggala Wanabhakti
- Polri Museum
- Ragunan Zoo
- Reksa Artha Museum
- Satria Mandala Museum

=== Java ===
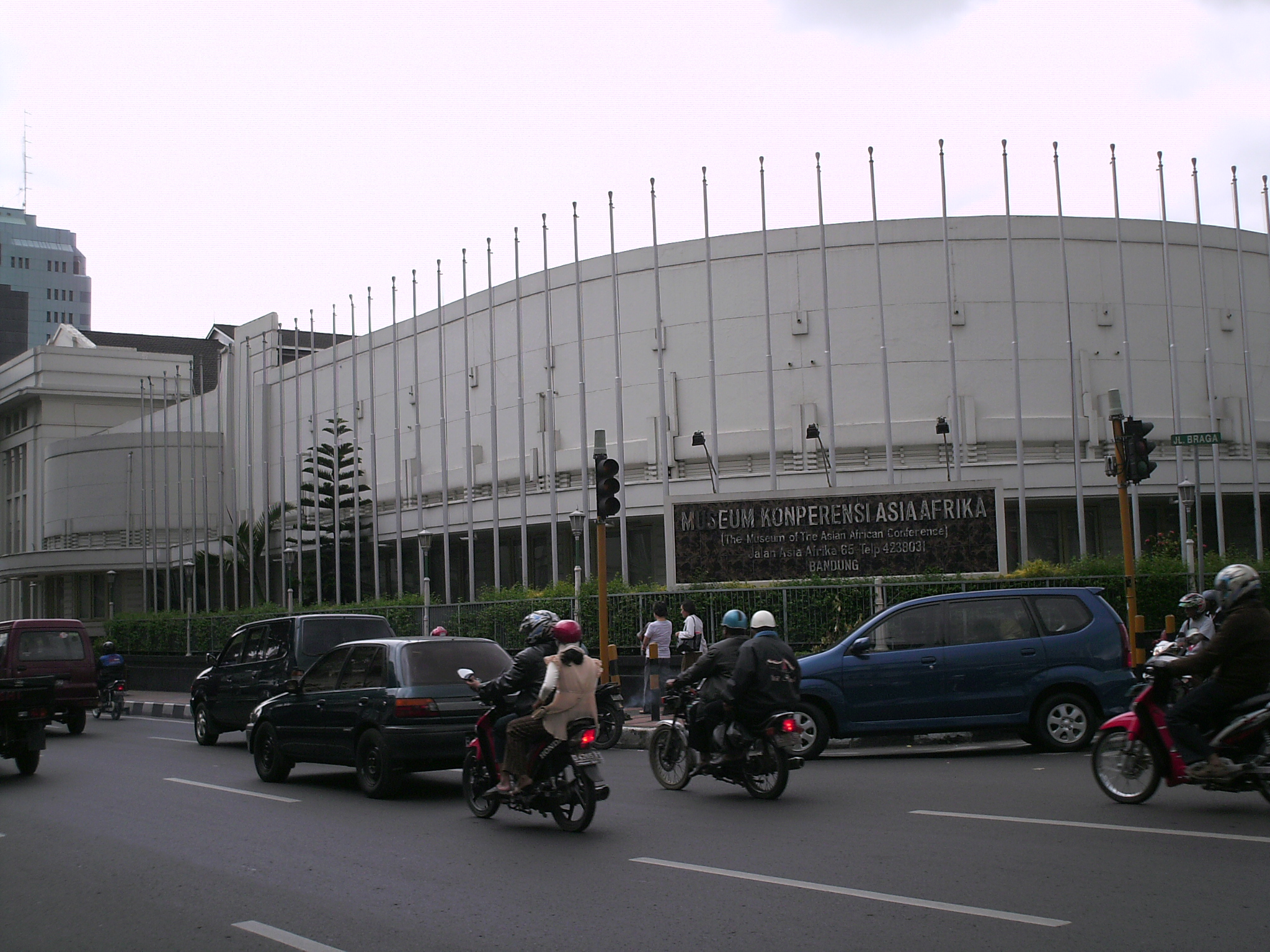
Asian-African Conference Museum

==== Banten ====
- Benteng Heritage Museum, Tangerang

==== West Java ====
- Amerta Dirgantara Museum, Subang
- Asian–African Conference Museum, Bandung (1980)
- Bandung Geological Museum, Bandung (1928)
- Bandung Zoo, Bandung (1933)
- Barli Museum, Bandung
- Bogor Botanical Garden, Bogor (1817)
- Bogor Zoological Museum, Bogor (1894)
- Cibodas Botanical Garden, Cibodas (1852)
- Ethnobotanical Museum, Bogor
- Indonesia Post Museum, Bandung
- Kraton Kacirebonan Museum, Cirebon
- Kraton Kasepuhan Museums, Cirebon:
  - Museum Diorama Bale Panyawangan, Purwakarta (2015)
  - Museum Kereta Singa Barong
  - Museum Benda Kuno
- Museum Linggarjati, Kuningan
- Museum Palangan B. Kokosan, Sukabumi
- Pembela Tanah Air Museum, Bogor
- Museum Bank Indonesia, Bandung
- Museum Perjuangan Jawa Barat, Bandung
- Museum Perjuangan Jawa Barat, Bogor
- Museum Prabu Geusan Ulun, Purwakarta
- Museum Tanah Nasrel, Bogor
- Percandian Batujaya Museum, Karawang
- Sri Baduga Museum, Bandung (1980)
- Tambaksari's Site Museum, Ciamis
- Wangsit Mandala Siliwangi Museum

==== Central Java ====
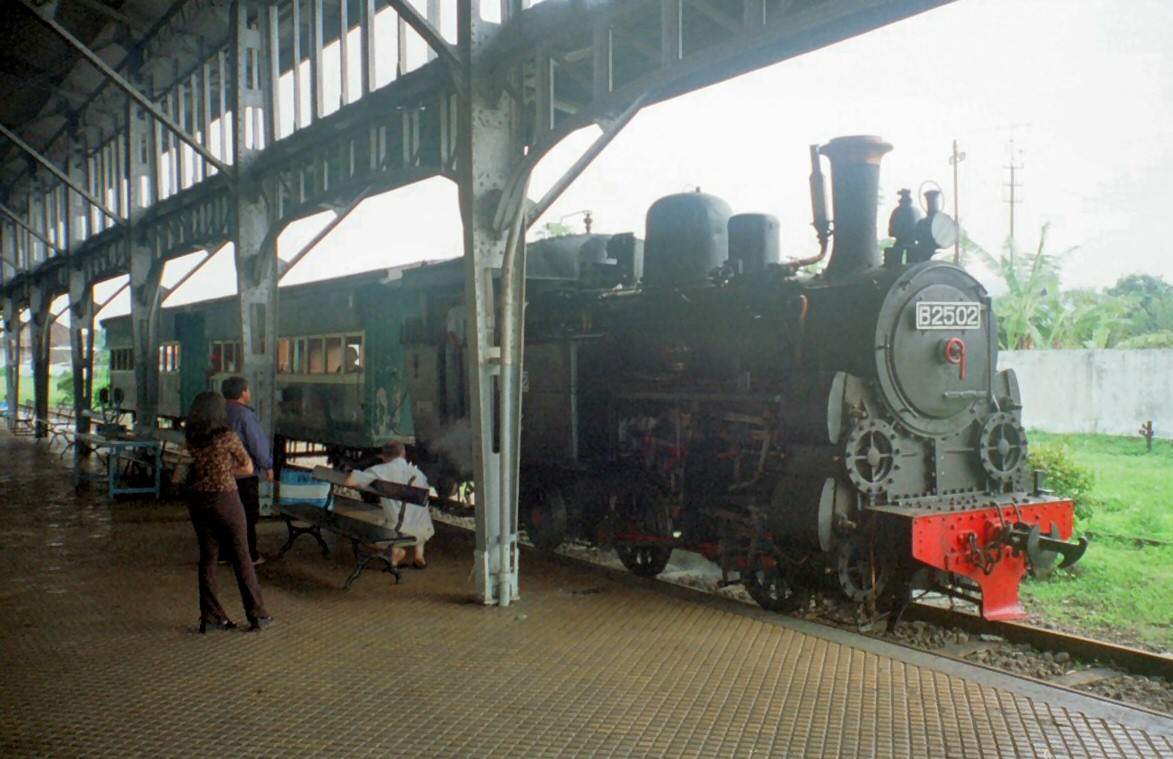
A colonial period locomotive in Ambarawa Railway Museum with its preserved track.

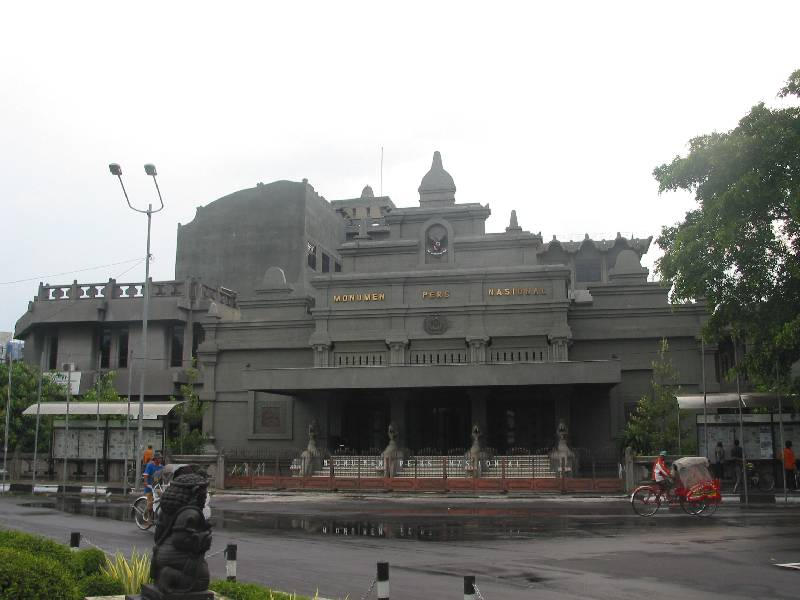
National Museum of Press in Solo.

- Ambarawa Railway Museum, Ambarawa
- Borobudur Complex, Magelang
  - Karmawibhangga Museum (1983)
  - Samudra Raksa Museum (2005)
- Danar Hadi Batik Museum, Surakarta (2008)
- Indonesian World Records Museum, Semarang
- Keraton Surakarta Museum, Surakarta
- Kretek Museum, Kudus
- National Press Monument and Museum, Surakarta
- Pekalongan Batik Museum, Pekalongan (1972)
- Radya Pustaka Museum, Surakarta (1890)
- Ranggawarsita Museum, Semarang
- Sangiran archeology museum, Sangiran
- Tumurun Private Museum, Surakarta

==== Special Region of Yogyakarta ====
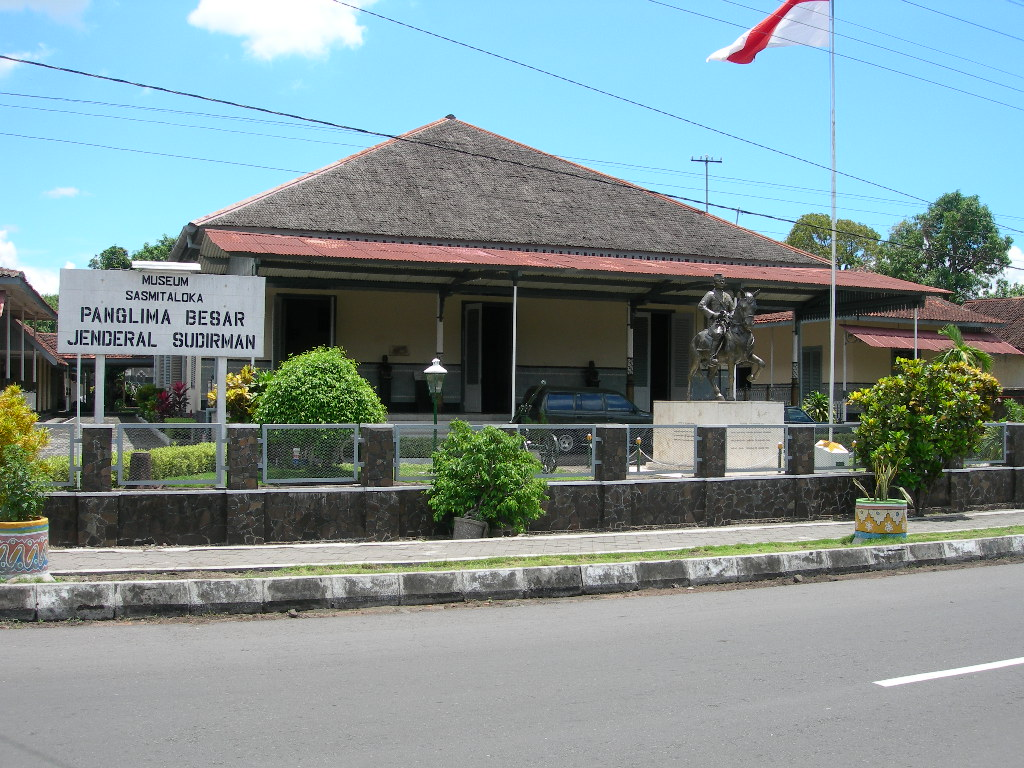
Museum Sasmitaloka Panglima Besar Jenderal Soedirman.

Due to the importance of Yogyakarta during the war of independence from the Dutch, there are numerous memorials and museums. Monument Yogya Kembali and Fort Vredeburg Museum are two major museums of about 11 named in the city.

- Affandi Museum
- Code Museum
- Dewantara Kirti Griya Museum
- Dharma Wiratama Museum
- Dirgantara Mandala Museum
- Fort Vredeburg Museum
- Gembira Loka Zoo
- Jogja National Museum
- Kraton Yogyakarta Museum
  - Hamengkubuwono IX Museum
  - Train Museum
- Monumen Pahlawan Pancasila
- Museum Batik "Ciptowening"
- Museum Karbol TNI Angkatan Udara
- Museum Kayu Wanagama
- Museum Kebun Raya Gembira Loka
- Museum of Biology Gadjah Mada University
- Museum of Geotechnology and Mineral
- Museum Pergerakan Wanita
- Museum Perjuangan Yogyakarta
- Museum Purbakala Pleret
- Museum Pura Paku Alaman
- Museum R.S. Mata "Dr. Yap"
- Museum Tani Jawa Indonesia
- Museum Tembi (Rumah Budaya Tembi)
- Nyoman Gunarsa Museum
- Prambanan Museum
- Museum Sasmitaloka Panglima Besar (Pangsar) Jenderal Sudirman
- Sonobudoyo Museum (1939)
- Sasana Wiratama
- Taman Budaya Yogyakarta
  - Museum Anak Kolong Tangga
- Ullen Sentalu Museum
- Wayang Kekayon Museum
- Yogyakarta Batik Museum
- Yogya Kembali Museum, Sleman Regency
- Museum Sandi

==== East Java ====
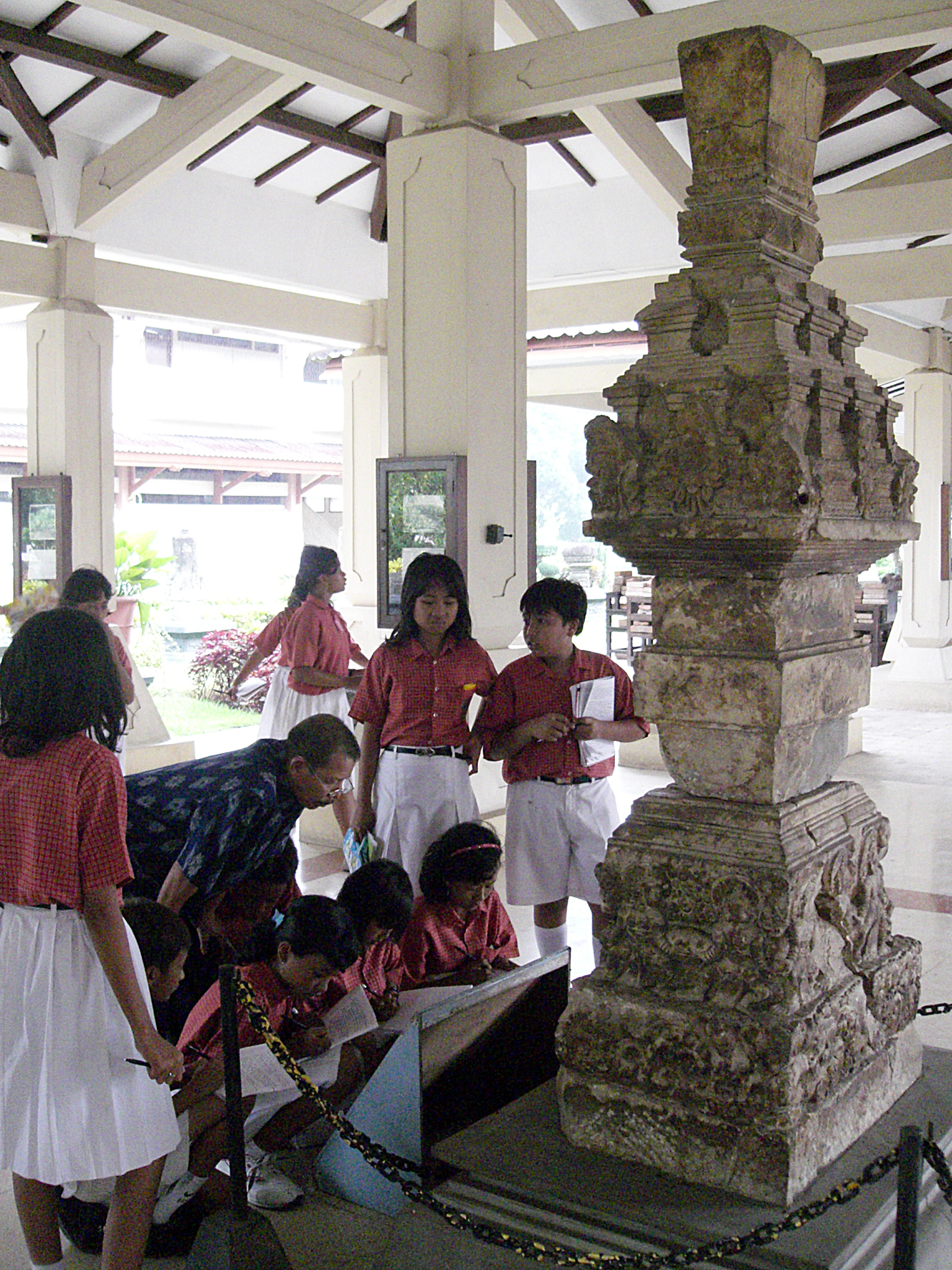
School children in Trowulan Museum.

- 10th November Museum, Surabaya
- Airlangga Museum, Kediri
- Bank Indonesia Museum, Surabaya
- Batu Secret Zoo, Batu
- Brawijaya Museum, Malang
- Health Museum of Dr. Adhyatma, Surabaya
- House of Sampoerna, Surabaya
- Mpu Tantular State Museum, Buduran, Sidoarjo
- Museum Angkut, Batu
- Malang Tempo Doeloe Museum, Malang
- Mpu Tantular Museum, Sidoarjo
- Indonesian Islamic Museum K.H. Hasyim Asy'ari, Jombang
- Nahdlatul Ulama Museum, Surabaya
- Submarine Monument, Surabaya
- Surabaya Zoo, Surabaya
- Trowulan Museum, Trowulan (1987)
- Bondowoso Rail and Train Museum, Bondowoso Regency

=== Lesser Sunda Islands ===
==== Bali ====
- Agung Rai Museum of Art
- Bali Botanic Garden, Bedugul (1959)
- Bali Museum (1930)
- Blanco Renaissance Museum
- Buleleng Museum, Singaraja
- Le Mayeur Museum, Sanur
- Museum Pasifika
- Museum Rudana
- Museum Semarajaya
- Neka Art Museum, Ubud (1982)
- Gedong Arca Museum
- Puri Lukisan Museum

==== West Nusa Tenggara ====
- West Nusa Tenggara State Museum (1982)

==== East Nusa Tenggara ====
- East Nusa Tenggara State Museum

=== Sumatra ===
Most museums in Sumatra are ethnographic musea specializing in cultural heritage e.g. textiles and other traditional artifacts.

==== Aceh ====
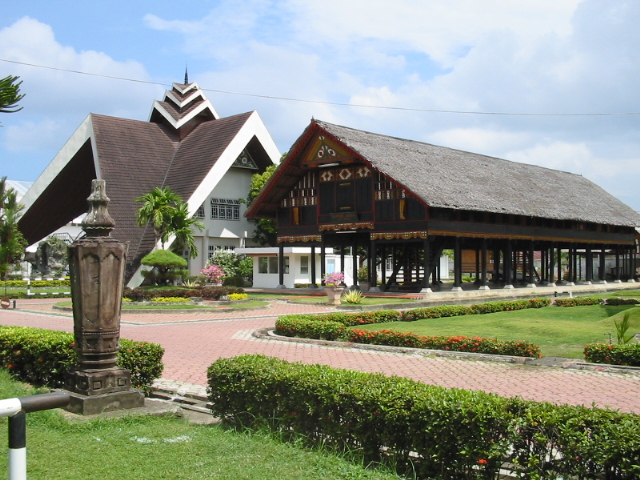
Aceh Museum

Aceh Tsunami Museum, Banda Aceh.

- Aceh Museum, Banda Aceh (1915)
- Aceh Tsunami Museum, Banda Aceh (2009)
- Cut Nyak Dhien Mansion Museum
- Museum Malikussaleh, Lhokseumawe

==== North Sumatra ====
- Batak Museum, Balige
- Maimun Palace Museum, Medan
- Museum Huta Bolon Simanindo, Simanindo
- Museum Joang '45, Medan
- Museum Perjuangan TNI Kodam I Bukit Barisan, Medan (1971)
- Museum Rumah Bolon Pematang Purba, Pematang purba
- Museum Simalungun, Pematangsiantar (1940)
- Nias Heritage Museum, Gunungsitoli (1991). The only museum in Nias, was destroyed by the Boxing Day Tsunami. A new building for the museum has been constructed.
- North Sumatra Museum, Medan (1982)
- Sumatran Numismatic Museum, Medan (2017)
- TB Silalahi Center, Balige Subdistrict (2008)
- Tjong A Fie Mansion Museum, Medan
- Zoological Museum of Pematangsiantar, Pematangsiantar (1936)

==== Riau Province and Riau Islands ====
- Bagansiapiapi Chinese Museum, Bagansiapiapi
- Bagansiapiapi Fish Museum, Bagansiapiapi
- Bagansiapiapi History Museum, Bagansiapiapi
- Bagansiapiapi Muslim Museum, Bagansiapiapi
- Museum Kandil Riau, Tanjung Pinang (1988)
- Museum Sang Nila Utama, Pekanbaru (1994)
- Siak Sri Indrapura Palace Museum, Indrapura (Building from 1889)
- Museum Sultan Sulaiman Badrul Alamsyah, Tanjung Pinang

==== West Sumatra ====
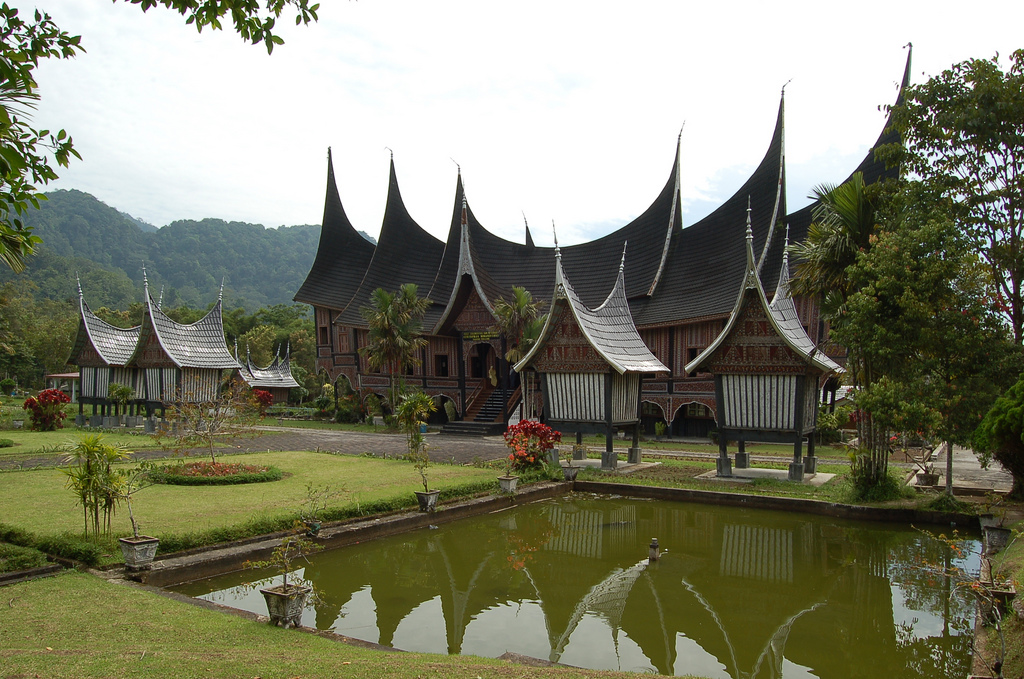
Rumah Gadang, a traditional Minang house of West Sumatra in the Information Center of Minangkabau Culture, Padang Panjang.

- Adityawarman Museum, Padang (1977)
- Bung Hatta Museum, Bukittinggi
- Buya Hamka Birthplace Museum, Agam (2001)
- Tri Daya Eka Dharma Museum, Bukittinggi
- 30 September 2009 Earthquake Museum, Padang (2012)
- Gedung Joang '45, Padang
- Goedang Ransoem Museum, Sawahlunto
- Galeri Tambang Mbah Soero, Sawahlunto
- Information Center of Minangkabau Culture, Padang Panjang (1990)
- Museum Rumah Adat Baanjuang, Fort de Kock, Bukittinggi
- Railway Museum, Sawahlunto
- Museum Taman Bundo Kandung, Bukittinggi (1934)
- Museum Tri Daya Eka Dharma, Bukittinggi (1973)
- Bukittinggi Zoological Museum, Bukittinggi
- Pagaruyung Palace Museum
- Rumah Puisi Taufiq Ismail, Tanah Datar
- Rumah Kelahiran Tan Malaka, Lima Puluh Kota
- Rasuna Said Mansion Museum

==== Bengkulu ====
- Bengkulu State Museum
- Fort Marlborough, Bengkulu City

==== Jambi ====
- Jambi Museum, Jambi City (1988)
- Muaro Jambi Temple Compounds Site Museum, Muaro Jambi Regency
- Museum Perjuangan Rakyat Jambi, Jambi City (1993)

==== South Sumatra and Bangka–Belitung Islands ====
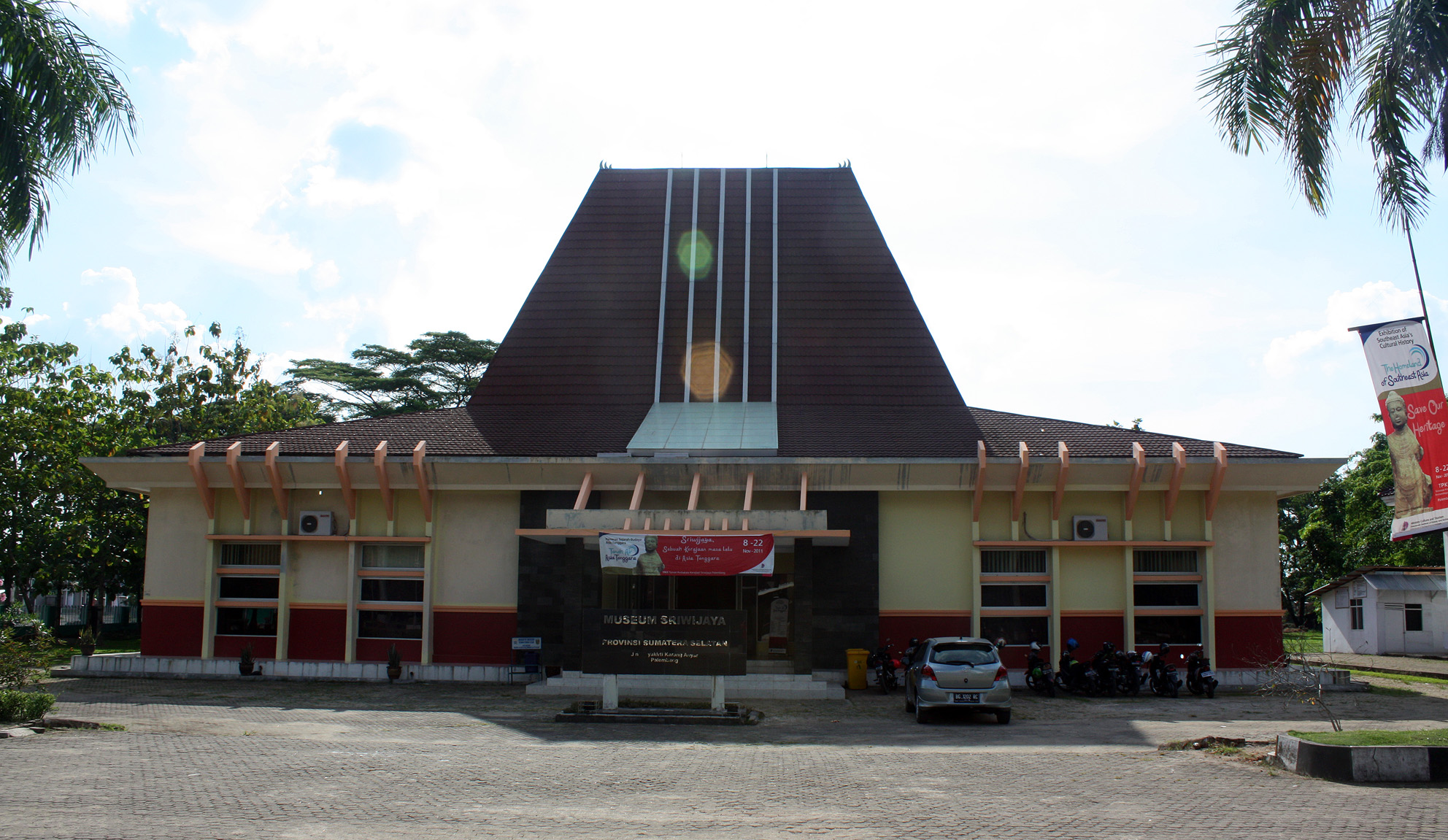
Sriwijaya Museum on the Sriwijaya Kingdom Archaeological Park.

- Al-Qur'an Al-Akbar Museum
- Balaputradeva Museum, Palembang
- Museum Monpera, Palembang
- Museum UPT Belitung, Belitung
- Sriwijaya Kingdom Archaeological Park, Palembang
- Sultan Mahmud Badaruddin II Museum, Palembang
- Textile Museum, Palembang
- Word Museum, Belitung

==== Lampung ====
- Ruwa Jurai Museum, Bandar Lampung (1988)

=== Kalimantan ===
Most museums in Kalimantan specialized on cultural heritage such as textiles and other traditional artifacts. In South Kalimantan, most museums are shaped like the traditional Banjar house.

==== Central Kalimantan ====
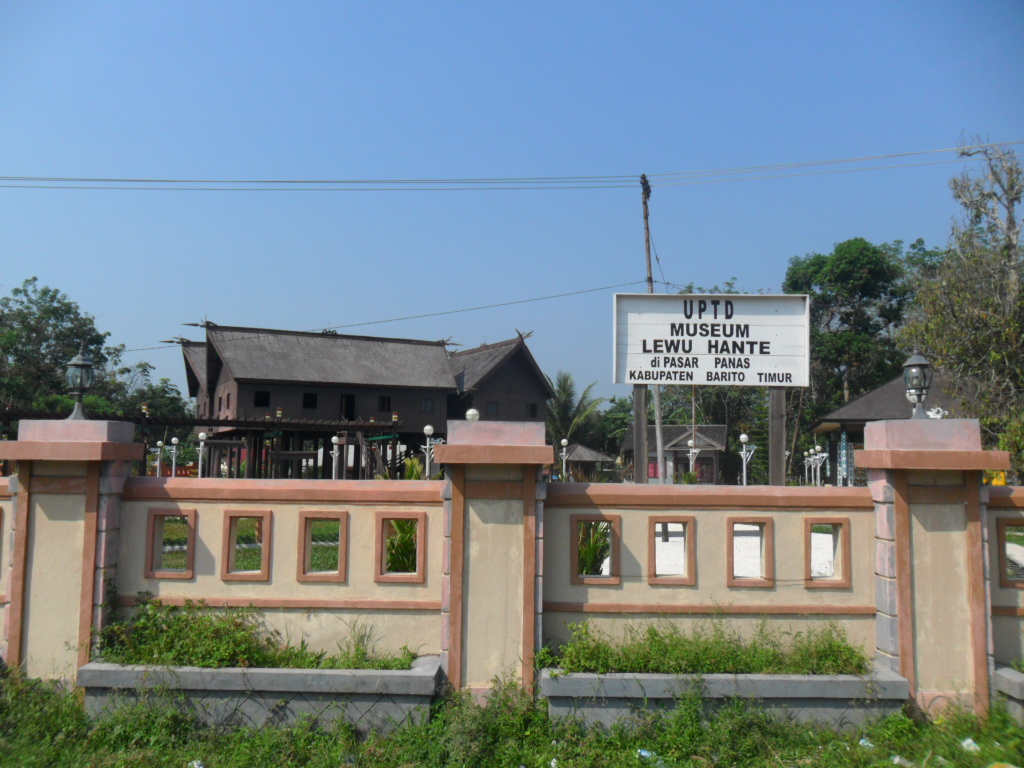
Museum Lewu Hante.

- Balanga Museum, Palangkaraya
- Kayu Sampit Museum, East Kotawaringin Regency
- Lewu Hante Museum, Pasar Panas, East Barito Regency

==== North Kalimantan ====
- Bulungan Sultanate Museum, Bulungan Regency

==== East Kalimantan ====
- Kalimantan Art Gallery, Samarinda
- Mulawarman State Museum, Tenggarong Subdistrict
- Museum Batiwakkal, Gunung Tabur Subdistrict, Berau Regency
- Museum Kayu Tuah Himba, Tenggarong Subdistrict
- Museum Perjuangan Merah Putih, Sanga-Sanga Subdistrict
- Sadurengas Museum, Paser Belengkong Subdistrict
- Sendawar Museum, West Kutai Regency

==== South Kalimantan ====
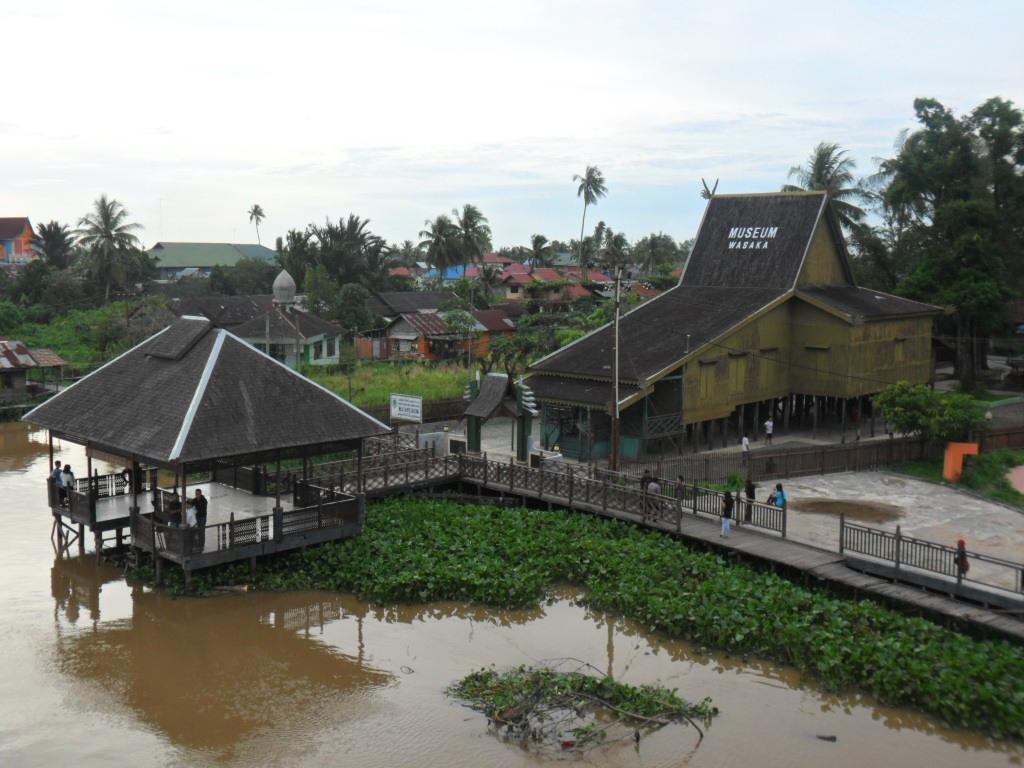
Wasaka Museum in Banjarmasin.

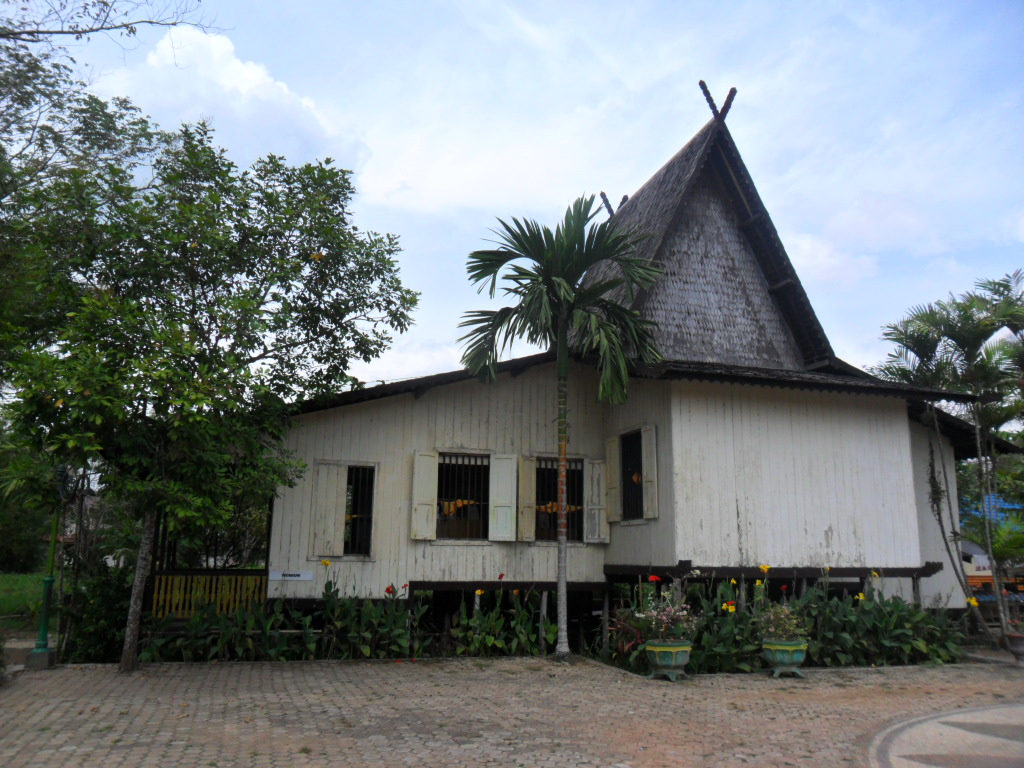
Candi Agung Museum in Amuntai town.

- Candi Agung Museum, Amuntai, North Hulu Sungai Regency
- Lambung Mangkurat State Museum, Banjarbaru
- Wasaka Museum, Banjarmasin

==== West Kalimantan ====
- West Kalimantan Provincial Museum, Pontianak
- Museum Dara Juanti, Sintang
- Museum Istana Kadriyah, Pontianak
- Museum Kapuas Raya, Sintang

=== Sulawesi ===
Most museums in Sulawesi specialize in cultural heritage such as textiles and other traditional artifacts.

==== North Sulawesi ====
- Manado Wanua Paksinata North Sulawesi Provincial Museum, Manado

==== Central Sulawesi ====
- Kaili Souraja Museum, Kaili
- Souraja, Palu
- Palu Central Sulawesi Provincial Museum, Palu

==== South Sulawesi ====
- Museum Batara Guru, Wara Utama Subdistrict
- Museum Indo' Ta'dung, Kete Kesu, Toraja Utara
- Museum La Galigo, Fort Rotterdam, Makassar
- Sungguminasa Balla Lompoa Museum, near Ujung Pandang

==== Southeast Sulawesi ====
- Buton Palace Museum, Baubau, Buton Island
- Southeast Sulawesi State Museum, Kendari

=== The Moluccas ===
Ambon was the site of the first recorded museum in Indonesia, a botanical museum built by Georg Eberhard Rumphius in 1662. Nothing remains of it except books written by himself, which are now in the library of the National Museum of Indonesia.

Today, museums in the Moluccas specialize in Ambonese ethnography or artifacts from the earlier Sultanates in the Moluccas.

==== Maluku ====
- Siwa Lima State Museum, Ambon (1973)

==== Maluku Islands ====
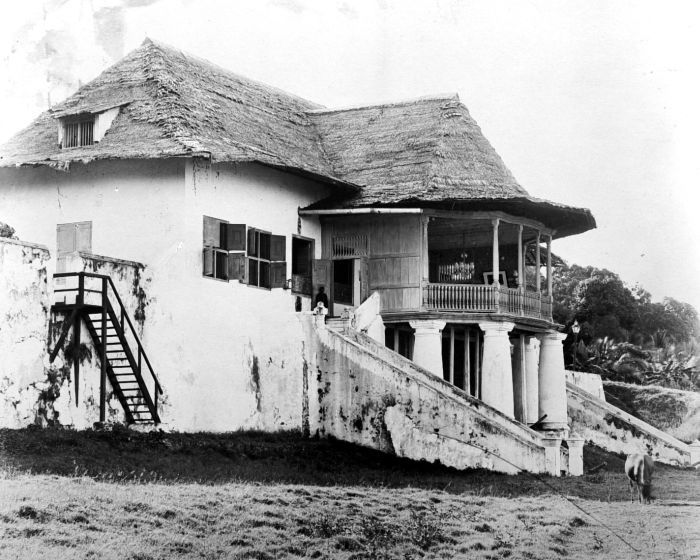
Kedaton Museum, established in the former palace of the Ternate Sultanates.

- Kedaton Sultan Ternate Museum, Kota Ternate Utara Subdistrict, Ternate (1982)
- Sonyie Malige Museum, Tidore
- World War II and Trikora Museum, Morotai

=== Papua ===
==== Papua province ====
- Asmat Museum of Culture and Progress, Agats (1973)
- Loka Budaya Museum, Cenderawasih University, Jayapura (1973)
- Papua Province State Museum, Jayapura (1983)

== See also ==
- Tourism in Indonesia
- Culture of Indonesia
- List of museums

== Cited works ==
- Bentara Budaya Jakarta (2008). The Journey of Indonesian Painting: The Bentara Budaya Collection. Kepustakaan Populer Gramedia. ISBN 9789799101204.
- Directorate-General of Culture, Ministry of Education & Culture of the Republic of Indonesia (1973). Cultural Policy in Indonesia (PDF). Paris: UNESCO.
- Jones, Tod (2013). Culture, Power, and Authoritarianism in the Indonesian State: Cultural Policy across the Twentieth Century to the Reform Era. Southeast Asia Mediated. BRILL. ISBN 9789004255104.
- McGregor, Katharine E. (2007). History in Uniform: Military Ideology and the Construction of Indonesia's Past. Singapore: NUS Press. ISBN 9789971693602.
