= Kite Museum =

Kite Museum may refer to:

- Kite Museum (Johor) in Johor, Malaysia
- Kite Museum (Malacca) in Malacca, Malaysia
- Patang Kite Museum at Sanskar Kendra, Ahmedabad, India
- Kites Museum of Indonesia, a museum in Pondok Labu, South Jakarta
