= Museum Sang Nila Utama =

Sang Nila Utama Museum
- Museum Sang Nila Utama
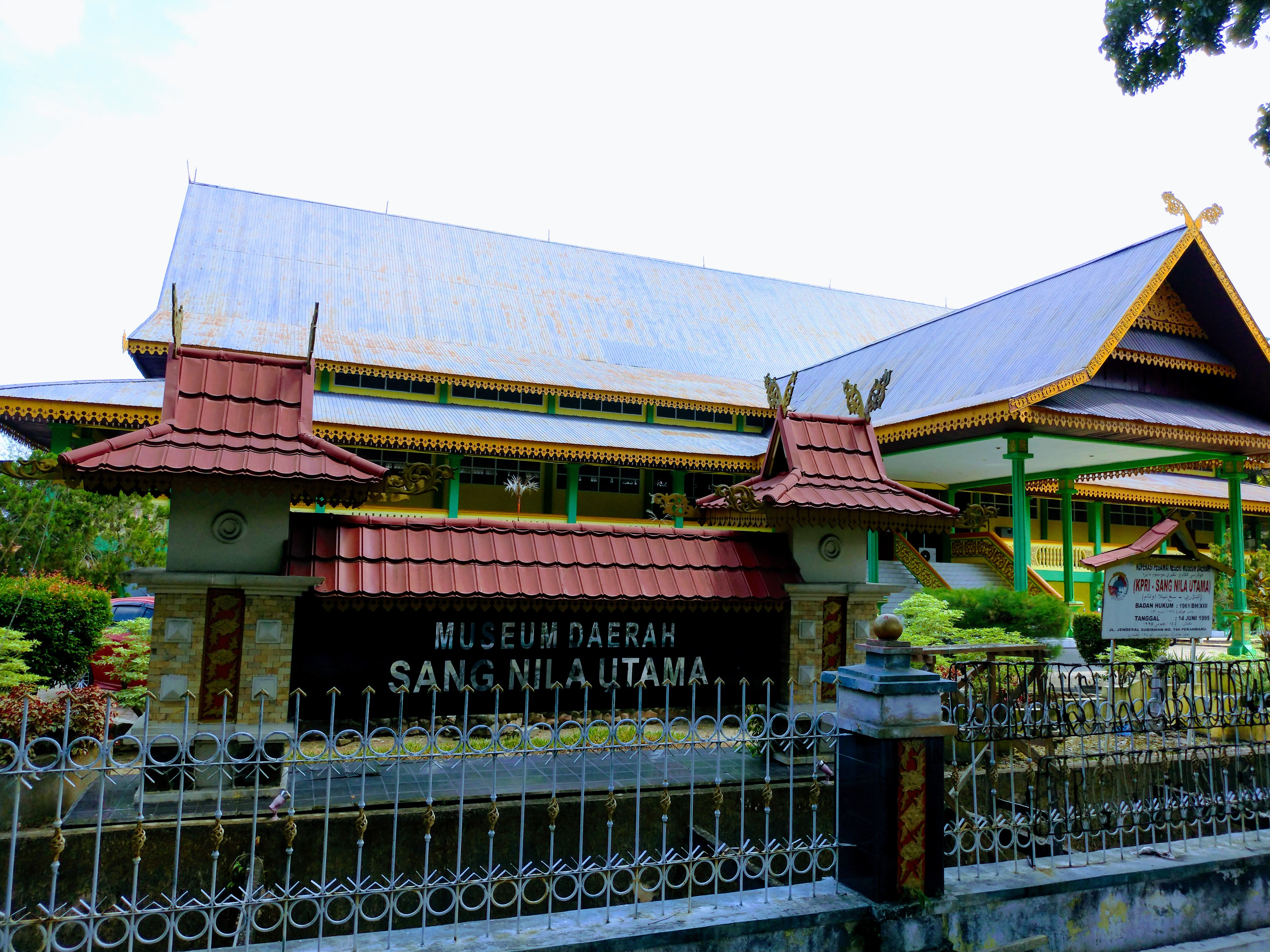
- Established: 1994
- Location: Jl. Sudirman, Pekanbaru, Indonesia
- Coordinates: 0.494258°N 101.45418°E
- Type: Heritage centre
- Collection size: 4298 Riau-Malay artifacts

Museum Sang Nila Utama is a heritage museum in Pekanbaru, Indonesia. The museum collects item related to the Riau-Malay culture such as Malay wedding costumes, traditional toys, musical instruments and other traditional artifacts. Not far from the museum is an exhibition and performance building called the Gedung Taman Budaya Riau ("Riau Cultural Park Building).

The name Sang Nila Utama is derived from a Srivijayan prince from Palembang who founded the Kingdom of Singapore in 1299.

== See also ==
- List of museums and cultural institutions in Indonesia
