= Museum Huta Bolon Simanindo =

Museum in North Sumatra, Indonesia

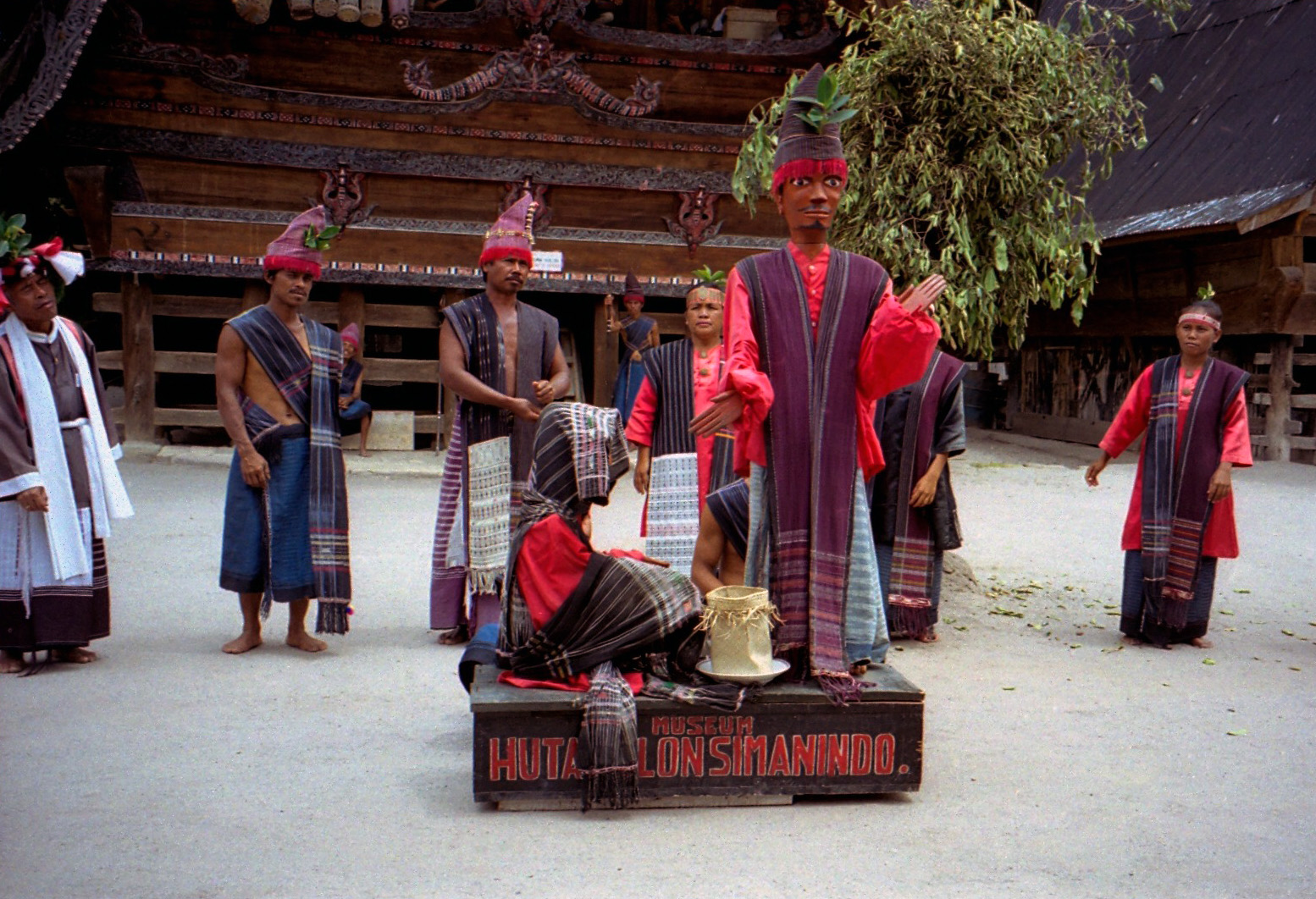
Sigale gale, life-size puppet performance

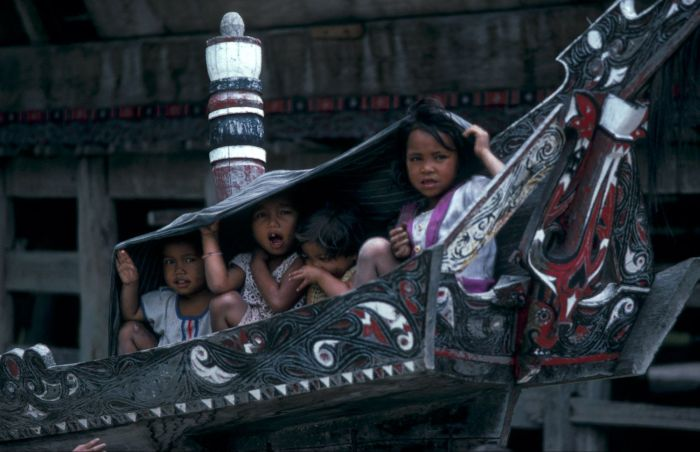
Toba Batak in a canoe

Huta Bolon Museum of Simanindo is a museum on in the village of Simanindo on Samosir Island in Samosir Regency, North Sumatra, Indonesia. The museum is housed in the former home of Rajah Simalungun, a Batak king who had 14 wives. The roof was decorated with 10 buffalo horns representing the 10 generations of the dynasty. The museum's collection includes brass cooking utensils, weapons, crockery from the Dutch and Chinese, sculptures, and Batak carvings. Dance performances are given daily and audience participation encouraged.

== See also ==
- List of museums in Indonesia
