= Sasana Wiratama =

Indonesian's Museum

- Sasana Wiratama ꦱꦱꦤꦮꦶꦫꦠꦩ
- Location in Yogyakarta
- Location: Jalan HOS Cokroaminoto TR III/430, Yogyakarta 55244, Indonesia
- Coordinates: 7.78713°S 110.351395°E

Sasana Wiratama (Javanese: ꦱꦱꦤꦮꦶꦫꦠꦩ), also known as Museum Monumen Pangeran Diponegoro (Diponegoro Monument Museum; Javanese: ꦩꦸꦱꦶꦪꦸꦩ꧀ꦩꦺꦴꦤꦸꦩꦺꦤ꧀ꦥꦔꦺꦫꦤ꧀ꦢꦶꦥꦤꦼꦒꦫ, romanized: Musiyum Monumèn Pangéran Dipanegara) is a museum complex in Yogyakarta, Indonesia. The complex consists of a museum and a monument which commemorates the struggle of Prince Diponegoro, an 18th-century Javanese prince and a National Hero.

== See also ==
- List of museums and cultural institutions in Indonesia
