= Mpu Tantular Museum =

- Museum Mpu Tantular
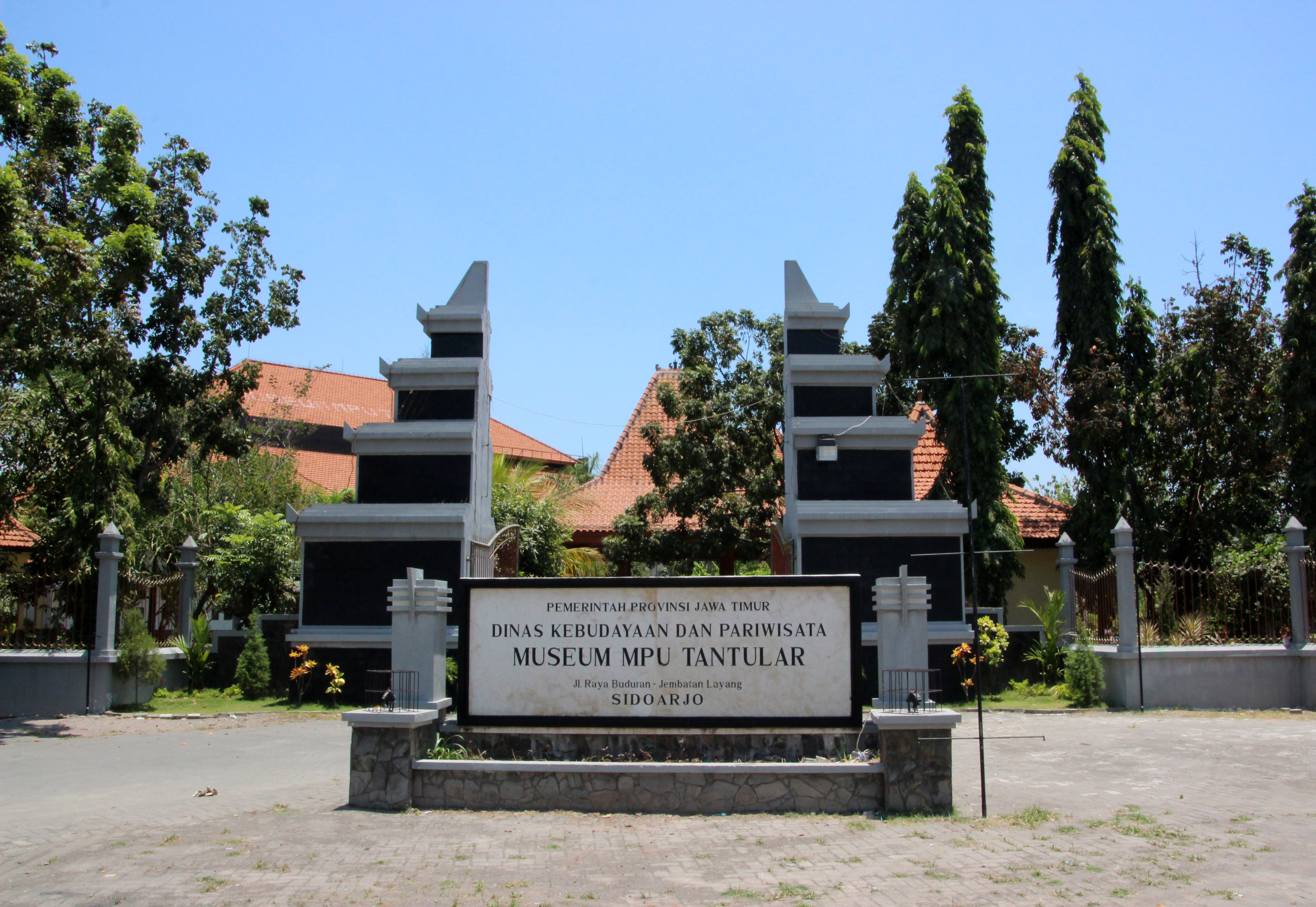
- State Museum of the Province of East Java "Mpu Tantular"
- Established: 25 July 1937
- Location: Jalan Raya Buduran, East Java, Indonesia
- Coordinates: 7.433982°S 112.719922°E
- Type: Ethnographic museum
- Collection size: Objects of East Java
- Owner: Government of East Java

Mpu Tantular Museum is a State Museum (Museum Negeri) located in Buduran, Sidorajo, East Java, a province of Indonesia. Formerly the Stedelijk Historisch Museum Soerabaia, the museum began as a society established by Godfried Hariowald von Faber in 1933. Today, the museum was the State Museum of the Province of East Java "Mpu Tantular".

== History ==
The history of Mpu Tantular Museum began with the establishment of the society known as the Stedelijk Historisch Museum Soerabaia by Godfried Hariowald von Faber in 1933, a German-born Surabayan. Von Faber had a hobby of collecting photos about life in Surabaya which he collected since 1922. Von Faber established his museum first at the Town Hall of Surabaya. His museum, the Stedelijk Historisch Museum Soerabaia was inaugurated by the colonial government on July 25, 1937. Later the museum moved to a building at Jalan Taman Mayangkara 6, Surabaya. The effort to expand the museum was accomplished by acquiring a new building at Jalan Simpang 3 (now Jalan Pemuda 3 Surabaya). After the expansion, the museum had an exhibition room, a library, a museum office, and an auditorium. The museum was also known as Museum von Faber

During the Japanese occupation period, the museum was closed for nine months.

When von Faber died on September 30, 1955, the management of the museum became neglected. Many of the collections were damaged or looted. Later the museum was managed by the Yayasan Pendidikan Umum dan Kebudayaan. In 1964, Prof. Dr. M. Soetopo donated some money to the Yayasan Pendidikan Umum untuk Kebudayaan (Dutch Universeel Cultureel Centrum voor Volksontwikkeling, "General Cultural Center for Folks Art") for the maintenance of the museum.

Following the formation of the Directory of Museum in the National Department of Education and Culture, the national government began to look into the museum more seriously. On May 23, 1972, the museum was opened under the new name Museum Jawa Timur ("East Java Museum"). Following the official opening of the museum, there was an initiative to hand over the museum to the government of the East Java province. On February 13, 1974, a new regulation was issued which determine the status of the East Java Museum as the provincial "State Museum" (Museum Negeri). The inauguration of the museum as a State Museum of East Java was held on November 1, 1974. During the inauguration, the head of the Yayasan Pendidikan Umum untuk Kebudayaan, R. Banu Iskandar, officially handed over the management of the museum to the General Director of Culture Ida Bagus Mantra at Jalan Pemuda 3, Surabaya. As a state museum, the museum receive a name "Mpu Tantular", after the 14th-century Javanese poet from the times of the Majapahit.

In mid 1975, the museum was relocated to a larger building in a new location at Jalan Taman Mayangkara 6, Surabaya. The new location was inaugurated on August 12, 1977, by Governor of East Java Sunandar Priyosudarmo. On May 14, 2004 the museum was relocated again at Jalan Raya Buduran, Sidoarjo.

== See also ==
- List of museums and cultural institutions in Indonesia

== Cited works ==
- Museum Negeri Provinsi Jawa Timur Mpu Tantular (1996). Buku petunjuk singkat mengunjungi Museum Negeri Provinsi Jawa Timur Mpu Tantular. Surabaya: Pemerintahan Propinsi Jawa Timur.
- R. Tjahjopurnomo; Agus Aris Munandar; et al. (2011). Sejarah Permuseuman di Indonesia [The History of Museum in Indonesia]. Direktorat Jenderal Kebudayaan. ISBN 9786021962718.
