= West Nusa Tenggara State Museum =

Museum in Indonesia

- Museum Negeri Nusa Tenggara Barat
- Established: 1981
- Location: Jl. Panji Tilar Negara 6, Mataram 83114, Indonesia
- Coordinates: 8.584872°S 116.086092°E
- Type: Heritage centre
- Collection size: 7,387 items of Lombok and Sumbawa related items (2006)
- Owners: Regional Unit of the Department of Culture and Tourism of West Nusa Tenggara Province

West Nusa Tenggara State Museum (Indonesian Museum Negeri Nusa Tenggara Barat) is a state museum located in Mataram, Lombok Island, Indonesia. The museum is the provincial museum of the West Nusa Tenggara province.

The museum collects 7,387 items (2006) related to Lombok and Sumbawa traditional arts (e.g. traditional kris, songket, basketware and masks) as well related subject such as geology, archaeology, architecture, biology, ceramic, paintings, and others.

== Collection ==
Some of the museum's collection are wedding costumes of the Sasak, Samawa, and Mbojo ethnic groups, several fossils, colonial coins from the Portuguese, Spanish, and Dutch, and traditional weapon from the Bima Sultanate of Mataram.

The museum also collects traditional items related to mysticism such as divining stones, and traditional items to ward off bad luck, lightning, weakness, and so on.

== See also ==
- List of museums and cultural institutions in Indonesia
