= Bengkulu Museum =

Coordinates: 3°48′56″S 102°17′15″E

The museum

Bengkulu Museum or Bengkulu State Museum is a museum in Bengkulu, Indonesia.

The museum has a collection relating to historical artifacts and traditional cultures of each ethnicity in Bengkulu. There are collections of wedding and traditional costumes, household appliances, traditional weapons, traditional houses, writing letters Ka nga ga and relics of prehistoric civilization from the Stone Age to the Bronze Age. Moreover, there are woven clothes from Enggano society and many pattern of besurek clothes.

== See also ==
- List of museums and cultural institutions in Indonesia
