= Sadurengas Museum =

- Museum Sadurengas
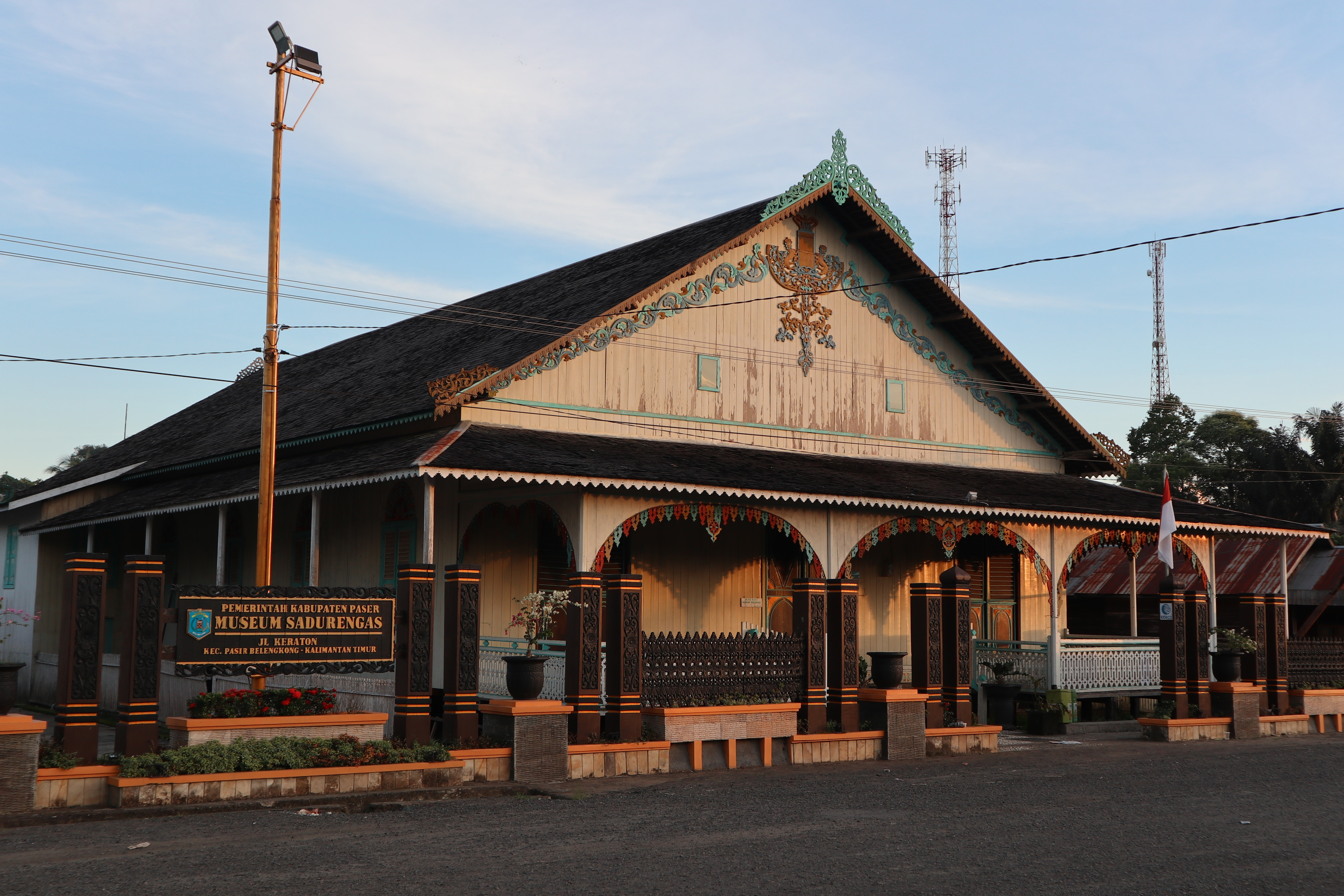
- Location: Jl. Keraton Paser Belengkong, Paser Belengkong, Paser Regency, East Kalimantan, Indonesia
- Coordinates: 1.948079°S 116.210646°E
- Type: historical museum
- Owner: Paser Regency
- Website: http://www.pariwisatakaltim.com/informasi/museum-sadurengas

Sadurengas Museum (Indonesian Museum Sadurengas) is a museum located in Paser Belengkong, Paser Regency, East Kalimantan, Indonesia. The museum showcases artifacts of the Paser Sultanate of East Kalimantan.

== History ==
The museum was established in a former palace of Aji Tenggara, a former Sultan of the Paser Sultanate (1844-1873). The palace is a simple wooden stilt house, a typical architecture in East Kalimantan. In the beginning of 20th-century, the building was reused as residence for Sultan Ibrahim Khaliludin, the next line of Paser Sultans (1900-1906).

The building was made heritage building by the government of Paser Regency in October 2008.

The museum building is located side by side with the wooden Jami Mosque of Nurul Ibadah, also part of the museum complex. The complex also contains the tombs of the kings of Paser Sultanate.

== Collection ==
The museum features artifacts from the Sultanate of Paser. Other collection includes 12th-century crockeries and jars from the Yuan dynasty, as well as household utensils, old Qur'an, traditional musical instruments, some Portuguese cannons and traditional clothing of the Paser Sultanate.

== See also ==
- List of museums and cultural institutions in Indonesia
