= Pekalongan Batik Museum =

Batik museum in Central Java, Indonesia

- Museum Batik Pekalongan
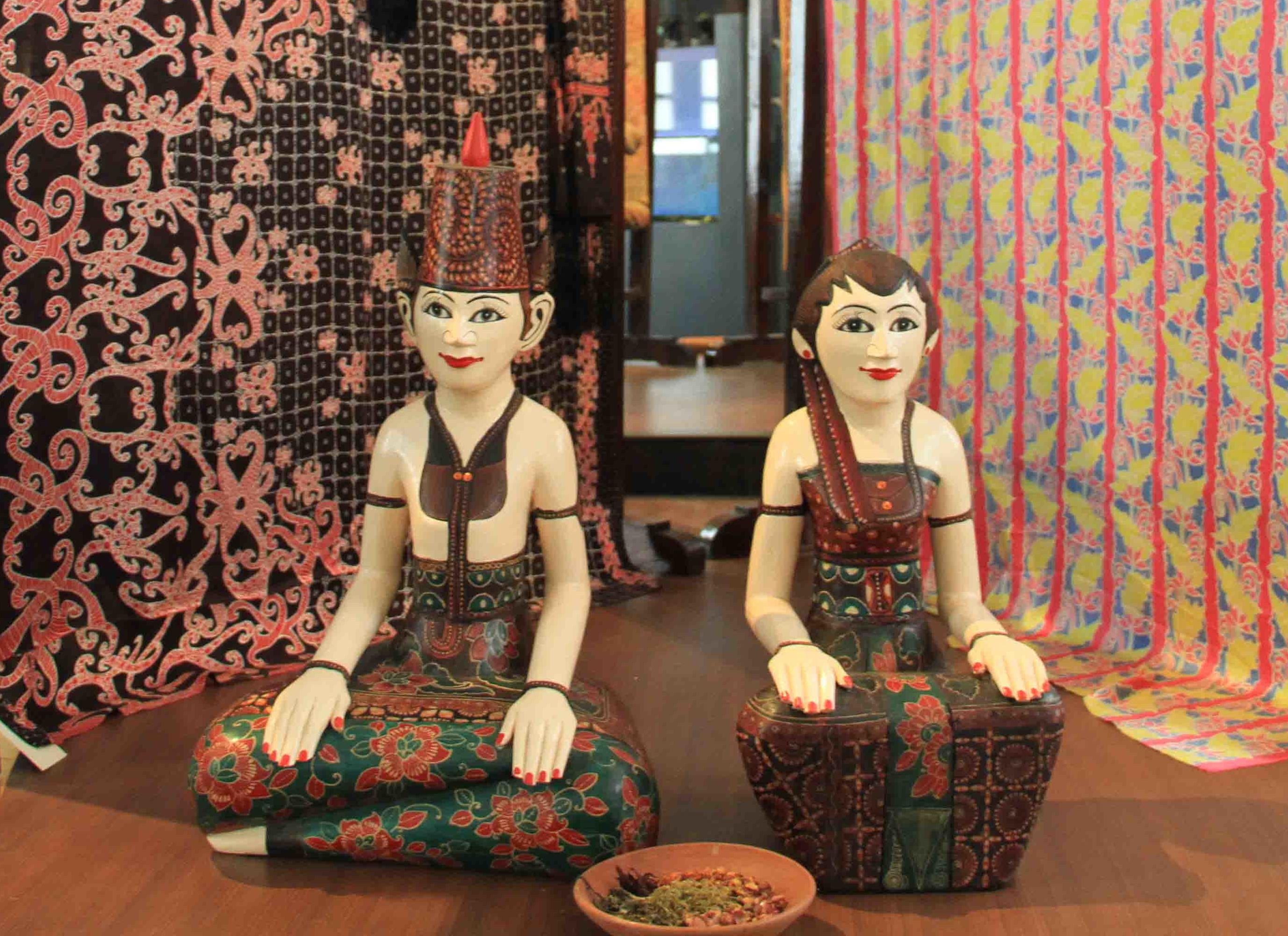
- Exhibit in the Pekalongan Batik Museum, 2015
- Established: July 12, 1972
- Location: Jl. Jetayu No.1, Pekalongan 51152, Indonesia
- Coordinates: 6.875575°S 109.67553°E
- Type: heritage centre
- Website: museumbatikpekalongan.info

Pekalongan Batik Museum is a batik museum located in Pekalongan, Central Java, Indonesia.

== History ==
The building of the museum was formerly the City Hall of Pekalongan (1906), located in the city center along with other important colonial buildings such as the church and the post office.

The museum was officially established by the Ministry of Education and Culture of Central Java on July 12, 1972.

== Collection ==
The Museum has a collection of a wide range of Batik motifs and designs of Pekalongan and the surrounding area, as well as information on the development of batik starting from the Dutch era to the influence of Japan in the period of the Second World War with its Hokokai Javanese motifs.

== Facility ==
The museum contains an office space, a batik shop, a library, and seminar rooms. There is also a workshop to learn about batik-making process.

== See also ==
- List of museums and cultural institutions in Indonesia
