= General Abdul Haris Nasution Museum =

Coordinates: 6°11′34.80″S 106°49′58.36″E

Museum Jenderal Besar DR. A.H. Nasution
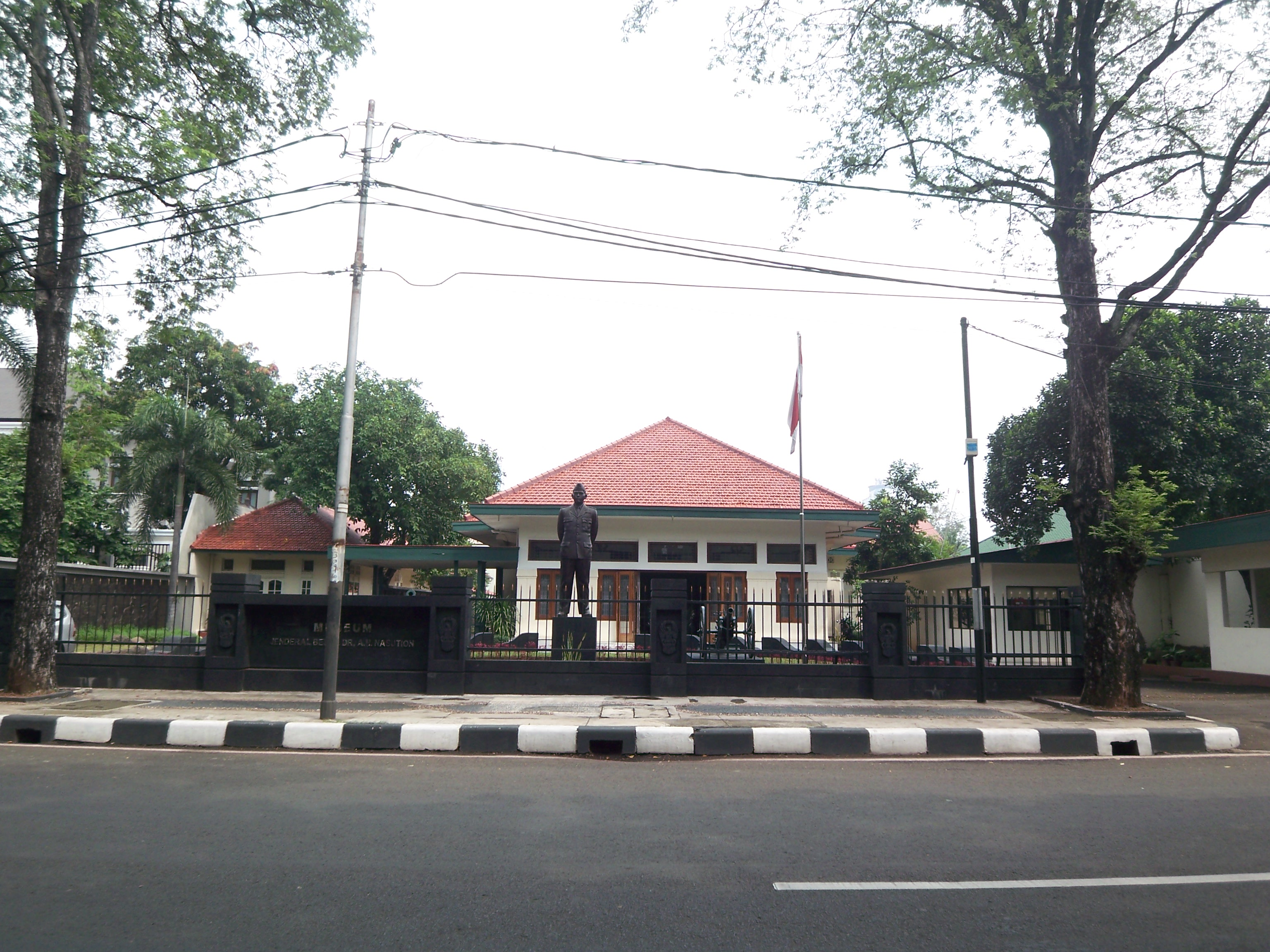
- The front view of Museum.
- Established: 3 December 2008
- Location: Jl. Teuku Umar 40, Gondangdia, Menteng, Jakarta, Indonesia
- Type: Indonesian National Hero Museum

The General Abdul Haris Nasution Museum (Indonesian: Museum Sasmitaloka Jenderal Besar DR. Abdul Haris Nasution) is a museum in Jakarta, Indonesia. It showcases the life, career and works of General of the Army Abdul Haris Nasution, a prominent military figure and the former Indonesian Armed Forces Chief of Staff who barely escaped capture and assassination at the hands of the 30 September Movement in the 1965 coup attempt.

The museum was the residence of Nasution and his family when he became the Indonesian Armed Forces Chief of Staff in 1949 until his death on 6 September 2000. On 30 September 1965, troops from the presidential bodyguard attempted to kidnap Nasution. Nasution escaped, but his daughter, Ade Irma Suryani Nasution, and First Lieutenant Pierre Tendean were killed.

The museum houses items from Nasution's life and some dioramas about the coup attempt. It is open to the public from Tuesday until Sunday, from 08:00 WIB until 14:00 WIB. Admission is free.

== See also ==
- List of museums in Jakarta
