= Jogja National Museum =

Modern art museum in Yogyakarta, Indonesia

- Location in Yogyakarta
- Location: Yogyakarta, Special Region of Yogyakarta, Indonesia
- Coordinates: 7.800156125844667°S 110.353432684005°E
- Owner: Yayasan Yogyakarta Seni Nusantara
- Public transit access: Trans Jogja: 2B, 9, 11 (SMA 1)
- Website: jogjanationalmuseum.com

Jogja National Museum (JNM) is a contemporary art museum in Yogyakarta, Indonesia. JNM has established under Yayasan Yogyakarta Seni Nusantara (YYSN) management, JNM building complex was first a Former First Indonesia Visual Art School (ASRI-1950) and Faculty of Visual Art and Design (FSRD-1984) which later became Indonesian Institute of the Arts, Yogyakarta.

== See also ==
- List of museums and cultural institutions in Indonesia
