= Ranggawarsita Museum =

- Museum Jawa Tengah Rangga Warsita
- Location in Semarang
- Established: July 5, 1989
- Location: Jalan Abdul Rahman Saleh 1, Semarang, Indonesia
- Coordinates: 6.985946°S 110.383871°E
- Type: Ethnographic museum
- Collection size: 59,784
- Owner: Government of Central Java
- Website: www.ranggawarsita.org

Ranggawarsita Museum is a State Museum (Museum Negeri) located in Semarang, Indonesia. As a State Museum, Ranggawarsita Museum is officially known as the State Museum of Central Java Province (Museum Negeri Propinsi Jawa Tengah). The museum displays ethnographic collections of items related with the culture of the Province of Central Java

== History ==
A plot of land was chosen near the Ahmad Yani International Airport to be constructed a state museum for the province of Central Java. Construction of the museum commenced in 1977. The museum starts operating in 1983 following its inauguration by the governor of Central Java at that time, Soepardjo Roestam, on April 2, 1983. Later, the museum was re-inaugurated on 5 July 1989 by the Minister of Education Fuad Hassan and was managed by the Directorate of Culture. After the regional autonomy scheme was enacted, the management of the museum was transferred to the Education and Cultural Department of Central Java on October 14, 1996. In 2011, the museum was refurbished.

The name Ranggawarsita was chosen after Raden Ngabehi Ranggawarsita, a Javanese poet who was born into a famous literary family in Surakarta, Central Java.

== Collection ==
The museum housed a collection of almost 60,000 objects related with the culture of West Java. The collections are displayed in four houses, each corresponds to different theme based on its history.

Building A housed items related with geology, geography, and paleontology. Samples of minerals and natural stones are displayed in Building A. One of the most notable collection is a meteorite found in Mojogedang, Karanganyar in 1984. Sometimes meteorites are mixed into the metal used to create the kris. The paleontology section is displayed on the first floor. The collection from this section are fossilized woods, bones of prehistoric animals, and stuffed animals.

Building B housed relics from Hindu-Buddhist period in Central Java. Collections from this period are statues of lingam-yoni, linga and yoni, jugs, bronze mirrors, and statues of Hindu gods taken from the candis of Central Java. Building B also features objects from the Muslim states period of Indonesia e.g. a miniature of the Great Mosque of Demak and Menara Kudus Mosque, fragment of terracotas or ornaments found from old mosques, e.g. from the Mantingan Mosque, a mustaka roof finial taken from mosques, and a hand-written copy of the Qur'an. Ceramics (both local, Chinese, and European) and batik cloths with emphasize on motifs found in Central Java are kept in the first floor of Building B, as well as objects from the colonial period especially those related with Diponegoro.

The ground floor of Building C displayed items related with the history of Indonesia during the struggle for the independence period. The building features dioramas of several conflict-related events in Central Java e.g. the Battle of Five Days in Semarang, the Palagan Ambarawa, the PKI rebellion in Cepu, the General Offensive of 1 March 1949 and the 1966 demonstration of the Tritura.

Building D contains exhibition related with ethnographic crafts found in Central Java, e.g. objects related with Central Java traditional performances e.g. the wayang, kuda lumping and the barongan of Central Java; and musical instruments from the province.

== See also ==
- List of museums and cultural institutions in Indonesia

== Cited works ==
- Hamid Abdullah; Ngesti Lestari; et al. (1987). Tingkat Kesadaran Sejarah Masyarakat Propinsi Jawa Tengah: Kotamadya Semarang. Direktorat Jenderal Kebudayaan.
