= Reksa Artha Museum =

- Museum Reksa Artha
- Location within Indonesia
- Established: May 8, 1999
- Location: Jl. Lebak Bulus I no. 1, Jakarta 12430
- Coordinates: 6.296482°S 106.794408°E
- Type: History museum
- Collection size: Items related to Indonesian money printing
- Owner: Perum Peruri

Location within Jakarta

The Reksa Artha Museum (Indonesian: Museum Reksa Artha) is a history museum located in Jakarta, Indonesia.

The museum has a collection of historic items related to the printing of Indonesian rupiah. Some of its collection are historic Rupiah banknotes from the independence period until the Orde Baru era, 20th century money printers, coin making tools and historic pictures about the ORI (Oeang Republic of Indonesia) which in the past was used to maintain economic sovereignty in the early independence.

The building of the museum was originally an ink warehouse of Perum Peruri.

Museum Reksa Artha is one of the many museums in Indonesia with low number of visitors. The museum is often closed and so appointments should be made before visiting the museum.

== See also ==
- List of museums and cultural institutions in Indonesia
