= Yogya Kembali Monument =

Monument to the Recapture of Yogyakarta
- Monumen Yogya Kembali (Indonesian); ꦩꦺꦴꦤꦸꦩꦺꦤ꧀ꦪꦺꦴꦒꦾꦏꦼꦩ꧀ꦧꦭꦶ (Javanese)
- Monumen Yogya Kembali, also known as Monjali

- Location within Java
- 7.749577°S 110.369599°E
- Location: Ngaglik, Sleman Regency, Yogyakarta

History
- Built: June 29, 1985

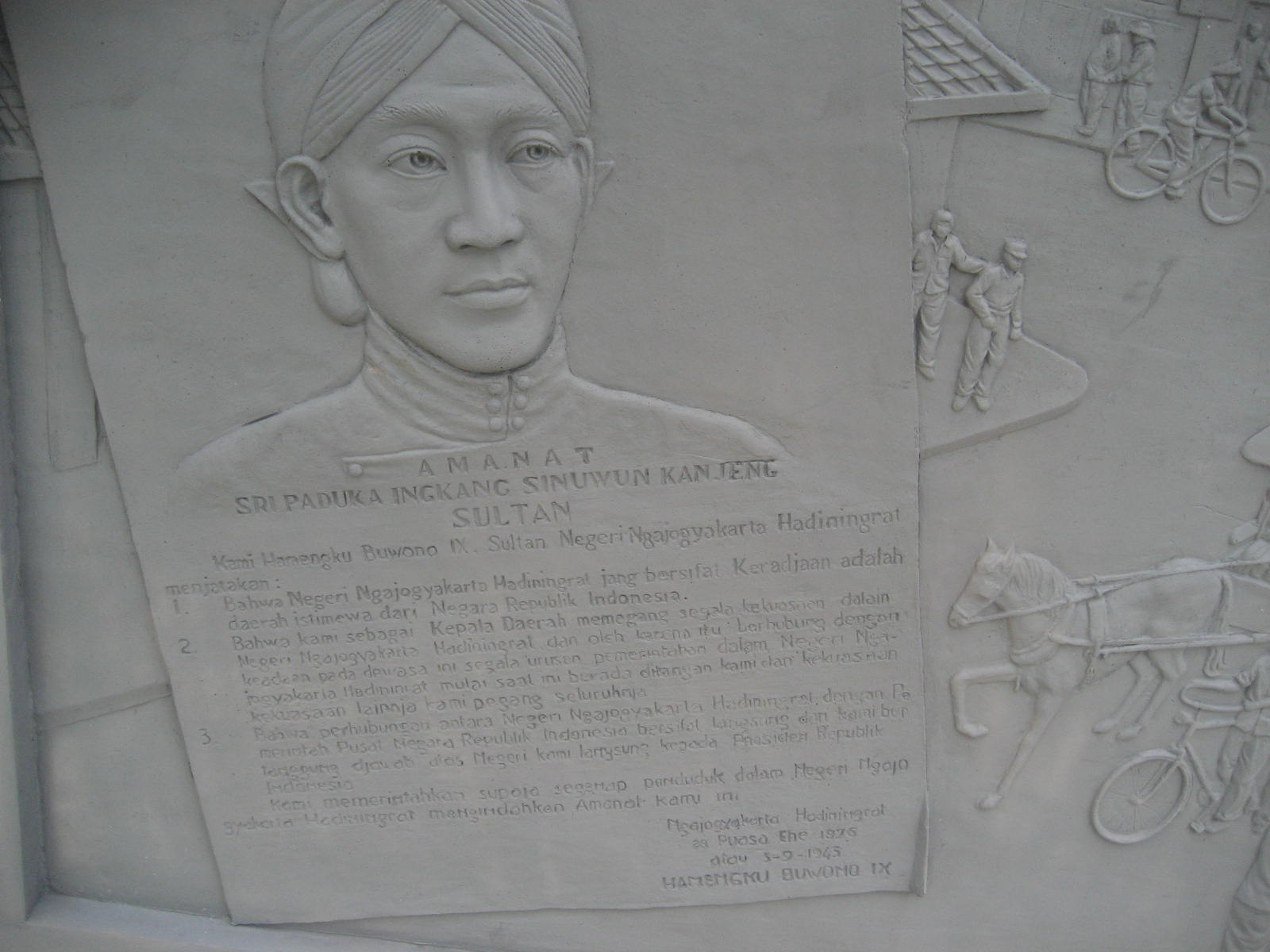
Inscription of King HB IX's mandate regarding Special Region of Yogyakarta, on the front wall of the monument.

Monumen Yogya Kembali (Monument to the Recapture of Yogyakarta; Javanese: ꦩꦺꦴꦤꦸꦩꦺꦤ꧀ꦪꦺꦴꦒꦾꦏꦼꦩ꧀ꦧꦭꦶ), known colloquially as Monjali, is a pyramid-shaped museum dedicated to the Indonesian National Revolution located in the Ngaglik sub-district, Sleman, Special Region of Yogyakarta, Indonesia.

Exhibits include 10 dioramas of key moments in the revolution, artifacts left over from the colonial period and revolution, a list of 420 revolutionaries who were killed between 19 December 1948 and 29 June 1949, as well as a silent memorial room.

Monumen Yogya Kembali is served by Trans Jogja bus stations Monjali 1 and Monjali 2, for line 2A, 2B, 5A, and 5B.

== See also ==
- List of museums and cultural institutions in Indonesia
