= Museum Tani Jawa Indonesia =

Javanese Farmers Museum
- Museum Tani Jawa Indonesia
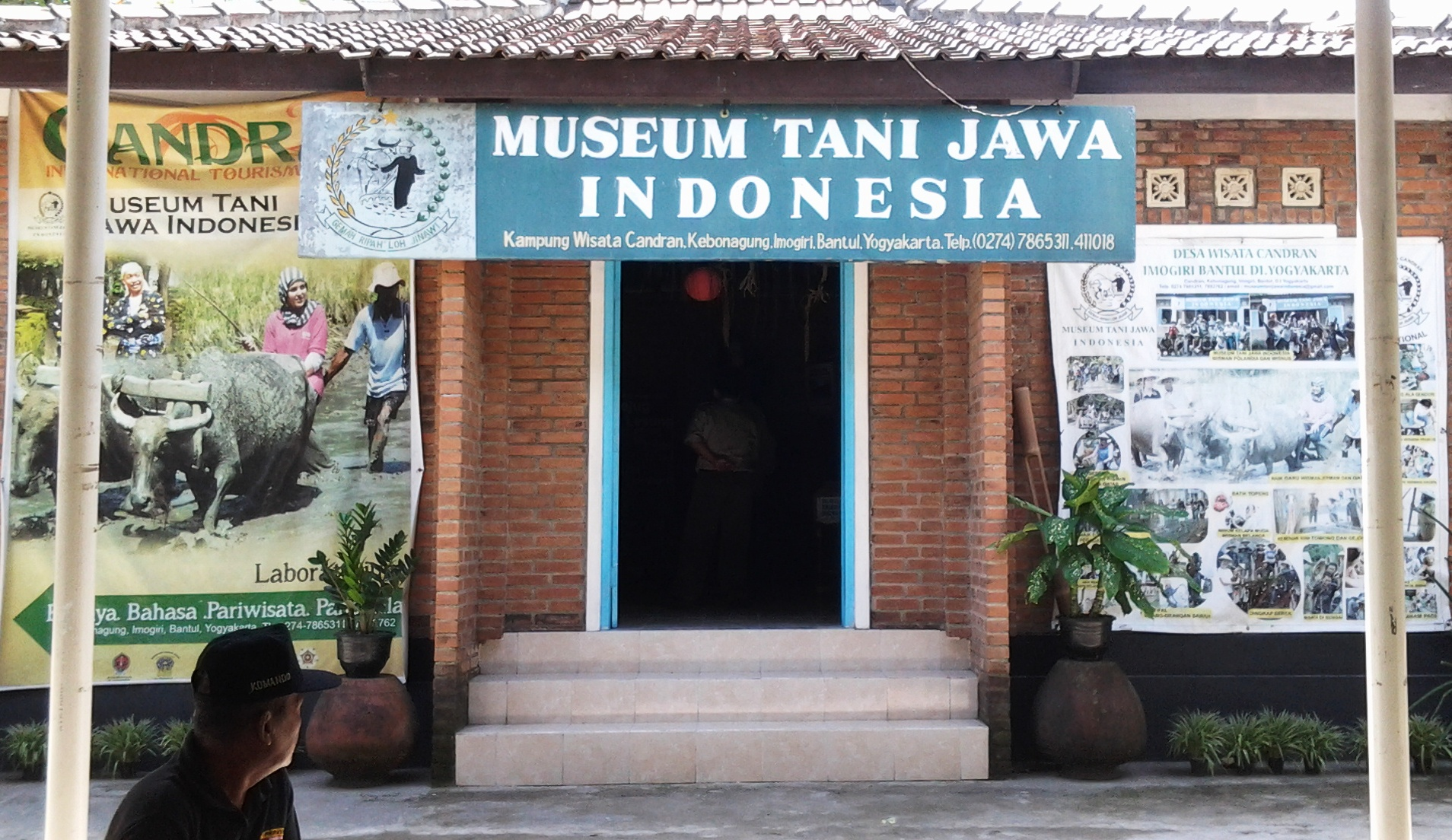
- The Javanese Farmers Museum in the tourist village of Candran, Yogyakarta.
- Established: 27 May 2007
- Location: Candran Village, Kebonagung, Imogiri, Bantul, Yogyakarta, Indonesia
- Coordinates: 7.9244744°S 110.3714677°E
- Type: Ethnographic museum
- Collection size: Farming implements of Central Javanese culture

The Javanese Farmers Museum (Indonesian Museum Tani Jawa Indonesia. Javanese: ꦩꦸꦱꦶꦪꦸꦩ꧀ꦠꦤꦶꦗꦮꦅꦤ꧀ꦢꦺꦴꦤꦺꦱꦶꦲ, romanized: Musiyum Tani Jawa Indonésia) is a small museum located in the tourist village of Candran, in Kebon Agung, Bantul Regency, Yogyakarta. The museum is instrumental in the region.

== Museum ==
The idea to establish a museum dedicated to the Javanese farming was started in 1998. At that time, traditional farming implements were collected to be preserved. The collection was done by the villagers in Candran village led by the chief of the village. On 27 May 2007, the museum was established; exactly one year following the major earthquake in Yogyakarta. The museum was built on a plot of land which belongs to Ki Condro, the founder of Candran Village. Funding for the construction of the museum was collected by the Regent of Bantul from villagers surrounding the area.

The goal of the museum is to enable visitors to learn about Javanese culture of farming and its arts, and to enable visitors to experience Javanese farming by using the items. Javanese Farm Museum has been incorporated into the Supervisory Board of the Museums (BARASMUS, Badan Musyawarah Museum), an organization which oversees museums in Indonesia. The Javanese Farm Museum is supervised by the Indonesian Department of Tourism, Education, and Culture.

== Collection ==
The Javanese Farmers Museum houses collection of traditional implements used by the farmers of Java, usually of rice farming. There are also a collection of objects related to the agriculture of fruit trees, the production of food, and traditional forms of transportation. Today, 260 farming-related implements are housed in the Javanese Farmers Museum. The average age of the artifacts in the museum is 50 years old.

Among the Javanese farming implements kept in the museum were Javanese ploughs, hoes, baskets, lesung, stone lumpang, ani-ani, caping, wajan, kuali, terra cotta anglo, stove, mortar and pestle, ritual objects e.g. wiwitan and merti, and scarecrow objects e.g. memedi sawah and nini thowong.

== Activities ==
The Javanese Farmers Museum routinely hold activities for visitors. Rice planting competition and traditional cooking competition are held in January and March each. In the month of May, a festival featuring traditional performing arts e.g. gamelan performance or percussive performance using long mortar (alu) is held. In July is the National memedi sawah (traditional scarecrows) festival. In the month November, an expo to showcase Javanese farming produces is held.

== See also ==
- List of museums and cultural institutions in Indonesia

== Cited works ==
- Wahyuno, Hardi (2015). "Peran Museum Tani Jawa Indonesia Dalam Peningkatan Kinerja Desa Wisata Candran Bantul" [The Role of Museum Tani Jawa Indonesia in the Development of Candran Bantul Tourist Village]. Jurnal Media Wisata (in Indonesian). 13 (1).
