= Indonesian Hakka Museum =

Museum in East Jakarta, Jakarta, Indonesia

- Museum Hakka Indonesia
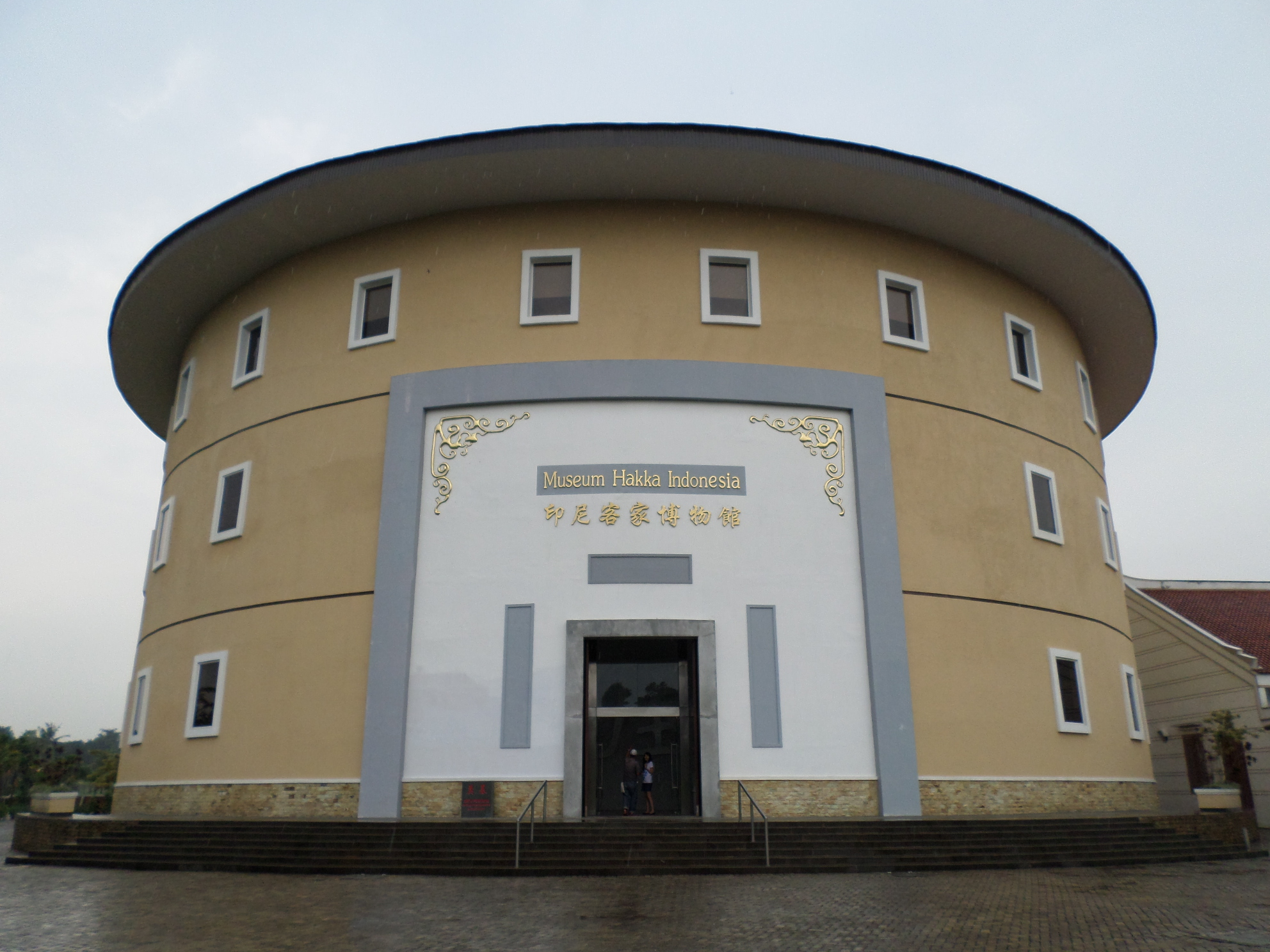
- Established: 30 August 2014
- Location: East Jakarta, Jakarta, Indonesia
- Coordinates: 6°18′19.4″S 106°54′14.4″E
- Type: museum
- Website: Official website

The Indonesian Hakka Museum (Indonesian: Museum Hakka Indonesia) is a museum dedicated to the Hakka people of Indonesia in Taman Mini Indonesia Indah, East Jakarta, Jakarta, Indonesia.

== History ==
The museum was inaugurated on 30 August 2014 by President Susilo Bambang Yudhoyono.

== Architecture ==
The architecture of the museum building follows the traditional Fujian Tulou houses. The museum is divided into:

- Chinese Museum of Indonesia
- Hakka Museum of Indonesia
- Yongding Hakka Museum of Indonesia

== See also ==
- List of museums and cultural institutions in Indonesia
