= Radya Pustaka Museum =

Museum in Surakarta, Central Java, Indonesia

- Museum Radya Pustaka
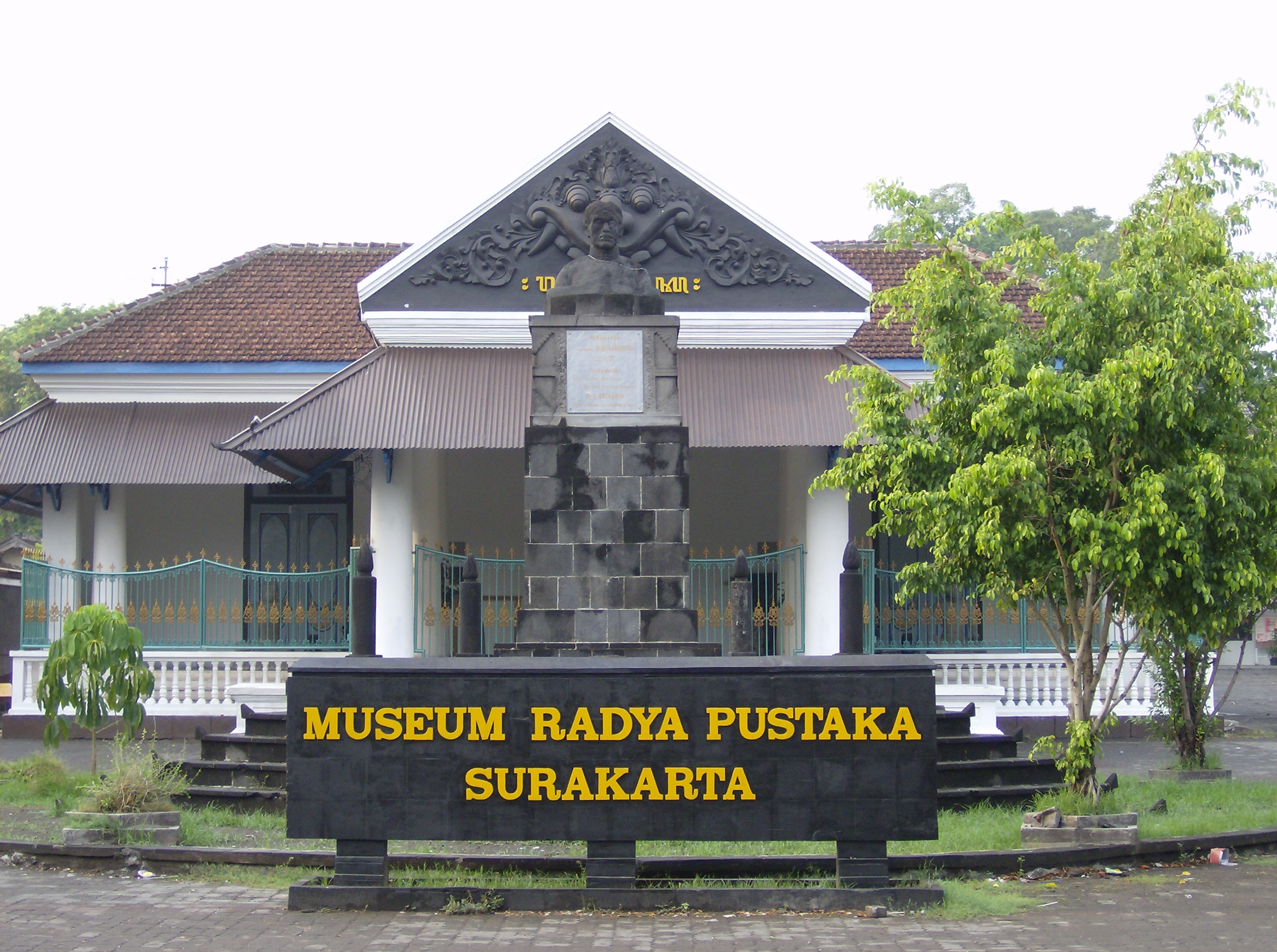
- Radya Pustaka Museum
- Established: October 28, 1890
- Location: Jalan Slamet Riyadi, Surakarta, Indonesia
- Coordinates: 7.568031°S 110.8145°E

Radya Pustaka Museum is a museum in Surakarta, Indonesia. Established in 1890, it is the second oldest museum in Indonesia (the oldest being the National Museum of Indonesia in Jakarta). The museum keeps various literature in Old Javanese and Dutch languages. The museum is located within the park complex of Taman Sriwedari.

== History ==
The museum was established by Kanjeng Adipati Sosriningrat IV during the governorship of Pakubuwono IX on October 28, 1890. On January 1, 1913, the museum was moved to its present location, formerly the residence of a Dutchman Johannes Busselaar.

== Collection ==
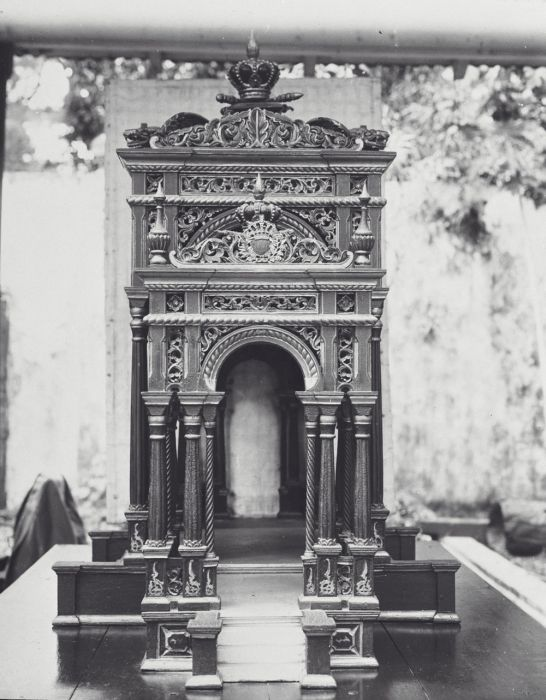
Model of a gate

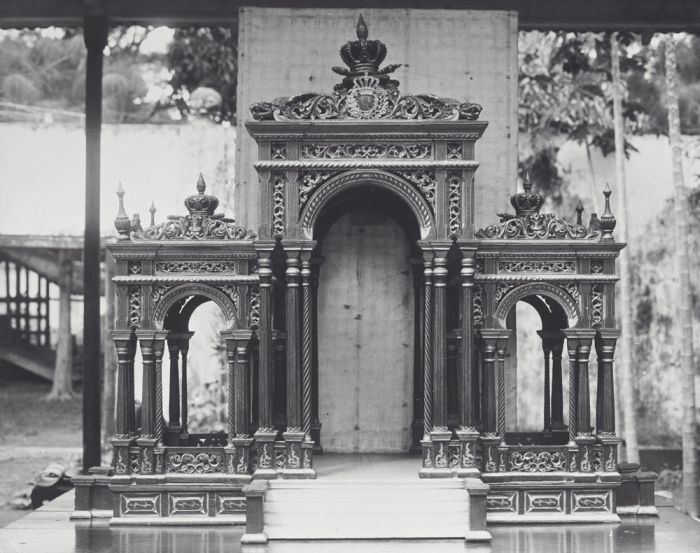
Model of a gate

A bust of Rangga Warsita, a 19th-century poet of the Surakarta Kraton, is placed on the front yard of the museum. The statue was inaugurated in 1953 by - at that time - the Indonesian president Sukarno.

Several 17th and 18th-century Dutch East India Company's cannons are kept in the museum, as well as smaller cannons of the Kraton. There is also Hindu-Buddhist sculptures discovered around Surakarta, wayang puppets, wayang beber, ceramic, gamelan set, and Javanese kris.

== See also ==
- List of museums and cultural institutions in Indonesia
