= Nahdlatul Ulama Museum =

History and culture museum in Surabaya, Indonesia

Coordinates: 7°20′17.6″S 112°43′25.7″E

The Nahdlatul Ulama Museum (Indonesian: Museum Nahdlatul Ulama) is an Indonesian museum that documents the culture and history of the Nahdatul Ulama (NU). Opened on 25 November 2004 by Abdurrahman Wahid, the museum is located in Surabaya, Indonesia. The NU Congress inaugurated the museum with the help of Ra'is Aam as Chairman of NU and KH. M. Sahal Mahfudh. The museum's building is three stories.

The first floor has historical documents regarding NU, NU Coat, Nahdlatut Tujjar, Afkar and Proceedings Act Tashwirul KH. Hashim As'ari. Additionally, there are Kiswa Kaaba, Dokemen Ulama NU khittah and photographs on display.

The second floor contains artifacts and photographs, including sejarah NU, NU Keris, Keris fighters and stick the two central figures NU. These are on display in honor of the ancient Bicycle Conference participants, as well as documentation in the reform era.
