= Tumurun Private Museum =

Museum in Surakarta, Indonesia

- Interactive map
- Established: April 2018
- Location: Surakarta, Central Java, Indonesia
- Coordinates: 7.5705792999999995°S 110.8164917°E
- Type: Private Art Museum
- Website: www.tumurunmuseum.com

Tumurun Private Museum is a private museum in Surakarta, Indonesia's Central Java. The Lukimento family, the founders of Sri Rejeki Tekstil Inc., Asia's largest textile manufacturer, commonly known as Sritex Inc., run the museum, which opened in April 2018.

== Exhibitions ==
The museum has roughly a hundred works of modern and contemporary art, from the Lukminto family's private collection. Basuki Abdullah, Affandi, Hendra Gunawan, Eddie Hara, Rudi Mantofani, Eko Nugroho, Srihadi Soedarsono, and S. Sudjojono are among the artists represented. The museum also has foreign collections from Japan, the Philippines, Singapore, and the United States.

One piece in the collection, "Badman and Superbad" is a 2003 painting by Indonesian artist Heri Dono. The work, measuring 286 x 340 cm, conveys the artist's criticism of the belief that the Iraq war was aimed at controlling the supply of crude oil and other political interests.
