= Kites Museum of Indonesia =

Coordinates: 6.3078°S 106.79059°E

The Kites Museum of Indonesia (Museum Layang-Layang Indonesia) is a museum in Pondok Labu, South Jakarta. It is the first kites museum in Indonesia. Its collection includes more than 600 kites.

== History ==
The museum was built by Endang Ernawati in 2003 because she likes kites. She collected types of kites from across Indonesia and throughout the world.

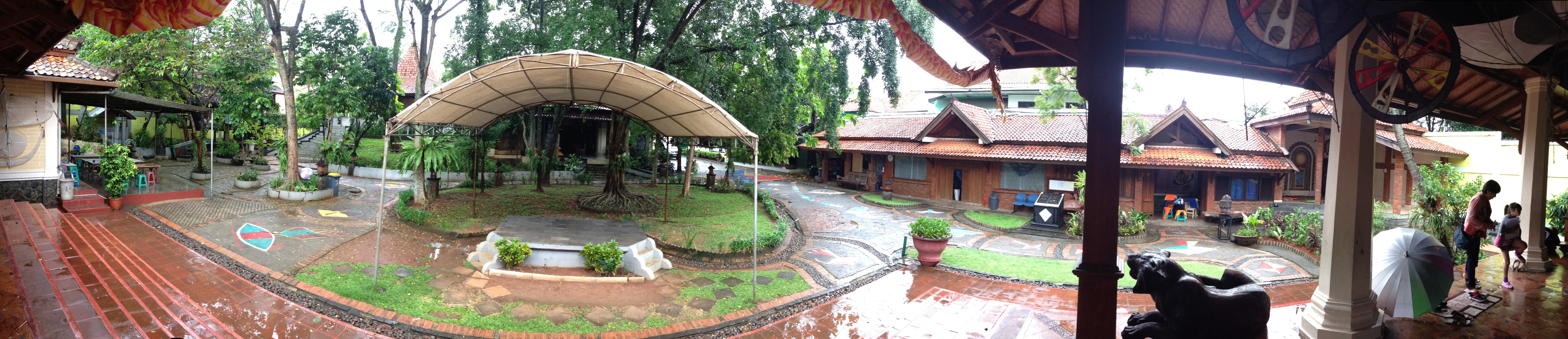
Panorama of the Kites Museum of Indonesia
