= Outline of Jakarta =

Capital and largest city of Indonesia

Coat of arms of Jakarta

The following outline is provided as an overview of and topical guide to Jakarta:

Jakarta – capital and largest city of Indonesia. Located on the northwest coast of the world's most populous island Java, it is the centre of economics, culture and politics of Indonesia.

== General reference ==
- Pronunciation: /dʒəˈkɑːrtə/; Indonesian pronunciation: [dʒaˈkarta]
- Common English name(s): Jakarta
- Official English name(s): Special Capital Region of Jakarta
- Common endonym(s): Jakarta
- Official endonym(s): Daerah Khusus Ibukota Jakarta
- Adjectival(s): Jakartan
- Demonym(s): Jakartan, Indonesian: warga Jakarta, orang Jakarta

== Geography of Jakarta ==
Geography of Jakarta

- Jakarta is:
  - a city
  - a province of Indonesia
  - capital of Indonesia
- Population of Jakarta: 10,075,310
- Area of Jakarta: 661.5 km^{2} (255.4 sq mi)

Jakarta
- Location within Indonesia
- Coordinates: 6°12′S 106°49′E
- Country: Indonesia

=== Location of Jakarta ===
- Jakarta is situated within the following regions:
  - Southern Hemisphere and Eastern Hemisphere
    - Asia
      - Southeast Asia
        - Maritime Southeast Asia
          - Indonesia (outline)
            - Java
              - Jabodetabek
- Time zone(s):
  - Indonesian Western Standard Time (UTC+7)

=== Environment of Jakarta ===
- Climate of Jakarta
  - Flooding in Jakarta
    - 2007 Jakarta flood
    - 2013 Jakarta flood
  - Jakarta Flood Canal

==== Natural geographic features of Jakarta ====
- Bays in Jakarta
  - Jakarta Bay
- Beaches in Jakarta
  - Ancol
- Harbours in Jakarta
  - Port of Tanjung Priok
  - Sunda Kelapa
  - Muara Angke
- Islands in Jakarta
  - Thousand Islands, Indonesia
    - Pramuka Island
    - Onrust Island
- Lakes in Jakarta
  - Setu Babakan
- Rivers in Jakarta
  - Ciliwung River
  - Pesanggrahan River
  - Angke River
  - Sunter River
  - Grogol River

=== Areas of Jakarta ===
==== Administrative cities and regencies of Jakarta ====
- Central Jakarta
- East Jakarta
- North Jakarta
- South Jakarta
- West Jakarta
- Thousand Islands, Indonesia

==== Neighborhoods (localities) in Jakarta ====
- Jakarta Old Town
- Glodok
- Blok M
- Tanah Abang
- Senen
- Pasar Baru
- Kelapa Gading
- Mangga Dua, Jakarta
- Jatinegara
- Kemang, Jakarta

=== Locations in Jakarta ===
- Tourist attractions in Jakarta
  - Museums in Jakarta
  - Shopping areas and markets

==== Cultural and exhibition centres in Jakarta ====
- Jakarta International Convention Center

==== Monuments and memorials in Jakarta ====
- National Monument (Indonesia)
- Selamat Datang Monument

==== Museums and art galleries in Jakarta ====
Museums in Jakarta

- Jakarta History Museum
- Wayang Museum
- Museum of Fine Arts and Ceramics
- Maritime Museum (Indonesia)
- Museum Bank Indonesia
- National Museum of Indonesia
- Taman Prasasti Museum
- Textile Museum (Jakarta)
- Indonesia Museum
- Purna Bhakti Pertiwi Museum
- Satriamandala Museum
- Bentara Budaya Jakarta

==== Parks and gardens in Jakarta ====
Parks in Jakarta

- Bendera Pusaka Park
- Kalijodo Park
- GBK City Park
- Menteng Park
- Taman Suropati
- Muara Angke Wildlife Reserve
- Taman Mini Indonesia Indah
- Taman Impian Jaya Ancol
- Tebet Eco Park
- Situ Lembang Park
- UI Forest
- Ragunan Zoo

==== Public squares in Jakarta ====
- Merdeka Square
- Lapangan Banteng

==== Religious buildings in Jakarta ====
- Istiqlal Mosque, Jakarta
- Jakarta Cathedral
- Immanuel Church, Jakarta
- Gereja Sion

==== Secular buildings in Jakarta ====
- DPR/MPR Building
- Istana Merdeka
- Istana Negara (Jakarta)
- Jakarta City Hall

==== Streets in Jakarta ====
- Jalan M.H. Thamrin
- Jalan Jenderal Sudirman
- Jalan H.R. Rasuna Said
- Jalan Jenderal Gatot Subroto
- Jalan Jaksa

==== Theatres in Jakarta ====
- Taman Ismail Marzuki
- Gedung Kesenian Jakarta

==== Towers in Jakarta ====
- Gama Tower
- Thamrin Nine
- Wisma 46

=== Demographics of Jakarta ===
Demographics of Jakarta

== Government and politics of Jakarta ==
Government and politics of Jakarta

- Administrative divisions of Jakarta
- Governor of Jakarta
- Jakarta City Hall
- Jakarta Regional People's Representative Council
- Sister cities of Jakarta

=== Law and order in Jakarta ===
- Crime in Jakarta
- Jakarta Regional Metropolitan Police

=== Indonesian government in Jakarta ===
- Merdeka Palace
- Istana Negara (Jakarta)
- DPR/MPR Building

== History of Jakarta ==
History of Jakarta

=== History of Jakarta, by period or event ===
Timeline of Jakarta

- Early kingdoms (4th century AD)
- Jakarta under the Kingdom of Sunda (669–1527)
- Jakarta under the Banten Sultanate (1527–1619)
- Dutch Batavia (1610–1942)
- Japanese occupation (1942–1945)
- National revolution era (1945–1949)
- Transition into a capital of an independent nation (1950s)
- Sukarno's nationalistic projects (1960–1965)
- Rise of Ali Sadikin (1966 – late 1970s)
- Economic growth (late 1970s – 1980s)
- 1980s–present

== Culture of Jakarta ==
Wisma 46 in post-modernist architecture, currently fourth tallest building in Jakarta.

Culture of Jakarta

- Betawi people – an Austronesian ethnic group native to the city of Jakarta and its immediate outskirts, as such often described as the native inhabitants of the city. They are the descendants of the people who inhabited Batavia (the colonial name of Jakarta) from during the 17th century.

=== Arts in Jakarta ===
==== Architecture of Jakarta ====
Architecture of Jakarta

- Colonial architecture in Jakarta
- Tallest buildings in Jakarta

==== Cinema of Jakarta ====
Cinema of Jakarta

- Jakarta International Film Festival

==== Literature of Jakarta ====
Literature of Jakarta

==== Music and ballet of Jakarta ====
Music of Jakarta

- Gambang kromong
- Tanjidor
- Kroncong
- Ballet of Jakarta
- Music festivals and competitions in Jakarta
- Music schools in Jakarta
- Music venues in Jakarta
- Musical ensembles in Jakarta
- Musicians from Jakarta
  - Chrisye
- Songs about Jakarta

==== Performing arts of Jakarta ====
- Ondel-ondel
- Lenong

==== Visual arts of Jakarta ====
Events and festivals in Jakarta

- Jakarta International Film Festival (JiFFest)
- Jakarta International Java Jazz Festival
- Djakarta Warehouse Project
- Jakarta Fashion Week
- Jakarta Fair

Languages of Jakarta

- Betawi language

=== Media in Jakarta ===
Media in Jakarta

- Newspapers in Jakarta
  - Kompas
  - Republika
  - Koran Tempo
  - The Jakarta Post
- List of radio stations in Jakarta
- Television in Jakarta
  - TVRI
  - MetroTV
  - tvOne
  - Kompas TV
  - Trans TV
  - Trans 7
  - RCTI
  - MNC
  - SCTV
  - Global TV
  - Indosiar
  - ANTV
  - RTV
  - NET.

=== Religion in Jakarta ===
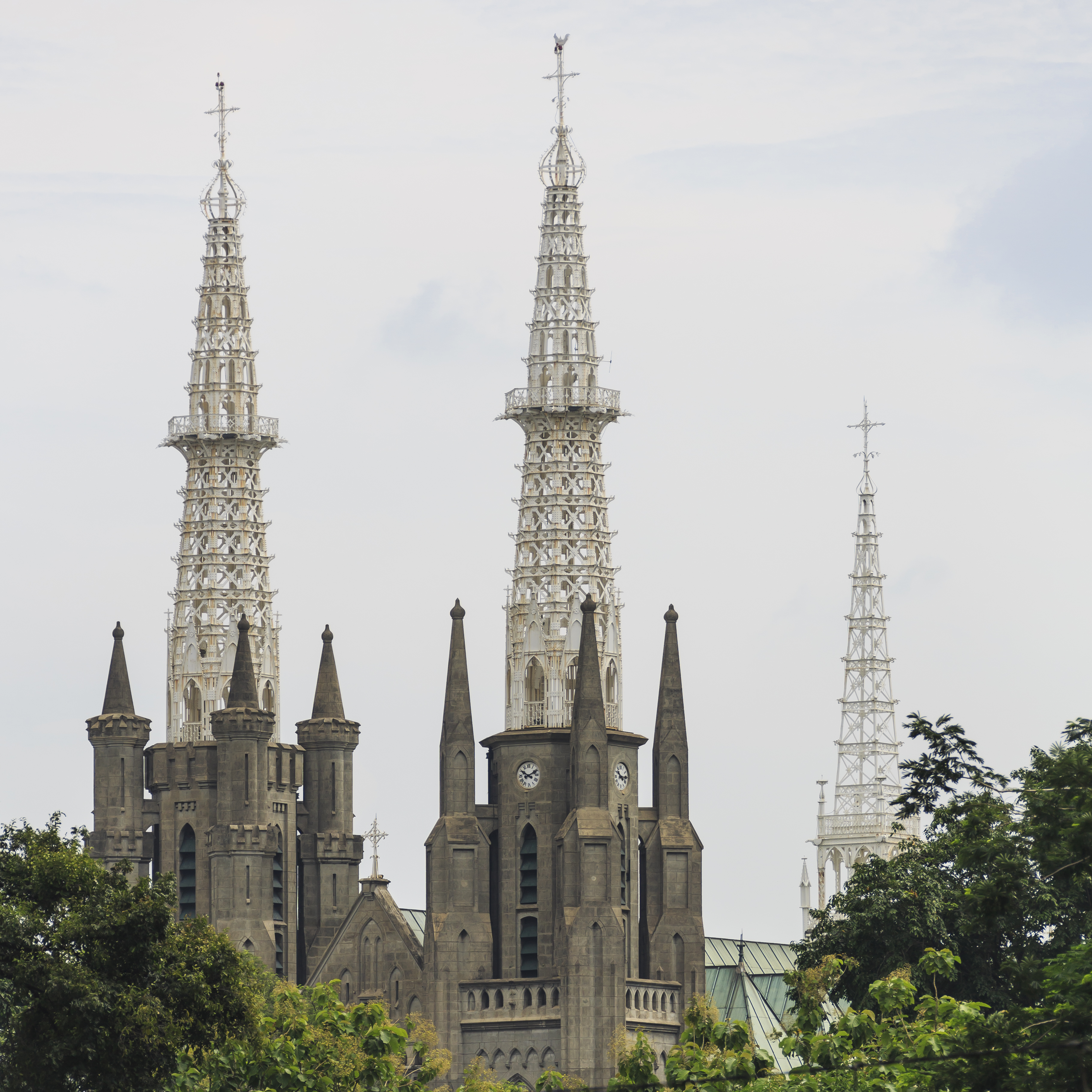
Jakarta Cathedral

Religion in Jakarta

- Catholicism in Jakarta
  - Roman Catholic Archdiocese of Jakarta
    - Catholic Bishops and Archbishops of Jakarta
    - Jakarta Cathedral

=== Sports in Jakarta ===
Jakarta#Sports

- Basketball in Jakarta
  - Satria Muda Pertamina Jakarta
  - Amartha Hangtuah
  - Stadium Jakarta
- Football in Jakarta
  - Association football in Jakarta
    - Persija Jakarta
    - Persitara Jakarta Utara
    - PSJS Jakarta Selatan
- Sports competitions in Jakarta
  - Jakarta Marathon
- Sports venues in Jakarta
  - Gelora Bung Karno Sports Complex
    - Gelora Bung Karno Main Stadium
    - Gelora Bung Karno Madya Stadium
    - Istora Senayan
  - The BritAma Arena
  - Jakarta International Velodrome
  - Jakarta International Equestrian Park
  - Jakarta International Stadium
  - Soemantri Brodjonegoro Stadium
  - Kamal Muara Stadium
  - PTIK Stadium

== Economy and infrastructure of Jakarta ==
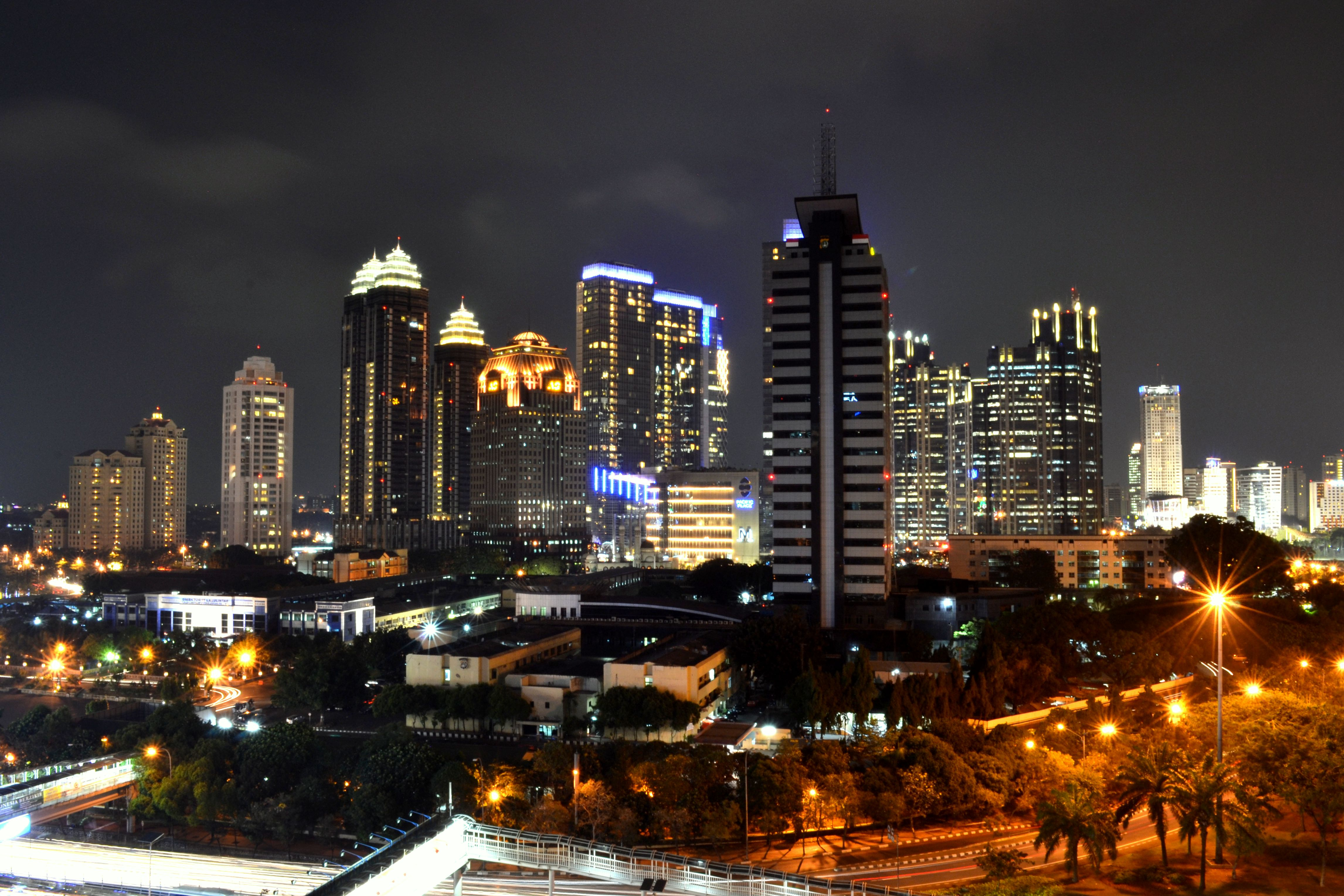
Sudirman Central Business District skyline at night

Economy of Jakarta

- Communications in Jakarta
- Financial services in Jakarta
  - Indonesia Stock Exchange
  - Bank Indonesia
- Golden Triangle of Jakarta
  - Sudirman Central Business District
- Water privatisation in Jakarta
- Hotels in Jakarta
  - Hotel Aryaduta Jakarta
  - Hotel Borobudur
  - Hotel Indonesia
  - Hotel Sriwijaya, Jakarta
  - JW Marriott Jakarta
  - Ritz-Carlton Jakarta
- Restaurants and cafés in Jakarta
  - Cafe Batavia
  - Lenggang Jakarta
- Shopping malls and markets in Jakarta
  - List of shopping malls in Jakarta
  - Plaza Indonesia
  - Grand Indonesia Shopping Town
  - Plaza Senayan
  - Senayan City
  - Pacific Place
  - Mall Taman Anggrek
  - Pondok Indah Mall
  - Mal Kelapa Gading
  - Central Park Jakarta
  - Lotte Shopping Avenue
  - Gandaria City
  - Kota Kasablanka
  - Kemang Village
  - Lippo Mall Puri
  - Bay Walk Mall
  - Senayan City
  - Kuningan City
  - Tanah Abang Market
- Tourism in Jakarta

=== Transport in Jakarta ===
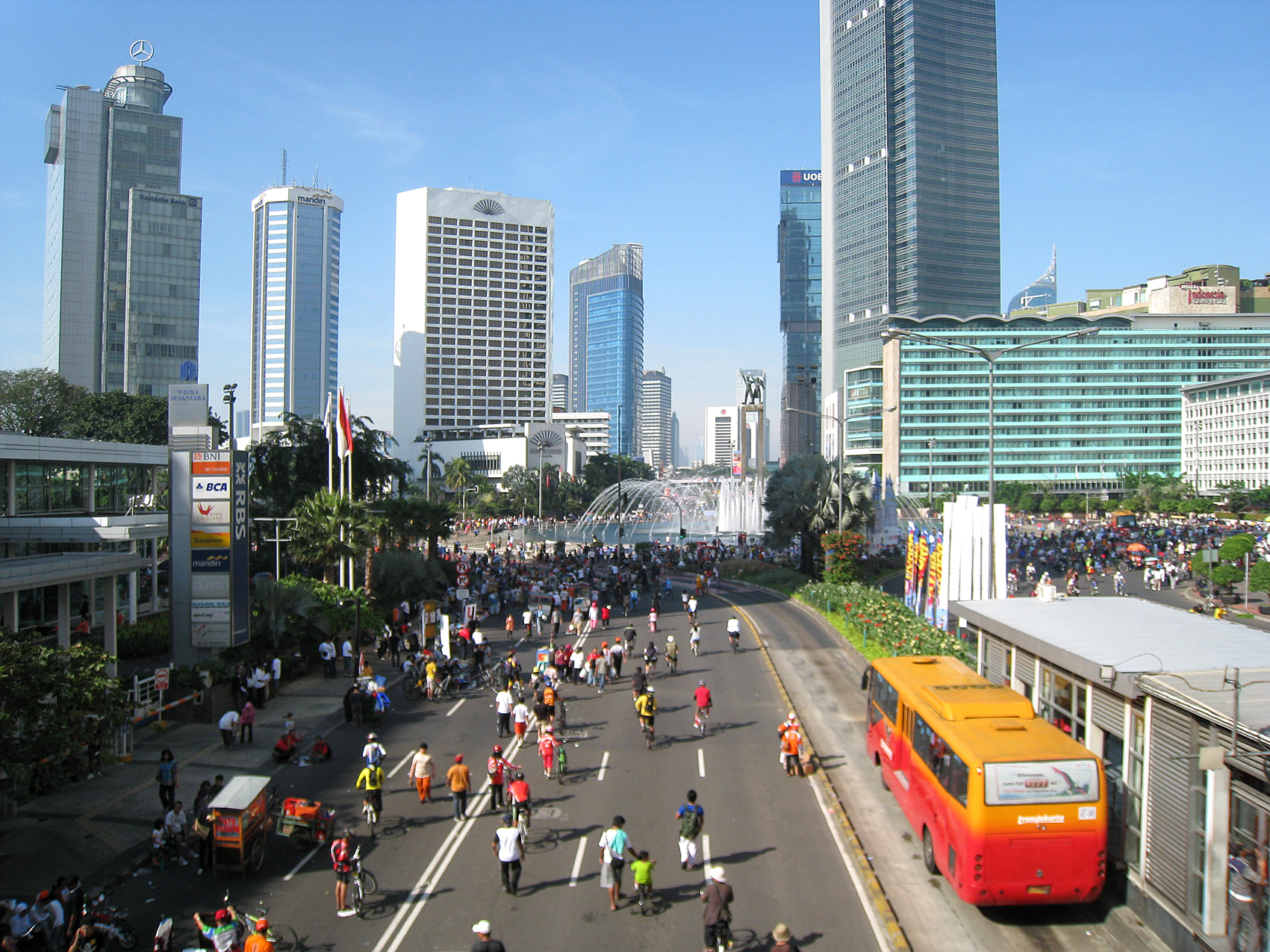
A TransJakarta bus at a station on Jalan M.H. Thamrin during Car-Free Day

Transport in Jakarta

- Air transport in Jakarta
  - Airports in Jakarta
    - Soekarno–Hatta International Airport
    - Halim Perdanakusuma International Airport
- Maritime transport in Jakarta
  - Port of Tanjung Priok
  - Sunda Kelapa
- Road transport in Jakarta
  - Buses in Jakarta
    - TransJakarta
    - Kopaja
    - MetroMini
    - Pengangkutan Penumpang Djakarta
  - Bajaj
  - Cycling in Jakarta

==== Rail transport in Jakarta ====
Rail transport in Jakarta

- KRL Commuterline
- Jakarta MRT
- Jakarta LRT
- Jabodebek LRT
- Railway stations in Jakarta
  - Gambir railway station
  - Pasar Senen railway station
  - Manggarai railway station
  - Jakarta Kota railway station
- Jakarta Monorail
- Trams in Jakarta

== Education in Jakarta ==
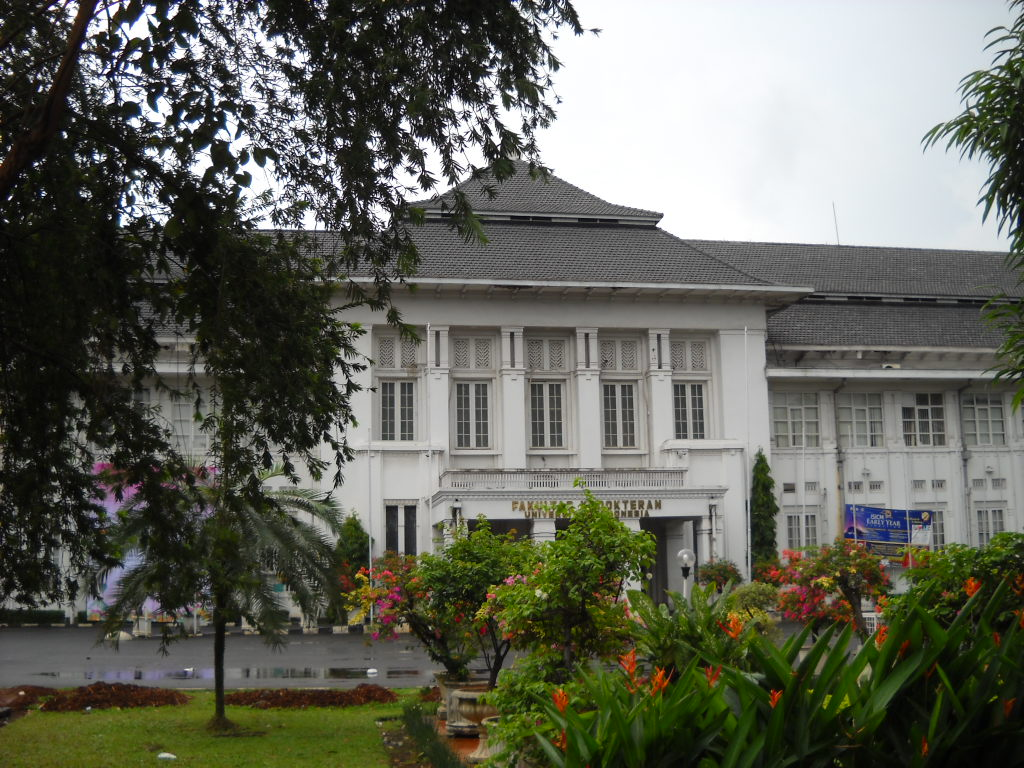
Faculty of Medicine, University of Indonesia

Education in Jakarta

- Universities in Jakarta
  - University of Indonesia
  - Syarif Hidayatullah State Islamic University Jakarta
  - Jakarta State Polytechnic
  - Atma Jaya University
  - Trisakti University
  - Bina Nusantara University
  - Tarumanagara University
  - Universitas Kristen Indonesia
  - YARSI University

== Healthcare in Jakarta ==
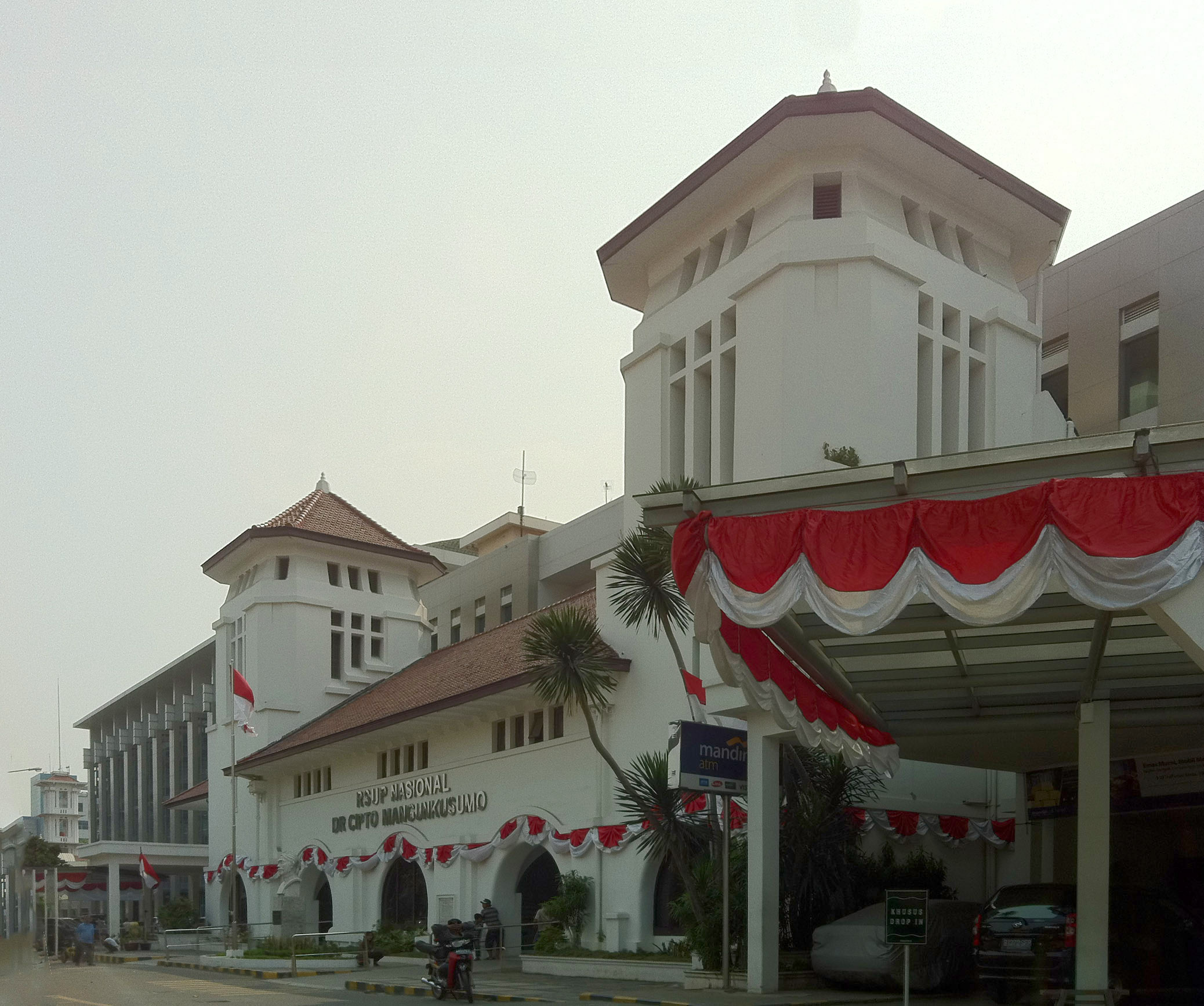
Dr. Cipto Mangunkusumo Hospital

Healthcare in Jakarta

- Hospitals in Jakarta
  - Cikini Hospital
  - Dharmais Hospital
  - Dr. Cipto Mangunkusumo Hospital
  - Gatot Soebroto Army Hospital
  - Hermina Hospital
  - Mayapada Hospital
  - Medika Hospital
  - Medistra Hospital
  - Mitra Keluarga Hospital
  - Siloam Hospital

== See also ==
- Outline of geography
