= Baru Timur River =

River in Jakarta, Indonesia

Coordinates: 6.10°S 106.80°E

Baru Timur River Kali Paseban, Kali Bluntas, Kali Sentiong, Sungai Sentiong, Kali Murtado
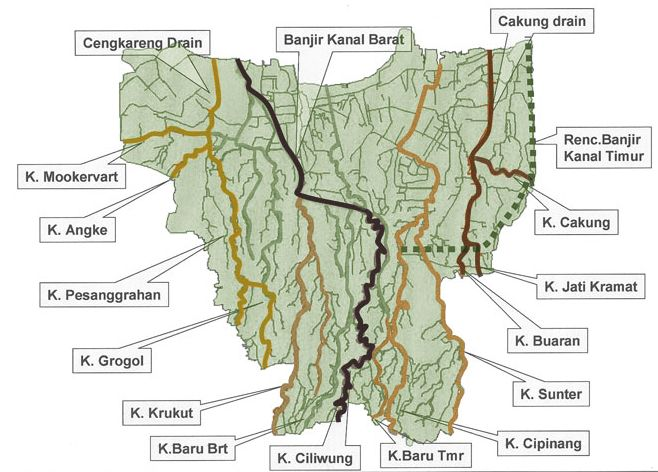
- Kali Baru Timur ("K. Baru Tmr"), bottom in the map of rivers and canals of Jakarta (2012)
- Native name: Kali Baru Timur (Indonesian)

Location
- Country: Indonesia
- State: Jakarta

Physical characteristics
- Source
  - location: Katulampa, Bogor, West Java
- Mouth: Java Sea

Baru Timur River (Indonesian: Kali Baru Timur; Eastern New River) is a man-made canal flowing from Ci Liwung in Bogor Regency to Jakarta, Indonesia. It was one of two canals built in the 18th century under the order of Governor-General Gustaaf Willem van Imhoff originally to transport agricultural harvest from Bogor to Batavia (now, Jakarta). Currently, both canals, now known as Kali Baru Timur (Baru Timur River) and Kali Baru Barat (Baru Barat River), are among the main rivers in Jakarta, and part of the Ciliwung Cisadane flood control project. Baru Timur River flows from the Katulampa flood gate, built at the same time as the canal, along the major road Bogor Highway, passing Cimanggis, Depok, Cilangkap, until reaching the Java Sea in Kali Besar, Tanjung Priok, North Jakarta.

== Etymology ==
The name "Kali Baru" (New River) is connected to the fishing harbor in the Tanjung Priok area. In the 1960s, the harbor was established to replace the Kali Kresek Lahoa fishing harbor which was closed in 1967. The area was divided into two parts: Kalibaru Timur (Eastern Kali Baru) and Kalibaru Barat (Western Kali Baru). Although the fishing harbor was closed in 1988, the harbor became a place to unload wood in Jakarta, but the name continues to be used for the rivers and areas.

== History ==
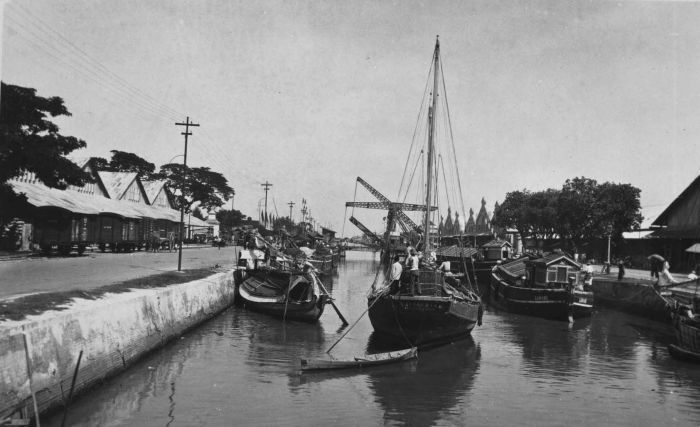
Baru Timur River between 1920 and 1932

In 1739, the Dutch East Indies government under Governor General Van Imhoff built Oosterslokkan ("Eastern Canal") for irrigation and transportation of goods from inland. The canal was completed 14 years later, in 1753, but the effort to use it as a transportation way failed due to many leaks and the high cost of building multiple water gates. Finally, it is used only for irrigation. There were three water gates to water the rice fields in the upstream areas of Ratim, Cibalok, and Cibanon. The water debit increased with the establishment of Katulampa Dam in Buitenzorg (Bogor) in 1749. The canal also supplied water to 9,075-hectare rice fields on the eastern side of Ci Liwung.

In 1753, Oosterslokkan was lengthened to the eastern canal at Weltevreden (Lapangan Banteng), joining the Prapatan canal, to be known as "Kali Baru", and currently as "Kali Baru Timur" (Baru Timur River). As the eastern canal required high maintenance and repair costs, in 1776, Van Imhoff ordered the opening of another canal from the Cisadane River to flow into Ci Liwung. This canal was called Westerslokkan ("Western Canal"), and currently is called "Kali Baru Barat" (Baru Bart River). While the eastern canal was dug from Katulampa until Meester (Jatinegara) and received additional water supply from Cikeas River until Sunter River, the Westerslokkan or the eastern canal flowed from Cisadane River, passing Cipakancilan River, into the area of Kali Baru Barat, Matraman (Minangkabau River), and discharging into Banjir Kanal Barat.

Since the 1960s, Kali Baru Timur contributed to the flood in the eastern part of Jakarta, which comprised the area of Sungai Sentiong Tanah Tinggi, Sumur Batu, Senen, Kali Baru Timur, and Percetakan Negara.

In 1970 clear water flowed in Kali Baru Timur, allowing the white stones at the bottom to be seen, bordered by various trees at both banks. Various sweet water fish and shrimps lived in the river. Children swam and played in the water from Pondok Gede to the water gate of Kampung Gedong. The water was used for irrigation, bathing, washing clothes, and source of drinking water. However, in 1975, the condition changed drastically with the establishment of many factories along the Jalan Raya Bogor (Bogor Highway). As more workers settled in the area, rice fields were transformed into housing complexes. The river water became polluted by the waste discharges from the factories and garbage thrown by the inhabitants, so until today, the water is dark and dirty.

=== Names ===
People live along the river from the border of Jakarta and Depok, until Cijantung, Cililitan, Cawang, and even Cipinang, generally calling the canal "Kali Baru Timur". However, in Matraman or Pramuka, the river is called by various names. In Senen, Central Jakarta, it has been called Kali Paseban, Kali Bluntas, Kali Sentiong, or Kali Murtado. Those names are based on the village or roads passed by the stream. The name "Kali Sentiong" is more popular in the area where Baru Timur River joins the Sentiong River before merging with Sunter River.

== Hydrology ==
Baru Timur River is grouped into the Eastern Area Stream Handling System of Jakarta, along with Cipinang, Sunter, Buaran, Jati Kramat and Cakung River, with a total entry debit at the upstream of 139 m^{3}/sec and the downstream of 237 m^{3}/sec, and the exit debit at the upstream of 39 m^{3}/sec and the downstream of 40 m^{3}/sec, from about 21 tributaries.

In 2016 it was observed that along Pasar Rebo, East Jakarta, the river condition was good with natural banks of stones, an inspection way, and trees along the river. In both banks, there were shopping and dining places. Until Cililitan, the stream narrowed, even flowed under Pusat Grosir Cililitan, one of the Cililitan shopping malls, until it 'reappeared' on the other side of the mall. The stream briefly 'disappeared' again under the stapled interchanges of Cawang, East Jakarta. The width narrowed significantly after the trash filtering grid at the southern side of the Cawang interchanges, then flowing to the north direction passing the areas of Cipinang, Matraman, Salemba, and Johar Baru, until Kemayoran in Central Jakarta. In Kemayoran, the river joins the Sentiong River, then flows further to the north, joining the Ancol River before reaching the Java Sea.

== Geography ==
The river flows in the northwest area of Java with a predominantly tropical rainforest climate (designated as Af in the Köppen-Geiger climate classification). The annual average temperature in the area is 27 °C. The warmest month is March, when the average temperature is around 30 °C, and the coldest is May, at 26 °C. The average annual rainfall is 3674 mm. The wettest month is December, with an average of 456 mm of rainfall, and the driest is September, with 87 mm of rainfall.

== Normalisation ==
Baru Timur River is one of flooding sources in Jakarta, mainly due to the accumulation of garbage thrown into the river. The diving team of Indonesian Army helped to open the obstacles in the underground canal, opening the blocked 70 meter part of the 180-meter long water tunnel which connect the stream from Katulampa Bogor to the flood gate number 11 which divides the flow downstream to the Sentiong dan Ciliwung rivers.

== See also ==
- List of rivers of Java
- List of drainage basins of Indonesia
