= Floods in Jakarta =

Flooding in Indonesia

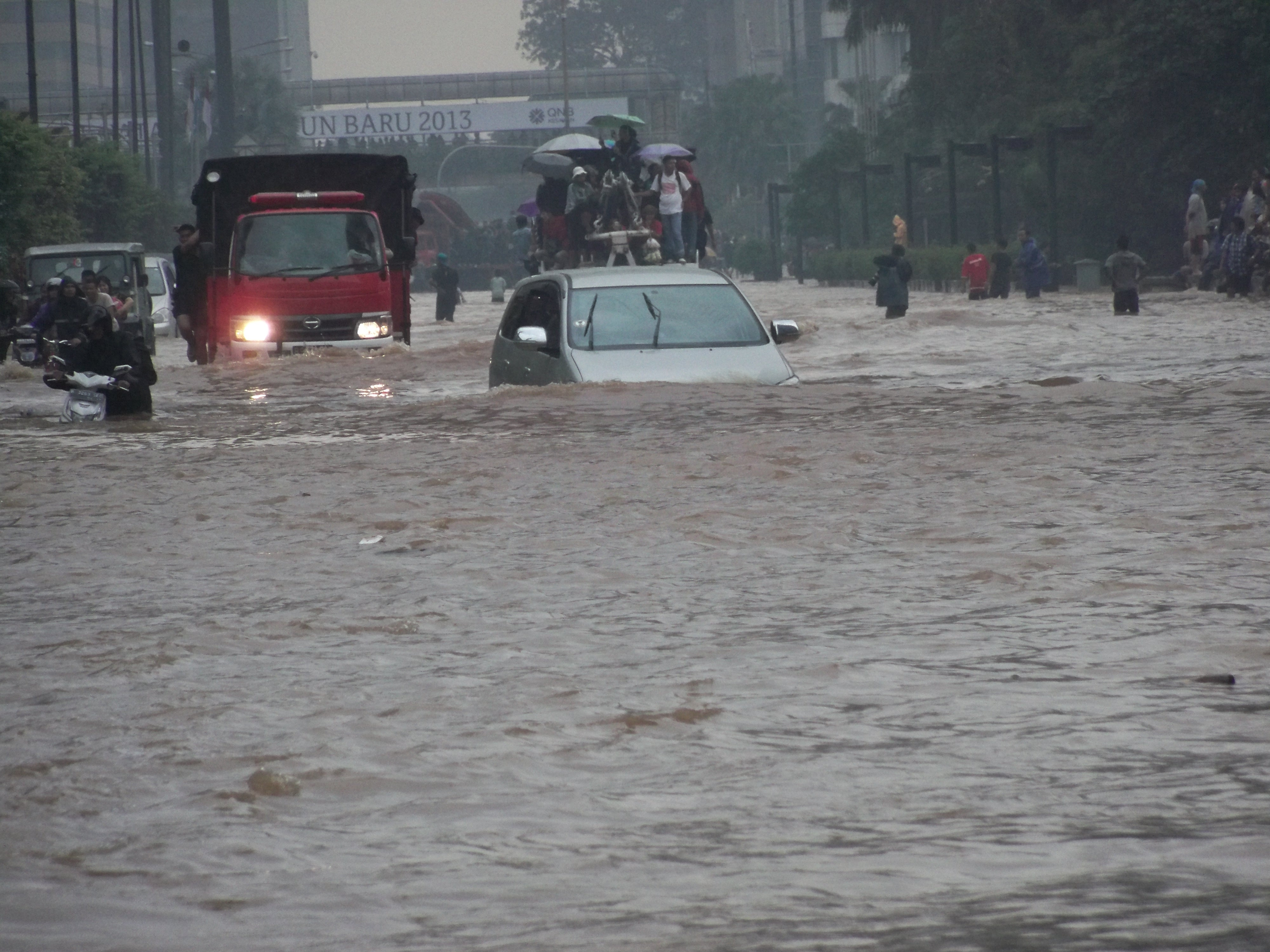
A car tries to drive through flooded street in Central Jakarta, 17 January 2013

Flooding in Jakarta occurs on the northwest coast of Java, at the mouth of the Ciliwung River on Jakarta Bay, which is an inlet of the Java Sea and has happened repeatedly, recently in 1996, 1999, 2007, 2013, 2020, 2025, and more recently in 2026.

The most recent flood was a minor flood that happened in January 2026, but the most recent major flood occurred in early March 2025 and flooded the homes of over 10,000 people in the city and province of Jakarta (the capital of Indonesia). The same flood also affected over 61,000 people in neighboring Bekasi city and over 4,000 people in neighboring Tangerang city. Residents of nearby Bogor reported nearly eight hours of extreme rainfall during the March 2025 flood.

== Jakarta geography ==
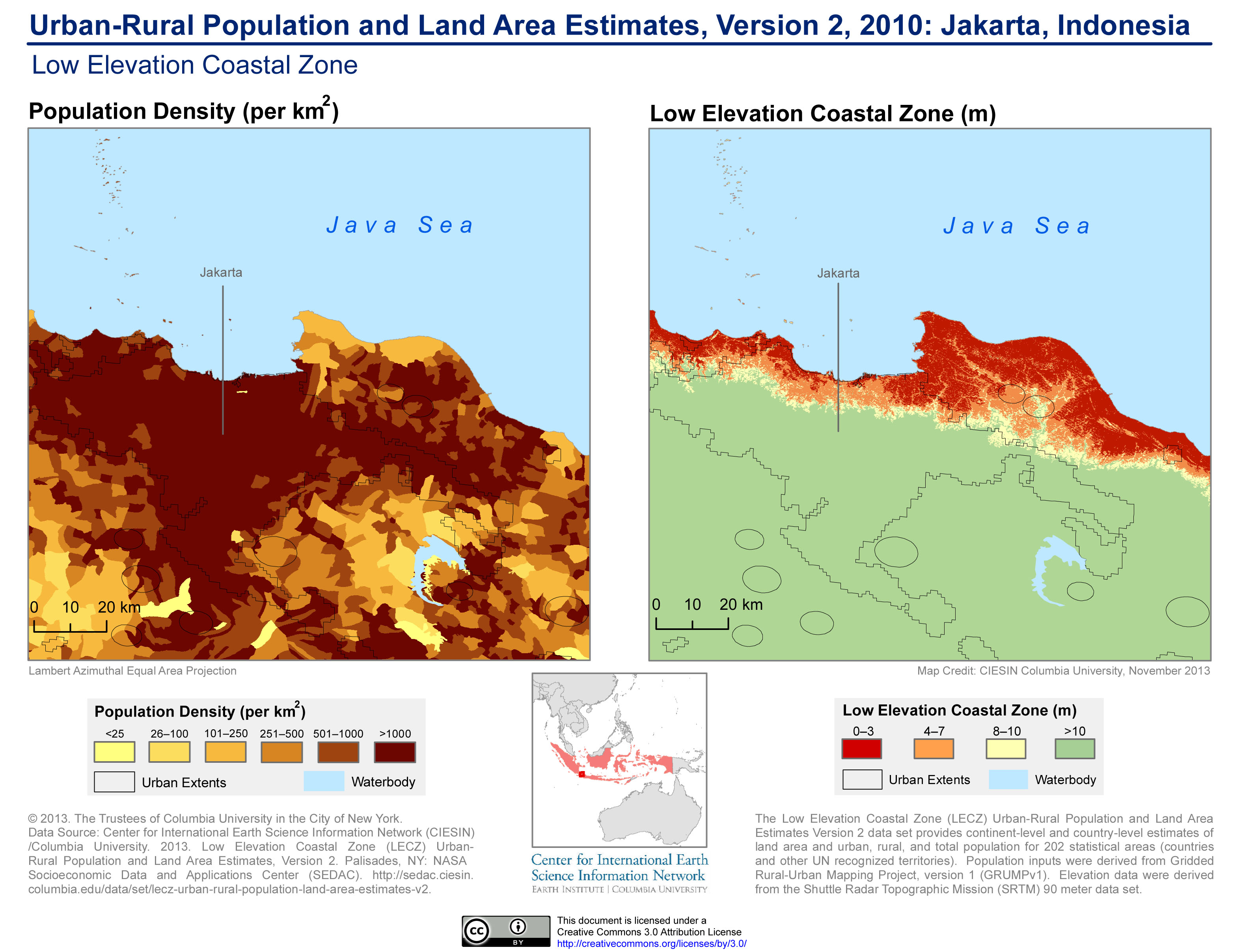
Population density and height above sea level in Jakarta (2010).

The area of the Jakarta Special District is 662 km^{2} of land area and 6,977 km^{2} of sea area.

Jakarta lies in a low, flat basin, averaging 7 metres (23 ft) above sea level; 40% of Jakarta, particularly the northern areas, is below sea level, while the southern parts are comparatively hilly.

Rivers flow from the Puncak highlands to the south of the city, across the city northwards towards the Java Sea; the Ciliwung River divides the city into the western and eastern principalities. Other rivers include the Pesanggrahan, and Sunter.

Other contributing factors include clogged sewage pipes and waterways that service an increasing population, in addition to deforestation near the rapidly urbanizing Bogor and Depok in Jakarta's hinterland.

Jakarta is an urban area with complex socio-economic problems that indirectly contribute to triggering a flood event.

== 1960 floods ==
In February 1960, flooding occurred in the new suburb of Grogol. Despite the flood-proof planning of Grogol suburb, the area was flooded to knee and waist height. This was the first crisis for Governor Soemarno who was installed only days before the floods began.

== 1996 floods ==
Major floods occurred in 1996 when 5,000 hectares of land were flooded.

== 2007 floods ==
Major floods also occurred in 2007. Losses from infrastructure damage and state revenue were at least 5.2 trillion rupiah (572 million US dollars) and at least 190,000 people have fallen ill due flood related illnesses. Approximately 70% of Jakarta's total area was flooded with water up to four meters deep in parts of the city. 80 people were killed in the floods.

== 2013 floods ==
On January 15, 2013, a serious flood affected downtown Jakarta, as well as several other areas surrounding the city, such as West Java and Banten, as a result of heavy rain and waterways clogged with garbage and other kinds of debris. A 30-meter-long section of Jakarta's West Flood Canal dike in Menteng collapsed, which quickly caused flooding in nearby areas. A temporary retaining wall was constructed until workers finished rebuilding a section of a canal dike. Flooding was reported at the presidential palace, forcing the postponement of a meeting between President Susilo Bambang Yudhoyono and his visiting Argentine counterpart, Cristina Fernandez. There were 41 deaths being reported. Evacuations were carried out in parts of Jakarta. An estimated 20,000 people were evacuated as of 17 January 2013

== 2020 floods ==
Floods occurred throughout Jakarta, Bogor, Tangerang, and Bekasi on the early hours of January 1, 2020, due to the overnight rain which dumped nearly 381 mm (15.0 in) — more than 3 times the average amount. The massive downpour caused the Ciliwung and Cisadane river to overflow. Multiple floodgates were assigned emergency status due to the high water levels after the rainfall.

At least 48 deaths had been reported, due to landslides, hypothermia, drowning, and electrocution. Many parts of the city had been left without power, as the power was switched off for safety reasons.

Multiple transportation networks were disrupted including light rail transit, taxis, trains, toll roads, and an airport. Soekarno-Hatta Airport and the Mass Rapid Transit lines were operating as per normal.

Halim Perdanakusuma Airport was closed early in the morning due to the airport runways being submerged. Air traffic was temporarily redirected to Sukarno-Hatta Airport. Halim Perdanakusuma was reopened a couple of hours later.

From 6pm on January 1 until 12pm on January 2, 2020, the government temporarily waived all toll road fees in Jakarta.

At many parts of the city, water levels reached 30 to 200 cm. At some places, such as Cipinang Melayu, East Jakarta, water levels peaked at 4 meters. More than 19,000 residents had been evacuated to higher grounds. The government had designated schools and government buildings as temporary shelters. In several areas, evacuation efforts were hampered by rushing waters and blackouts.

On 25 February 2020, Jakarta witnessed another flood.

== 2021 floods ==
Several areas in Jakarta and the neighbouring cities of Tangerang and Bekasi were inundated in water up to 2m deep on 20 February. At least five people were killed, four of them were children who were swept away by the strong river currents in separate places in South and West Jakarta. Two hundred neighbourhoods have been affected and some 1,380 Jakarta residents were evacuated.

== 2025 floods ==
In March 2025, major flooding occurred in Jakarta, and nearby cities within its metropolitan area which are located in Banten and West Java provinces. The flood was caused due to the overflowing of rivers that are mostly located in Bogor due to high rainfall that affected Jakarta and its metropolitan area.

In March 2025, the Indonesian Navy's Marine Corps conducted rescue operations in Greater Jakarta, including East Jakarta and Bekasi, West Java, where floodwaters reached depths of up to two meters. The marines prioritized evacuating children and the elderly using motorized inflatable boats and established emergency posts to provide medical assistance to affected residents.

At least nine people have been killed, and more than 120,000 people displaced.

== Remedies ==
=== Flood canals ===
East Flood Canal (Banjir Kanal Timur, BKT) in eastern Jakarta was a national project which began in 2003 and late 2009 reached the Java sea and will be accomplished in 2011. It was 23.5 kilometers length which linking five rivers: Cipinang, Sunter, Buaran, Jati Kramat and Cakung. It will reduce flood and hope as a 2 kilometers rowing sport venue too. To ease from flood, Jakarta Emergency Dredging Initiative (JEDI) phase-2 will make underground canal (siphon) from Ciliwung river to Cipinang river and then go through to East Flood Canal. It will lower floods at Cawang, Kampung Melayu, Bukit Duri and Kebun Baru. It is one kilometer long and was finished in 2016.

=== Using participatory mapping for disaster preparedness in Jakarta ===
For managing risk effectively, it needs extensive data for making decisions on investments in preparedness, mitigation, and response. Until recently, detailed information on disaster situation (flooding) was hardly available at local level. A pilot project in Jakarta, led by the Province of Jakarta's Disaster Management Agency collected high-resolution data to inform flood preparedness and contingency. Later, the data, which was accessible by the community and the general public, was used in 2011/2012 Jakarta contingency emergency planning exercise. The risk information it produced was very useful for decision makers in preparedness, development and investment planning. Petabencana.id can now be consulted and it contains a flood map. Some additional info may be found at OpenStreetMap. It is an online, open-source platform, which relies on participatory mapping conducted by local communities, private and public actors who collect the detailed information about a given area and share it, meet the needs in disaster situation.

=== Weather modification ===
To reduce flood risks, national and provincial disaster agencies have used weather modification since 2013. This involves flying planes to conduct cloud seeding by dropping salt-based chemicals over the sea north of Jakarta, with the aim of shifting rainfall away from land and toward the sea. As of March 2025, each flyover cost about 200 million rupiahs (US$12,292).

== Continuing issues ==
=== Jakarta sinking ===
Alongside flooding from rivers, Jakarta is also sinking about 5 to 10 centimeters each year and up to 20 centimeters in northern Jakarta mainland. From 2000 to 2050, the potential coastal flood extent is estimated to increase by 110.5 km^{2} due to both land subsidence and sea level rise. Land subsidence in Jakarta is mainly caused by the overuse of groundwater. At the same time, the groundwater has lost its capacity to recharge due to the lack of watershed areas and overpopulation in the capital. Without any groundwater regulation in place, buildings in Jakarta are drawing water from the ground at an unprecedented rate. For households, especially those at the bottom of the economic pyramid, access to piped water is considered a luxury. Not only must the customer pay for the tariff, which is higher than other Indonesian cities, the installment fees often burden the poor households even further.

In addition, residents consider piped water (and to some extent groundwater) quality in Jakarta to be of poor quality, thus explaining why, as of 2015, only 28 percent of Jakarta households drink piped water and groundwater compared to 95 percent in 2000. Apart from drinking, people in Jakarta still use groundwater, and to some extent piped water and wended water. Such hydrological behaviour has led to the overuse of groundwater, thus contributing to the land subsidence.

In an effort to solve the problem, construction of an 8 km sea wall along the coast was officially launched on October 9, 2014.

== Economical loss ==
The economic losses caused by floods in DKI Jakarta reach Rp 2.1 trillion per year. Mitigation efforts against floods need to be continuously strengthened in order to reduce these losses.

It is estimated that "by 2030, 15 million people and $177 billion in urban property will be impacted annually by coastal flooding, while 132 million people and $535 billion in urban property will be impacted annually due to riverine flooding." (World Resources Institute, 2020)

== See also ==
- 2013 Jakarta flood
- Climate change in Indonesia

== Cited works ==
- Merrillees, Scott (2015). Jakarta: Portraits of a Capital 1950–1980. Jakarta: Equinox Publishing. ISBN 9786028397308.
