= 2025 Jakarta floods =

Natural disaster in Indonesia

2025 Jakarta flood
- Map of Jakarta metropolitan area which impact by flood
- Date: 2–6 March 2025
- Location: Greater Jakarta and parts of Karawang
- Deaths: 9
- Property damage: At least $258 million

In March 2025, major flooding occurred in Jakarta, the capital city of Indonesia and nearby cities within its metropolitan area which are located in Banten and West Java provinces. The flood was caused due to the overflowing of rivers that are mostly located in Bogor due to high rainfall that affected Jakarta and its metropolitan area. However, the massive development within the suburban areas such as Bogor, Bekasi, and Tangerang was also partly to blame for the flood. At least nine people have been killed, and more than 90,000 displaced. It was the worst flood in the city's modern history since 2007 and 2020.

== Background ==
=== Meteorology ===
Floods have hit Jakarta several times in the past, including in 1621, 1654, 1918, 1942, 1976, 1996, 2002, 2007, 2013, 2015, and 2020. The flooding was usually caused by the high rainfall that occur during rainy season that happened between December and March in Indonesia which usually peaked on March every year.

=== Geography ===
The geographic cause of flooding in Jakarta could be caused by some factors including overpopulation that has been a challenge faced by the city for long time and poor urban planning that sometimes accelerated the risk of flooding every year.

== Responses ==
=== Jakarta ===
After the news of the flooding, Jakarta's governor Pramono Anung visited several locations that was affected by the flood, including the East Jakarta Sport Centre that was used as temporary shelter for the people affected by the flood and the Manggarai floodgate. Pramono would later order some floodgates in the city to be opened to minimise the risk of another flood as the water discharge in Manggarai floodgate has reached 850 centimeter.

=== West Java ===
The construction of Hibisc Fantasy amusement park in Puncak as of July 2024, which was demolished for causing floods in the Puncak area

After the flood, West Java governor Dedi Mulyadi went to Puncak to monitor the flooding in the area. Due to the violation that was suspected to be the root cause of the flooding, the West Java regional government ordered 4 tourist areas in Puncak to be shut down, including the Hibisc Fantasy amusement park that was demolished on the same day.
