= Giant Sea Wall Jakarta =

Indonesian coastal development project

Giant Sea Wall Jakarta (Indonesian: Tanggul Laut Raksasa Jakarta) is part of a massive coastal development project in Jakarta, Indonesia which commenced in 2014 and expected to be materialized by 2027. The coastal development project includes the construction of a giant seawall along the coast, building a water reservoir, and the reclamation of land. Construction of an 8 km part of the sea wall along the coast was officially launched on Oct. 9, 2014.

Floods in Jakarta are chronic, especially during the monsoon season. In 2007, the city suffered from catastrophic flooding that resulted in 76 deaths and half a million flood victims displaced or otherwise impacted. Jakarta lies on a low flat basin 23 feet (7 m) above sea level. 40 percent of that, particularly the northern areas, is below sea level. Given the continuous groundwater extraction and the pressure of skyscraper developments, Jakarta is sinking at 5 to 10 centimeters per year, up to 20 centimeters. From 2000 to 2050 the potential coastal flood extent is estimated to increase by 110.5 km^{2} due to both land subsidence and sea level rise; it is estimated that the city will be entirely submerged by 2050. Furthermore, it is estimated that the city's population of over 10.6 million people will be displaced, especially those communities closest to water bodies.

To prevent this, a feasibility study to build a dike on Jakarta Bay was undertaken. The project is known as National Capital Integrated Coastal Development (NCICD) master plan or Giant Sea Wall Jakarta. The project, which also has the task of revitalizing the coastline and most importantly offering a vision of the future for the Indonesian capital, was designed by the architecture firm KuiperCompagnons of Rotterdam and with a collaboration between Indonesia, and a consortium of Dutch companies (Witteveen+Bos and Grontmij), which formed National Capital Integrated Coastal Development and were all involved in the creation of the master plan that started in 2008.

== Background ==
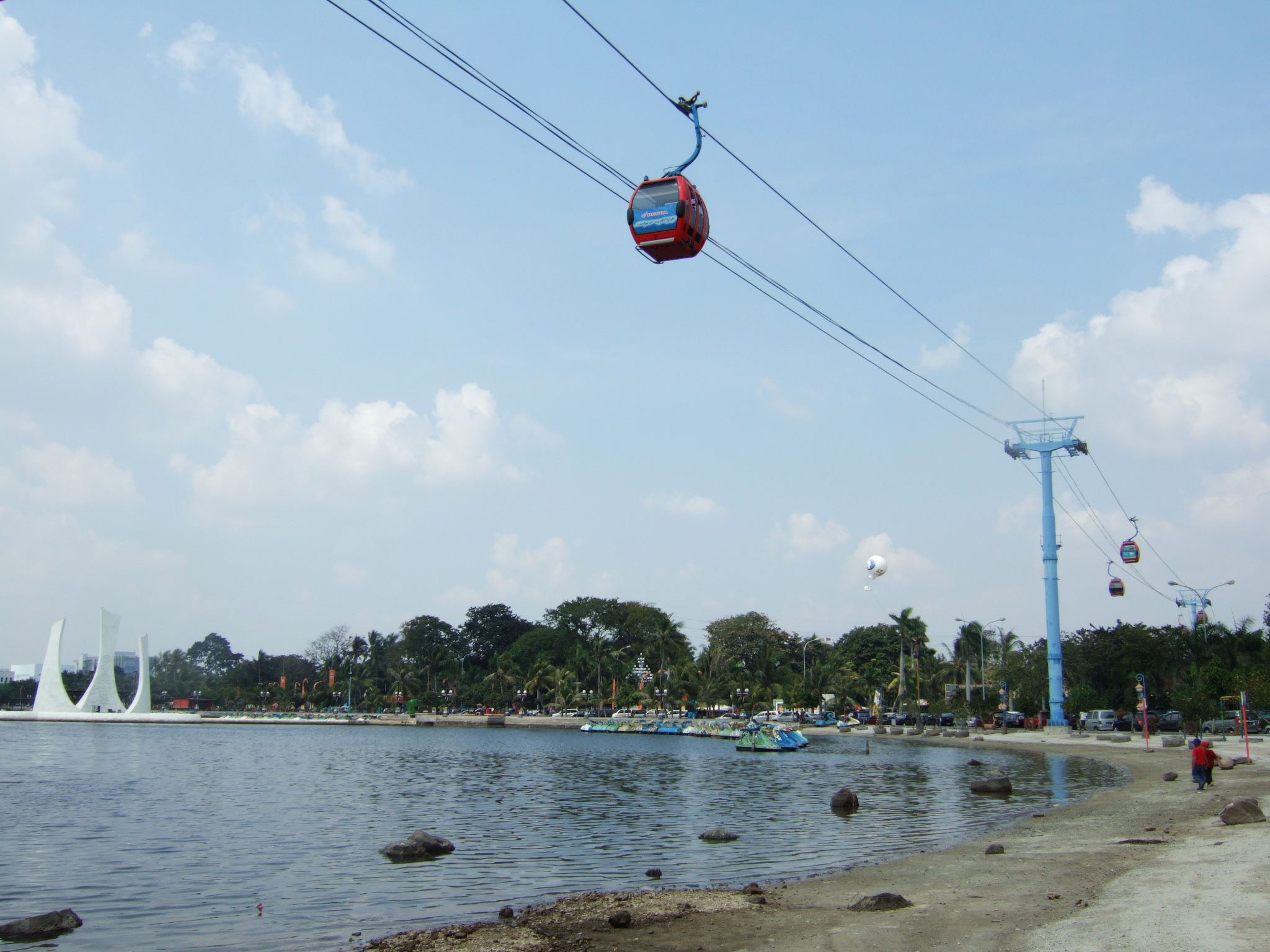
Ancol, a prominent result of Jakarta's land reclamation projects

In 1995, President Suharto issued Presidential Decree No. 52 regarding the Reclamation of North Jakarta Coast. This decree stipulated that the governor of Jakarta is the authorized party for reclamation. The annex to the decree showed that the reclamation was not in the form of separate islands off the northern coastline but rather an expansion of the coastal area. However, due to the economic crisis that hit Indonesia in 1997, the development process was postponed.

In 1999, the DKI Jakarta Legislative Council (DPRD) and the provincial government, under Governor Sutiyoso, issued the Regional Regulation on the 2010 Spatial Plan, in which reclamation was included in the spatial plan and altered from the 1995 plan. The reclamation was aimed at international trade and services, residential areas, and tourism ports. The Regional Spatial Plan (Perda RTRW) indicated that reclamation would cover an area of approximately 2,700 hectares, intended for residential use.

=== Lawsuit by the Ministry of Environment ===
In 2003, the Ministry of Environment, then led by Minister Nabiel Makarim, issued Ministerial Decree No. 14 stating that the reclamation and revitalization project of the North Jakarta coastline was not feasible. The Ministry argued that the reclamation would increase flood risks, particularly in the northern areas, destroy marine ecosystems, and reduce fishermen's income. The project would also require around 330 million cubic meters of sand (for an area of 2,700 hectares), and would interfere with Muara Karang power plant in North Jakarta. In 2003, six contractors sued the decision at the State Administrative Court. The six companies involved were: PT Bakti Era Mulia, PT Taman Harapan Indah, PT Manggala Krida Yudha, Pelindo II, PT Pembangunan Jaya Ancol, and PT Jakarta Propertindo.

Despite the ongoing legal process, in 2007 Governor Sutiyoso issued a principal permit for Island 2A, which later became Island D, for PT Kapuk Naga Indah, a subsidiary of Agung Sedayu Group, on July 19 through Governor's Letter No. 1571/-1.711. The Supreme Court ruled in favor of the Ministry of Environment in the case against the six contractors' appeal, stating the reclamation was not feasible at the cassation level. Previously, the ministry had lost in two lower courts. However, in 2011, during the Judicial Review of the case between the Ministry of Environment and the six contractors, The Supreme Court ruled in favor of the six contractors.

=== Further Plans for Reclamation of North Jakarta Bay ===
Regional Regulation No. 1/2012 on the Spacial Planning of Jakarta

As the project developed, the reclamation originally intended for the North Jakarta Coast under Presidential Decree No. 52/1995 changed when President Susilo Bambang Yudhoyono issued Presidential Regulation No. 54 concerning the spatial planning of Jakarta, Bogor, Depok, Tangerang, Bekasi, Puncak, and Cianjur. Article 70 states that Presidential Decree No. 52/1995 is still valid as long as it does not conflict with regulations under this 2008 Presidential Regulation. However, Article 72 states that Presidential Decree No. 52/1995, as far as it pertains to spatial planning, is no longer valid. These two articles became the source of debate regarding Presidential Decree No. 52/1995, which was the primary legal basis for the reclamation of Jakarta Bay by the DKI Jakarta Government.

The northern coast of Jakarta is planned to undergo land reclamation. The area to be reclaimed will cover 17 islands. Two developers who had already received permits during the administration of Governor Fauzi Bowo are PT Muara Wisesa Samudera, a subsidiary of Agung Podomoro Group, and PT Kapuk Naga Indah, a subsidiary of Agung Sedayu Group.

The development of each island has different purposes, some of which are:

1. Coastal retail areas
2. Outdoor areas with thematic backgrounds
3. Bird parks (education and tourism)
4. Open sports areas with international standards
5. Water sports and beach tourism areas
6. Sports complexes, central hospitals, and international sports development
7. Industrial, trade, and logistics areas
8. Financial and service sector areas
9. Residential areas, hotels, and shopping centers

To this day, the reclamation project in Jakarta continues to generate debate between the Jakarta Provincial Government and the Ministry of Environment. Sudirman Saad, Director-General of Marine Affairs, Coastal Areas, and Small Islands at the Ministry, stated that the reclamation permit is not the authority of the regional head but of the Ministry of Maritime Affairs. The reclamation of the 17 islands has not received approval from the Ministry.

== NCICD main plan ==
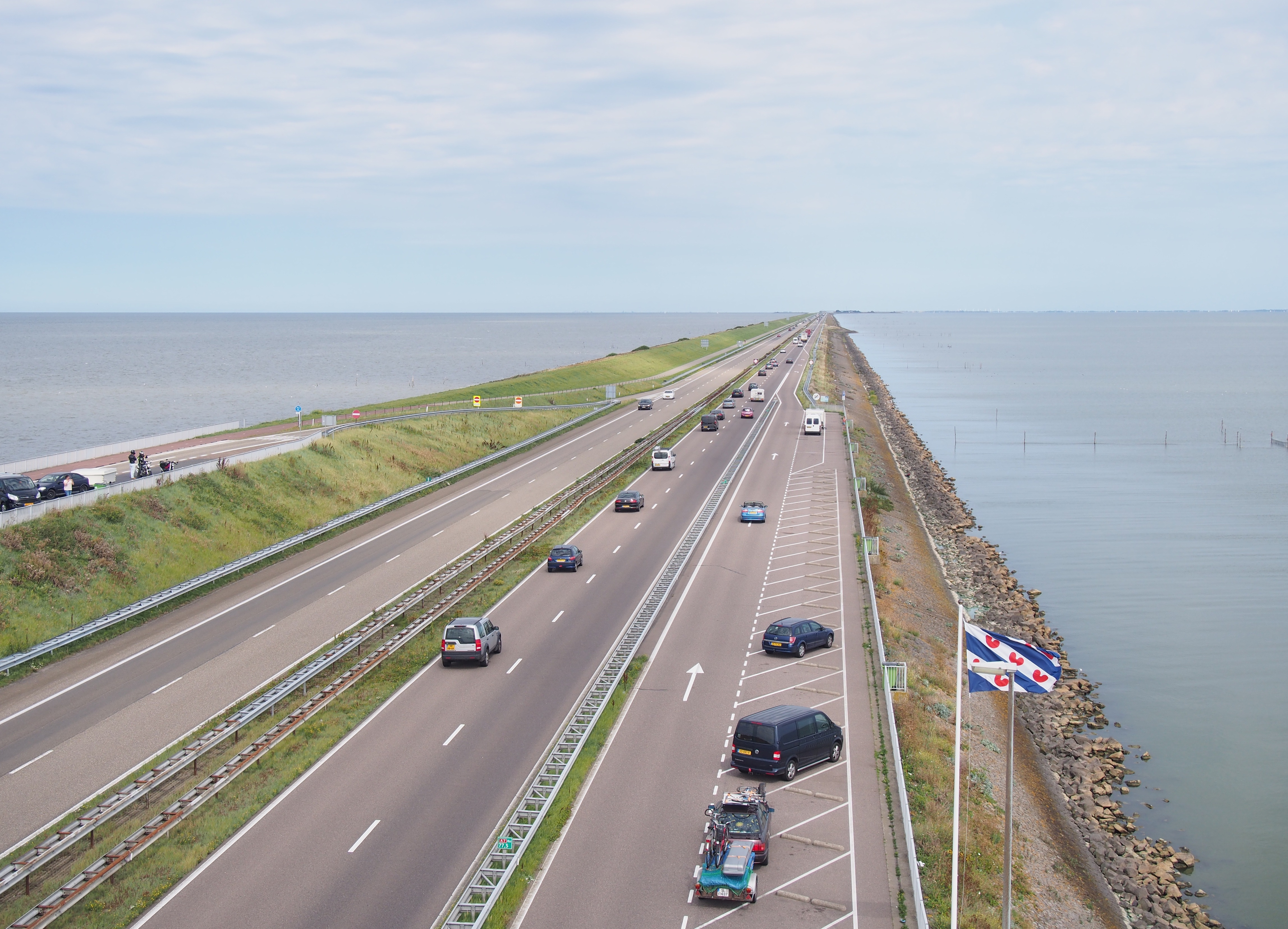
The 32 km Dutch Afsluitdijk, separating the IJsselmeer (right) from the Wadden Sea (left), served as inspiration for the Giant Sea Wall project.

The National Capital Integrated Coastal Development ( NCICD) includes the construction of a giant sea wall just north of the bay in Jakarta as a measure to protect the city against floods from sea. Inside this wall large lagoons will be constructed to buffer outflow from the 13 rivers in Jakarta. This giant sea wall will be built in the form of a Garuda (the large mythical bird which is Indonesia's national symbol) and expected to become an iconic structure modelled after Singapore's Sentosa Island. It will take 10 to 15 years before construction of this wall is realized. Existing dikes will be strengthened in between the times. After completion of the project, Jakarta Bay would become a water reservoir enclosed in the Giant Sea Wall and would eventually become a source for clean water for the entire city. Cost of the project is estimated about US$40 billion, and will be an international collaboration between the governments of Indonesia and the Netherlands, paving the way for further bilateral trade between the two countries. Two phases of this mega-project are:

- Strengthening and enhancing the existing coastal dikes along 30 kilometers, and construction of 17 artificial islands in the bay of Jakarta. The groundbreaking of this first phase was conducted in October 2014.
- Building the Giant Sea Wall; this will be a giant dike (32 kilometers-wide) that includes an airport, harbor, toll road, residential area, industrial area, waste treatment, water reservoir, and green areas, on a space of about 4000 hectares.

The giant sea wall will also become a center of urban development, which will be built by private partnership investments. Urban development includes upmarket offices and housing as well as low-cost housing, green areas and beaches. The new integrated waterfront city will also involve 17 artificial islands, complete with toll roads, a railway, and seaport, and should be able to absorb approximately two million people. The length of the giant sea wall may reach 32 kilometers from Tangerang to Port of Tanjung Priok.

== Controversy ==
The project is not without negative environmental impacts and social consequences: one study by the Ministry of Maritime Affairs and Fisheries of Indonesia found that the project, once underway, could erode the islands in the western part of the bay of Jakarta, destroy the coral reef and lead to the stagnation of polluted water behind the sea wall. The possibility of this last point is rejected by the Dutch experts who, on the contrary, assure that because the city's water will be treated, the rivers will dump clean water into the bay. The reclamation program was also met with opposition from several environmental groups and fisher-folk. Indonesian Forum for Environment (WALHI) and the People's Coalition for Fisheries Justice Indonesia (Kiara) submitted an appeal to halt construction work on Islet G, one of 17 islets to be created but the Supreme Court rejected the appeal. Construction work on the Jakarta reclamation project was temporarily banned by central government in 2016 asking for the fulfillment of several requirements. However the ban was lifted in October 2017. If the great seawalls fail to shut out seawater or the project is suspended or postponed due to economic turmoil, engineering difficulties, environmental impact, or political decisions, and assuming that efforts to reduce land subsidence are not carried out, downtown Jakarta would eventually become submerged.

Critics of the project have also argued that while investors and the government will be footing the cost of the project, it is Jakarta's people that will be paying the price of this infrastructure. While the state has implied that the poor ultimately stand to gain from these projects, the reality is that Jakarta's poor are the most negatively impacted. In 2010, Jakarta's City Government voiced concerns over the effect of climate change over the city's poor and promised to reduce their vulnerability to climate shocks. However, when it came time to expand Jakarta's current sea wall as part of the Sea Wall project, many kampung settlements (i.e. informal slums) were cleared and their residents forcibly evicted. Those communities are some of the Jakarta's poorest and most vulnerable and were unable to relocate to more permanent inland estates. Further, many of these residents relied on their proximity to the sea and their community to earn a living; their lives were unequivocally changed when they were displaced.

On Thursday evening, 31 March 2016, the Corruption Eradication Commission (KPK) conducted a hand-catching operation (OTT) against a member of the DKI Jakarta Regional People's Representative Council (DPRD), Mohamad Sanusi, after receiving a total bribe of IDR 1,140,000,000. This bribe was allegedly related to discussions on the Draft Regional Regulation on Coastal Zoning and the revision of Regional Regulation No. 8 of 1995 concerning the Implementation of Reclamation and Spatial Planning for the North Jakarta Coast. As a result of this arrest, on April 18, 2016, Coordinating Minister for Maritime Affairs Rizal Ramli, the Ministry of Marine Affairs and Fisheries Susi Pudjiastuti, the Ministry of Environment and Forestry Siti Nurbaya Bakar, and the Governor of Jakarta Basuki Tjahaja Purnama decided to temporarily halt or moratorium the reclamation of the North Jakarta Coast. All parties agreed that while reclamation was not inherently wrong, there were regulatory overlaps that needed to be resolved.

== See also ==
- Flooding in Jakarta
- 2007 Jakarta flood
- Jakarta Flood Canal
- Climate change in Indonesia
