= Giant wall =

Giant wall may refer to:

- Mexico–United States border wall, constructed under various American presidents but characterized as a giant wall by Donald Trump
  - Executive Order 13767, enacting construction of said wall
- Giant wall gecko
- Giant Sea Wall Jakarta, Indonesian development project
- Sloan Great Wall, cosmic structure
- Great Wall of China
