= Stefie Jantje Nuhujanan =

- Born: January 3, 1975 (age 51); Ambon, Maluku, Indonesia
- Education: Indonesian Military Academy; General Achmad Yani University
- Spouse: Serly Oktora
- Children: 3
- Military career
- Allegiance: Indonesia
- Branch: Army
- Service years: 1997 – now
- Rank: Brigadier general
- Service number: 11970049380175
- Unit: Field artillery
- Commands: Pontianak Military District; North Jakarta Military District; 7th Field Artillery Battalion

Stefie Jantje Nuhujanan (born 3 January 1975) is an Indonesian army general of the field artillery corps who is currently the chief of the Indonesian national armed forces history center, serving since 7 January 2025. Previously, Stefie was the territorial assistant in the Jakarta regional military command and assistant officer for social communication in the army headquarters.

== Early life and education ==
Nuhujanan was born on 3 January 1975 in Ambon as the youngest of Mecky Agustinus Nuhujanan and Carolina Margaretha Nanlohy. He spent his childhood in Ambon, where he resided at the Poka national housing complex in the southern part of the city. He completed primary school in 1987, before moving up to the 7th Ambon State Middle School which he completed in 1990 and 3rd Ambon State High School in 1993. Stefie was admitted to the Indonesian Military Academy on the same year he graduated high school and completed an advanced paratrooping course in 1996 and advanced field artillery course in 1997 before becoming a second lieutenant of the field artillery corps on 18 December 1997. Nuhujanan has a bachelor's degree in governance sciences from the army owned General Achmad Yani University.

== Military career ==
After officially commencing his service in the army, Nuhujanan underwent a series of specified courses, including on paratrooping in 1997 as well as combat intelligence and English language in 1998. He was then stationed as a junior officer in the 3rd Field Artillery Battalion in Magelang, Central Java, effective 1 October 1998. After a year, he was assigned duties as a supervising officer for the battalion's first battery, and throughout his service underwent another training in combat intelligence in 1999 and staff course for field artillery officers in 2000. He was promoted to the rank of first lieutenant on 1 April 2001, and on 12 September of the same year was entrusted to command the Cakti battery within the battalion. After three years, he received another promotion to the rank of captain on 1 April 2004, and on 20 September was named as the battalion's liaison officer with its superior Diponegoro (Central Java) regional military command. During the later stages of the Maluku sectarian conflict, Nuhujanan was sent to Namlea to maintain order in the town.

Nuhujanan transitioned into territorial roles in 2005, and was assigned as a junior officer without duties for several months in the Cilacap Military District, starting from 3 February of that year. He was named as the military district's chief of operations on 8 August, and throughout the year underwent specialized trainings on territorial matters. Upon the completion of an advanced course for field artillery officers in 2007, on 18 December that year he was stationed at the Cenderawasih (Papua) regional military command, where he was appointed as acting chief of training within the military command's physical department. His appointment was made permanent on 15 March 2008.

From Papua's capital Jayapura, Nuhujanan moved to Praja Vira Tama military area, headquartered in Sorong, as the officer-in-charge for social communications. His appointment was made on 15 March 2009, and he was promoted to the rank of major a few days later on 1 April. He attended the Indonesian Army Command and General Staff College from March to November 2011. Upon completion he was stationed at the Wijayakarta military area, which covers the northern half of the Jakarta metropolitan area, as the acting chief of territorial on 8 November 2011. He assumed the position in an acting capacity until appointed permanently on 28 August 2013.

On 25 September 2013, Nuhujanan was appointed to command the 7th Field Artillery Battalion, based in Bekasi. He was officially installed for the position on 28 November of the same year, and on 1 April 2014 was promoted to lieutenant colonel. His leadership stint lasted less than a year, as on 6 October 2014 he became the commander of the North Jakarta military district command. During his tenure in North Jakarta, Nuhujanan instructed soldiers to take part in construction and facility reparation projects in anticipation of Jakarta's annual floods and in security patrols during the Christmas season. After Jakarta was hit by floods in early 2015, Nuhujanan deployed two tthhousand soldiers under his command to rescue and evacuate residents. In December 2015, the military district received a national record (MURI) award for the largest drug counsellor training, involving over more than a thousand trainees. He handed over his duties on 17 March 2016 following his appointment as assistant officer for technical territorial training in the army headquarters territorial staff on 31 December 2015. His portofolio was shifted to territorial training supervision and capacity building on 21 April 2017.

Nuhujanan moved to Kalimantan following his appointment as the commander of the Pontianak military district on 28 December 2018. He received his duties in a ceremony on 23 January 2019, and was accordingly promoted to colonel on 1 April 2019. Nuhujanan instructed soldiers under him to maintain neutrality in light of the-then upcoming 2019 Indonesian general election and to continuously monitor the development of national and international issues. After a police station was burned in the spillover of the May 2019 riots in Pontianak, Nuhujanan and other top military officials was present to directly control situation in the city. Nuhujanan handed over his command duties on 29 June 2020.

After serving in various provinces of Indonesia, Nuhujanan got the chance to return to his birthplace with his appointment as the spokesperson of the Pattimura (Maluku) Regional Military Command on 6 June 2020. He officially received his duties on 7 July 2020. To maintain friendly relations with local media, Nuhujanan initiated a coffee morning programme with news reporters. In October 2020, Nuhujanan was denounced after claiming that reports of widespread resident anxiety on army data collection and demolition warning were a hoax propagated by the neighborhood coordinator. Later that December Nuhujanan won several distinctions at an army journalistic competition on its civic role. After a few months in the position, Nuhujanan was taken off from his position on 5 March 2021 in order for him to underwent studies at the Armed Forces Command and General Staff College from 1 February to 16 September 2021. On 18 March 2022, Nuhujanan was appointed to the new role of the territorial assistant in the Jakarta regional military command, and was installed on 9 April 2022. After a year, he returned to the army headquarters as assistant officer for social communication on 20 March 2023, and handed over his duties in the Jakarta regional military command on 4 May 2023. Following the launching of Operation Habema in April 2024, Nuhujanan assumed ad hoc duties as the commander of the operation's territorial taskforce, responsible for directing the provision of health and welfare services to people under the jurisdiction of the operation.

Nuhujanan in his brigadier general field uniform.

Nuhujanan was appointed as the chief of the Indonesian national armed forces history center on 6 December 2024. He was installed for the position by the armed forces commander on 7 January 2025 after being promoted to the rank of brigadier general the day prior. Shortly after filling the position, Nuhujanan visited the Indonesian national archives to optimize the center's archive management and directed the collection of historical operations data in Ambon as well as the role of local units. Nuhujanan continued to retain his ad hoc position in Operation Habema.

== Personal life ==
Nuhujanan, who is an adherent of the Protestant faith, is married to Serly Oktora from Purbalingga, The couple has three sons.
