= 2020 Jakarta floods =

2020 flash flooding in Jakarta

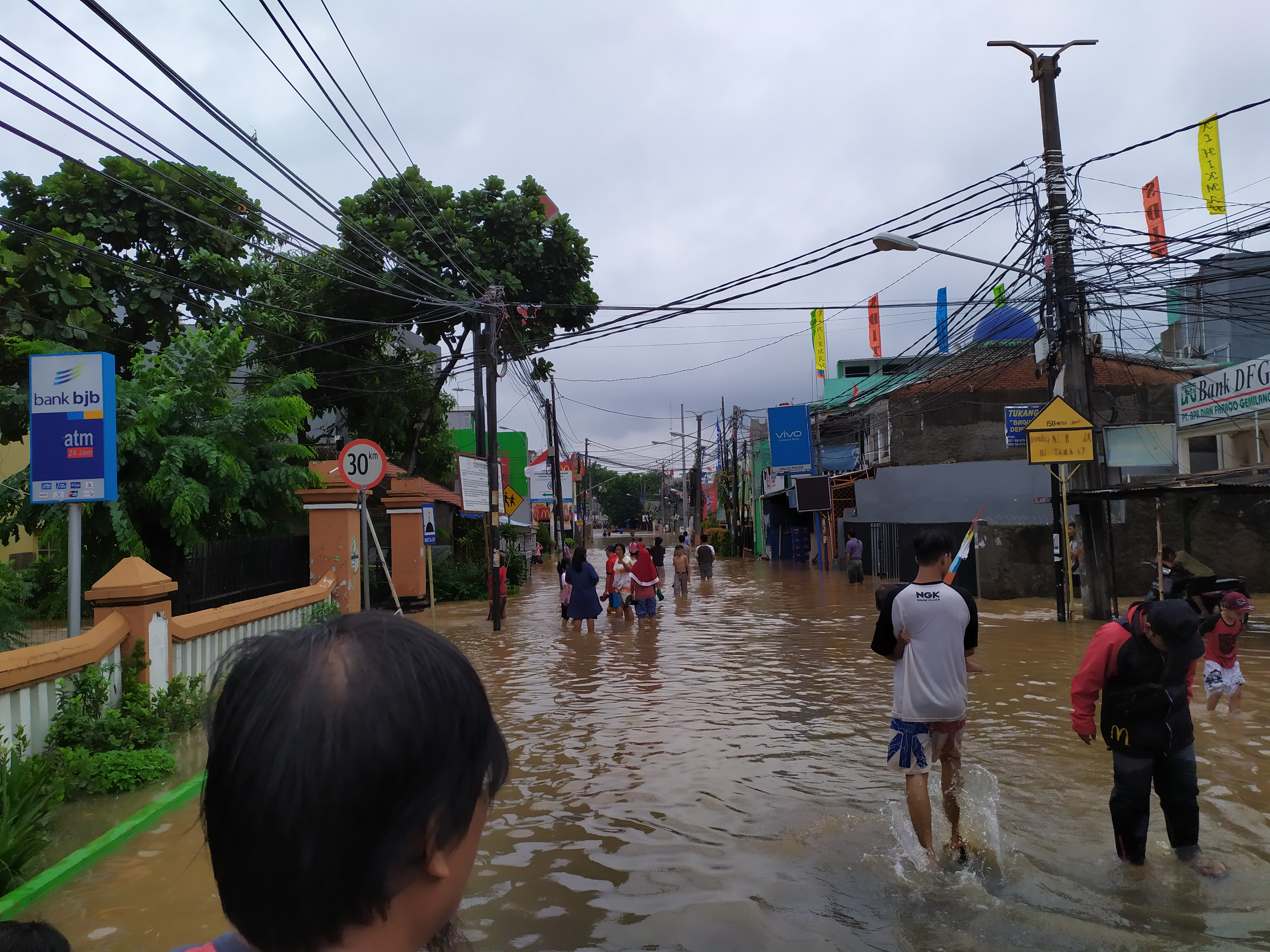
- Flooding on Jalan Raya Bintara, Bekasi, West Java, on 1 January 2020
- Date: 1 January 2020
- Location: Jakarta metropolitan area, Java, Indonesia
- Cause: Heavy rainfall
- Deaths: 66

Flash floods occurred throughout the Indonesian capital of Jakarta and its metropolitan area on the early hours of 1 January 2020, due to the overnight rain which dumped nearly 400 millimetres (15 in) of rainwater, causing the Ciliwung and Cisadane rivers to overflow. At least 66 people were killed, and 60,000 displaced in the worst flooding in the area since 2007.

== Background ==
Floods have hit Jakarta several times in the past, including in 1621, 1654, 1918, 1942, 1976, 1996, 2002, 2007, 2013 and 2015. A significant contributing factor is that a substantial part of Jakarta is low-lying; some 24,000 ha (240 km^{2}) of the main part of Jakarta are below sea level. Flooding can become severe if heavy rain coincides with high tides. When this happens, the high tides push water into low-lying areas coinciding with the runoff from rains in upland areas (such as Bogor) flowing down into the Jakarta area.

Uncontrolled population growth in urban areas, poor land-use planning, and the lack of understanding among city residents and government about floods and its disaster risk exacerbate the impact.

== Impact ==
Multiple floodgates were assigned emergency status due to the high water levels after the rainfall.

From 18:30 WIB (11:00 UTC, WIB is UTC+07:00) on 1 January until 12:00 WIB (05:00 UTC) on 2 January, the government temporarily waived all toll road fees in Jakarta.

At many parts of the city, water levels reached 30 to 200 cm. Some places, such as Cipinang Melayu, East Jakarta, water levels peaked at four metres. More than 397,000 residents had been evacuated to higher grounds. The government had designated schools and government buildings as temporary shelters. In several areas, evacuation efforts were hampered by rushing waters and blackouts.

According to Indonesia's Meteorology, Climatology, and Geophysical Agency (BMKG), more rain with thunderstorm and heavy winds is expected in the next three to seven days, which is likely to exacerbate the current flooding situation.

=== Transport ===
Multiple transportation networks were disrupted, including light rail transit, taxis, trains, toll roads, and the Halim Perdanakusuma International Airport. Soekarno-Hatta International Airport and the Jakarta MRT continued operating normally. Halim Perdanakusuma Airport was closed early in the morning due to the submerged runways, and air traffic was temporarily redirected to Soekarno-Hatta Airport. The airport was reopened a couple of hours later.

== Deaths ==
As of 6 January 2020, officials reported the death toll at 66, due to landslides, hypothermia, drowning, and electrocution. Many parts of the city had been left without power, as the power was switched off for safety reasons by the state-owned electricity firm, PLN. It was the area's worst flooding since 2007 when the rainfall intensity was 340 millimetres (13 in) per day and 80 people were killed in 10 days.

== Responses ==
Cloud seeding planes were used in an attempt to break up the heavy rain.

The governor of Jakarta, Anies Baswedan, tweeted that the government would help all those affected by the flood. Baswedan has also told reporters that he would push new large-scale infrastructure projects, including a dam and a sluice, to prevent flooding again. Baswedan has publicly stated that "I want all the officials in the Jakarta administrations to make sure that all government buildings and schools are ready to be used as evacuation shelters. Prepare public kitchens, healthcare posts, medicines, sleeping mats, public toilets and other basic needs for evacuees," at the time of the flood. Indonesian President Joko Widodo has tweeted that he will rebuild all public infrastructure with anti-flooding measures.

Turkey's Ministry of Foreign Affairs stated that it's in full solidarity with the people of Indonesia and ready to provide any assistance that may be needed.

== See also ==
- Flooding in Jakarta
- 2007 Jakarta flood
- 2013 Jakarta flood
