= Cakung River =

River in Java, Indonesia

Cakung River Kali Tjakung, Kali Tjakoeng
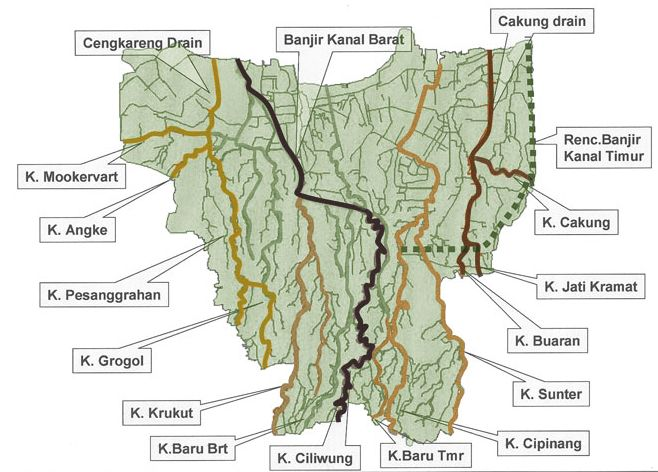
- Cakung River ("K. Cakung"), middle right in the map of rivers and canals of Jakarta (2012)

- Location of the mouth Cakung River (Indonesia)
- Native name: Kali Cakung (Indonesian)

Location
- Country: Indonesia
- State: Jakarta

Physical characteristics
- Source
  - location: Bekasi, West Java
- Mouth: Banjir Kanal Timur
  - coordinates: 6°06′25″S 106°56′26″E
- Length: 39.59 km (24.60 mi)

Cakung River is a river in the Bekasi, West Java, and the eastern part of the Special Capital Region of Jakarta, Indonesia. The lower portions of the original river have been channelized and directed into the eastern flood canal, "Banjir Kanal Timur", which continues to flow to the Java Sea in the district of Marunda, Cilincing, North Jakarta. The river regularly causes flooding in the cities of Bekasi and Jakarta.

== History ==
Cakung and the other two nearby rivers: Jatikramat and Buaran, flow from Bekasi and interconnect until draining into the Jakarta Bay in the district of Marunda through Cakung Drain and currently through Banjir Kanal Timur. In the past, the three rivers supplied water for drinking and agriculture in the area. Some leftover rice fields can still be seen in Cipinang Melayu, the District of Makasar, and the District of Cakung.

In 1990, more people occupied Pulogebang, and the rice fields were transformed into houses. Since then, the Cakung River often overflows during the rainy season and causes high floods. Research by Pieter J Kunu and H Lelolterry of Pattimura University, Ambon, showed that the development of the city changed 85% of land in Jakarta to be waterproof, unable to absorb surface water, and resulted in regular floods. One of the solutions was to construct a flood-control canal, Banjir Kanal Timur. The flow of the Cakung, Buaran, Jati Kramat, Sunter, and Cipinang rivers was cut to drain into the canal, thereby reducing the occurrence of floods.

After the old Cakung River flow in Pulogebang was cut by the flood-control canal, Banjir Kanal Timur, in the old maps there was still a small stream flowing away from the canal, identified as the Cakung River. However, in reality, this stream resembles a street gutter with a width of 1 meter, flowing out starting about 300 meters from the bank of Kanal Timur. The flow of this new Cakung widens a few hundred meters to the north, as can be seen in Rawa Kuning Street, Ujung Menteng, District of Cakung, East Jakarta, reaching a width of 3 meters.

Currently, the old river flowing to Banjir Kanal Timur has a function as drainage from industrial and household waste. It badly affects the river quality, resulting in darkened water and an unpleasant smell.

== Hydrology ==
Cakung River has a length of 39.59 kilometres (24.60 mi), with a watershed area (Indonesian: Daerah Aliran Sungai) of 154.78 km². The average daily rainfall is 142 mm, with the peak debit at 60 m³.

== Geography ==
The river flows in the northwest area of Java with a predominantly tropical rainforest climate (designated as Af in the Köppen-Geiger climate classification). The annual average temperature in the area is 26 °C. The warmest month is August, when the average temperature is around 28 °C, and the coldest is April, at 24 °C. The average annual rainfall is 3674 mm. The wettest month is December, with an average of 456 mm of rainfall, and the driest is September, with 87 mm of rainfall.

== Normalisation ==
Anticipating the flood in 2017, the government of Jakarta widened 1.5 km of the old Cakung River in Pegangsaan Dua, District of Kelapa Gading and Sukapura, Semper Barat, District of Cilincing. The dredging is necessary to remove the mud sedimentation that rapidly narrows the stream.

== See also ==
- List of drainage basins of Indonesia
