= Lenggang Jakarta =

Lenggang Jakarta is a food court area (also known as a hawker centre), which is operated at Monas and Kemayoran area in Jakarta, Indonesia.

The first food court was built at Monas area, which was known at the time as IR-TI parking. The area was revitalized and inaugurated as food court on 22 May 2015, and it accommodated small traders, and street vendors who roam around the Monas area. The price of food sold at this food-court ranges from Rp 15,000 to Rp 40,000 with a non-cash payment system, instead using electronic banking. This venue features beverage vending facilities, toilets, disability toilets, free WiFi and 350 kiosks, including both food and souvenirs.

Another food court was built with similar concepts, at Gang Laler, Kemayoran, which was formerly a prostitution complex. This place was inaugurated on 29 December 2016. After the food court was successfully built in Monas, the city administration also planned to construct another branch of Lenggang Jakarta at Jakarta Islamic Center, Koja, North Jakarta.

== See also ==
- Hawker centre
- Monas
- Kemayoran

== Exiernal links ==
- Official website (Lenggang Jakarta's official website)
