= Cipinang River =

River in Indonesia

Cipinang River Kali Cipinang, Cipinang, Kali Tjipinang, Tjipinang
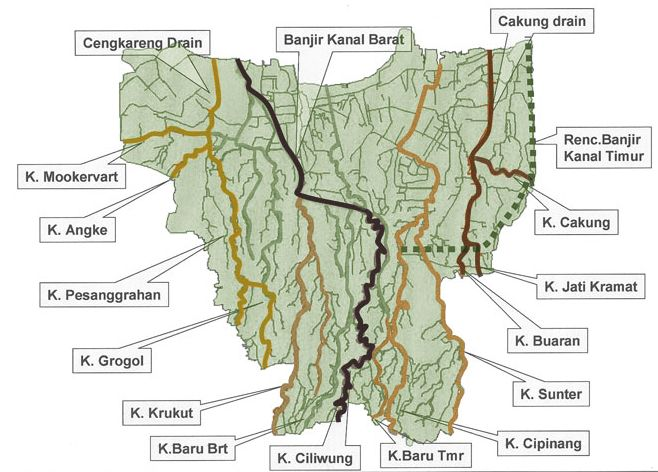
- Cipinang River ("K. Cipinang"), bottom right in the map of rivers and canals of Jakarta (2012)

- Location of the mouth Cipinang River (Indonesia)

Location
- Country: Indonesia
- State: Jakarta

Physical characteristics
- Source
  - location: Depok, West Java
- Mouth: Banjir Kanal Timur, Sunter River
  - coordinates: 6°12′45″S 106°53′44″E
- Length: 37.68 km (23.41 mi)

The Cipinang River is a river in the Special Capital Region of Jakarta, Indonesia. The Cipinang River is a tributary of the Sunter River, conjoining near I Gusti Ngurah Rai Street and Cipinang Muara Ilir Street, Jakarta, but in the middle, it is cut by the beginning of Banjir Kanal Timur, near Cipinang Besar Selatan Street and IPN Street, Jakarta. The river flows mainly in the district of Makassar, East Jakarta, with many houses built on both banks.

== History ==
Cipinang River is upstream in Depok, West Java, and flows to the direction of Banjir Kanal Timur and Sunter River. Its water used to be very clear, and the local people utilized it for bathing before more people settled there. There were many types of fish found along the river: tilapia, Java barb, and catfish. Its width reached seven meters with a depth of four meters.

However, in the last ten years, more houses were erected on both banks. The river became narrower and its water quality was neglected until it turned black and heavily polluted from various industrial sources. Former ponds on its banks were turned into trash collection mounds. Therefore, during the rainy season, the river often causes flooding in the surrounding area. According to the residents, the worst flood was in 2015. In January 2017, after the normalization was initiated, the condition improved, but the flooding still happened.

== Hydrology ==
The Cipinang has a length of 37.68 kilometres (23.41 mi), with a watershed area (Indonesian: Daerah Pengaliran Sungai) of 57.45 km^{2}. The average daily rainfall is 136 mm, with the peak debit at 85 m^{3}.

== Geography ==
The river flows in the northwest area of Java with a predominantly tropical rainforest climate (designated as Af in the Köppen-Geiger climate classification). The annual average temperature in the area is 28 °C. The warmest month is September when the average temperature is around 31 °C, and the coldest is May, at 26 °C. The average annual rainfall is 3674 mm. The wettest month is December, with an average of 456 mm of rainfall, and the driest is September, with 87 mm of rainfall.

== Rehabilitation ==
In 2014 the Jakarta government started the rehabilitation of the Cipinang, from Cibubur to Banjir Kanal Timur. Measurements have been carried out since 2018. The river was widened to 12 meters with a depth of 3 meters. The accumulated garbage was never removed for 30 years until finally, it was transported completely under the instruction of Governor Basuki Tjahaja Purnama on 13 September 2015. For the rehabilitation of water flow, some residents had to be moved, and the government bought the houses and lands along the banks. The government of Jakarta put much effort into this rehabilitation to free East Jakarta from future flooding.

== See also ==
- List of drainage basins of Indonesia
