= Buaran River =

River in Java, Indonesia

Buaran River Kali Boearan
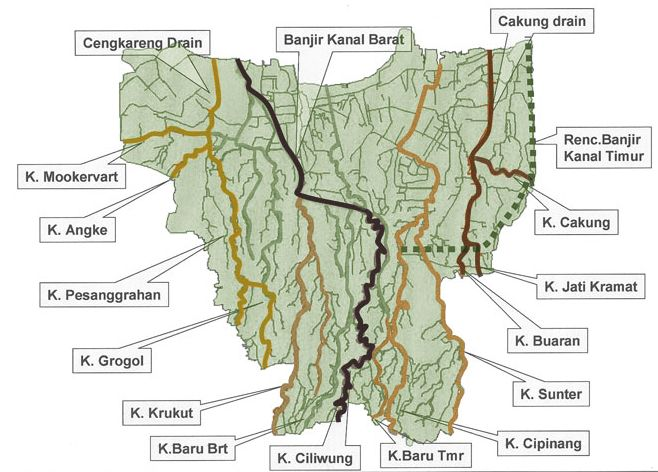
- Buaran River ("K. Buaran"), middle right in the map of rivers and canals of Jakarta (2012)

- Location of the mouth Buaran River (Indonesia)
- Native name: Kali Buaran (Indonesian)

Location
- Country: Indonesia
- State: Jakarta

Physical characteristics
- Source
  - location: Bekasi, West Java
- Mouth: Banjir Kanal Timur
  - coordinates: 6°11′01″S 106°55′44″E
- Length: 18.87 km (11.73 mi)

The Buaran River (Kali Buaran) is a river flowing in the Bekasi, West Java, and the eastern part of the Special Capital Region of Jakarta, Indonesia. The lower portions of the original river have been channelized and directed into the eastern flood canal, "Banjir Kanal Timur", which continues to flow to the Java Sea in the district of Marunda, Cilincing, North Jakarta. The river regularly causes flooding in the cities of Bekasi and Jakarta.

== History ==
Buaran and the other two nearby rivers, the Cakung and Jatikramat, flow from Bekasi and interconnect until draining into the Jakarta Bay in the district of Marunda through the Cakung Drain and currently through Banjir Kanal Timur. In the past, the three rivers supplied water for drinking and agriculture in the area.

Since 1966, based on the information of the river authority (Balai Besar Wilayah Sungai Citarum; www.bbwscitarum.com), Buaran was one of the four rivers passed by Tarum Barat Canal or known as "Kalimalang". Buaran and Jatikramat lie about 5 meters beneath Kalimalang. This canal crosses east-westward through a specially built bridge above the stream of Buaran and Jatikramat.

By 1990 the people could still swim or bathe in the Buaran River. In 1993, the rice field area around housing diminished, and transformed into buildings, especially since the fly-over was constructed connecting Radjiman Street and Radin Inten II Street. The fly-over connects the area of Duren Sawit and Pulogadung. Due to the proximity to an industrial area of Pulogadung, the houses in Kampung Warudoyong multiplied. Semi-permanent buildings were growing along the river banks. Since then, the river has become dirty and dark.

The river often causes flooding in the surrounding area. Research by Pieter J Kunu and H Lelolterry of Pattimura University, Ambon, showed that the development of the city changed 85% of land in Jakarta to be waterproof, unable to absorb surface water, and resulted in regular floods. One of the solutions was to construct a flood-control canal, Banjir Kanal Timur. The flow of the Cakung, Buaran, Jati Kramat, Sunter, and Cipinang rivers was cut to drain into the canal, thereby reducing the occurrence of floods. However, one little part of the Jatikramat River is now still connected to the Buaran River at a length of almost 50 meter. The flow of Buaran itself seems not to change much. The width is nearly the same before or after the canal until the river flows into the Cakung Drain.

== Hydrology ==
The Buaran River has a length of 18.87 kilometres (11.73 mi), with a watershed area (Indonesian: Daerah Pengaliran Sungai) of 13 km^{2}. The average daily rainfall is 158 mm, with the peak debit at 50 m³.

== Geography ==
The river flows in the northwest area of Java with a predominantly tropical rainforest climate (designated as Af in the Köppen-Geiger climate classification). The annual average temperature in the area is 28 °C. The warmest month is September when the average temperature is around 31 °C, and the coldest is May, at 26 °C. The average annual rainfall is 3674 mm. The wettest month is December, with an average of 456 mm of rainfall, and the driest is September, with 87 mm of rainfall.

== Normalisation ==
In 2016 the Jakarta government started the normalisation project on the Buaran River, starting with removing the illegal building along the river banks.

== See also ==
- List of drainage basins of Indonesia
