= UI Forest =

Forest in Jakarta, Indonesia

Ui Forest Hutan UI
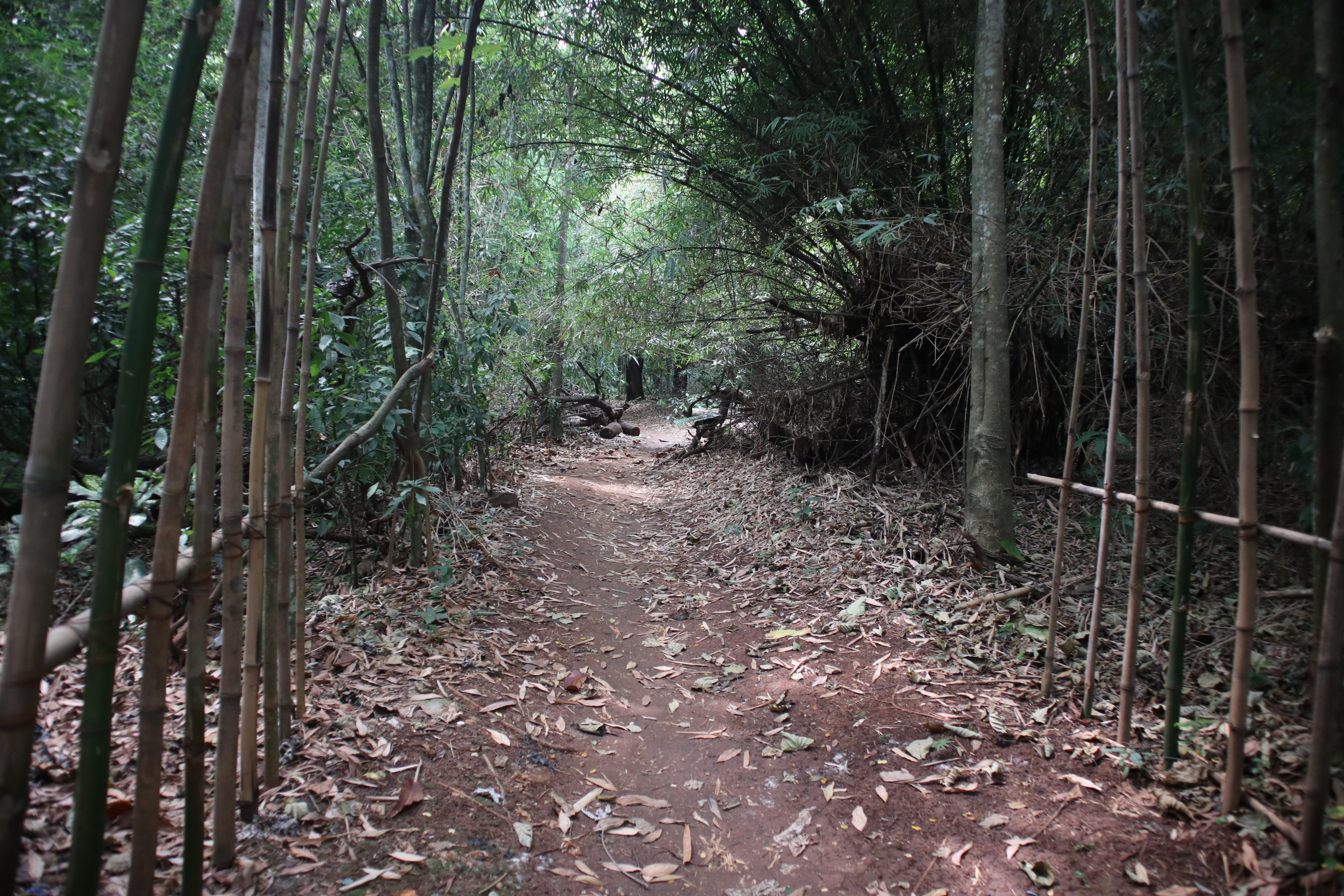
- View of UI Forest

- Location within Indonesia
- Interactive map of Ui Forest

Geography
- Location: University of Indonesia campus, Jakarta, Indonesia
- Coordinates: 6°21′12″S 106°49′43″E
- Area: 100 hectares (250 acres)

Administration
- Status: Open
- Established: 1983

UI Forest, (Indonesian: Hutan UI) is a significant green space located within the University of Indonesia (UI) campus. It serves as a natural reserve and a vital ecological area, providing a habitat for various plant and animal species. The forest covers a substantial area and is used for educational and research purposes, particularly in the fields of biology, environmental science, and forestry.

== Background ==
This forest was established in 1983 on the initiative of Prof. Dr. Ir. Sambas Wirahadikusumah, M.Sc., a lecturer at UI. The main aim of establishing this forest is to create a green space that can function as a water catchment area, germplasm preservation, and biodiversity research area for students.
