= Jatikramat River =

River in Jakarta, Indonesia

Coordinates: 6.23333°S 106.91667°E

Jatikramat River Kali Djatikramat, Kali Jati Kramat
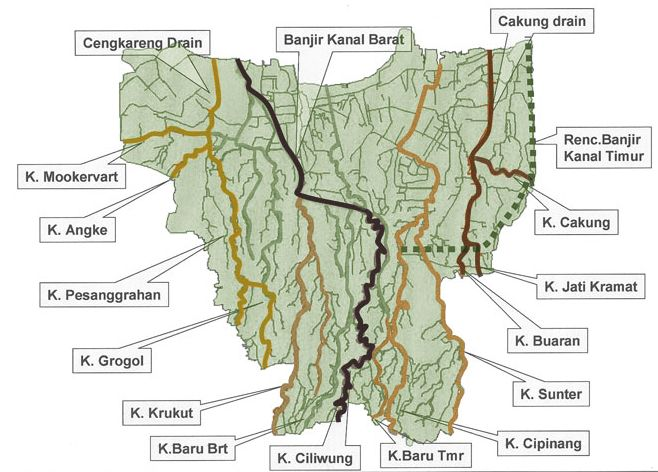
- Jatikramat River ("K. Jati Kramat"), middle right in the map of rivers and canals of Jakarta (2012)
- Native name: Kali Jatikramat (Sundanese)

Location
- Country: Indonesia
- State: Jakarta

Physical characteristics
- Source: Jatiraden
  - location: Bekasi, West Java
  - coordinates: -6.3474, 106.9258
- Mouth: Jakarta Canal Flood
  - location: Duren Sawit, East Jakarta
  - coordinates: -6.2290, 106.9262
- Basin size: 230 ha

The Jatikramat River (Kali Jatikramat or Kali Jati Kramat) is a river in Bekasi, West Java, and the eastern part of the Special Capital Region of Jakarta, Indonesia. The lower portions of the original river have been channelized and directed into the eastern flood canal, "Banjir Kanal Timur", which continues to flow to the Java Sea in the district of Marunda, Cilincing, North Jakarta. The river regularly causes flooding in the city of Bekasi and Jakarta.

== History ==
The Jatikramat and the other two nearby rivers, the Cakung and Buaran, flow from Bekasi and interconnect until draining into the Jakarta Bay in the district of Marunda through Cakung Drain and currently through Banjir Kanal Timur. In the past, the three rivers supplied water for drinking and agriculture in the area. Due to continuous erosion and accumulation of trash, the average width of the Jatikramat was reduced from 10 to only 3 meters in 1990.

The river often causes flooding to the surrounding area. Research by Pieter J. Kunu and H. Lelolterry of Pattimura University, Ambon, showed that the development of the city changed 85% land of Jakarta to be waterproof, unable to absorb surface water and resulted in regular floods. One of the solutions was by constructing a flood-control canal, the Banjir Kanal Timur. The flow of the Cakung, Buaran, Jati Kramat, Sunter, and Cipinang rivers was cut to drain into the canal, and thereby reducing the occurrence of flood. However, one little part of the Jatikramat river is now still connected to the Buaran River at a length of almost 50 meters.

== Hydrology ==
Jatikramat River is a tributary of the Buaran River, originating from a narrow and elongated upstream zone in Jatiraden, Bekasi. This upper catchment area is flanked by the headwaters of the Cakung River Basin (DAS Cakung) to the east and the Sunter River Basin (DAS Sunter) to the west, forming a hydrologically complex region. The river flows from south to north and joins the Buaran River near Pondok Kelapa, Duren Sawit, East Jakarta, adjacent to Darma Persada University. Both rivers are diverted into the East Flood Canal (Kanal Banjir Timur, KBT), which also intercepts the main flow of the Buaran River before merging with the Jatikramat stream. The Jatikramat sub-watershed (Sub-DAS Jatikramat), part of the larger Buaran watershed, encompasses an area of approximately 230 hectares or 2.3 square kilometers.

== Geography ==
The river flows in the northwest area of Java with predominantly tropical rainforest climate (designated as Af in the Köppen–Geiger climate classification). The annual average temperature in the area is 28 °C. The warmest month is September, when the average temperature is around 31 °C, and the coldest is May, at 26 °C. The average annual rainfall is 3674 mm. The wettest month is December, with an average of 456 mm rainfall, and the driest is September, with 87 mm rainfall.

== Normalisation ==
In early 2000, the flow of the Jati Kramat was straightened; the river was dredged and the banks were strengthened with concrete, to yield a width of 5 meter with the depth of more than 3 meter. The normalisation in Pondok Kelapa, Duren Sawit, East Jakarta, was performed since 2015. This normalisation resulted a width of around 10 meter, to control annual flooding. The project was to be completed until the river mouth at Kanal Banjir Timur (KBT).

== See also ==
- List of drainage basins of Indonesia
