= 2007 Jakarta flood =

Severe flooding in 2007

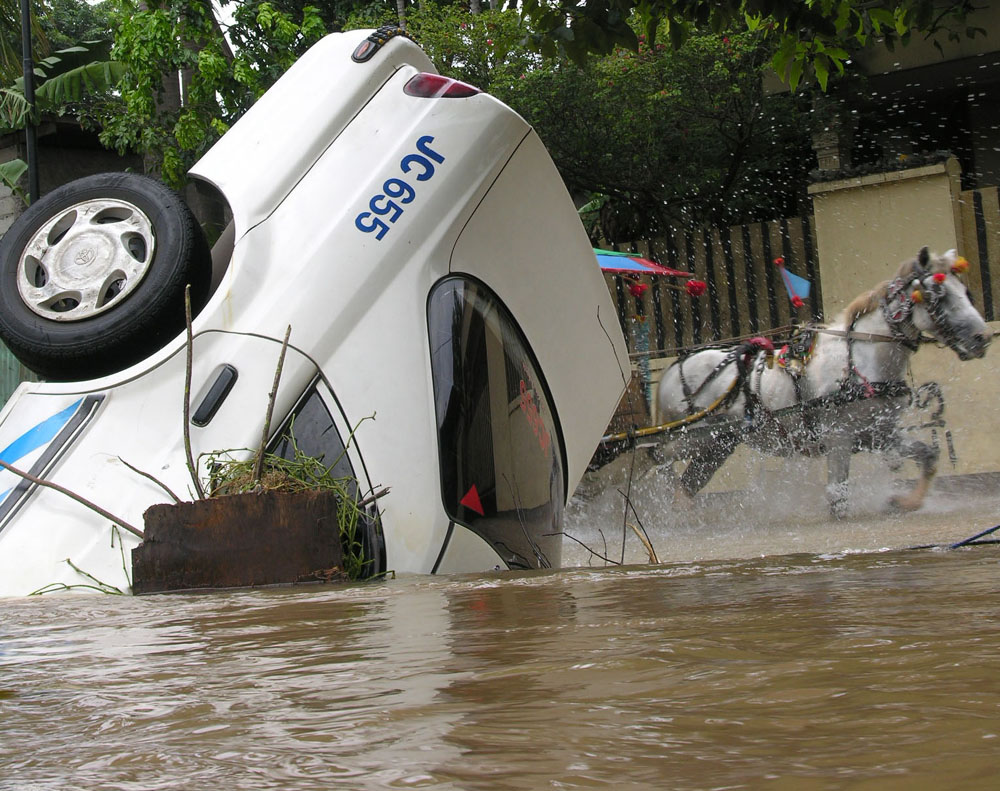
- A Jakarta taxi submerged by flooded water.

Meteorological history
- Duration: 2 February – 12 February 2007

Overall effects
- Fatalities: 80
- Damage: $400 million
- Areas affected: Greater Jakarta

The 2007 Jakarta flood was a major flood in Jakarta, the capital of Indonesia and affected several other areas around the city, such as West Java and Banten. The flood, beginning on February 2, 2007 was a result of heavy rain, deforestation in areas south of the city, and waterways clogged with debris. The flood is considered the worst in the last three centuries, including the 1996 and 2002 Jakarta floods, which killed 10 and 25 people respectively.

The final official death toll was 80.

== Causes ==
=== Meteorological ===
The most significant reason of the disaster is the high rate of rain, since the rainy season in Indonesia starts in December and ends in March. In 2007, the rain intensity reached its peak in February, with the greatest intensity towards the first of the month.

=== Geographical ===
Uncontrolled population growth in urban areas, poor land use planning, and the lack of understanding among city residents and government about floods and its disaster risk are key factors in Jakarta's situation. Eventually, water flowing into Jakarta overflows some of the city's flood control systems and causes devastation in these areas.

== Impact ==
The flood affected 80 separate regions in and around Jakarta, and over 70,000 homes were flooded, resulting in the displacement of some 500,000 people. There was a high level of illness, with 1,066 patients treated by hospitals due to diarrhea and 329 due to dengue fever. The flood has caused Rp 8 trillion (US$879.12 million) in losses. Approximately 190,000 people were affected by flood related illnesses. The nature of the flood in which it extends from riverbanks to surrounding areas has caused the lower-class communities, many of which live on the riverbanks themselves in wooden houses, to take the strongest impact of the flood.

== Aid ==
Aid was provided through numerous organisations, both non-governmental and governmental. Some notable organisations that provided assistance include:

- HOPE Worldwide - distributed 5 metric ton (11,000 lbs) of food, water, medicines, clean up kits to 10,000 people.
- Mercy Relief (Through local NGO ARUS) - provided $67,000 worth of aid supplies to the flood victims. These included 1,650 boxes of milk powder, $5,000 worth of medical supplies, 2,800 bottles of vitamin syrup, two units of glucometer sets, 2,800 sets of uniform and 1,000 school bags.
- Australian Government - provided $150,000 AUD to the Indonesian Red Cross, to purchase emergency food parcels and hygiene kits, as well as assisting in the rebuilding efforts.
- United Nations - Through the United Nations World Food Programme dispatched an initial shipment of 526 boxes of micronutrient-enriched noodles and 702 boxes of high energy biscuits for 2,250 flood victims in south Jakarta.

== See also ==
- Flooding in Jakarta
- 2013 Jakarta Flood
- Flood
- Subsidence
- Jakarta Flood Canal
- 2020 Jakarta floods
