= 2013 Jakarta flood =

Flood in 2013

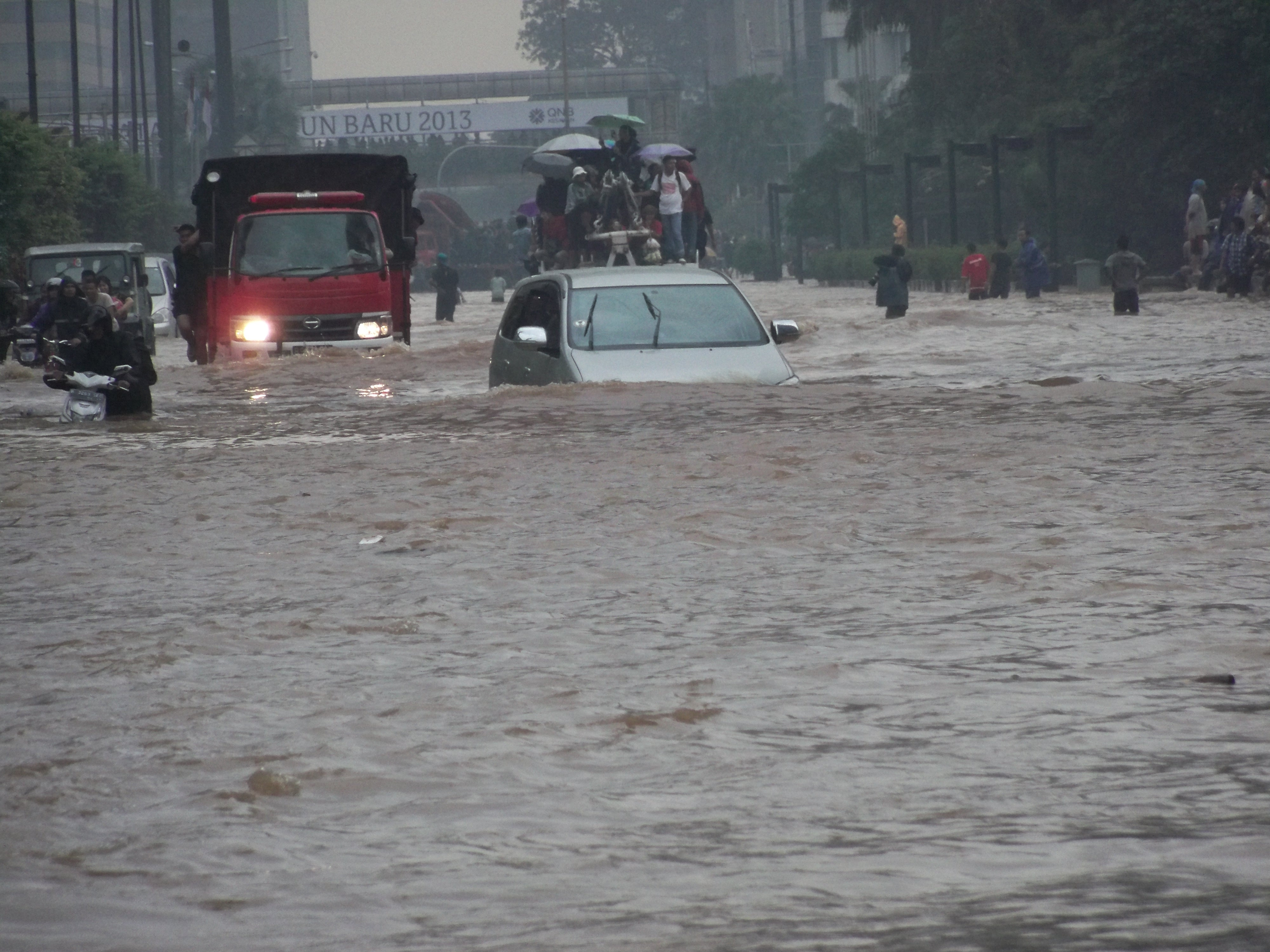
- Flood in Central Jakarta
- Date: 15 January – 23 January 2013
- Location: Jakarta; West Java; Banten
- Deaths: 41

The 2013 Jakarta flood was a flood in Jakarta, the capital of Indonesia, which, in addition to areas in downtown Jakarta, also affected several other areas surrounding the city, such as West Java and Banten.

== History ==
Severe floods have been reported to have hit Jakarta in the past, including in 1621, 1654, 1918, 1942, 1976, 1996, 2002 and 2007. An important part of the flooding problem is caused by the fact that a substantial part of Jakarta is low-lying. Around 24,000 ha (about 240 square km) of the main part of Jakarta is estimated to be below sea level. Flooding can become severe if heavy rain happens to coincide with high tides. When this happens, high tides tend to push water into low-lying areas just as the run off from rains in upland areas such as nearby Bogor is flowing down into the Jakarta area.

== Duration ==
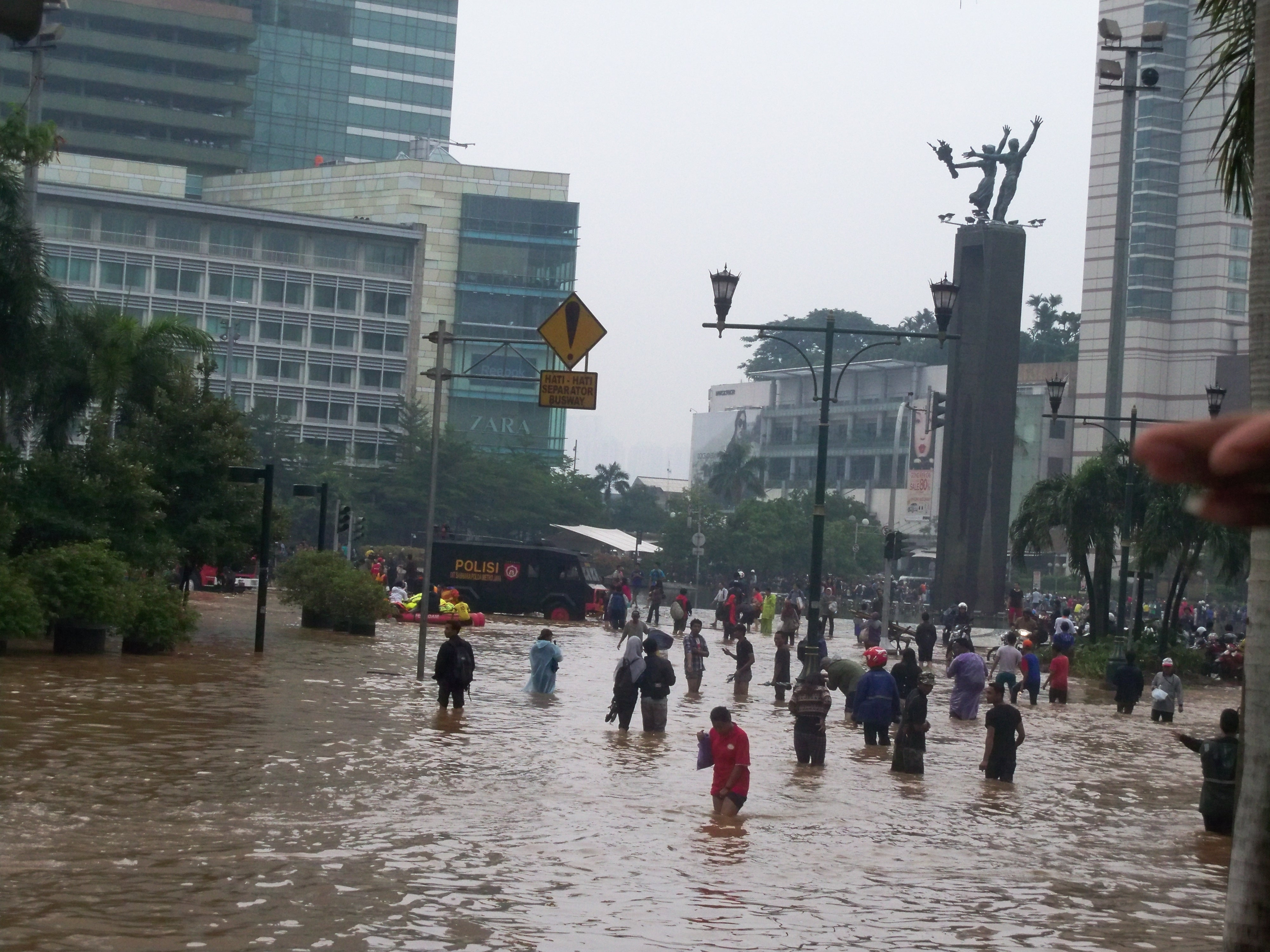
People walk through Jakarta's flooded streets

The flood in 2013 began on Tuesday, 15 January 2013, in some parts of the city as a result of heavy rain and waterways clogged with garbage and other kinds of debris. Serious flooding began along several main thoroughfares of Jakarta. A 30-meter-long section of Jakarta's West Flood Canal dike in Menteng collapsed. This breach quickly caused flooding in nearby areas. A temporary retaining wall was constructed until workers finished rebuilding a section of a canal dike.

The clearing of the land above Jakarta has been identified as a major contributor to Jakarta's water table and flooding issues. Jakarta has a very bad sewage system due to the disposing of trash in roads and sidewalks. There were 41 deaths reported.

== Transport ==
The city's main airport was open but many roads leading to it were reportedly blocked. The flooding disrupted train services from Manggarai Station in South Jakarta to Tanah Abang Station in Central Jakarta. Most commuter trains and buses were suspended, and roads were difficult to access.

Flooding was reported at the presidential palace, forcing the postponement of a meeting between President Susilo Bambang Yudhoyono and his visiting Argentine counterpart, Cristina Fernandez.

== Death toll ==
There were 41 deaths reported.

== Evacuations ==
Evacuations were carried out in parts of Jakarta. An estimated 20,000 people were evacuated on 17 January 2013.

== Nationwide flooding ==
Other parts of Indonesia, from Sumatra to Sulawesi, have also seen seasonal flooding, though it is most acute in the capital city, Jakarta. Five died in Sulawesi, while another 4 died in Semarang by flood electrocution. Yogyakarta is on high alert for lahars, as some 70 million cubic meters of volcanic material still cling to the slopes of Mount Merapi, and heavy rains could trigger an avalanche.

== See also ==
- Flooding in Jakarta
- 2020 Jakarta floods
- 2007 Jakarta flood
