= Jakarta Flood Canal =

Channel in indonesia

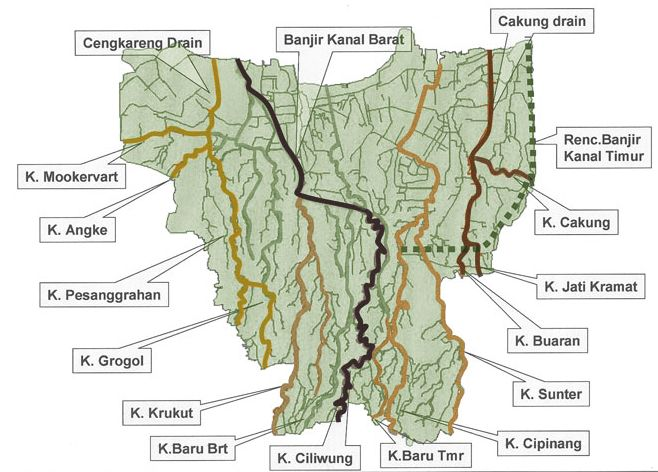
Flood Canals ("Kanal Banjir") in the map of rivers and canals of Jakarta (2012)

The Jakarta Flood Canal (Indonesian: Kanal Banjir Jakarta) refers to two canals that divert floods from rivers around Jakarta instead of going through the city. This first flood control channel was designed by Hendrik van Breen, an engineer working for the Dutch East Indian Department van Burgelijke Openbare Werken (BOW—lit. Department of Public Civil Works, currently the Ministry of Public Works), after a big flood hit the city on 13 February 1918.

== Canals ==
With help of Netherlands Engineering Consultants, the "Master Plan for Drainage and Flood Control of Jakarta" was published in December 1973. According to this plan, flood control of Jakarta would revolve around two canals encircling the city.

The canals divert the water flowing from the south around the city and into the sea. These canals are known as West Flood Canal and East Flood Canal. Other measures to control floods in Jakarta include reservoirs and pumps in areas below sea level. This system was built in 1983.

=== West Flood Canal ===
The West Flood Canal (Indonesian: Kanal Banjir Barat/KBB, sometimes erroneously spelled as Banjir Kanal Barat/BKB) marked the southern boundary of the Menteng residential area. The flood canal was included in the 1918 Batavia city plan and constructed in 1919. It runs from the floodgate in Manggarai, via Pasar Rumput, Dukuh Atas, Karet Kubur, Tanah Abang, Tomang, Grogol, and Pademangan to the sea at Muara Angke. Another floodgate is located in Karet. A still existing bronze plaque on the Manggarai floodgate honours Van Breen and commemorates the canal's first use in diverting the flood of 1919.

In the 1973 master plan, a system of canals was planned to cut to the flow of water in West Jakarta. This was a continuation of Van Breen's canal and would later be known as the West Flood Canal. The construction was delayed by problems in clearing the heavily populated area. After a flood in January 1979, the central government and the provincial government of Jakarta revised the West Flood Canal plan by the construction of the Cengkareng drainage system.

=== East Flood Canal ===
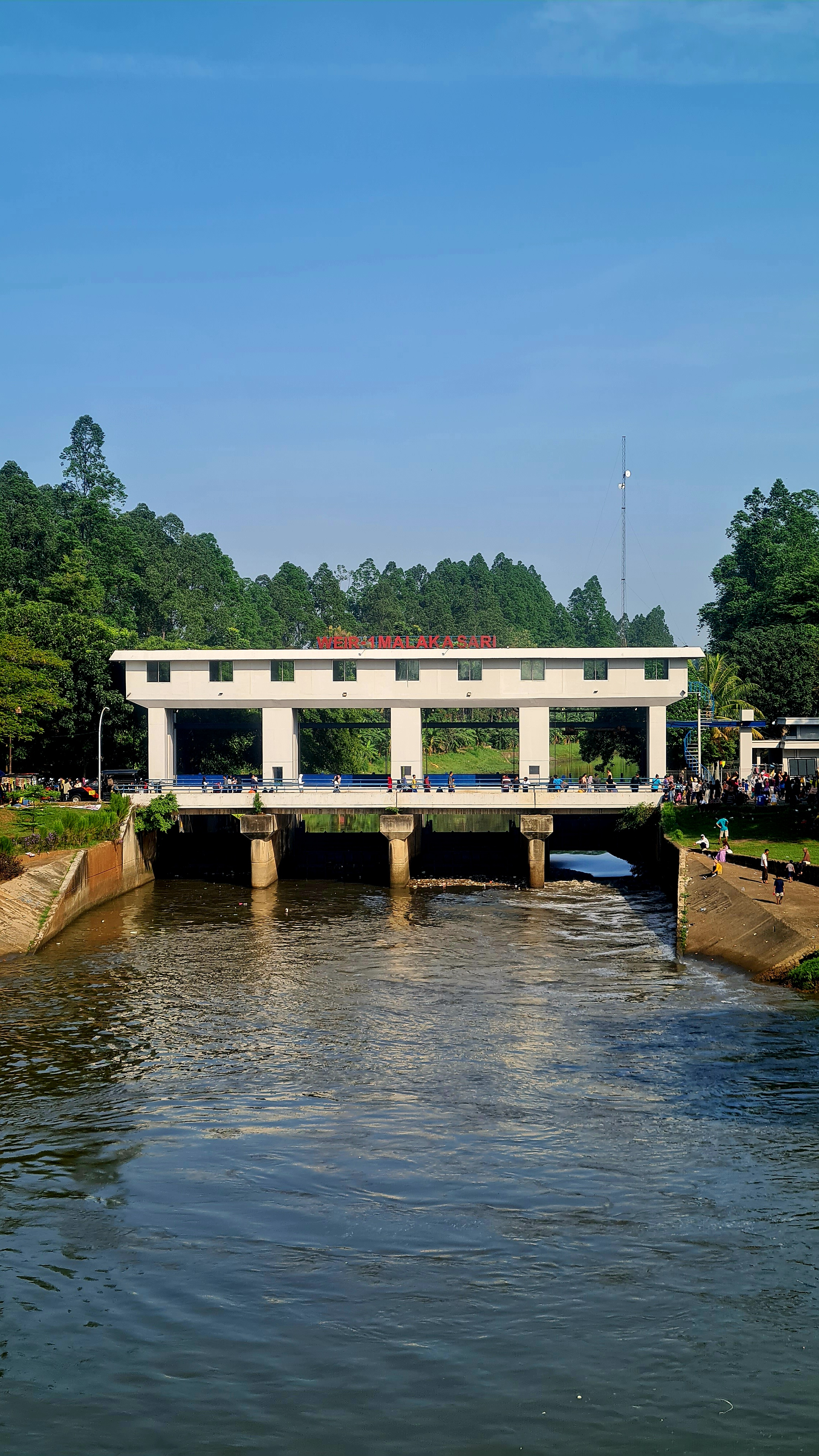
Weir Malaka Sari, located in East Flood Canal

The 23.6 km East Flood Canal (Indonesian: Kanal Banjir Timur/KBT, sometimes erroneously spelled as Banjir Kanal Timur/BKT) flows from East Jakarta to North Jakarta. The width of the canal varies from 100 to 300 m. Construction began on 22 June 2002, but has been delayed due to problems in clearing the area. The East Flood Canal is diverting the Ciliwung River, Cipinang River, Sunter River, Buaran River, Jati Kramat River, and Cakung River.

During the 2013 Jakarta Flood, the East Flood Canal was still not connected to the Ciliwung River. The government connects the two via a tunnel. The tunnel construction was started in 2013. Due to land clearing problems, the project was halted in 2015. Six years later, the tunnel construction was eventually continued and finished in 2023. The Ciliwung ‐ East Flood Canal tunnel was inaugurated by President Joko Widodo on 31 July 2023. With the tunnel itself and other supporting projects such as Cimahi and Sukamahi dry dams in Bogor and the completion of the Ciliwung river normalization, it is expected that all those projects are able to reduce flooding in Jakarta up to 62%.

== See also ==
- Flooding in Jakarta
- Giant Sea Wall Jakarta
