= Sunter River =

River in Jakarta, Indonesia

Sunter River Kali Sindang
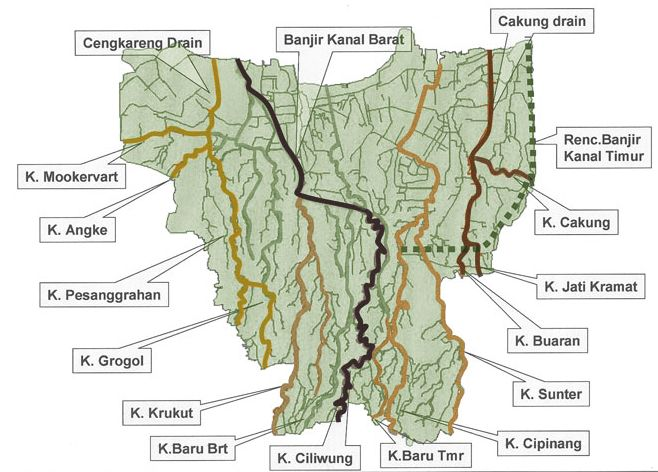
- Sunter River ("K. Sunter"), lower right in the map of rivers and canals of Jakarta (2012)
- Native name: Kali Sunter (Indonesian)

Location
- Country: Indonesia
- State: Jakarta

Physical characteristics
- Mouth: Jakarta Bay
  - coordinates: 6°06′28″S 106°54′24″E

The Sunter River or Kali Sunter is a river that flows in the eastern part of Jakarta, Indonesia. The river is about 37 km long and has 73,184,092 m2 of river basin. Neighborhoods along the Kali Sunter are very densely populated and prone to frequent flooding.

== Geography ==
The river flows in the northwest area of Java with predominantly tropical rainforest climate (designated as Af in the Köppen–Geiger climate classification). The annual average temperature in the area is 26 °C. The warmest month is August, when the average temperature is around 28 °C, and the coldest is April, at 24 °C. The average annual rainfall is 3674 mm. The wettest month is December, with an average of 456 mm rainfall, and the driest is September, with 87 mm rainfall.

== Normalisation ==
The river is one of the 13 rivers that flows through Jakarta. It is currently undergoing embankment installation and river normalization. The length of embankment is 18.35 km, that is, from the bridge of the East Flood Canal meeting in Cipinang Melayu to the Delta Bridge in Jakasampurna, West Bekasi.

== See also ==
- List of drainage basins of Indonesia
- Sunter, Jakarta
- Jakarta Flood Canal
