= Muara Angke =

Coordinates: 6.109260°S 106.772072°E

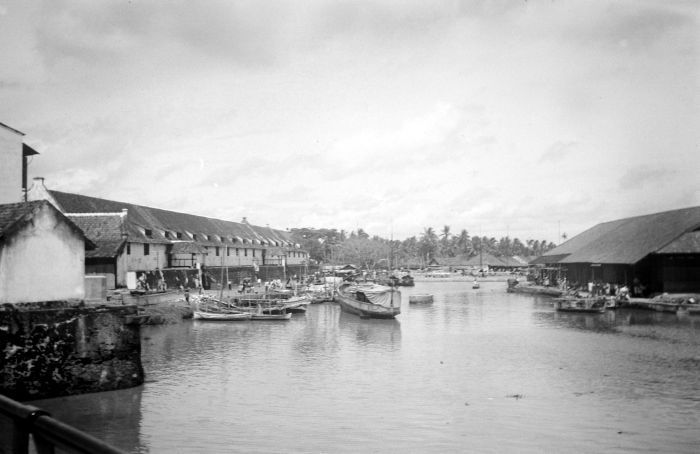
Muara Angke port Ikan during the 1940s

Muara Angke is a fishing port located at Pluit, Penjaringan, along the north coast of Jakarta, Indonesia. The port is integrated with fishermen's housing and a fishing port management office owned by the Jakarta government. It has a modern fish market with supporting facilities for landing and auction of fish. The port is located at the mouth of the Angke River, where it meets the Java Sea. Muara Angke Wildlife Reserve is also located in this area, adjacent to Muara Karang.

== Port ==
Muara Angke New Port.

During the 16th century, the port was used by the Sultanate of Banten and the Sultanate of Demak as a strategic post to capture the port of Sunda Kelapa from the Portuguese. At present other than fishing vessels and landing facilities, the port also has a passenger service terminal for ships plying routes between the Thousand Islands and the mainland since 2012.

== Fishing village ==
The area is inhabited by people who are associated with fishing. This is a community of fishermen who sail, dry fish, smoke squid, clean shellfish, etc. The community is spread over 65 hectares. There is also a center for Traditional Fisheries Products Processing (PHPT), where various types of salted fish, pindang, and smoked products are produced.

In addition to fish processing and drying places, several shops sell salted fish in large and retail quantities. Some of the salted fish is sent to other islands or exported. Fresh fish traders standing along the sidewalk can be seen in the area. The area is prone to flooding.

The fishermen and workers of the fishing industry living there are reluctant to leave the kampung no matter how disorganized and chaotic the environment in the fishing village is. The Jakarta administration is building the Muara Angke Social Housing project which will have 35 blocks of apartments to accommodate the people living in the area, Muara Angke Social Housing project.

== Fish market ==
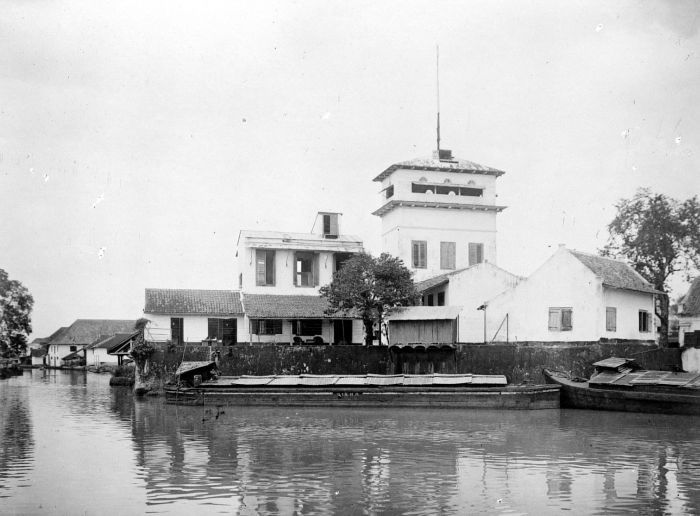
Muara Angke fish market ("Pasar Ikan") during 1920s

The fish market of Muara Angke started a fish auction in 1846, and its history is associated with Jakarta. As one of the biggest fish auction and sale places in Indonesia, this fish market is often compared with the Tsukiji Market in Japan.

The fish market was revitalized and inaugurated with modern facilities such as Pasar Ikan Modern (PIM) in 2018. Spreading over 4.15 hectares of land, the new fish market is a three-story building, equipped with supporting facilities, such as chilling rooms, ice storage, fish packing, banking services, health clinics, culinary tours, laboratories, mosques, parking area, electric substations, and wastewater management installations. The market is planned to contain 900 wet stalls, 69 dry market stalls, 18 fishing stalls, and 68 fresh fish stalls. There are two floors prepared to accommodate traders. The ground floor is for wet fish stalls while the second floor is for stalls selling dried and processed fish. The market is designed to be the first fish market in Indonesia that is built on the concept of hygiene and one-stop shopping for various fishery products.

== See also ==
- Jakarta Old Town
