= Luar Batang Mosque =

18th-century mosque in Jakarta, Indonesia

Luar Batang Mosque Masjid Luar Batang
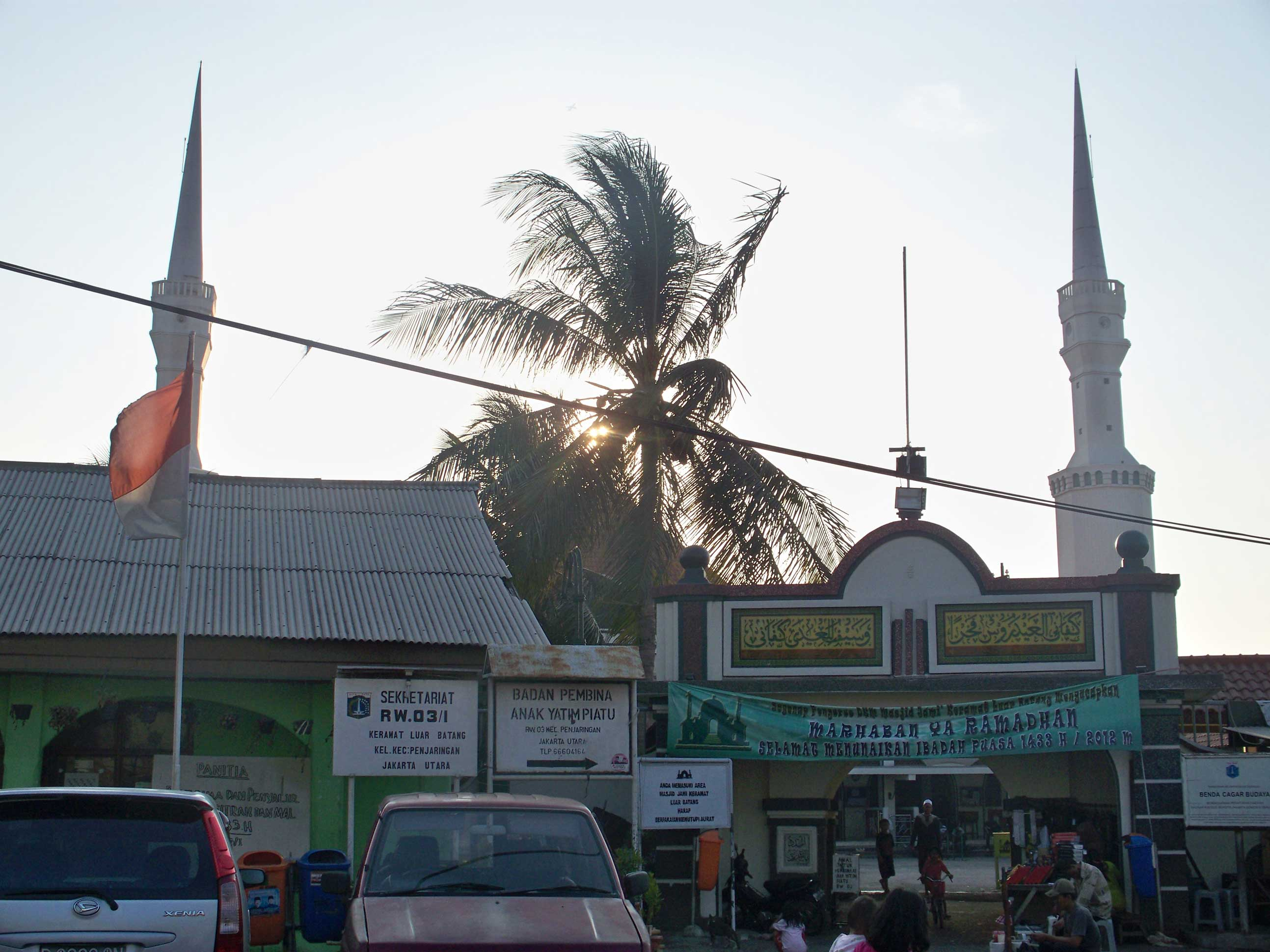

Religion
- Affiliation: Islam
- Branch/tradition: Sunni

Location
- Location: Jakarta, Indonesia
- Interactive map of Luar Batang Mosque; Masjid Luar Batang
- Coordinates: 6.124273°S 106.806969°E

Architecture
- Type: Mosque
- Style: Javanese, Sundanese, and Hindu
- Groundbreaking: 1878
- Completed: 1918

The Luar Batang Mosque (Indonesian: Masjid Luar Batang) is one of the oldest mosques in Jakarta, Indonesia, located in the area of Pasar Ikan (Fish Market) in North Jakarta on the west side of the Sunda Kelapa Harbor. The mosque was built in the 18th century and named after Luar Batang, in accordance with the nickname of a sacred guardian of Islam, Habib Luar Batang, where his shrine is also located.

== History ==
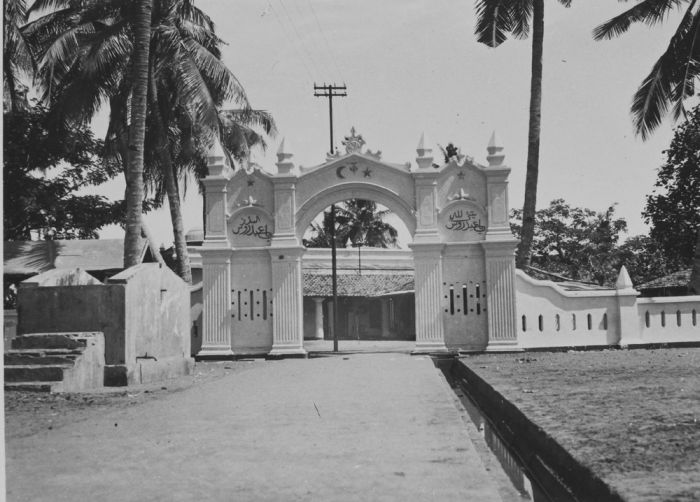
Portal of Luar Batang Mosque cir. 1920-1935

Habib Husein bin Abu Bakr bin Abdillah al-Aydarus was born in Mighab near Hazam in Hadhramaut, but migrated to Batavia when he was relatively young, around 20 years old, to preach Islam. There is a story saying that he stopped by Gujarat on his route to Nusantara. He landed in an area called Kampung Luar Batang when the area was under the control of the Dutch East India Company (VOC). Habib Husein became increasingly popular and many people began to flock to his place to live. This has led to the suspicion of local authorities. So, Hussein and his family were arrested and imprisoned in a separate room in Glodok prison. According to the local urban legend, at every prayer time Habib Husein always seemed to be the Imam in a large holding room, but at the same time the prison officers saw him also was sleeping in his locked cell. On the basis of this miracle, then Habib Husein was released. Habib Husein died on 27th of Ramadhan 1169 AH or on Tuesday June 24, 1756 and buried inside the mosque complex.

Habib Husein is a Sayyid of Ba 'Alawi sada family. His full name is Husein bin Abubakar bin Abdullah bin Husein bin Ali bin Muhammad bin Ahmad bin Husein bin Abdullah bin Abubakar Al-Sakran bin Abdurrahman Assaqqaf bin Muhammad Maula Al-Dawilah bin Ali bin Alwi bin Muhammad al-Faqih al-Muqaddam bin Ali bin Muhammad Shahib Mirbath.

In 1791 a Chinese explorer, named Ong Hoe Hoe lingered in Batavia and wrote about a prominent Chinese among the Chinese who had long lived in Luar Batang. In Ong Hoe Hoe's report written around 1793 and translated into Dutch in 1852, he mentioned about a sage in Luar Batang. "Nek Bok Seng once lived in a wooden hut made of banana tree in a place called the shrine. He lived alone and busied himself with reading and writing books. He loved playing flute, poetry and playing chess cleverly. He was a wise and intelligent man. On Sunday the house was full of friends. He was as excited as our famous man Pok Hoe, respected for the way he entertained people ... Daze and kind of the bong Seng like Chrysanthemums while in his heart it occurred very beautiful. Actually, he may be called and regarded as a wise man of our century " There is no clear explanation whether the person Nek Bok Seng as described is actually Habib Husain.

As recorded on the mosque door in 1916, the building was completed on 20 Muharram 1152 AH coincides with the 29 April 1739 CE. The Qibla direction on this mosque was not precise so it was corrected by Muhammad Arshad al-Banjari (d. 1812 CE) during a stopover on his way home from the Hejaz to Banjar in 1827 CE. The orientation of the mosque is not really directed to Kaaba, similar to Kebon Sirih dan Cikini mosques. Therefore, there are scholars such as Abubakar Atjeh who assume that the original space of the mosque was used as a former residence of the person (Habib Husein) who later used it as musolla or mosque.

The newspaper Bataviaasche Courant on May 12, 1827, also mentioned it in the essay about the Luar Batang Mosque. As noted in this newspaper, Habib Husein died approximately in 1796, after a long preaching journey between Surabaya and Batavia. In 1812 his grave was signed with some stones and still located outside the mosque until 1827 CE. Apparently, at that time charity was no longer given to the commander (a sort of headman) of Luar Batang village, but instead given directly to the mosque committee so the building could be expanded. The newspaper also mentioned that the Sacred Luar Batang Shrine is famous in Batavia. Habib Husein died inside home of Commander Abdul Raup and buried beside an existing mosque. Muhammad Lebe and Abdul Hamid Malik requested to beautify the tomb of Habib Husein, and were granted permission in 1812. People then began to believe that each vow spoken near the tomb is always fulfilled. People requested the mosque committee to often present black goat and its horns decorated with gold cover.

=== Kampung Luar Batang ===
One version of the story why he is so called Habib Luar Batang tells that when Habib Husein died and en route to be buried in the Batavia suburb around Tanah Abang, his body suddenly was not in the coffin. The phenomena lasted up to three times of their attempts. Finally, the congregation then agreed to bury him in the current location instead and the location was then called Luar Batang (Luar, outside; and Batang, body in Betawi language) means a body outside (a coffin). Since then, the late habib was called Habib Luar Batang.

Another story version which makes more sense is that not long after VOC was founded, the VOC authorities started a surveillance on boats entering the Sunda Kelapa harbor, especially perahus belonged to indigenous people. To block the perahus, the VOC authority applied a long wooden beam (which is literally translated to Batang (trunk) in the local language). These perahus could not enter the port and had to wait for days outside the post until the 'batang' lifted, so the local people called the perahus were in "Luar Batang" (Outside the beam). While waiting, many of the crew went ashore. Later they set up temporary huts and became a village. Initially, the village was like an island because it frequently flooded due to the tide water.

In around 1660, VOC brought fishermen from East Java. These fishermen were placed in the village which then was called Kampung Luar Batang or Luar Batang Village. The leader of this fishermen named Bagus Karta was given the honorary rank of lieutenant in 1677. Residential location "Luar Batang" had been a swamp, but soon the swamp silted with mud from Ciliwung river.

In 1739, the VOC Governor General gave a small piece of land on the western side of Ciliwung River across Sunda Kelapa port to Habib Husein. According to local folklore, Habib Husein had karomah (supernatural power) and was influential in spreading and leading Muslims on the northern area of Batavia.

The shrine and mosque is located in approximately 14 hectares area of Kampung Luar Batang, about 3 km from Pekojan. The mosque, considered keramat (sacred) to many people, is one of the cultural heritage of Jakarta, overlooking the port of Sunda Kelapa and is one of the attractions to visitors coming to Old Jakarta.

=== Luar Batang Affair ===
In around 1870s began an affair what was then called Perkara Luar Batang, which is an affair related to the large amounts of charity income the mosque received. At first, two commanders of Luar Batang tried to get the charity, but were hindered by the fatwas of various scholars, notably by the fatwa issued by Habib Usman bin Yahya, who confirmed that Habib Husein's descendants were eligible for the charity. The fatwa was approved of in 1878 by Ahmad Zayni Dahlan, the Grand Mufti of Mecca and a Shafi'i scholar. Since the decision was made, it triggered family quarrel among the Arabs. On the advice of Christiaan Snouck Hurgronje, the mosque courtyard was then closed by the Dutch government until they reach a deal. The resolution process went quickly, and the Luar Batang Affair ended in 1905.

== Structure ==
At the entrance to the complex there is a big white Gapura (gate) which was originally in Javanese Hindu architecture. The mosque structure is square in shape. Inside, the mosque has two large halls, inside hall and outside hall. Each hall has 12 poles, which added up to 24. The number of poles indicating the number of hours in a day, 12 hours of daylight and 12 hours of night. Besides the outside hall, there is a room which is the location of the tomb of Habib Husein and his student, Haji Abdul Kadir. There has been a few renovations performed, so many of the structure and ornaments are no longer the same as the original,

== See also ==
- Masjid Luar Batang
- Timeline of Islamic history
- Islamic architecture
- Islamic art
- List of mosques in Asia
- List of the oldest mosques in the world
- List of mosques
- Islam in Indonesia
