= Kalijodo Park =

Public park in Jakarta, Indonesia

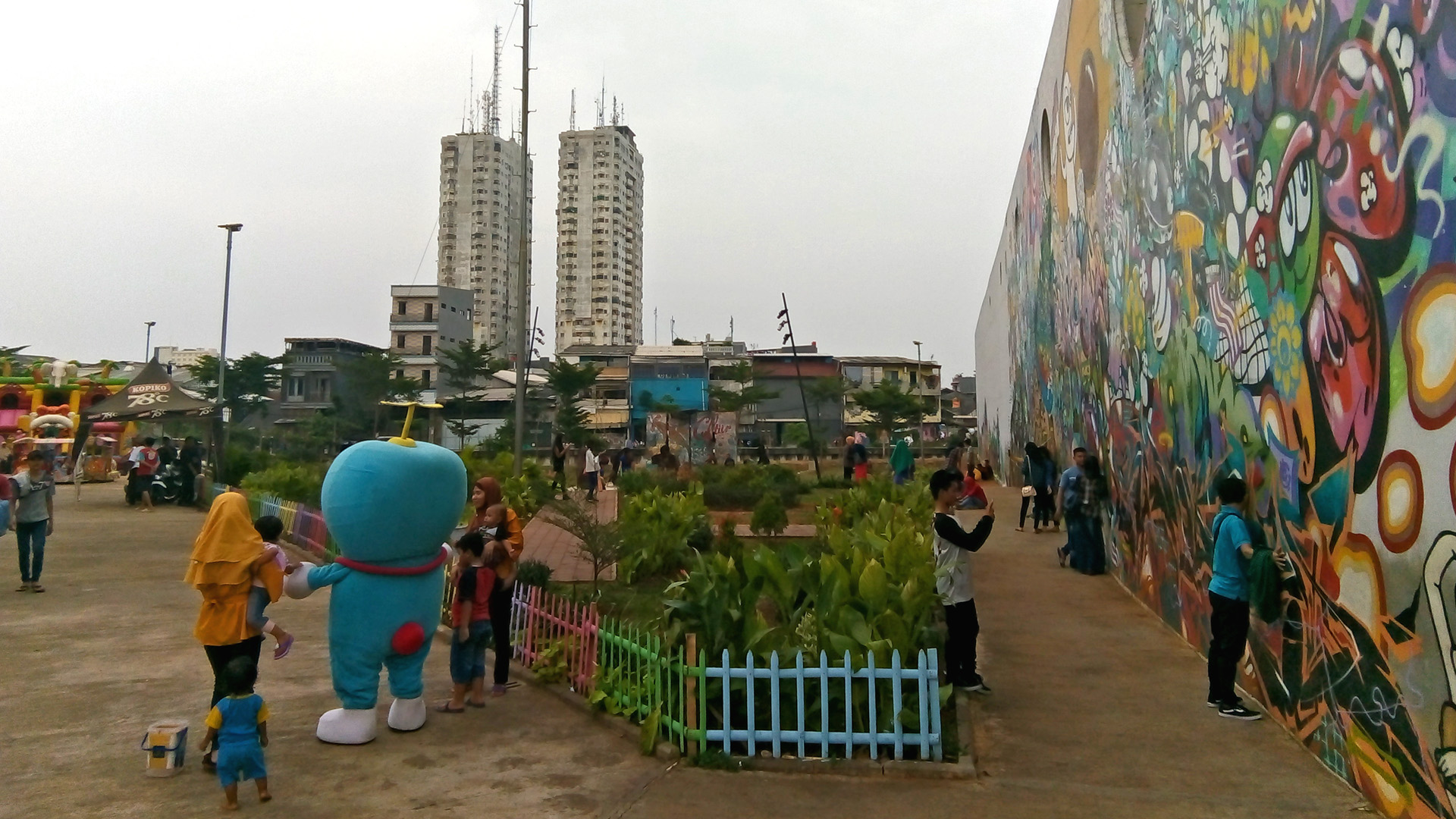

- Location within Indonesia
- Type: Urban park
- Location: Penjaringan, North Jakarta
- Coordinates: 6.139342°S 106.789471°E
- Area: 3.4 hectares (8.4 acres)
- Created: 2017
- Owner: Pemprov DKI Jakarta
- Operator: Department of Parks and Cemetery, Jakarta
- Status: Open all year

Kalijodo Park (Indonesian: Taman Kalijodo) is an urban park at Penjaringan, North Jakarta, Indonesia. The park has a land area of 3.4 hectares (8.4 acres) and located by the side of Krendang River, which was formally opened on 22 February 2017. The park is built after demolishing a red light area.

== History ==
=== Name ===
Kalijodo was not always infamous for prostitution, gambling and alcohol sales. It was a neighborhood for Chinese Indonesians. During the 1950's, It was also a popular public area to roam around, as the Angke River was clean with many trees and greenery, which in turn made the area a popular spot for young people to gather. In Indonesian, kali means ‘river’ and jodoh ‘mate’ or ‘soulmate’. The name stemmed from a matchmaking ritual that developed as part of the Chinese Peh Cun holiday, which is the celebration of the hundredth day in the lunar calendar. One tradition in the celebration of peh cun is a water feast. During the festival, male youngsters would ride on boats down the river and throw bean cakes to members of the opposite sex who caught their eye while floating side by side. Conversely, if a woman accepts, she would throw back with a similar cake. This tradition ceased in 1958 after then Jakarta Mayor Sudiro, who served in 1953–1960, banned Chinese cultural celebrations.

=== Red light district ===
Kalijodo used to be Jakarta's oldest and biggest red-light district. The red light area was demolished on 29 February 2016. At the time of demolition there were about three hundred buildings, with more than sixty cafes and pubs. with about 3,400 population, according to data from the Jakarta administration.

Kalijodo stretches between North and West Jakarta, but most of it lies in North Jakarta. Prostitution began to develop in the Kalijodo area in 1963. But according to other versions, Kalijodo was a red light area since 1600s. Many fugitives from Manchuria used to dock in Batavia. After docking they used to visit Kalijodo to find out temporary wives or concubines for a replacement of wife back at home. The prospective concubines were predominantly dominated by local women, who would attempt to attract ethnic Chinese men by singing Chinese classical songs on boats floating on the river. The woman who was to become a mistress was called Cau Bau, which was considered to have a higher status than a prostitute. Nevertheless, the location had activities with money transactions similar to Geisha concept in Japan.

== Facilities of the Park ==
After demolishing the red light area, the park was built with CSR funds of private companies. The park was built with concept of semi-natural green park, playground, futsal court, hall and international-standard skate park. The skate park is one of the largest in the region, and the mural – a collaborative effort by 10 of Indonesia's top street artists. Kalijodo has turned into one of the family-friendly integrated public spaces in Jakarta, which even used as a concert venue occasionally. The park has four main areas, including a green park, a playground, an indoor football court, an amphitheater, an international-standard skate park and two supporting areas for a Betawi-style mosque and food court.

- Entering the park, a child-friendly integrated public space (Ruang Publik Terpadu Ramah Anak, RPTRA) is to the right, serving as a home to young families with children.
- There is an open-air function hall with a translucent roof and a void with trees planted in the center appear, allowing the breeze to come in.
- The amphitheater beside the function hall surrounded by a 23-metre wall, filled by murals and graffiti done by famous Indonesian mural artists and bombers.
- On the north side a brick-and-steel well monument Sumur, depicting Kalijodo in the 1950s as a place to find soulmate. It was built based on the Sanskrit philosophy of lingam-yoni that denotes sacred fertility.
- The skate park includes concrete ramps, iron railings, stair-sets and is surrounded by a bicycle track.

== Controversy ==
The Jakarta city government has talked of cleaning up the area for just about as long as it's existed. Cleaning up Kalijodo would take not just forceful action, but also the courage and political backing to tackle the entrenched gangs. On 9 February 2016, a 24-year-old drunk driver sped at 100 km/h after consuming ten alcoholic beverages, killing four people, landing in prison as a result for six years, spurring Jakarta city administration to finally demolish the area in a swift way. Following the demolition, human rights groups spoke out, arguing that rapid eviction violated the principles of involuntary resettlement as dictated in the UN's International Covenant on Economic, Social and Cultural Rights, which was ratified by Indonesia in 2005 and mandates consultation with those affected and protections ensuring that no one will be left homeless or vulnerable. Indonesian National Commission on Violence Against Women (Komnas), raised particular concern over the welfare of Kalijodo's sex workers (prostitution is ostensibly illegal in Indonesia).

== Gallery ==
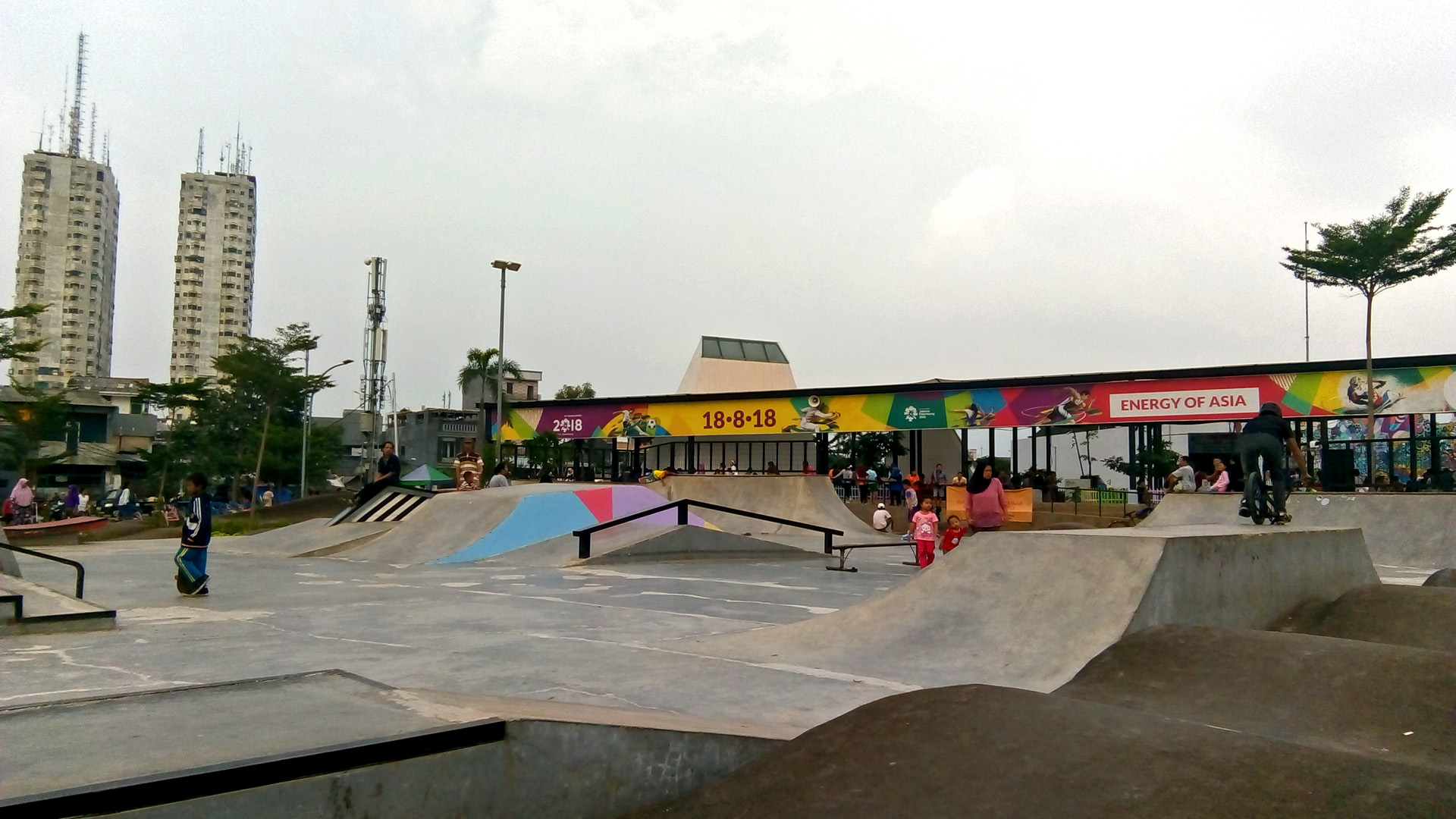
BMX arena and skateboard park

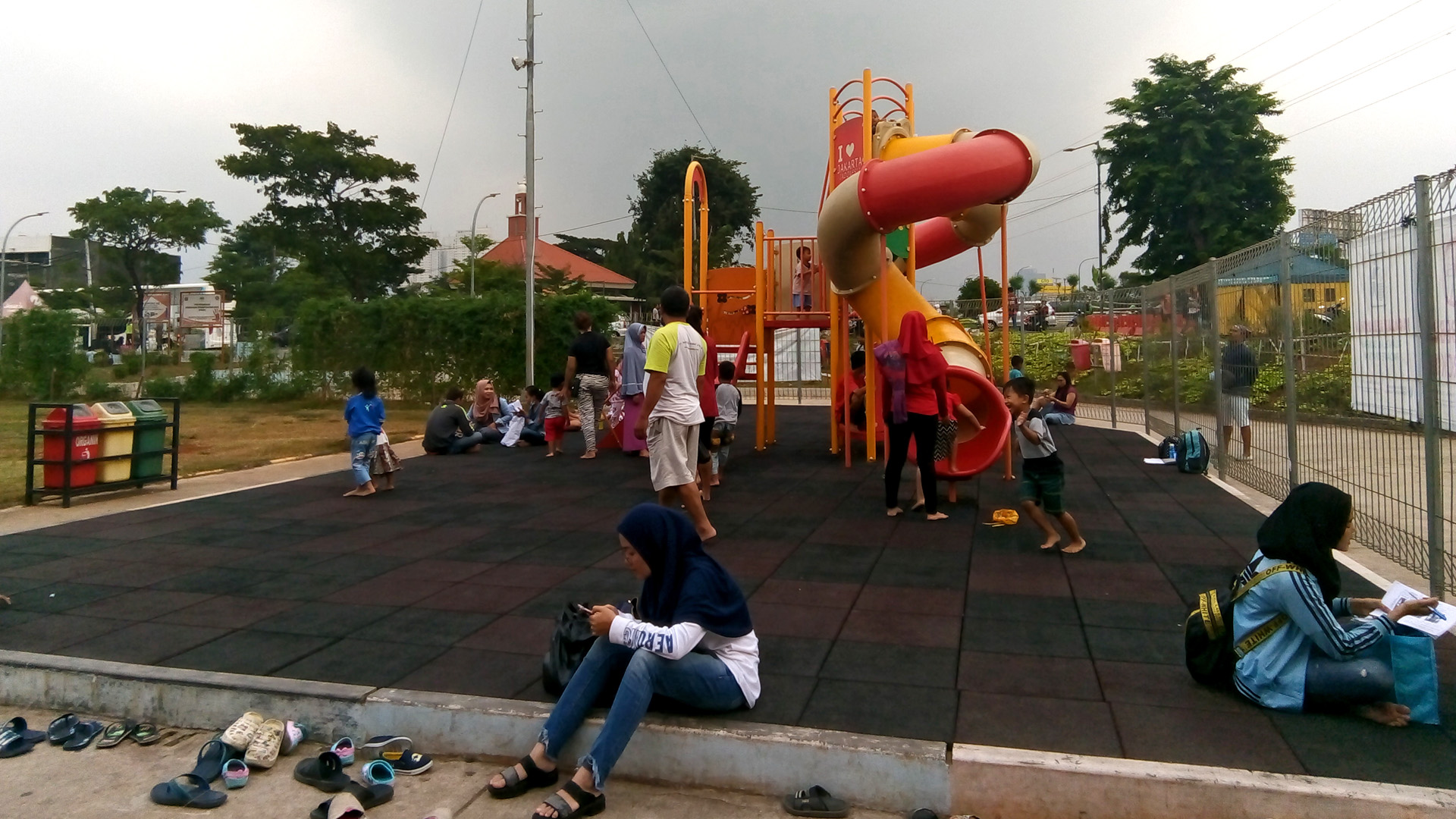
Children playground

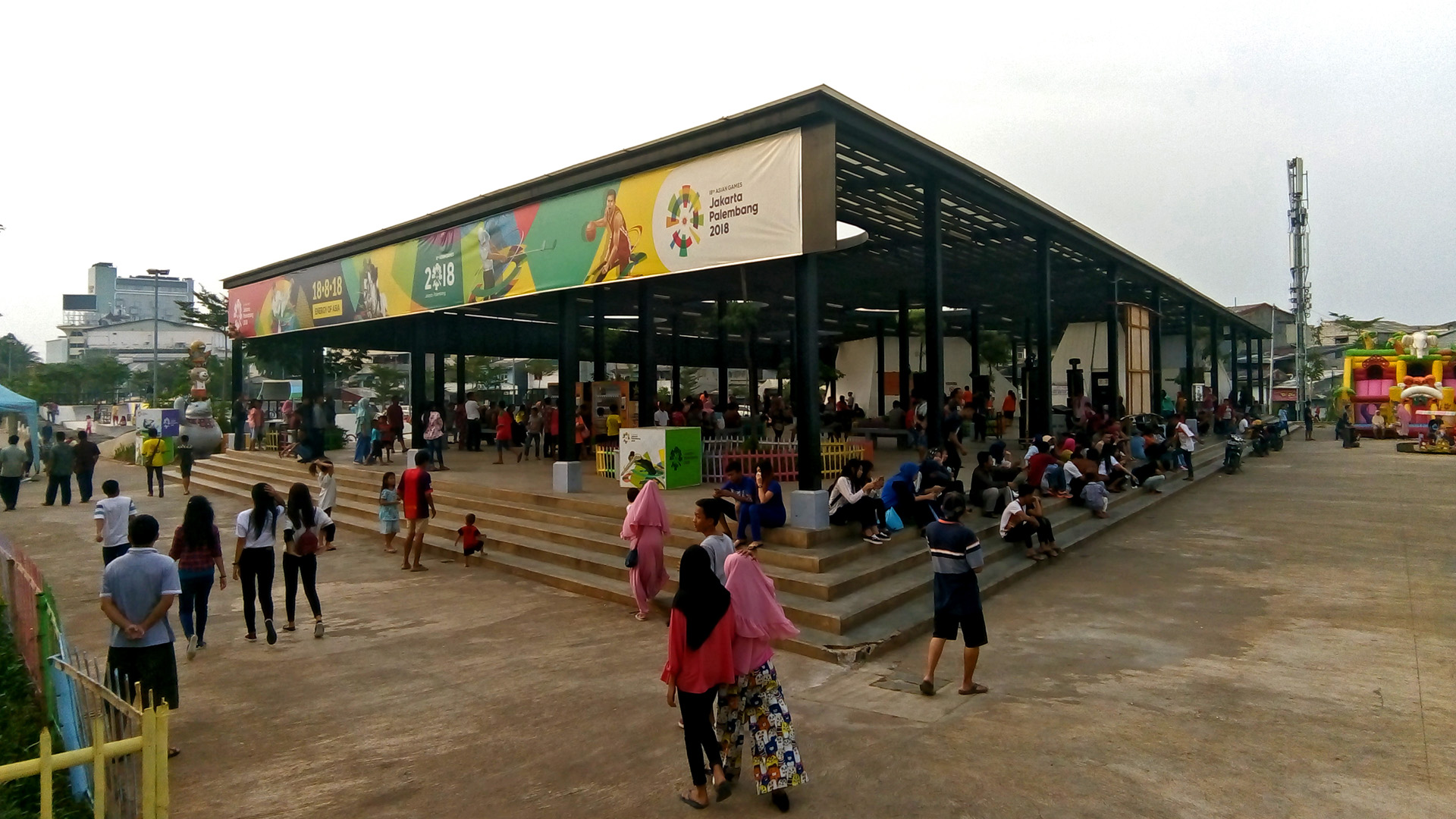
An open-air multifunction hall

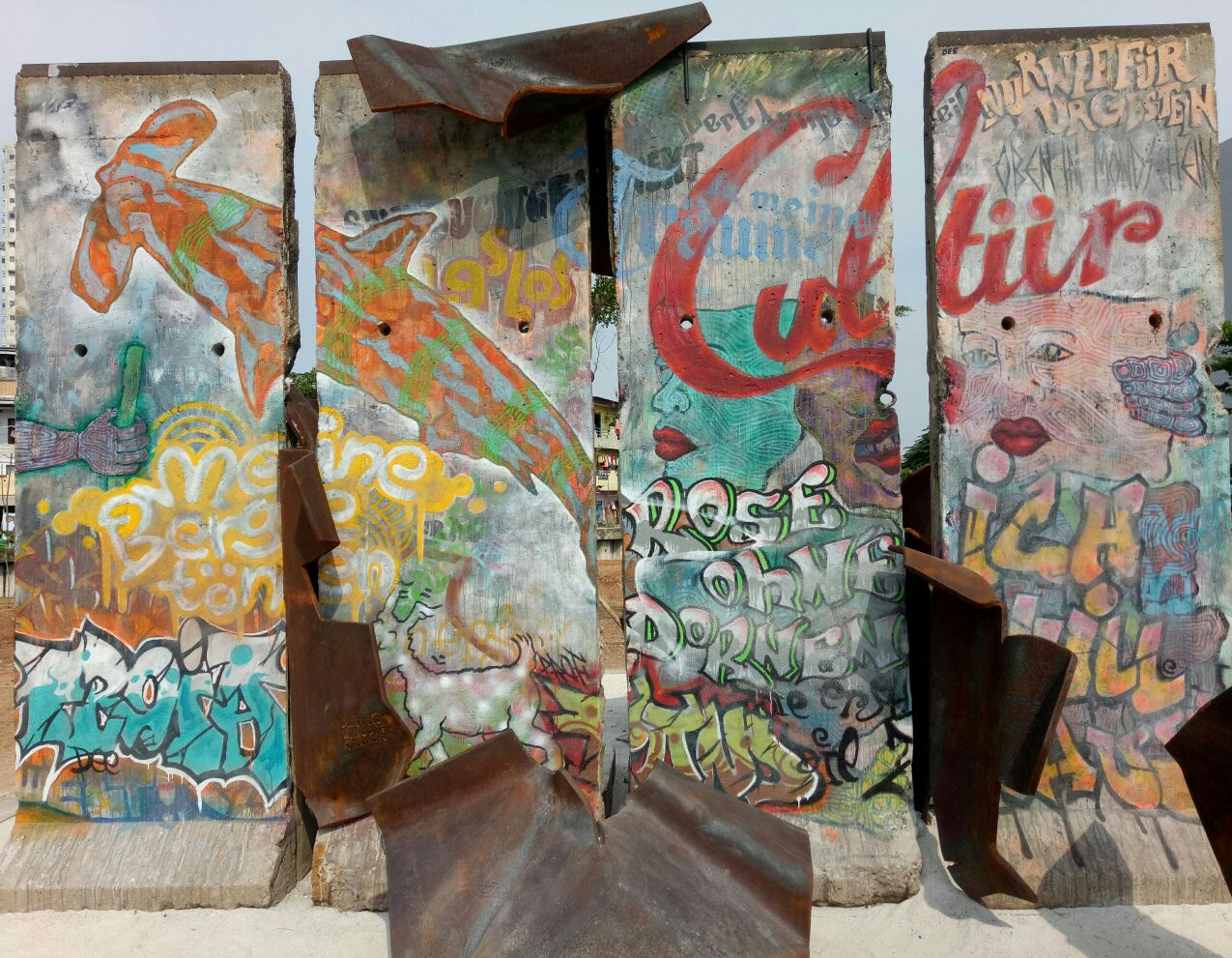
Remnats of the Berlin Wall at Kalijodo Park

== See also ==
- Penjaringan
