= Warakas =

- Administrative village
- Interactive map of Warakas
- Country: Indonesia
- Province: DKI Jakarta
- Administrative city: North Jakarta
- District: Tanjung Priok

Warakas is administrative village (kelurahan in Indonesian) at Tanjung Priok subdistrict, North Jakarta. The border of Papanggo are :

- Tanjung Priok administrative village in the north
- Papanggo administrative village in the west and in the south
- Sungai Bambu administrative village in the east

The zip code of this administrative village is 14340.

== Toponymy ==
The name Warakas is come from Javanese for the kind of fern, which is have genus name Acrostichum aureum
