= Papanggo =

- Administrative village
- Interactive map of Papanggo
- Country: Indonesia
- Province: DKI Jakarta
- Administrative city: North Jakarta
- District: Tanjung Priok

Papanggo is one of seven administrative villages (kelurahan in Indonesian) in Tanjung Priok district, North Jakarta. The borders of Papanggo are:

- Warakas administrative village in the north
- Sungai Bambu administrative village in the west
- Sunter Agung administrative village in the east and in the south

The zip code of this administrative village is 14340.

== Toponymy ==
The name Papanggo comes from the Dutch language term De Papangers, meaning "the people of Pampanga," referring to Kapampangans from the Philippines (then a Spanish colony) who had come to Batavia in the 17th century. Many of them were soldiers who had served in Spain's campaigns in the Moluccas and were later taken prisoner and conscripted into the army of the Dutch East India Company (VOC). After serving the Company for several years, they were granted their freedom and settled in Batavia.

They were considered part of a community known as Mardijkers, whose population derived from Catholic freed slaves originally captured from Portuguese territories by the VOC, as well as those from the Spanish Philippines, taken Moro raiders and sold in slave markets in Batavia. The name was also applied to similar freed Catholic slaves originating from Goa and the islands of Ambon, Ternate, and Tidore in the Maluku Islands.
