= Tanjung Priok =

District in North Jakarta, Indonesia

Coordinates: 6°08′S 106°54′E

Tanjung Priok Historically: Tandjoeng Priok (in Dutch, Javindo, and Petjo)
- Kecamatan (lit. 'district')
- Tanjung Priok

Other transcription(s)
  - Sundanese: ᮒᮔ᮪ᮏᮥᮀᮕᮨᮛᮤᮅᮊ᮪ Tanjung Peuriuk (Sundanese latinization)
  - Javanese: ꦠꦚ꧀ꦗꦸꦁꦥꦼꦫꦶꦲꦸꦏ꧀ Tanjung Pêriuk (Javanese latinization)
  - Chinese: 丹絨不錄 (Hanzi); Dān róng bù lù (Pinyin); Tan-chiong Put-lok (Pe̍h-ōe-jī)
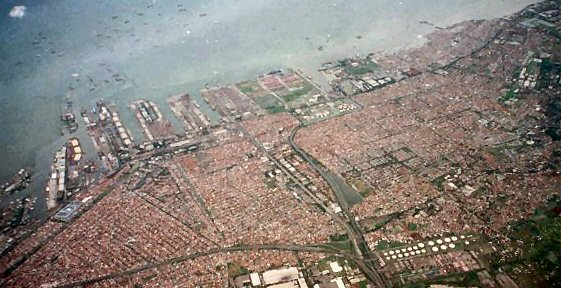
- Aerial view of the Port of Tanjung Priok and its surrounding suburbs
- Tanjung Priok in North Jakarta
- Country: Indonesia
- Province: Jakarta
- Administrative city: North Jakarta
- Postal code: 143XX

Tanjung Priok is a district in the administrative city of North Jakarta, Indonesia. It hosts the western part of the city's main harbor, the Port of Tanjung Priok (located in Tanjung Priok District and Koja District). The district of Tanjung Priok is bounded by Ir. Wiyoto Wiyono Toll Road and Sunter River canal to the east, by Kali Japat, Kali Ancol, and the former Kemayoran Airport to the southwest, by Sunter Jaya Road and Sunter Kemayoran Road to the south, and by Jakarta Bay to the north.

== History ==
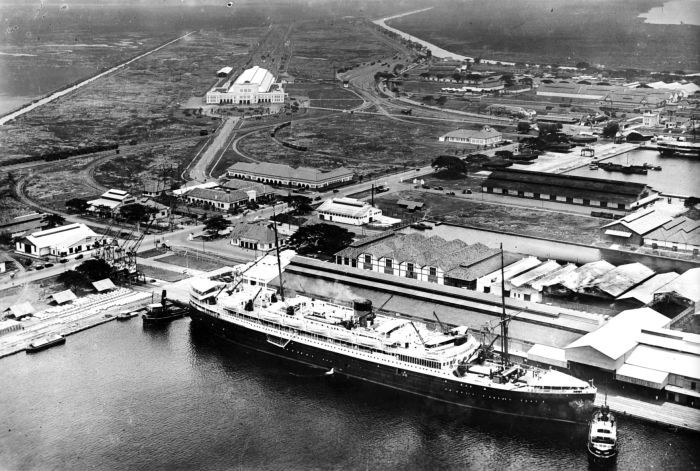
The port with railway station in the background, sometime before 1940

Before human development, the coastal area of what is now Tanjung Priok was an area of brackish water with swamp and mangrove forests.

=== Old harbor of Jakarta ===
During the colonial era, Batavia at first relied on the Sunda Kelapa harbor area. This meant that Batavia had a harbor system like many others cities. I.e. an anchorage at sea at some distance from the city, and a city harbor where smaller ships could attach to a quay. It meant that big ships like the Dutch East Indiamen and later ships safely anchored at some distance from Batavia, at what was called the 'harbor' of Batavia. Passengers and cargo then had to be trans-loaded on smaller ships, that would actually land these on one of the quays of Batavia.

The 'outer harbor' situation of Batavia became problematic when the natural harbor of Singapore became a competitor. In Singapore ocean-going ships could directly attach to a quay. The effect was that for many Dutch East-Indian commodities, it was cheaper to ship via the more distant harbor of Singapore. (At Batavia, a sea going ship from e.g. Surabaya, would have to unload its cargo into boats that sailed to a quay in Batavia proper. Later these boats would have to be used again to load the cargo into a ship to the Netherlands. The same ship could sail to Singapore, and directly unload at a quay. This eliminated the step to transload on boats.

=== Plans for the new harbor ===
The goal of the Tanjung Priok harbor plans was to create a harbor where ocean-going ships could attach to a quay. The increased traffic which resulted from the opening of the Suez Canal contributed to these plans, but the rationale centered on eliminating the need for trans-loading. The effect would be that commodities produced in the Dutch East Indies could be brought to the Batavia warehouses more cheaply. This would put Batavia, and Dutch ships at a more equal foot to Singapore and English ships. In turn, scale effects, i.e. regular supply of cargo, would further redress the balance for Dutch shipping.

==== Construction ====
The construction of the new harbor was started in 1877 by Governor General Johan Wilhelm van Lansberge (1875–1881). The new harbor was named Tandjong Priok. The construction of the harbor was a major project.

Several facilities were built to support the function of the new harbor. Repair facilities were provided by Tanjung Priok Dock of 4,000 tons. A railway connection was established by building Tanjung Priuk Station (1914) and connecting it to the existing rail network.

== Name ==
Below is the list of names used in history during its existence:

Historical names

- (Dutch East Indies) Tandjong Priok (1877–1901)
- (Dutch East Indies) Tandjoeng Priok (1901–1947) (EVO)
- (Indonesia) Tandjung Priok (1947–1972) (Soewandi)
- (Indonesia) Tanjung Priok (1972–present) (EYD)

== Administrative villages (kelurahan) ==
The district of Tanjung Priok is divided into seven kelurahan or subdistricts:

Subdistrict	Area code
Tanjung Priok	14310
Kebon Bawang	14320
Sungai Bambu	14330
Papanggo	14340
Warakas	14340
Sunter Agung	14350
Sunter Jaya	14350

== Important places ==
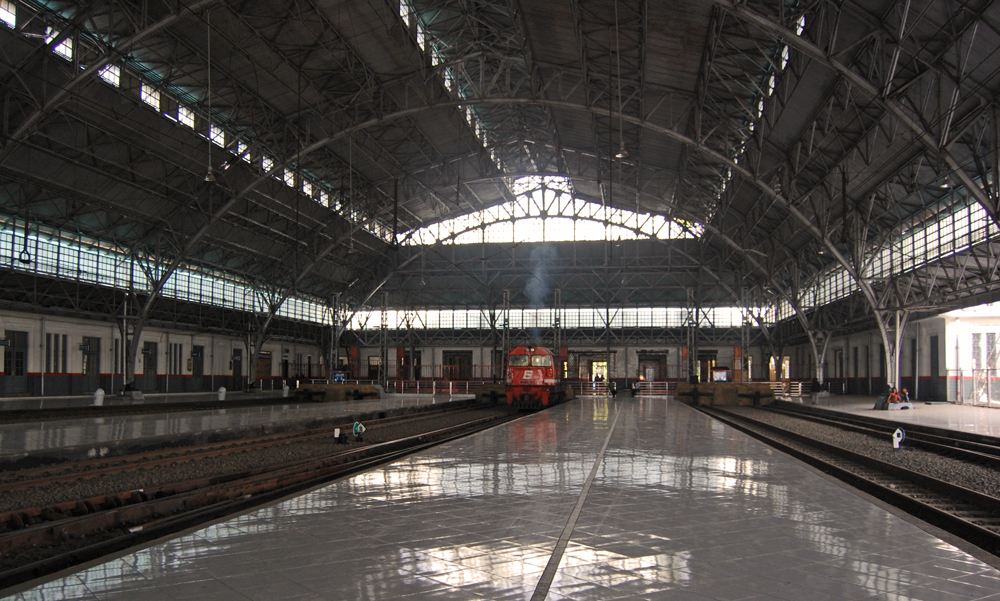
Tanjung Priuk Station

- Port of Tanjung Priok
- Tanjung Priuk railway station (1914)
- Jakarta International Stadium

On November 20, 2011, the Jakarta administration inaugurated the city's first railways tourism package aimed at attracting more tourists and reducing traffic congestion from Gambir railway station to the Tanjung Priuk railway station.

== Incident ==
=== 1984 Riots ===
Tanjung Priok was the site of a widely publicized incident on September 12, 1984, when army forces fired on a group of Muslim protesters. The protesters were demonstrating against proposed government regulations that would require all formal organisations in the country to adopt Pancasila as their ideology. Along the way, the group's numbers swelled, with estimates ranging between 1,500 and several thousand. The protesters held a march while damaging and burning down a number of buildings, and surrounded the North Jakarta Military District Command until 11pm finally clashed with the authorities who then shot at them.

There were conflicting reports about the total death toll, but most sources indicate that several hundred protesters were killed. After the fall of Suharto the case was taken up again, and in 2003 fourteen people, among them a former commander of the Kopassus special forces unit, were named as suspects in the 1984 killings.

== See also ==
- List of East Asian ports
