= Maritime Museum (Indonesia) =

Maritime museum in Jakarta, Indonesia

Maritime Museum Museum Bahari
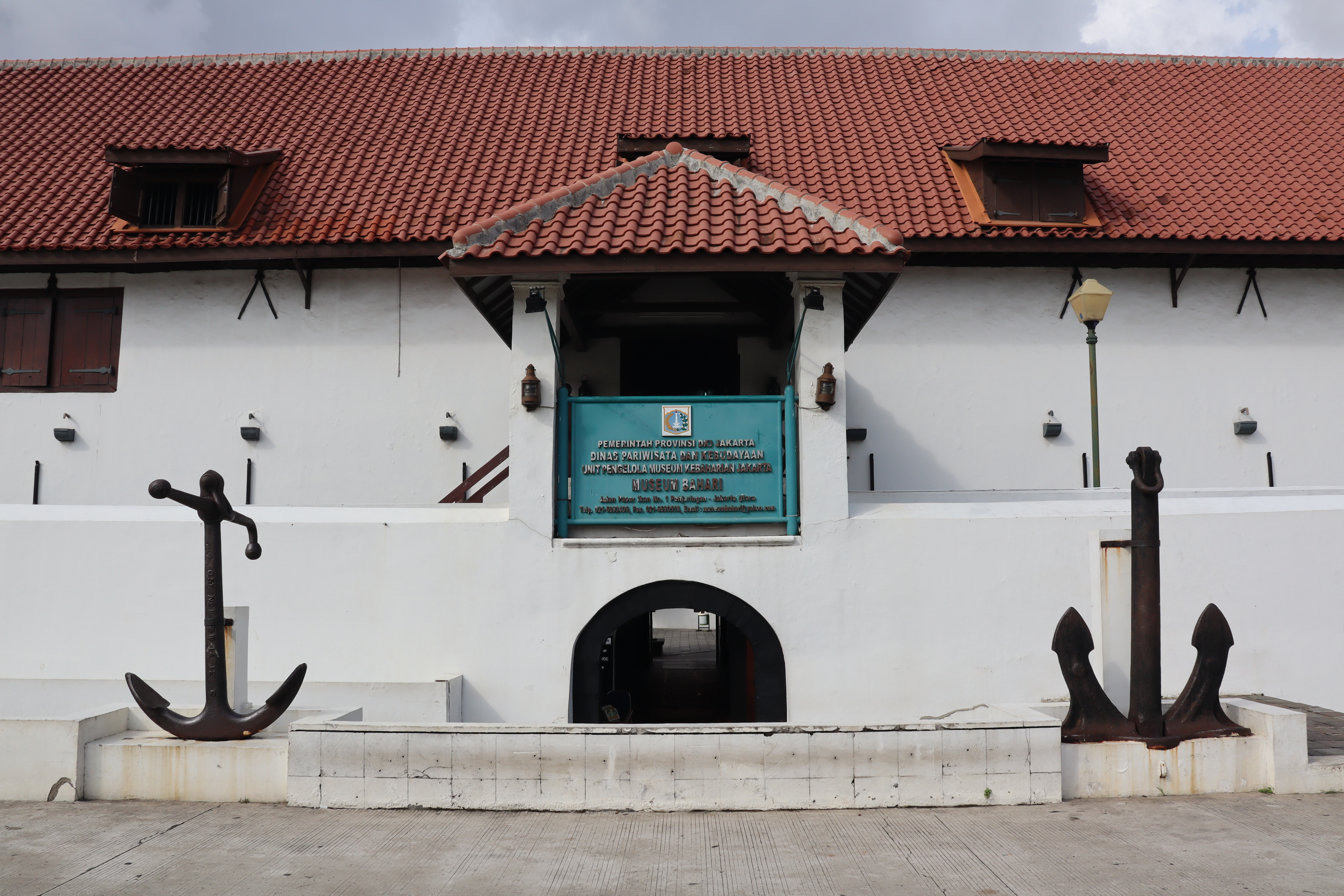
- Entrance to the Museum

- Location within Jakarta
- Established: July 7, 1977
- Location: Jl. Pasar Ikan 1, Sunda Kelapa, Jakarta 14440, Indonesia
- Coordinates: 6°7′37.14″S 106°48′29.88″E
- Type: Maritime museum
- Director: Taufik Ahmad
- Website: www.museumbahari.org

The Maritime Museum (Indonesian: Museum Bahari) is located in the old Sunda Kelapa harbor area in Penjaringan Administrative Village, Penjaringan Subdistrict, Jakarta, Indonesia. The museum was inaugurated inside the former Dutch East India Company warehouses. The museum focuses on the maritime history of Indonesia and the importance of the sea to the economy of present-day Indonesia.

The museum displays models of fishing boats and other maritime objects from different parts of Indonesia. The museum also exhibits the celebrated Pinisi schooners of the Bugis people of South Sulawesi, which at present make up one of the last sea-going sailing fleets in the world. In January 2018, much of the museum was destroyed by a fire. The goods inside the burnt museum were evacuated later than from the fire. The cause of the fire was caused by an electric short circuit.

== History and the building ==
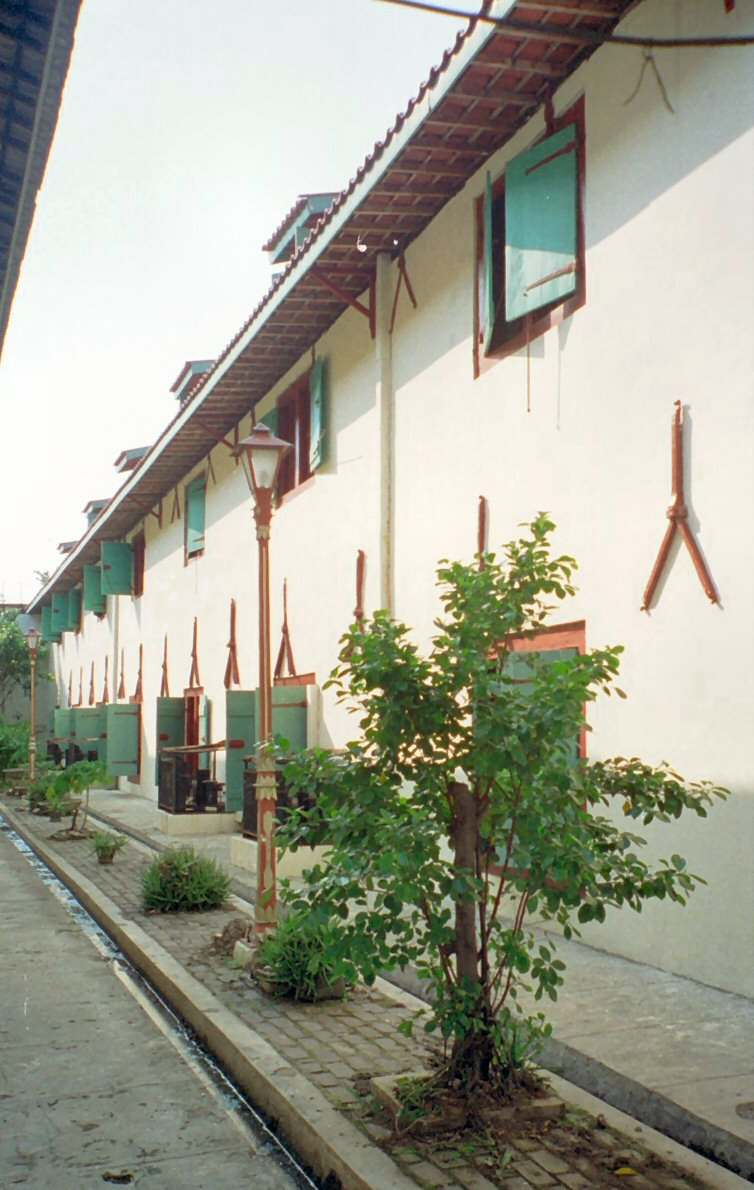
Dutch style warehouse in the museum.

The Maritime Museum was installed in former Dutch East India Company warehouses. The warehouses were built beside the mouth of the Ciliwung River, the main river of Jakarta. The warehouses are divided into two parts: the Westzijdsche Pakhuizen or "warehouses of the west bank" (constructed from 1652–1771) and the Oostzijdsche Pakhuizen or "warehouses of the east bank". The west warehouse consists of four building units, three of which are now used for the museum. These were formerly used to store spices e.g. nutmeg and pepper. Also, coffee, tea, and cloth were stored here before being shipped to various ports in Asia and Europe.

Some of the warehouses were rebuilt at the end of the 17th century to create more space between the city wall and the warehouses. Different dates on stones appear above some doors of the museum which probably refer to the years when repairs, extensions, or additions to the warehouses were executed.

Between the warehouses and the city wall in front of the museum, the Company kept supplies of copper and tin. These metals were protected against rain by a wooden gallery attached to the front of the godowns. This broad gallery was also used by guards on patrol because the path on the city wall in front of it was rather narrow. The wooden gallery was attached to the second floor of the warehouses facing the waterfront but has long since been taken away. The big iron hooks which once supported the gallery can still be seen.

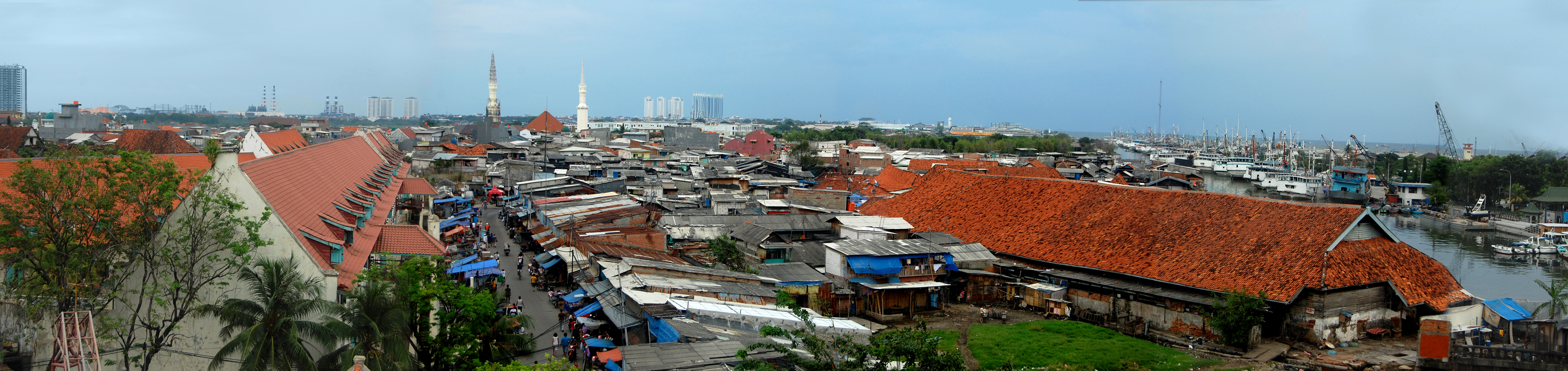
Panoramic view of Maritime Museum (left) and Sunda Kelapa port (right) seen from the Harbormaster Tower. The view is toward the south

The remaining city wall in front of the Maritime Museum onwards to the bastion Zeeburg and a bit further west is all that is left of the wall that once surrounded Batavia during the 17th and 18th centuries. Only Zeeburg and Culemborg remain out of the twenty-three bastions from that period. The Menara Syahbandar (also known as de Uitkijk), situated about 50 meters from the Maritime Museum, is the former watch tower that was built on the remains of the old bastion Culemborg. The watch tower acted as a signal box and observation post since 1839 over the roads of Batavia. Before 1839, the signals with the ships were exchanged from the flagpole at the old VOC-shipyard situated straight behind the watchtower. The tower lost part of its function after 1886 when the new harbor of Tanjung Priok was opened.

During the Japanese occupation, the warehouses were used as logistics storage for the Japanese army. After Indonesian independence, it was used as a warehouse for PLN and PTT. In 1976, the building was declared a cultural property. The building was inaugurated as a museum displaying the maritime history of Indonesia on July 7, 1977.

== Collection ==
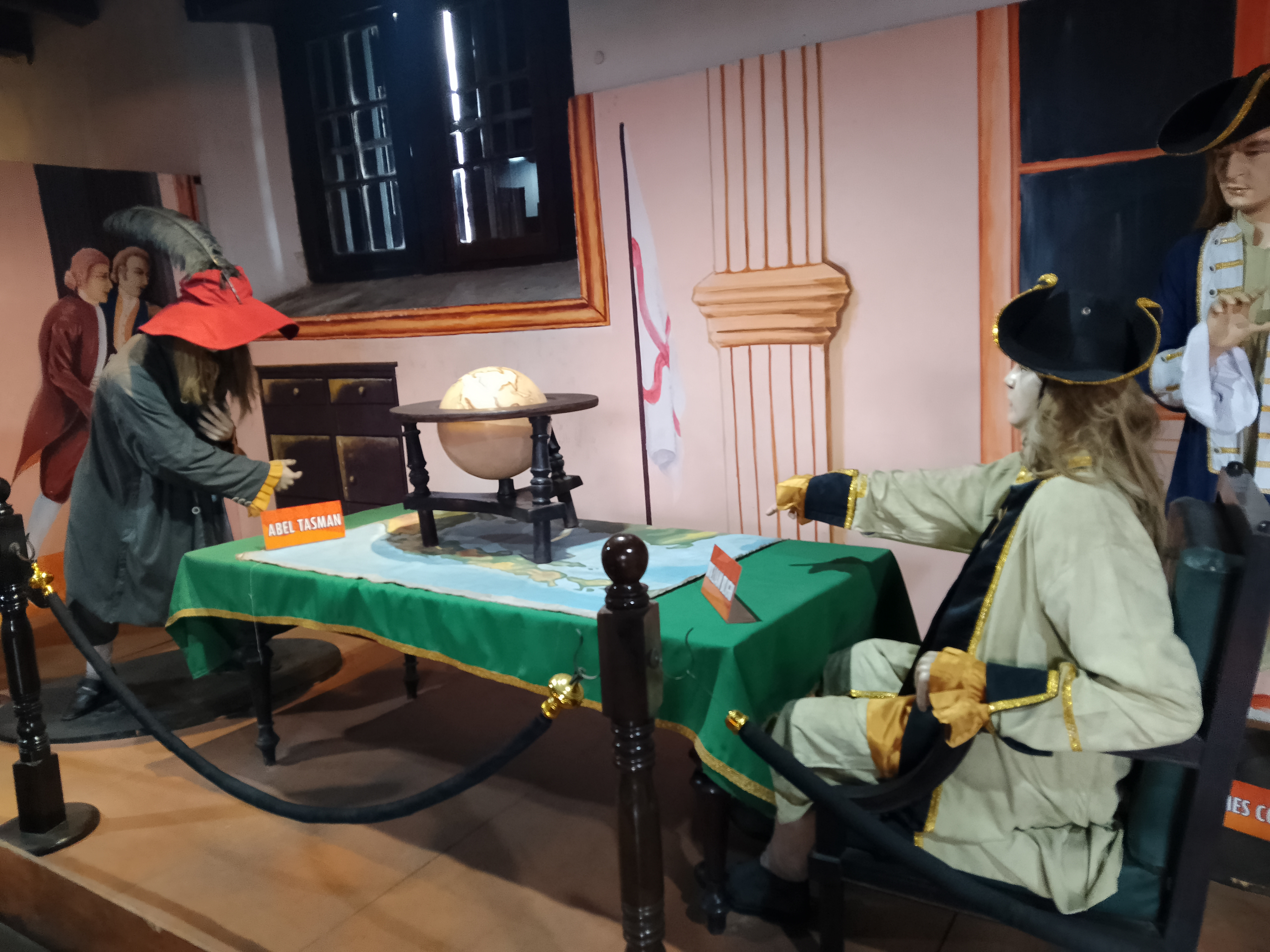
Sea explorer mannequins, depicting Abel Tasman, William Bligh, and James Cook.

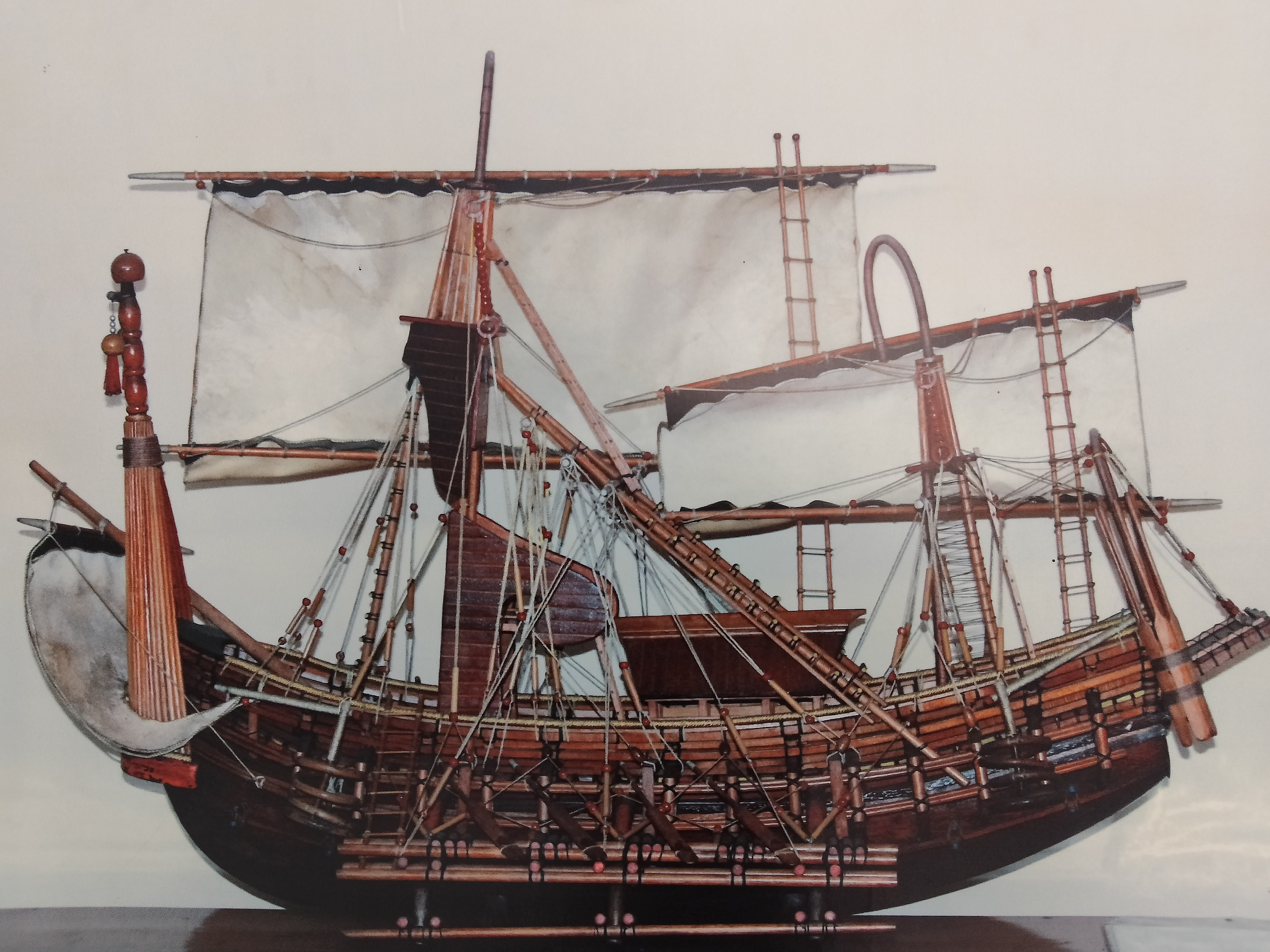
Borobudur ship miniature replica

The museum focuses on the maritime history of Indonesia. Some of the displays are Dutch East Indian ship models and cannons. There is also a scale model of the island Onrust which was the former shipyard for repair of the Dutch East Indian ships.

In the field of traditional sailing, the museum owns various ship models from the Indonesian Archipelago. A model of a Majapahit ship from ancient Java was on display, based on the Borobudur ship depicted on the bas-relief from Borobudur temple. A particularly rare collection is the Pinisi, Lancang, and Gelati traditional vessels. There is also an exhibition of shipbuilding tools as well as descriptions of the maritime traditions and folklore.

In the field of modern shipping, the museum displays various navigational aids, Indonesian Navy maps, information about lighthouses, and old pictures of voyages of the K.P.M. ships.

The museum also shows a display of "Biological Oceanography", showing the biodiversity of the coastal areas of Indonesia.

== 2018 fire ==
One of the original window frames burned in the 2018 fire

On the morning of 16 January 2018, a fire started at the museum and burned most of the building.

== Surrounding area ==
The museum is located in Jakarta Old Town, the historic center of Jakarta. It is within a walkable distance from other cultural heritage displaying the history Batavia e.g. Jakarta History Museum, Wayang Museum, and the Sunda Kelapa Harbor.

== See also ==
- Indonesian Heritage Society which supports this and other museums in Jakarta:
  - National Museum of Indonesia
  - Jakarta History Museum
  - Textile Museum
- Economic history of Indonesia
