= Muara Angke Wildlife Reserve =

Wildlife preserve in Jakarta, Indonesia

Coordinates: 6.1039°S 106.7543°E

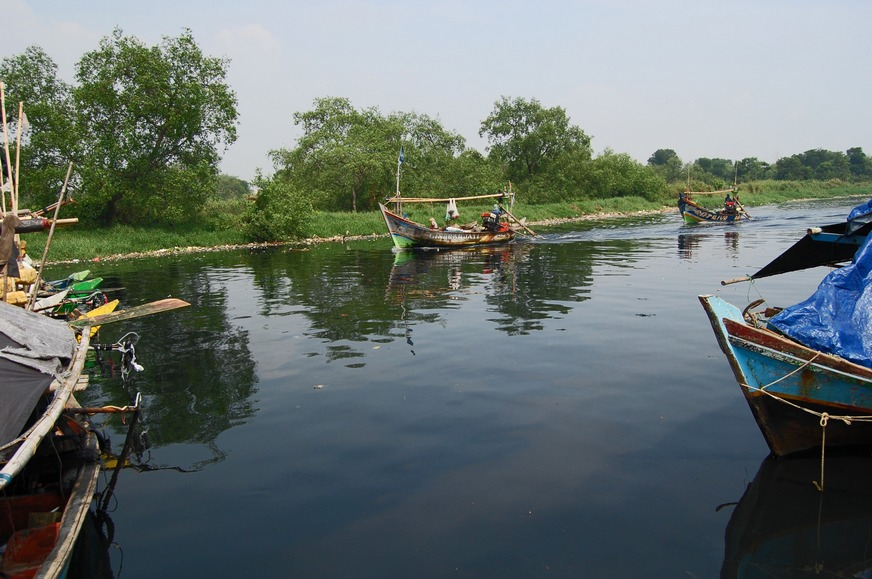
Angke river, Jakarta, Indonesia

Muara Angke mangrove forest and wildlife sanctuary is a protected nature conservation area at Kapuk Muara, Penjaringan along the north coast of Jakarta, Indonesia. Muara Angke Wildlife Sanctuary is located at the end of Muara Karang Raya street, near Mediterranean Gallery shopping complex.

== History ==
Muara Angke Wildlife Sanctuary was protected since the colonial rule of the Dutch Indies on June 17, 1939, covering an area of 15.04 ha. During the 1960s, the conservation area was expanded to 1,344.62 hectares. Later, because of human pressure and environmental destruction within and around the national park, some of the mangrove forest area were destroyed.

On February 28, 1988, the area was declared a Nature Reserve (25.4 ha). In November 1998, the status of this area changed to Wildlife Sanctuary or Suaka Margasatwa (25.02 ha). Muara Angke Wildlife Sanctuary is listed as one of the important bird sanctuary in Java, protecting bird species such as milky stork and the endemic Sunda coucal. Muara Angke Wildlife Sanctuary is currently facing issues such as mangrove cutting, water pollution (especially in Angke River), and settlements development at the edge of the area.

== Vegetation ==
There are about 30 species of plants recorded and 11 of them are true mangrove species in the mangrove forest. The true mangrove species include the bakau (Rhizophora mucronata, R. apiculata), grey mangroves ( Avicennia spp.), red mangrove-apple (Sonneratia caseolaris), and blind-your-eye mangrove (Excoecaria agallocha). Several types of mangrove associates can also be found in this area such as beach almond (Terminalia catappa) and nipa palm (Nypa fruticans). In addition to the above species, there are also several types of trees planted for reforestation. For example tamarind (Tamarindus indica), bintaro (Cerbera manghas), earpod wattle (Acacia auriculiformis), beach calophyllum (Calophyllum inophyllum), large-leafed orange mangrove (Bruguiera gymnorhiza), and sea hibiscus (Hibiscus tiliaceus).

== Fauna ==
The wildlife sanctuary is home to various species of birds and other animals that have been hard to find in other areas of Jakarta. Jakarta Green Monster recorded all 91 species of birds, namely 28 species of water birds and 63 species of forest birds, living in this region. About 17 species of them are protected bird species.

Species of birds that often encountered include Little Cormorant (Microcarbo niger), Javan Pond-heron (Ardeola speciosa), Egrets (Egretta spp.), White-breasted Waterhen (Amaurornis phoenicurus), Common Moorhen (Gallinula chloropus), Red-breasted Parakeet (Psittacula alexandri), Sunda Yellow-vented Bulbul (Pycnonotus goiavier), Sunda Pied Fantail (Rhipidura javanica), and Golden-bellied Gerygone (Gerygone sulphurea). Some of them are distinctive birds of mangrove forests such as Mangrove Jungle-flycatcher (Cyornis rufigastra). In addition, it is also home to Bar-winged Prinia (Prinia familiaris). The sanctuary is also inhabited by several species of endemic birds, which exist only on the island of Java. For example Javan Plover (Anarhynchus javanicus) and Javan Coucal (Centropus nigrorufus), which is one of the most endangered species in the world, with limited distribution in a few places including this sanctuary. Another endangered bird that inhabits this area is Milky Stork (Mycteria cinerea). In Java, this species of stork is known only to breed on Rambut Island located not far from Muara Angke in the Kepulauan Seribu group.

In addition to the species of birds, there are also groups of long-tailed macaques (Macaca fascicularis). They live in groups up to a dozen individuals consisting of several males and females. The main food of the macaques in the mangroves are the young leaves and fruits of Red Mangrove-apple (Sonneratia caseolaris), which gives them an important ecological role in the Muara Angke Wildlife Sanctuary, as they help spread the seeds of forest plants. The seeds that can not be digested will be excreted again along with the feces.

Another species of mammals that can be found in the sanctuary, but rarely seen, is the Small-clawed Otter (Aonyx cinerea) which are small piscivores and are usually nocturnal. It is also home to a variety of reptile species such as Water Monitor (Varanus salvator), Reticulated Python (Malayopython reticulatus), Javan Spitting Cobra (Naja sputatrix), Banded Krait (Bungarus fasciatus), Puff-faced Water Snake (Homalopsis buccata), Mangrove Snake (Boiga dendrophila), Oriental Whip-snake (Ahaetulla prasina) and Southeast-Asian Bockadam (Cerberus schneideri). According to information given by local residents, there are also estuarine crocodiles (Crocodylus porosus) that live within the sanctuary.

== See also ==
- Penjaringan
