= Penjaringan =

District in North Jakarta, Indonesia

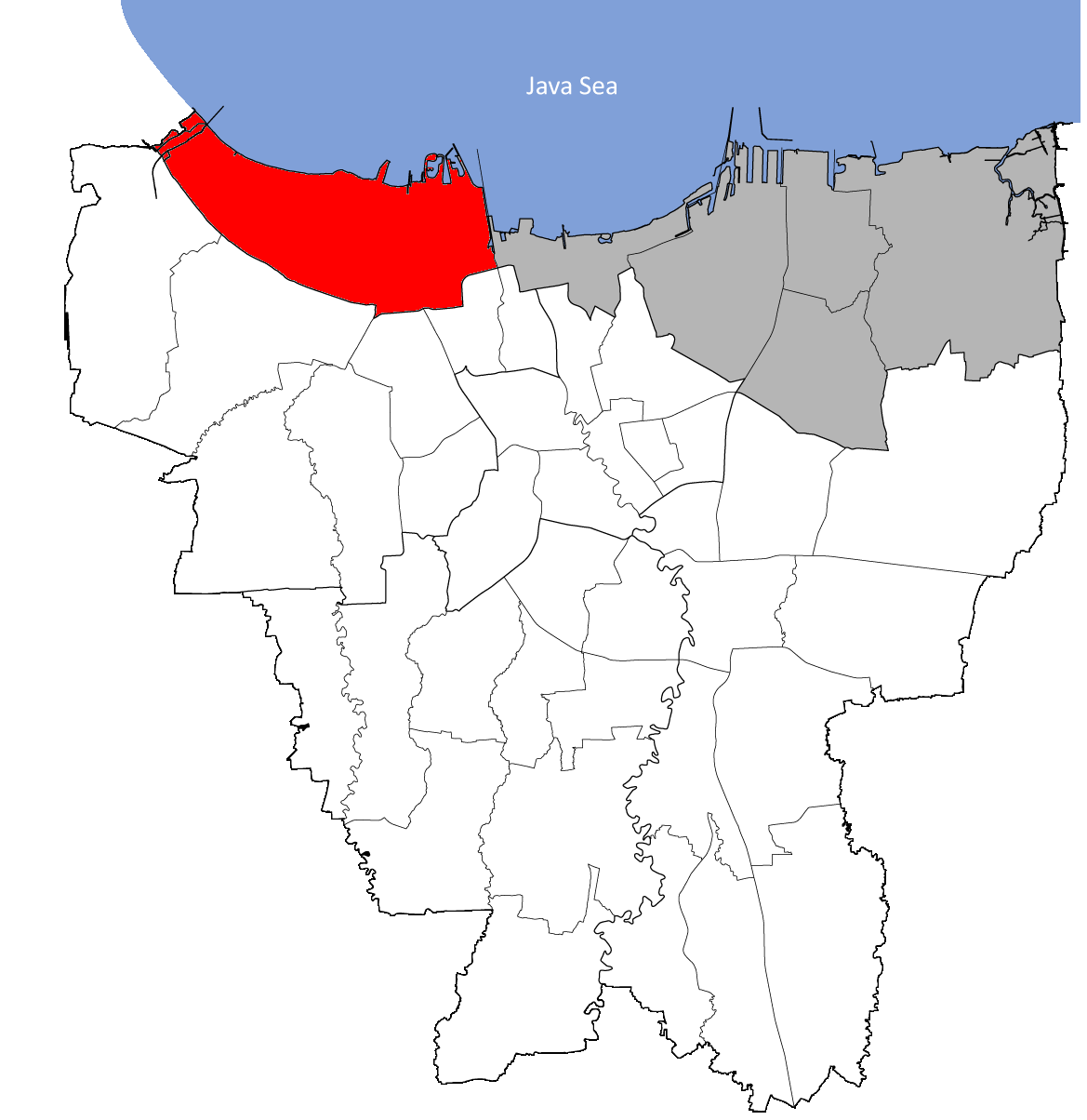
Location of Penjaringan in Jakarta.

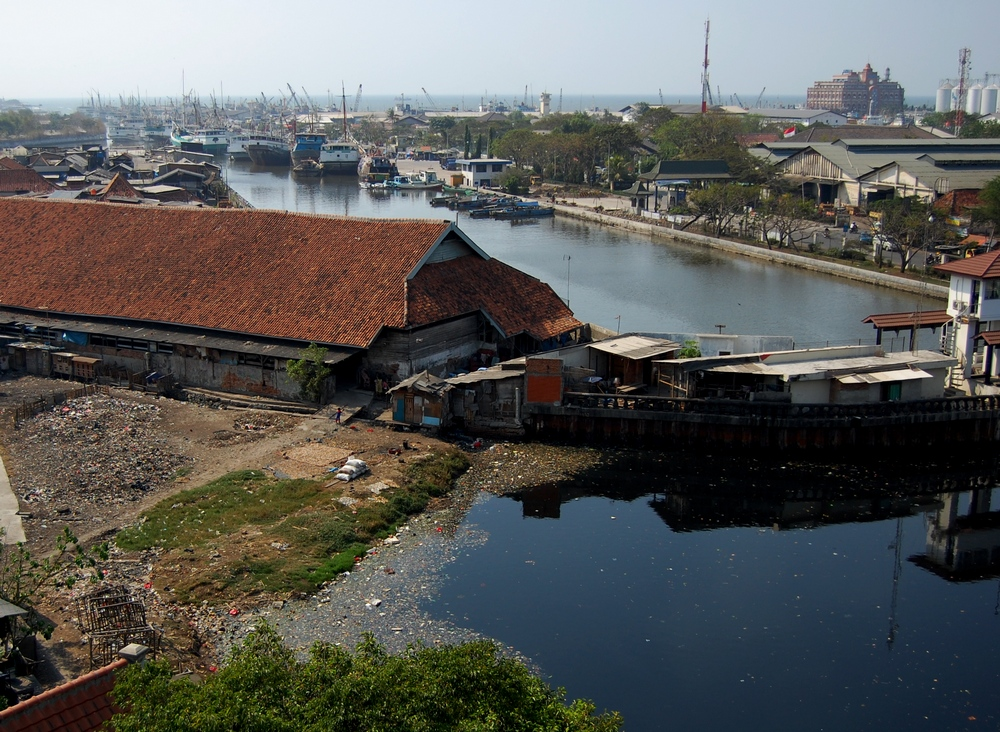
The port of Sunda Kelapa. Penjaringan District is the area to the left of the port. The right side of the port is the Administrative Village of Ancol in Pademangan District. The historic Pasar Ikan ("fish market") is the building on the foreground, built on a restored warehouse of the Dutch East India Company (VOC).

Penjaringan is a district of North Jakarta Administrative City, Indonesia. It is the westernmost district of North Jakarta. Muara Angke Port and the mouth of Sunda Kelapa Port are located within Penjaringan. Penjaringan contains the remnants of the original mangrove forest of Jakarta, some of which are protected by the Muara Angke Wildlife Sanctuary.

Penjaringan District is criss-crossed with water-draining channels, canals, and water reservoirs to protect the land from sea flooding. The Cengkareng Drain, part of Jakarta's flood control system, flows to the sea through this district.

Penjaringan District, especially within Penjaringan Administrative Village, contains several historic Dutch colonial buildings such as the remains of the city wall of Batavia and 17th-century warehouses (now a Maritime Museum).

The boundaries of Penjaringan District are Jakarta Bay to the north, Sunda Kelapa Port to the east, and Kamal Muara Road - Kapuk Raya Road to the south.

== History ==
The coastal area of Penjaringan District is one of the most historic areas in Jakarta. The mouth of the Ciliwung or Liwung River was an important port in West Java. It was used as the main port of the kingdom of Pakuan Pajajaran and Batavia. Around the 16th century, the Muara Angke (a coastal area to the west of old Batavia) was used by the Sultanate of Banten and the Sultanate of Demak as a strategic post to capture the port of Sunda Kelapa from the Portuguese.

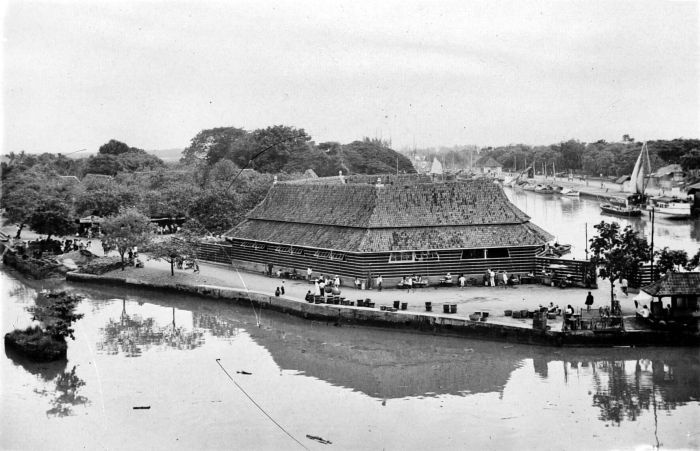
The Pasar Ikan ("Fish Market") in the 1940s

In the 17th century, during the Dutch colonial era, the area that is now Penjaringan Administrative Village was developed into a ship docking area. Warehouses and shipbuilding facilities are built in this area, and some of these 17th-century structures still exist today (such as the now Museum Bahari and Galangan Kapal VOC, a former trade office built in 1628).

In the 18th century, local villages started to appear around the Dutch Batavia. Some of these villages, located within the port of Batavia, are today known as Kampung Luar Batang. Kampung Luar Batang is the location of the Luar Batang Mosque, established in 1739.

During the 1970s, because of insufficient capacity and the lack of facilities, a new fishing port called Pelabuhan Perikanan Samudera Jakarta (PPSJ) (also known as "Jakarta Fishing Port") was created on the west side of Sunda Kelapa Harbor, within Penjaringan District. The feasibility and engineering study was done by Japan International Cooperation Agency from 1973 to 1979. The construction was divided into four phases which began in 1980 and was finished in 2002.

== Mangroves ==
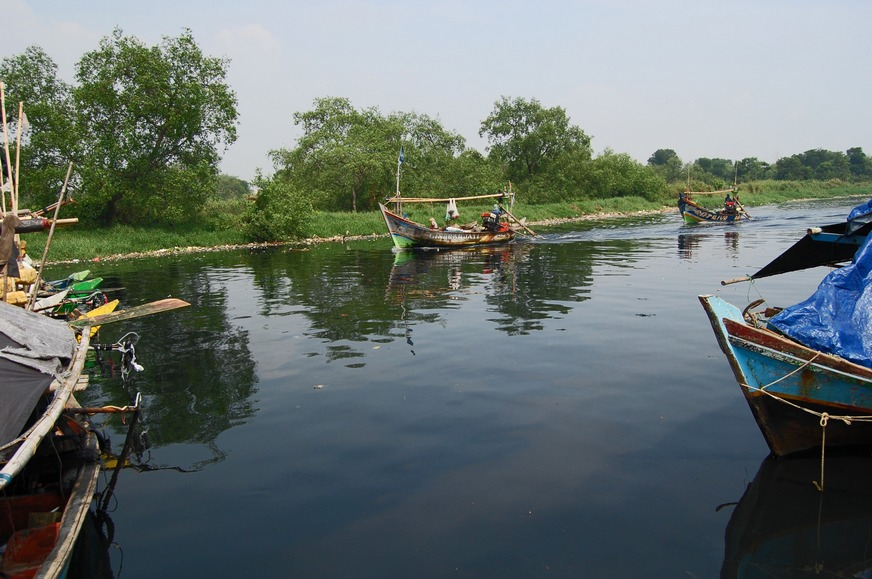
Muara Angke Wildlife Sanctuary contains the original mangrove forest of Jakarta.

Penjaringan contains some of Jakarta's original mangrove forest. Some of these mangrove forests are protected by the Muara Angke Wildlife Sanctuary (located at Kapuk Muara Administrative Village). Another protected mangrove forest in the Penjaringan Subdistrict is the privately owned Angke Kapuk Nature Tourism Park (99.82 ha), which was given by the Jakarta government to PT Murindra Karya Lestari in an attempt to rehabilitate the area back into its original natural state.

== Muara Angke marina ==
On January 5, 2012, the new Muara Angke marina opened to service passenger ships plying routes between the Thousand Islands and the mainland.

== Flooding ==
Being a low plain coastal area, Penjaringan is constantly threatened by flooding from high tide. In Penjaringan Administrative Village itself, a series of plans to reduce flooding has been planned, including settlement relocation, drainage improvement, and the construction of a dike. Research about flooding has been done especially within Penjaringan District.

In 2008, seven dikes were installed within the district of Penjaringan to protect the area from increasing levels of sea tide. The dike consists of Muara Baru dike, Muara Angke dike, Luar Batang dike, Pluit Reservoir, Kapuk Muara dike, Pelindo Harbor dike, and Mutiara Beach dike.

== Kelurahan (Administrative Village) ==
The district of Penjaringan is divided into five kelurahan ("administrative villages"):

- Penjaringan - area code 14440
- Pluit - area code 14450
- Pejagalan - area code 14450
- Kapuk Muara - area code 14460
- Kamal Muara - area code 14470

== List of important places ==
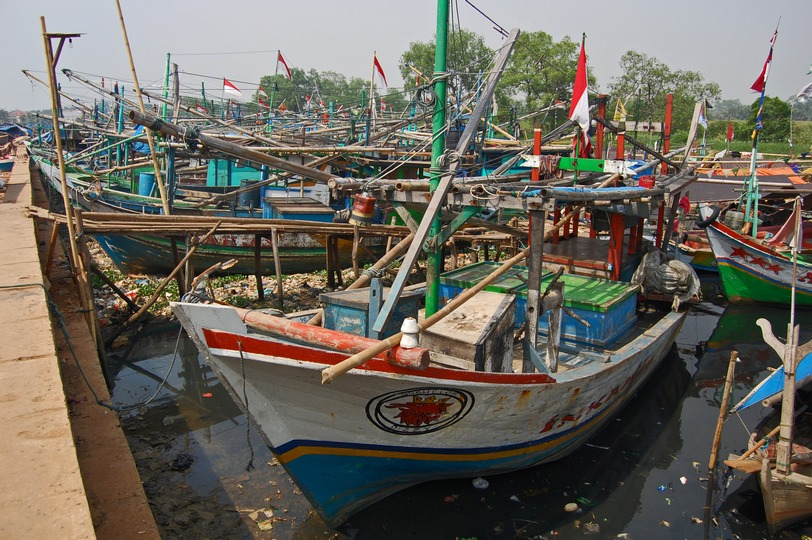
Muara Angke Port

- Luar Batang Mosque (established since 1796)
- Luar Batang Village, existed since the 17th century.
- Maritime Museum (Indonesia)
- Muara Angke Wildlife Sanctuary
- Muara Angke
- Pantai Indah Kapuk housing estates
