= Muara Karang =

Muara Karang is a residential complex in Pluit, North Jakarta. Most of the inhabitants are Chinese Indonesians, who also run many Hokkien restaurants. In recent times, the settlement has attracted Chinese immigrants of many other origins. The area also gained a growing reputation as a casual dining location, due to the numerous new food outlets opened every year, resulting in a highly competitive market. The area are known for its hawker centers.

The area is also home to PLTU Muara Karang, a 1000 MegaWatt steam-powered power plant that provides approximately 60% of Jakarta's energy requirements.

Mega Mall (now called Pluit Village) is currently the main shopping mall with Carrefour as the anchor store. This mall originally had cell phone shops, restaurants, a cinema, furniture shops, and convention halls. Since 2008 it has undergone intensive partial renovation and is slated to reopen in 2009. The mall seems to focus on attracting high-profile branded tenants to it vicinity.

The latest addition to the area is the CBD Pluit, a huge mall, apartment building, department store, office complex and shops. Completed in 2009, it opens as Mall Emporium Pluit.

It is currently unknown whether Pluit Junction has the same owner/developer as CBD Pluit.
