= Sunda Kelapa =

Port of Sunda Kelapa
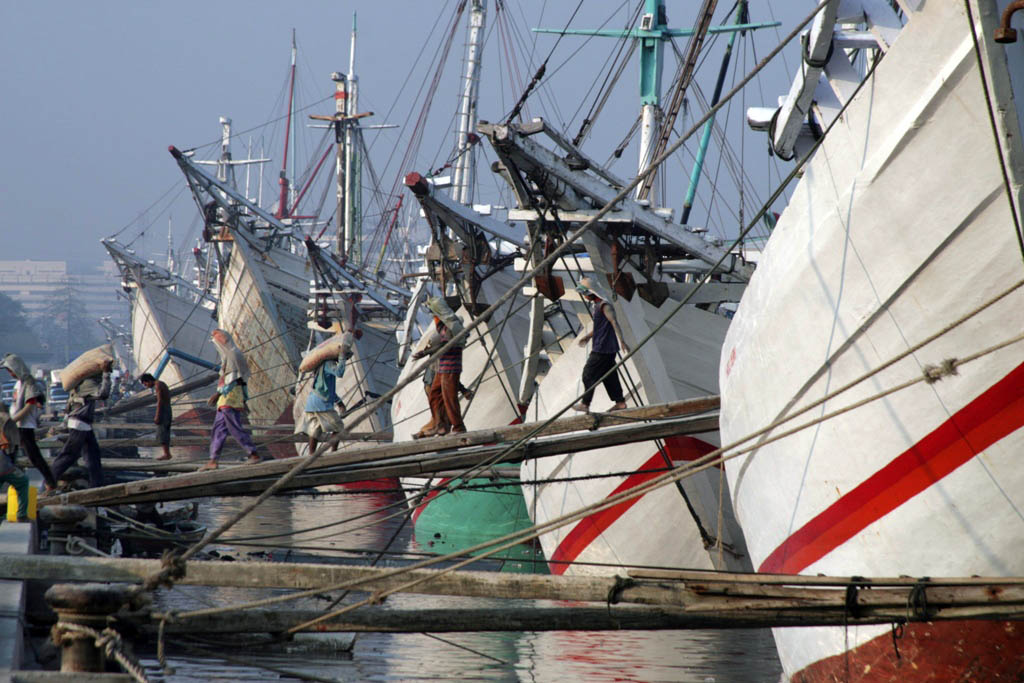
- Pinisi line up at Sunda Kelapa

- Location in Indonesia

Location
- Country: Indonesia
- Location: North Jakarta, Indonesia
- Coordinates: 6.123871°S 106.80861°E

Details
- Operated by: Indonesia Port Corporations
- Type of harbour: Natural seaport
- Land area: 50.8 Ha

Statistics
- Vessel arrivals: Hourly
- Website www.indonesiaport.co.id/read/sunda-kelapa.html

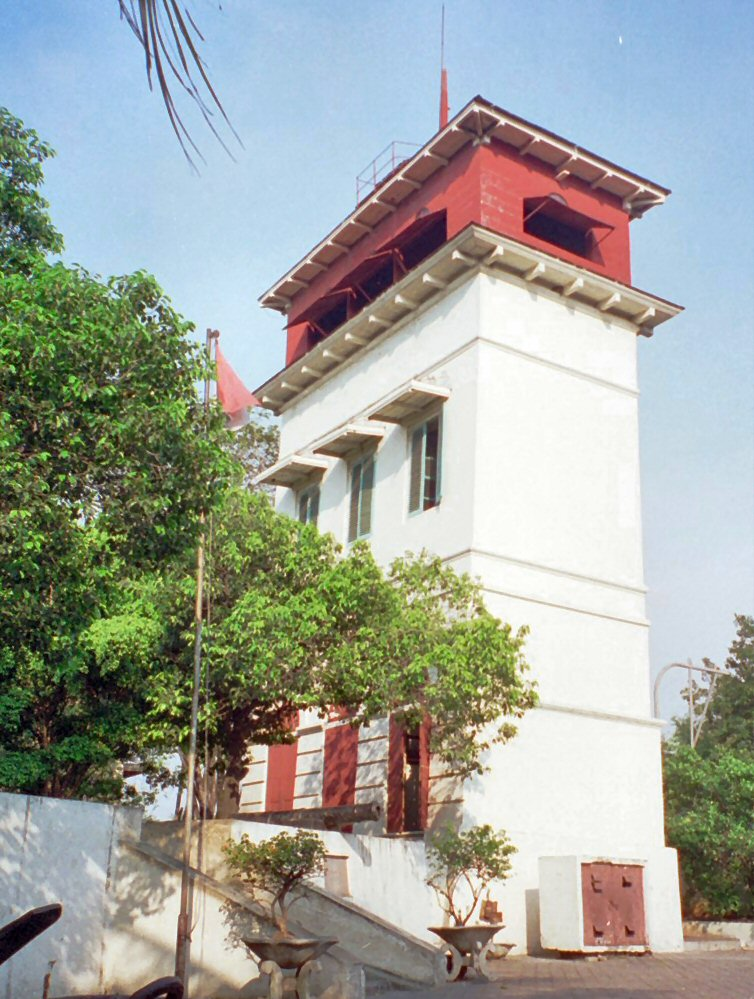
Harbormaster Tower of Sunda Kelapa.

Sunda Kelapa (Sundanese: ᮞᮥᮔ᮪ᮓ ᮊᮜᮕ, Sunda Kalapa) is the old port of Jakarta, located on the estuary of the Ciliwung River. "Sunda Kalapa" (Sundanese: "Coconut of Sunda") is the original name, and it was the main port of the Sunda Kingdom. The port is situated in Penjaringan District, of North Jakarta, Indonesia. Today the old port only accommodates pinisi, a traditional two-masted wooden sailing ship providing inter-island freight service in the archipelago. Although it is now only a minor port, Jakarta has its origins in Sunda Kelapa and it played a significant role in the city's development. The port is currently operated by the state-owned Indonesia Port Corporation (Pelindo).

== History ==
=== Hindu-Buddhist period ===
The Chinese source, Zhu Fan Zhi, written circa 1200, Chou Ju-kua identified the two most powerful and richest kingdoms in the Indonesian archipelago as Sriwijaya and Java (Kediri). According to this source, in the early 13th Century, Sriwijaya still ruled Sumatra, the Malay peninsula, and western Java (Sunda). The source identified the port as strategic and thriving, pepper from Sunda being among the best in quality. The people worked in agriculture and their houses were built on wooden poles (rumah panggung). However, robbers and thieves plagued the country. However it was uncertain which port of Sunda was referred to by Chou Ju-kua, it probably referred to the port of Banten, and not Sunda Kalapa.

From the 13th to 16th century Sunda Kelapa was the main port of the Sunda Kingdom. The port served the capital, Pakuan Pajajaran, located about 60 km inland south, along the Ciliwung river hinterland, now the site of modern Bogor. The port thrived on the international spice trade especially pepper, the main spice produce of the Sunda kingdom. Sunda Kelapa, together with Aceh and Makassar, was one of the few Indonesian ports that maintained ties with Europe.

=== Islamic/Portuguese period ===
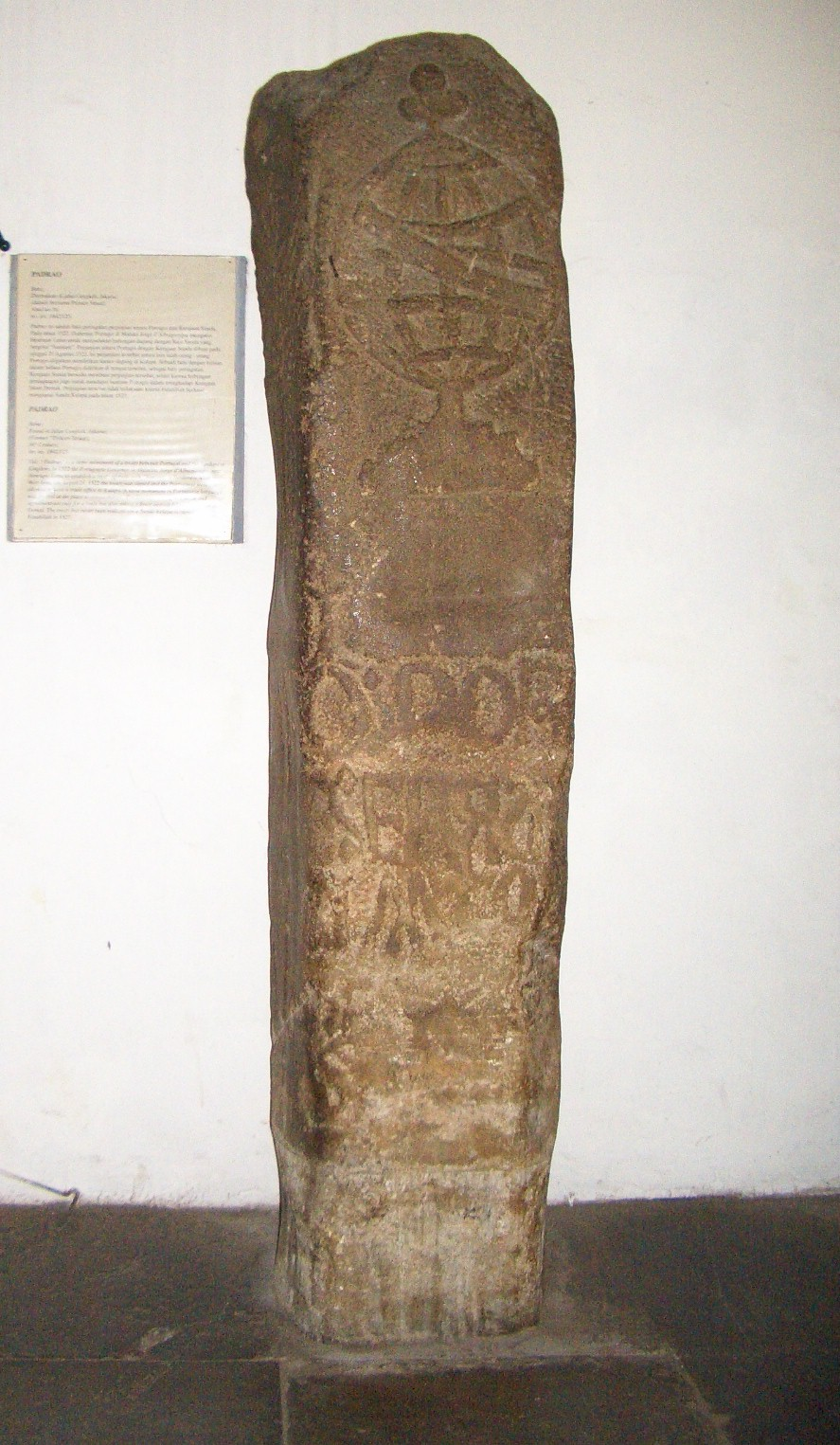
Padrão of Sunda Kalapa (1522), a stone pillar commemorating a treaty between the kingdoms of Portugal and Sunda in Indonesian National Museum, Jakarta.

By 1511, the Portuguese had conquered Malacca and established the earliest European colony in Southeast Asia. According to Suma Oriental, written in 1512–1515, Tomé Pires, a Portuguese explorer reported about the importance of the port of Calapa which corresponds to the port of Sunda Kalapa.

"The port of Calapa is a magnificent port. It is the most important and best of all. This is where the trade is greatest and whither they all sail from Sumatra, and Palembang, Laue, Tamjompura, Malacca, Macassar, Java and Madura and many other places. … This port is two days’ journey from the city of Dayo where the king is always in residence, so that this is the one to be considered the most important."

— Suma Oriental.

In 1522, the Portuguese secured a political and economic agreement with the Hindu Kingdom of Sunda, the authority of the port. In exchange for military assistance against the threat of the rising Islamic Javanese Sultanate of Demak, Prabu Surawisesa, king of Sunda at that time, granted them free access to the pepper trade. Portuguese who were in the service of the sovereign made their homes in Sunda Kelapa and were the first Christians in the lands of present day Indonesia.

However, in 1527, Fatahillah, on behalf of the Demak attacked the Portuguese in Sunda Kelapa and succeeded in conquering the harbour on 22 June 1527, after which Sunda Kelapa was renamed Jayakarta. Later, the port became a part of the Banten Sultanate.

=== VOC/Dutch colonization ===
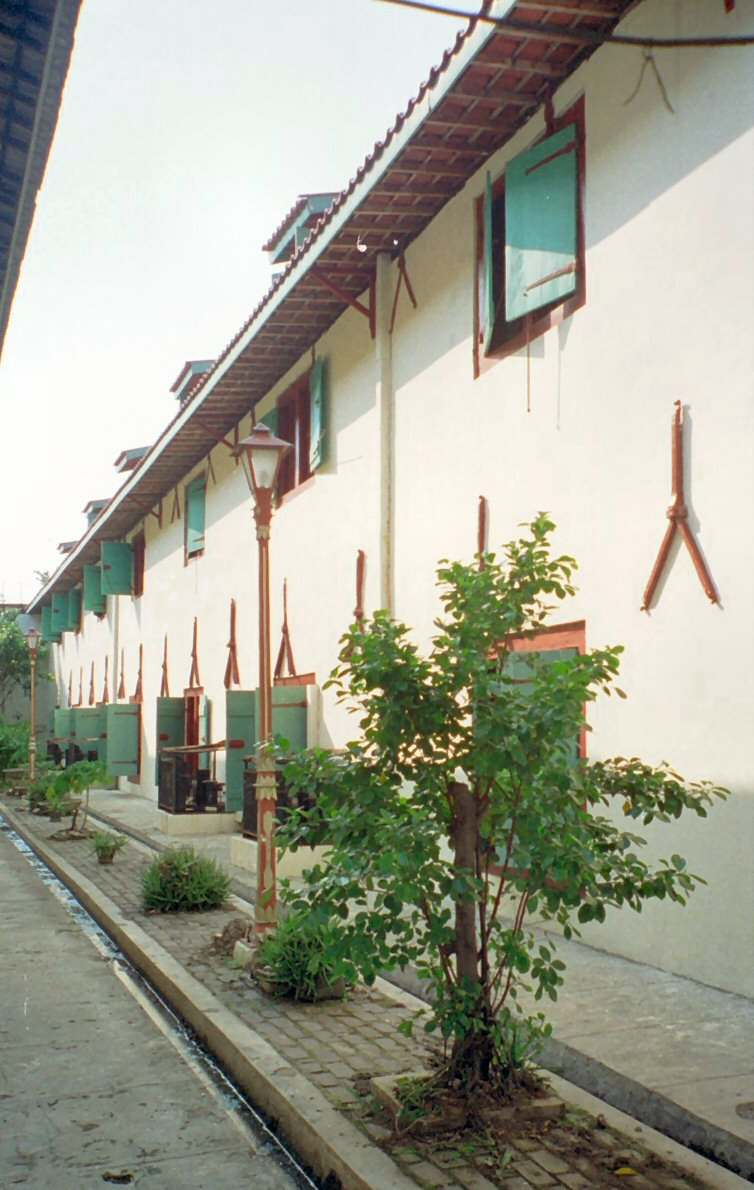
Old warehouses near Sunda Kelapa port, now the Maritime Museum.

In 1619, Jan Pieterszoon Coen, an official working for the Dutch East India Company, seized the port of Jayakarta from the Sultanate of Banten and founded Batavia. During the early period of VOC, the port was mainly used by small ships which were able to sail into the canal and toward the Kali Besar, where goods were loaded and ships were repaired in shipyards i.e. the VOC and the Chinese shipyards located opposite of the Batavia Castle. Larger ships were difficult to enter the port due to its narrow width as well as the shallow water, so these had to anchor out at sea.

By the late 17th-century maintenance of the port already prove to be very difficult, due to sandbanks continuously building up at its mouth and around the area. A fortification called Waterkasteel was built in 1741 to provide protection to the harbour. In the 18th-century, for a short time the VOC made use of slaves and horses to tow dredges along the canal from its eastern bank. The strategy proved to be inefficient and caused loss of life, partly also because of the unsanitary condition and the heat of the tropical climate.

=== Modern colonialism ===
During the 19th-century, the port was known as the Haven Kanaal ("Harbor Canal"). Being the only entrance to Batavia, it earned the nickname "Roads of Batavia" or "Batavia's Roadstead". The port was still a narrow canaled harbor, so large vessels still had to anchor their ships further north. Smaller ships, known as "lighters", were used to transport cargo and passengers to the port. The lighters were described as a very small and very shallow iron steamship, which replaced the earlier large rowing boats. The condition of the Haven Kanaal during the period was deteriorating and performed below the accepted standards, which was similar with the condition of the Old Town at that time. The whole process of carrying passengers and cargo were time-consuming and could be dangerous during stormy weather. Accidents (e.g. collisions between ships with moored junks) were recorded.

In 1885, the Netherlands East Indies government decided to build a new Tanjung Priok port to accommodate the increasing traffic as a result of the opening of the Suez Canal. The new port is located 9 kilometers to the east from the old port.

=== Post-independence ===
After the independence of the Republic of Indonesia, the Batavia old port was renamed back to its original name, Sunda Kelapa, as a tribute to the long history of the port as the cradle of Jakarta.

== See also ==
- Jakarta Old Town

== Works cited ==
- Adolf Heuken SJ dan Grace Pamungkas, 2000, Galangan Kapal Batavia selama tiga ratus tahun. Jakarta:Cipta Loka Caraka/Sunda Kelapa Lestari (in Indonesian)
- Jan Gonda, 1951, Sanskrit in Indonesia. (in English)
- Merrillees, Scott (2001). Batavia in Nineteenth Century Photographs. Singapore: Editions Didier Millet. ISBN 9789813018778.
- Supratikno Rahardjo et al., 1996, Sunda Kelapa sebagai Bandar di Jalur Sutra. Laporan Penelitian. Jakarta: Departemen Pendidikan dan Kebudayaan RI (in Indonesian)
- Thomas B. Ataladjar dan Sudiyono, 1991, 'Sunda Kelapa' di Ensiklopedi Nasional Indonesia. Jakarta: Cipta Adi Pustaka (in Indonesian)
