= North Jakarta =

Administrative city in Jakarta, Indonesia

North Jakarta Jakarta Utara
- Administrative city
- Administrative City of North Jakarta; Kota Administrasi Jakarta Utara

Other transcription(s)
  - Betawi: Jakartè Belah Ilir
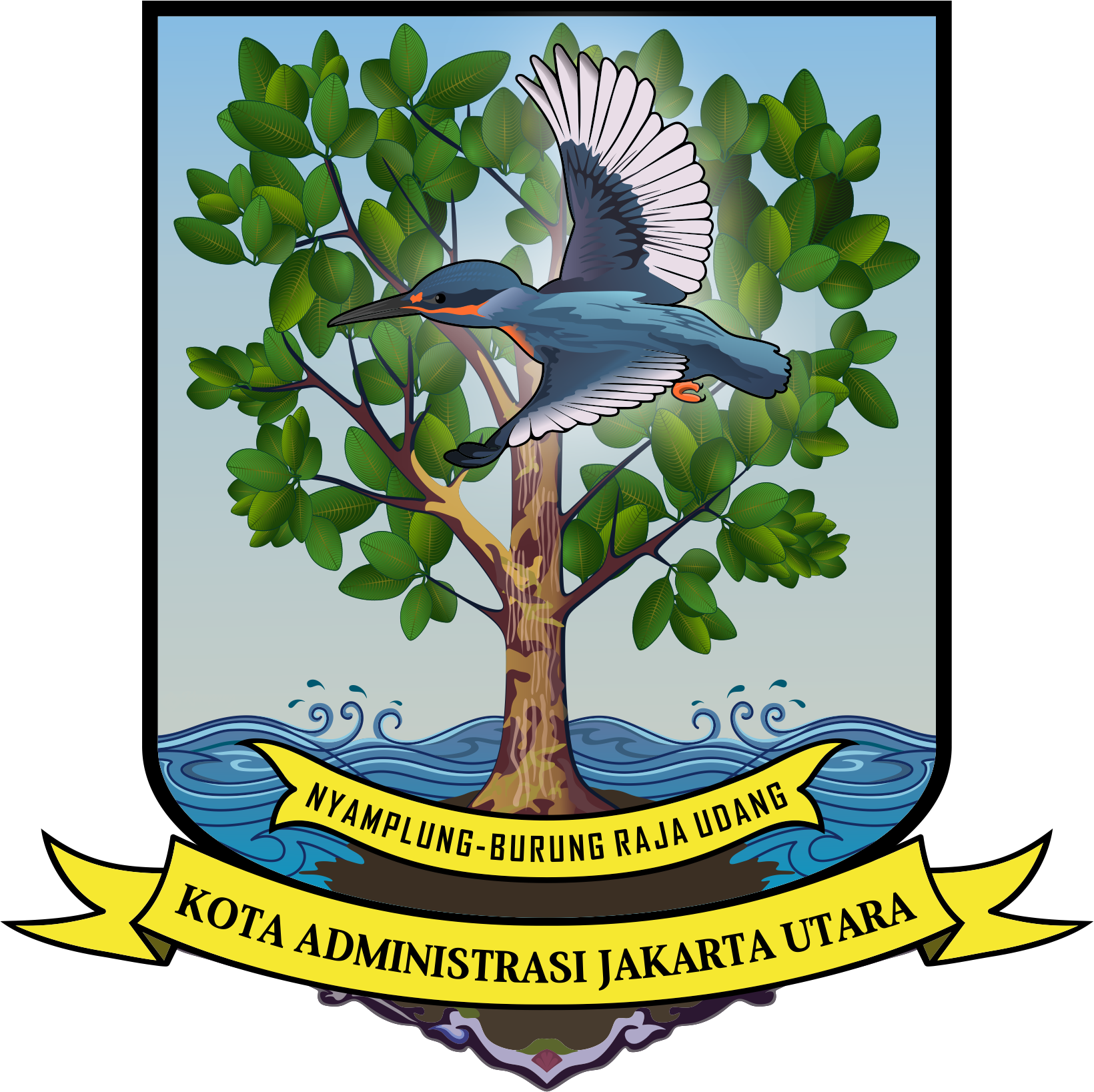
- Seal

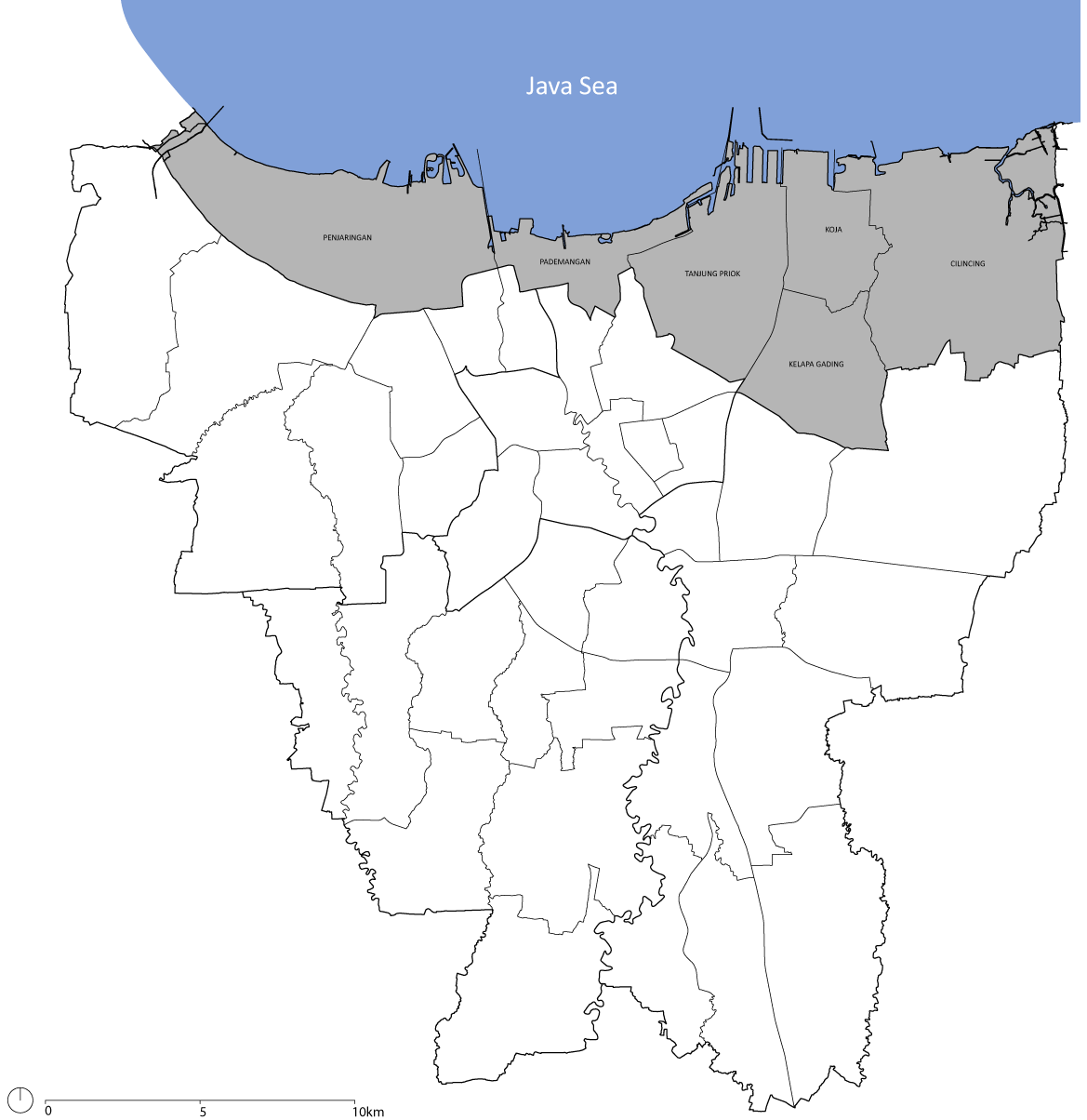
- Coordinates: 6.1864°S 106.8294°E
- Country: Indonesia
- Special Region: Jakarta

Government
  - Mayor: Hendra Hidayat
  - Vice Mayor: Fredy Setiawan

Area
  - Total: 146.66 km^{2} (56.63 sq mi)

Population (mid 2025 estimate)
  - Total: 1,828,806
  - Density: 12,470/km^{2} (32,296/sq mi)
- Time zone: UTC+7 (WIB)
- Vehicle registration: B xxxx Uxx
- Website: utara.jakarta.go.id

North Jakarta (Indonesian: Jakarta Utara; Betawi: Jakarté Bèlilir), abbreviated as Jakut, is one of the five administrative cities (kota administrasi) which form Special Capital Region of Jakarta, Indonesia. North Jakarta is not self-governed and does not have a city council, hence it is not classified as a proper municipality. It contains the entire coastal area within the Jakarta Special Capital Region. North Jakarta, along with South Jakarta is the only two cities in Jakarta to border Banten and West Java. It is also the only city of Jakarta with a coastline and thus not landlocked (along with the Thousand Islands Regency). North Jakarta, an area at the estuary of Ciliwung river was the main port for the kingdom of Tarumanegara, which later grew to become Jakarta. Many historic sites and artefacts of Jakarta can be found in North Jakarta. Both ports of Tanjung Priok and historic Sunda Kelapa are located in the city. The city, which covers an area of 139.99 km^{2}, had 1,645,659 inhabitants at the 2010 census and 1,778,981 at the 2020 census; the official estimate as at mid 2025 was 1,828,806. It has its administrative centre in Tanjung Priok.

North Jakarta contains some of Jakarta's original natural mangrove forests. As the city has developed, some of this mangrove forest was converted into urban areas. However, a reforestation project aimed at planting mangroves within an area of 400 hectares was enacted in 2011 and was scheduled to be finished in 2012. The main goal of the project was to minimize abrasion in the coastal area, especially around the Pantai Indah Kapuk area.

North Jakarta is bounded by Java Sea to the north; Bekasi Regency to the east; West Jakarta, Central Jakarta and East Jakarta to the south; and Tangerang Regency to the west.

== History ==
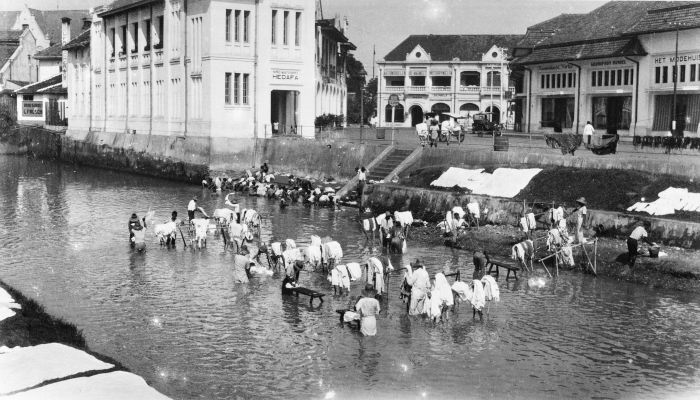
Laundry workers working at Ciliwung river in Pasar Baru, circa between 1915 and 1925.

The present-day city of Jakarta grew from the area which is now North Jakarta. In the 5th century, at the mouth of the Ciliwung-Angke River, the development began with the port city Sundapura (now near Tugu, Jakarta and Bekasi), which was the main port for the Kingdom of Tarumanegara under the leadership of King Mulawarman.

During the 16th century, the city, which covered only the area of what is now North Jakarta, was known as Jayakarta. The system of government in Jayakarta has been amended several times, including changes of rulers, and shifting borders of the administrative area. This area consisted of three forms of government: first, the city government which was controlled directly by the Lord of Jayakarta (the area of which is located in what is now the Port of Angke); second, the state government controlled by leaders inferior to the Lord of Jayakarta (the area of which is located in what is now Pasar Ikan and Kota; and third, the worldwide government (the area of which is located in what is now Tanjung Priok.

At the beginning of the 17th century, the area was controlled by Chinese and other native people who later had to submit to the Dutch East Indies.

In 1854, the Law of Comptabuliteit 1854 divided the Jakarta Bay area into three categories: the Voorsteden (the suburbs), Regentschap Batavia (the Regency of Batavia) and private areas (supervised by the Department of Security - Afdeling I)

The government system changed again in 1905. After the formation of Gemeente Batavia, the area around Jakarta Bay was transformed into Batavia District (kewedanan) which includes Penjaringan, Tanjung Priok, Meester Cornelis and Bekasi. Meanwhile, Tanjung Priok came to be under the control of Haven Directie Koninklijke Paketvaart-Maatschappij.

When Japan entered into the region, the form of the government changed into Shiku (district level), and so North Jakarta was divided into districts such as Shiku Penjaringan, Shiku Tanjung Priok and Shiku Bekasi.

After the formation of the Unitary Republic of Indonesia on 17 August 1945, Jakarta Bay was divided into several administrative regions, namely Kawedanan Penjaringan, Tanjung Priok and Bekasi. These three kawedanan were controlled by the mayorship of Jakarta Raya, which is a part of West Java.

In 1957, after the formation of the Kotapraja Jakarta Raya, the area of Jakarta Bay was transformed into the Kotamadya of Jakarta Utara or "City of North Jakarta".

== Tourism ==
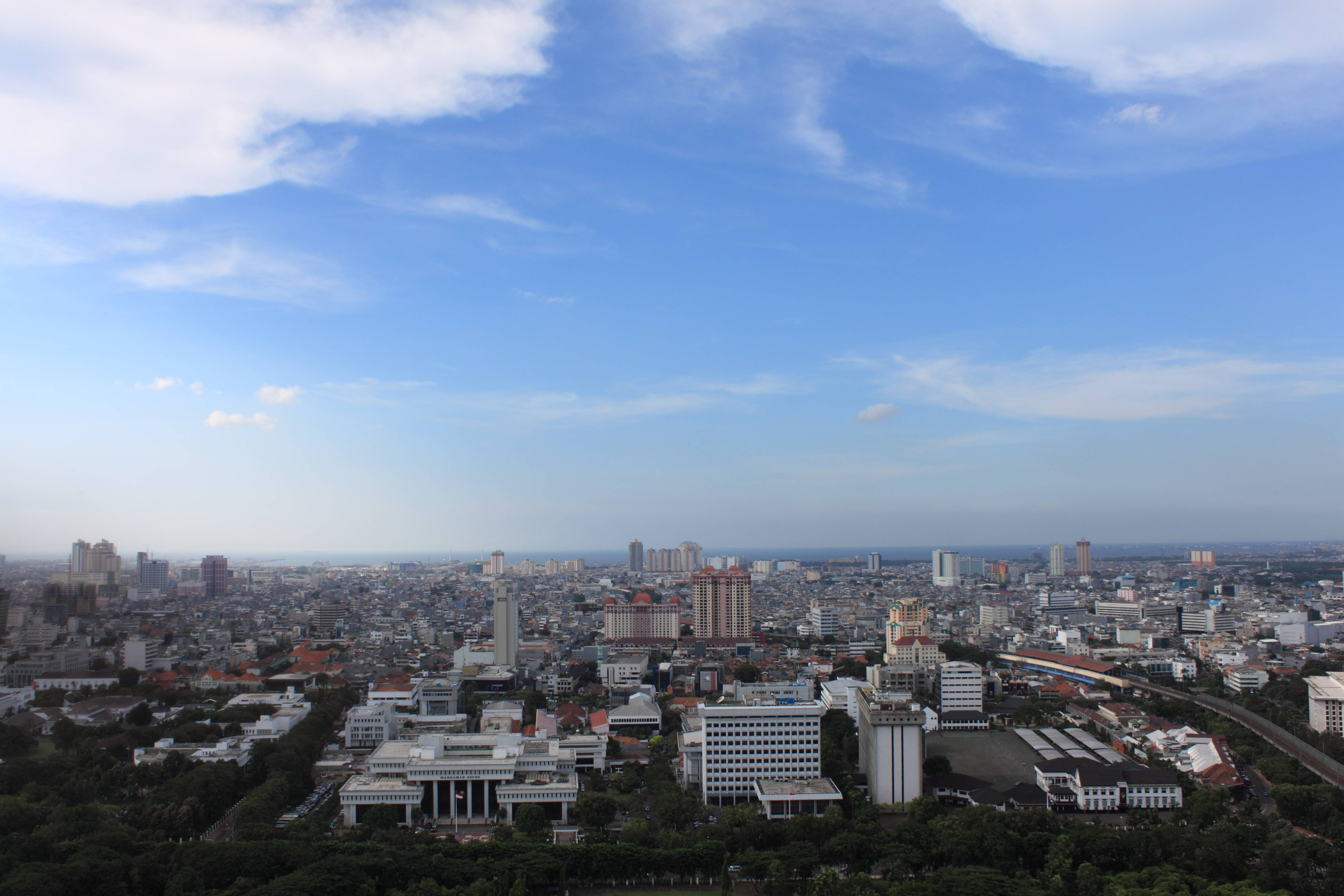
North Jakarta skyline

The government of North Jakarta planned for a rehabilitation of tourism in North Jakarta under the 12 Coastal Tourism Destinations of North Jakarta project (Indonesian: 12 Jalur Destinasi - Wisata Pesisir Jakarta Utara). The 12 chosen destinations are:

- Taman Margasatwa Muara Angke (Muara Angke Wildlife Sanctuary)
- Sentra Perikanan Muara Angke (Muara Angke Fishing Port)
- Pelabuhan Sunda Kelapa (Sunda Kelapa Harbor)
- Masjid Luar Batang (Luar Batang Mosque)
- Mangga Dua shopping district
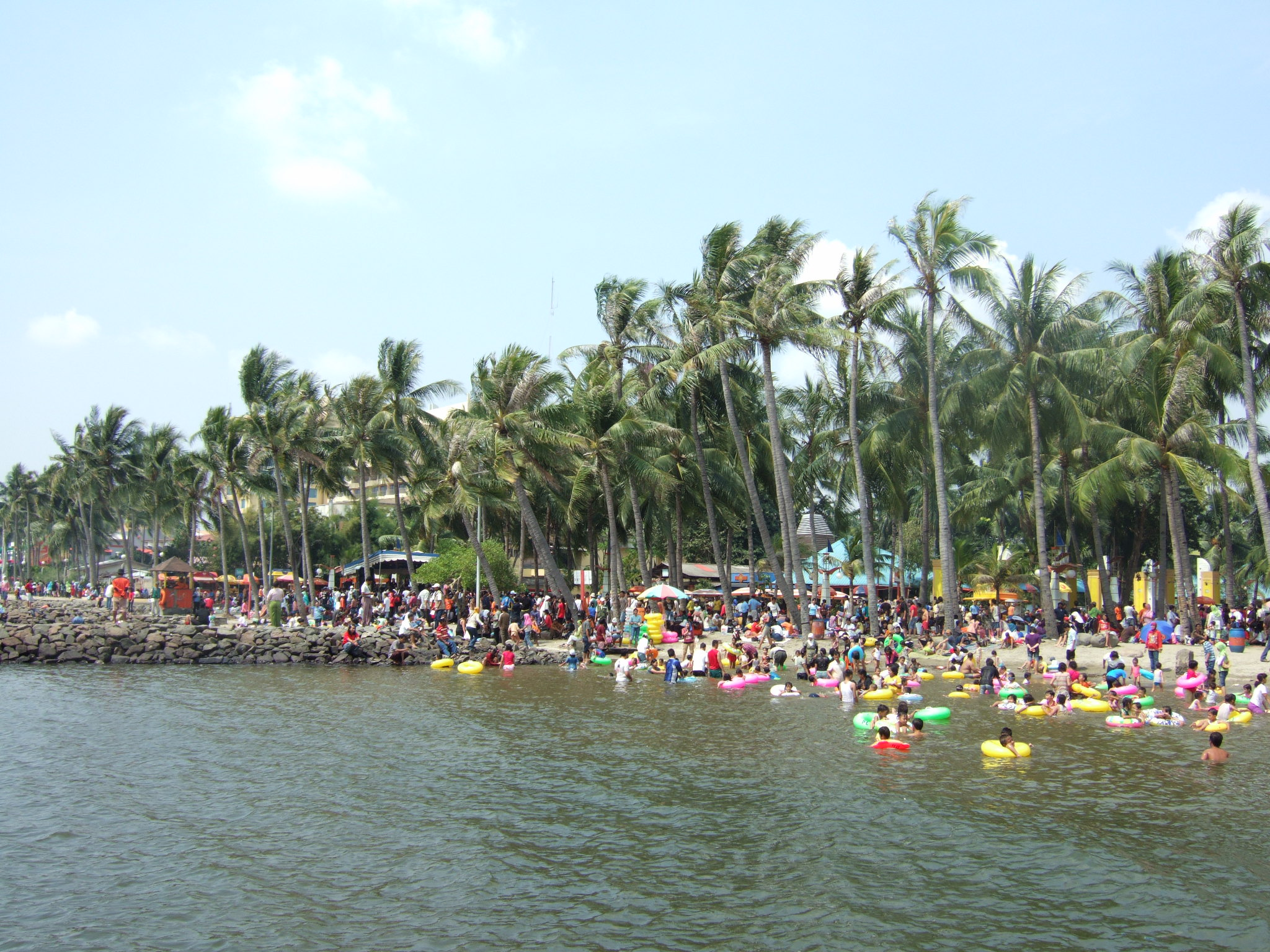
- Festival beach, Ancol
  Taman Impian Jaya Ancol
- Bahtera Jaya
- Stasiun Kereta Api Tanjung Priok (Tanjung Priok Station)
- Jakarta Islamic Center
- Cagar Budaya Rumah Si Pitung dan Masjid Al Alam (Si Pitung's House and Al Alam Mosque)
- Gereja Tugu (Tugu Church)
- Sentra Belanja Kelapa Gading (Kelapa Gading shopping center)

== Administrative districts ==
North Jakarta Administrative City (Kota Administrasi Jakarta Utara) is subdivided into six districts (kecamatan), listed below with their areas and their populations at the 2010 census and 2020 Census, together with the official estimates as at mid 2024. The table also includes the number of administrative villages (kelurahan) in each district, and their names and post codes.

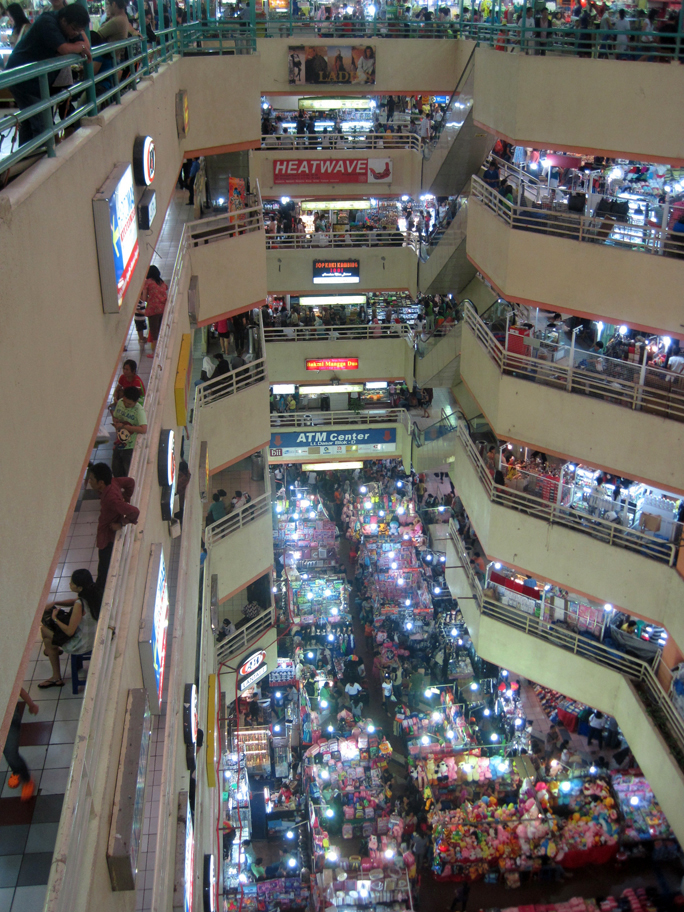
Mangga Dua Mall

Kode Wilayah	Name of District (kecamatan)	Area in km^{2}	Pop'n 2010 census	Pop'n 2020 census	Pop'n mid 2024 estimate	Pop'n density 2024 (/km^{2})	No. of kelurahan	Villages kelurahan (with post codes)
31.72.01	Penjaringan	45.41	306,456	315,613	326,085	7,181	5	Kamal Muara (14470), Kapuk Muara (14460), Pejagalan (14450), Penjaringan (14440), Pluit (14450)
31.72.05	Pademangan	11.92	149,809	162,843	166,587	13,975	3	Ancol (14430), Pademangan Barat (14420), Pademangan Timur (14410)
31.72.02	Tanjung Priok	22.52	375,276	401,806	406,441	18,048	7	Kebon Bawang (14320), Papanggo (14340), Sungai Bambu (14330), Sunter Agung (14350), Sunter Jaya (14360), Tanjung Priok (14310), Warakas (14370)
31.72.03	Koja	12.25	288,091	331,616	342,279	27,941	6	Koja (14210), Lagoa (14270), Rawa Badak Selatan (14230), Rawa Badak Utara (14230), Tugu Selatan (14260), Tugu Utara (14260)
31.72.06	Kelapa Gading	14.87	154,692	138,707	144,911	9,745	3	Kelapa Gading Barat (14240), Kelapa Gading Timur (14240), Pegangsaan Dua (14250)
31.72.04	Cilincing	39.70	371,335	428,316	445,729	11,227	7	Cilincing (14120), Kalibaru (14110), Marunda (14150), Rorotan (14140), Semper Barat (14130), Semper Timur (14130), Sukapura (14140)
	Totals	146.66	1,645,659	1,778,981	1,832,032	12,492	31	
