= List of largest buildings =

Buildings around the world listed by usable space (volume), footprint (area), and floor space (area) comprise single structures that are suitable for continuous human occupancy. There are, however, some exceptions, including factories and warehouses.

Boeing's factory in Everett, Washington, United States is the world's largest building by volume. The AvtoVAZ main assembly building in Tolyatti, Russia is the largest building in total floor area. Due to the incomplete nature of this list, buildings are not ranked. The Aerium near Berlin, Germany is the largest uninterrupted volume in the world.

== Largest usable volume ==
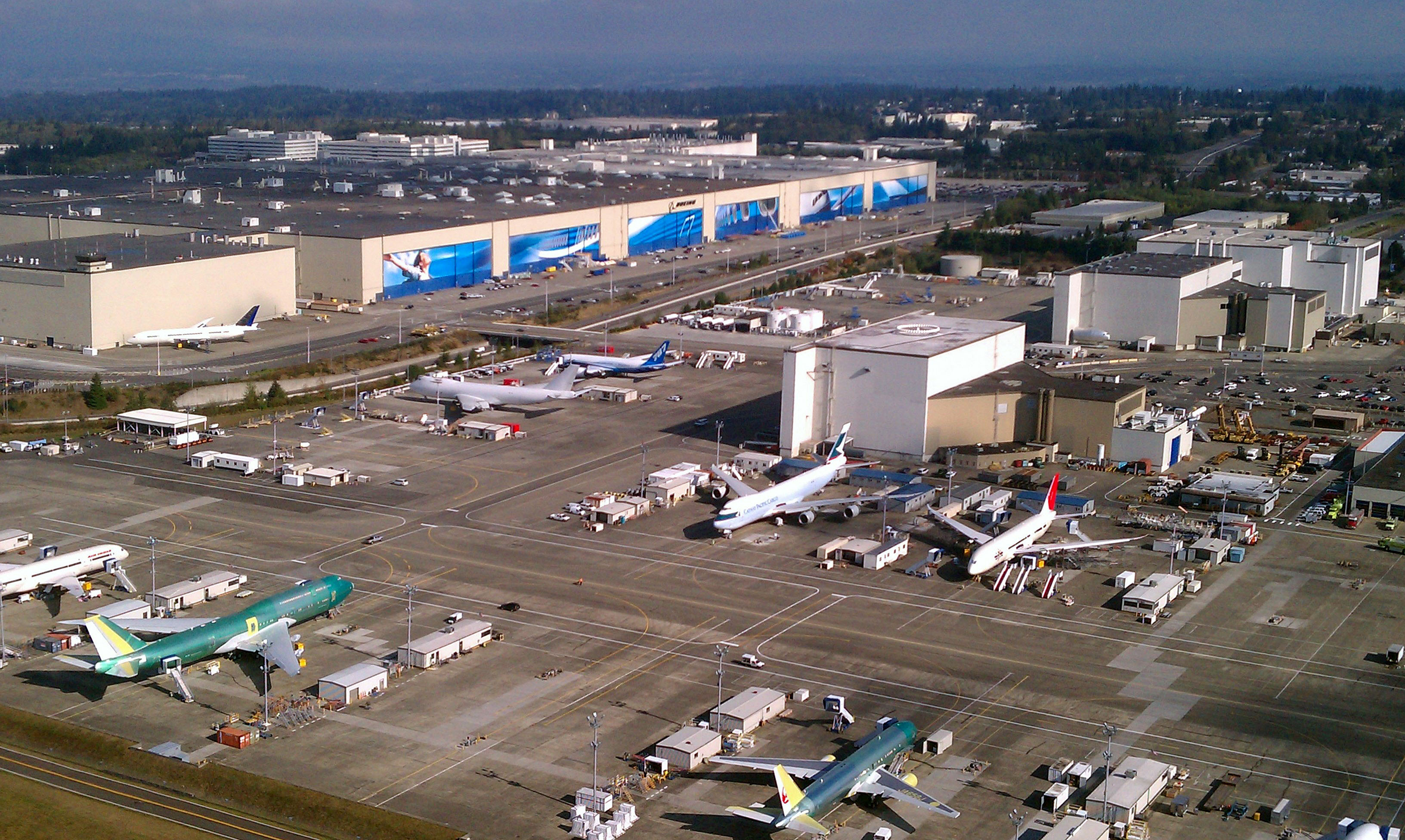
Boeing's Everett factory seen in 2011

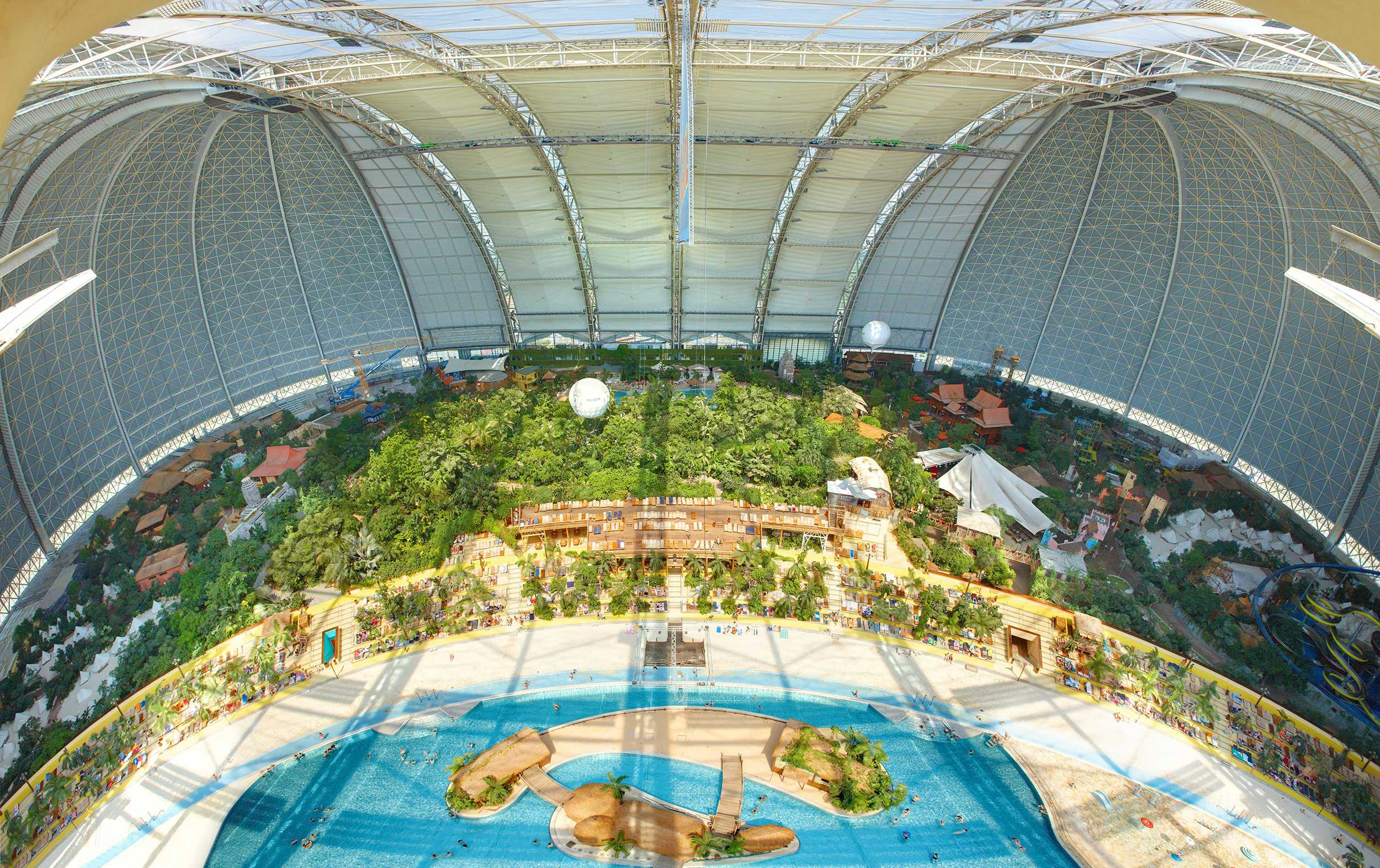
Interior of the 107-metre (351 ft) high airship hangar used as Tropical Islands

Buildings around the world with the largest usable space, sorted by volume, having a volume of at least 1,000,000 m^{3} (35,000,000 ft^{3}):

Name	Country and territory	Built	Place	Floor area	Volume	Description	Ref.
Boeing Everett Factory	United States	1967	Everett, Washington	398,000 m^{2} (4,280,000 sq ft)	13.3 million m^{3} (472 million cu ft)	Boeing's assembly site for a selection of the company's largest aircraft, originally built for construction of the 747.	
Gigafactory Texas	United States	2022	Austin, Texas	929,000 m^{2} (10,000,000 sq ft)	9.57 million m^{3} (338 million cu ft)	Tesla's Gigafactory Giga Texas is 16 city blocks long with a length of 1,310 m (4,300 ft).	
Jean-Luc Lagardère Plant	France	2004	Toulouse-Blagnac	122,500 m^{2} (1,319,000 sq ft)	5.6 million m^{3} (199 million cu ft)	The assembly hall of the Airbus A380, the world's largest airliner.	
Aerium	Germany	1999–2000	Halbe, Brandenburg	70,000 m^{2} (750,000 sq ft)	5.2 million m^{3} (184 million cu ft)	A hangar originally intended for a giant Cargolifter airship, this 107-metre-high (351 ft) building now houses the indoor water park Tropical Islands.	
Meyer Werft Dockhalle 2	Germany		Papenburg, Niedersachsen	63,000 m^{2} (680,000 sq ft)	4.72 million m^{3} (167 million cu ft)	Dry dock for construction of cruise ships.	
Chantiers de l'Atlantique	France	1862	Saint-Nazaire	83,000 m^{2} (890,000 sq ft)	3.7 million m^{3} (131 million ft^{3})	Dry dock for construction of cruise ships.	
Boeing Composite Wing Center	United States	2014–2016	Everett, Washington	111,500 m^{2} (1,200,000 sq ft)	3.7 million m^{3} (131 million ft^{3})	Boeing's assembly site for the production of composite wings for the 777-8 and 777-9.	
NASA Vehicle Assembly Building	United States	1966	Kennedy Space Center, Florida	32,374 m^{2} (348,470 sq ft)	3.66 million m^{3} (130 million cu ft)	Originally built to enable simultaneous assembly and shelter for four Saturn V rockets.	
Inex Sipoo	Finland	2018	Sipoo	270,000 m^{2} (2,900,000 sq ft)	3.5 million m^{3} (130 million ft^{3})	Large grocery distribution center, completed in 2018. Expansion to the distribution center completed in 2020.	
The O2	United Kingdom	1999	London	104,634 m^{2} (1,126,270 sq ft)	2.79 million m^{3} (98.6 million ft^{3})	Originally the Millennium Dome designed for London's millennium celebrations. The world's largest non-industrial building by volume.	
The Palace of Parliament	Romania	1984–1997	Bucharest	365,000 m^{2} (3,930,000 sq ft)	2.55 million m^{3} (90 million cu ft)	Heaviest building in the world; accommodating the two houses of the Parliament of Romania: the Senate and the Chamber of Deputies, along with three museums and an international conference center.	[2-b]
Goodyear Airdock	United States	1929	Akron, Ohio	34 000 m^{2} (364,000 ft^{2})	1.55 million m^{3} (55 million cu ft)	Airship Hangar for the Goodyear Company, at one time the largest building in the world without interior supports.	
Tesco Donabate Distribution Centre	Ireland	2007	Donabate, Fingal	80,194 m^{2} (863,200 sq ft)	1.55 million m^{3} (54.83 million cu ft)	Large dry grocery distribution center near Dublin. Opened in 2007 at a cost of €70 million.	
Cœur Défense	France	2001	Paris	350,000 m^{2} (3,800,000 sq ft)	1.55 million m^{3} (54.83 million cu ft)	Second largest office building in Europe and largest skyscraper by floor area in Europe.	
Target Import Warehouse	United States	2006	Savannah, Georgia	187,664 m^{2} (2,020,000 sq ft)	1.5 million m^{3} (52.97 million cu ft)	Built to distribute imported product to internal Target distribution centers.	
Louvre Palace	France	1190	Paris	244,000 m^{2} (2,630,000 sq ft)	1.5 million m^{3} (52.97 million cu ft)	Largest palace in the world.	
Austal USA (Module Manufacturing Facility)	United States		Mobile, Alabama	68,250 m^{2} (734,600 sq ft)	1.365 million m^{3} (48.204 million cu ft)	The facility is capable of constructing six large aluminium vessels such as the US Navy's Littoral Combat Ship (LCS) and/or Joint High Speed Vessel (JHSV) per year.	
Bielefeld University (main building)	Germany		Bielefeld, North Rhine-Westphalia	138,500 m^{2} (1,491,000 sq ft)	1.2 million m^{3} (42.378 million cu ft)	Modernist university building (built 1970–1976) aspiring to bring all faculties together into one huge building.	
Hanover Fairground (Halls 3–9)	Germany		Hannover, Niedersachsen	114,535 m^{2} (1,232,840 sq ft)	1.15 million m^{3} (40.612 million cu ft)	Largest exhibition ground in the world with 27 halls. Halls 1–2 and 10–27 are in separate adjacent buildings.	
National Exhibition Centre (Halls 1–5)	United Kingdom		Solihull, West Midlands	186,000 m^{2} (2,000,000 sq ft)	1.14 million m^{3} (40.259 million cu ft)	Large exhibition centre southeast of Birmingham. Halls 6–20 are in a separate building.	
2800 Polar Way	United States	2015	Richland, Washington	46,929 m^{2} (505,140 sq ft)	1.029 million m^{3} (36.241 million cu ft)	Built-to-suit by Holliday Fenoglio Fowler (HFF) and constructed by Victory Unlimited Construction for Preferred Freezer Services as the world's largest refrigerated warehouse, 35 m (115 ft), and largest automated freezer.	
Hangar One	United States	1933	Moffett Federal Airfield, Mountain View, California	32,375 m^{2} (348,480 sq ft)	1 million m^{3} (35 million cu ft)	A naval airship hangar opened in 1933 as the hangar for the rigid airship USS Macon (ZRS-5). The hangar measures 345 m (1,132 ft) long, 94 m (308 ft) wide, with a peak of 60 m (200 ft) high.	

== Largest floor area ==
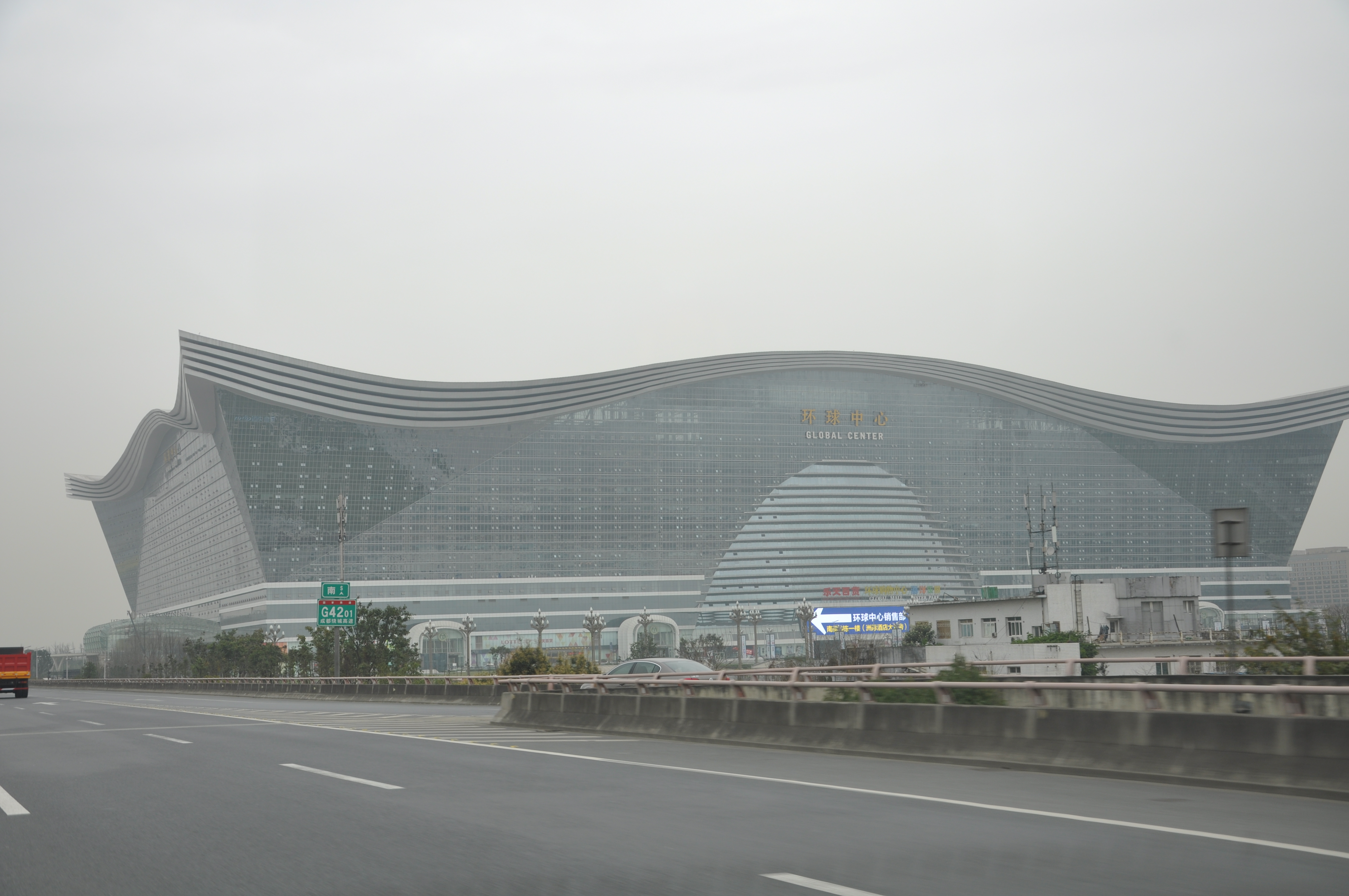
New Century Global Center in Chengdu, Sichuan Province, China

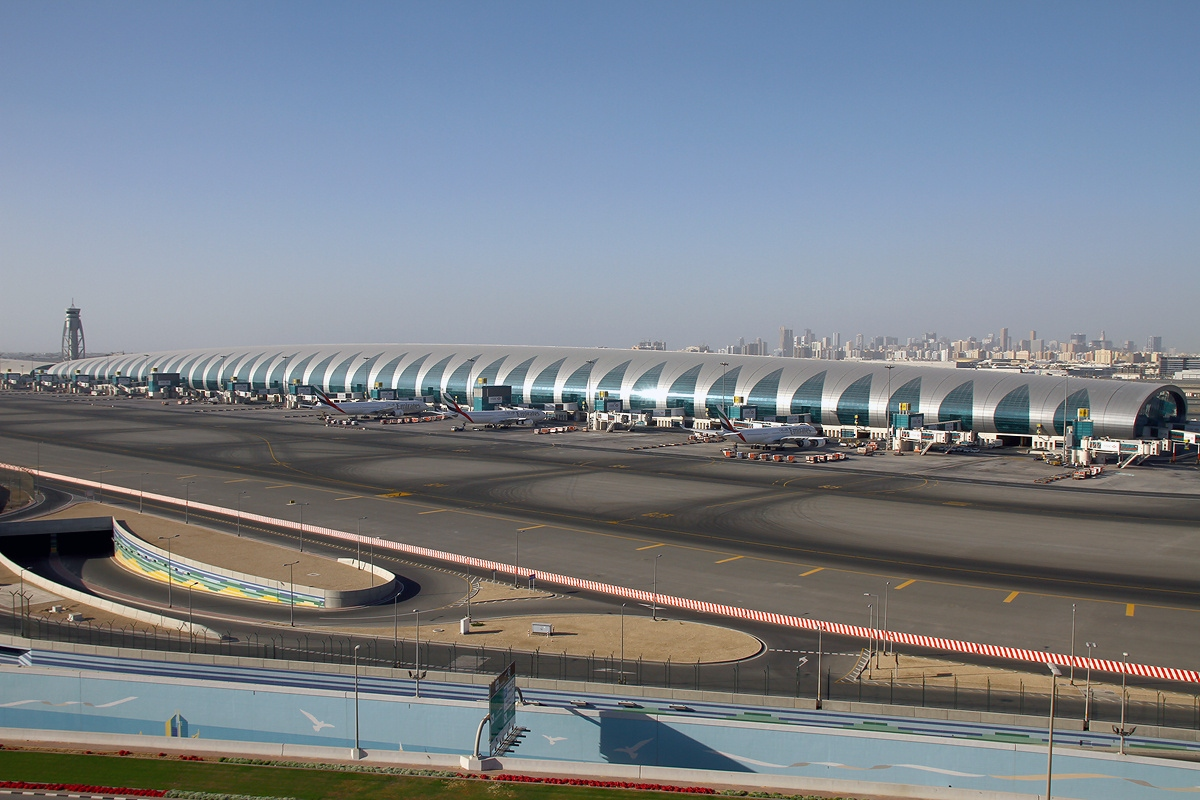
Concourse B, part of Terminal 3 at Dubai International Airport

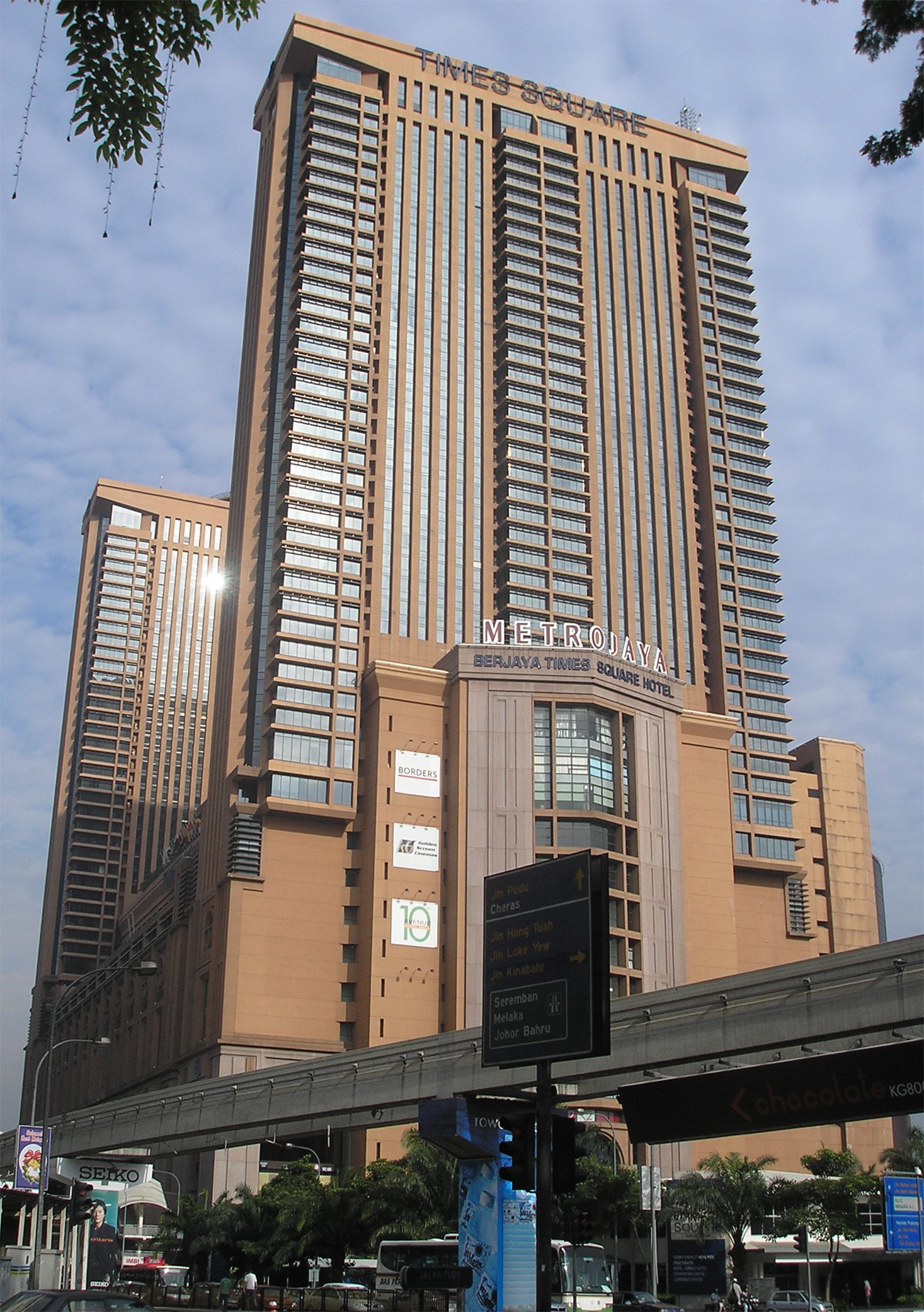
Berjaya Times Square, Kuala Lumpur, Malaysia

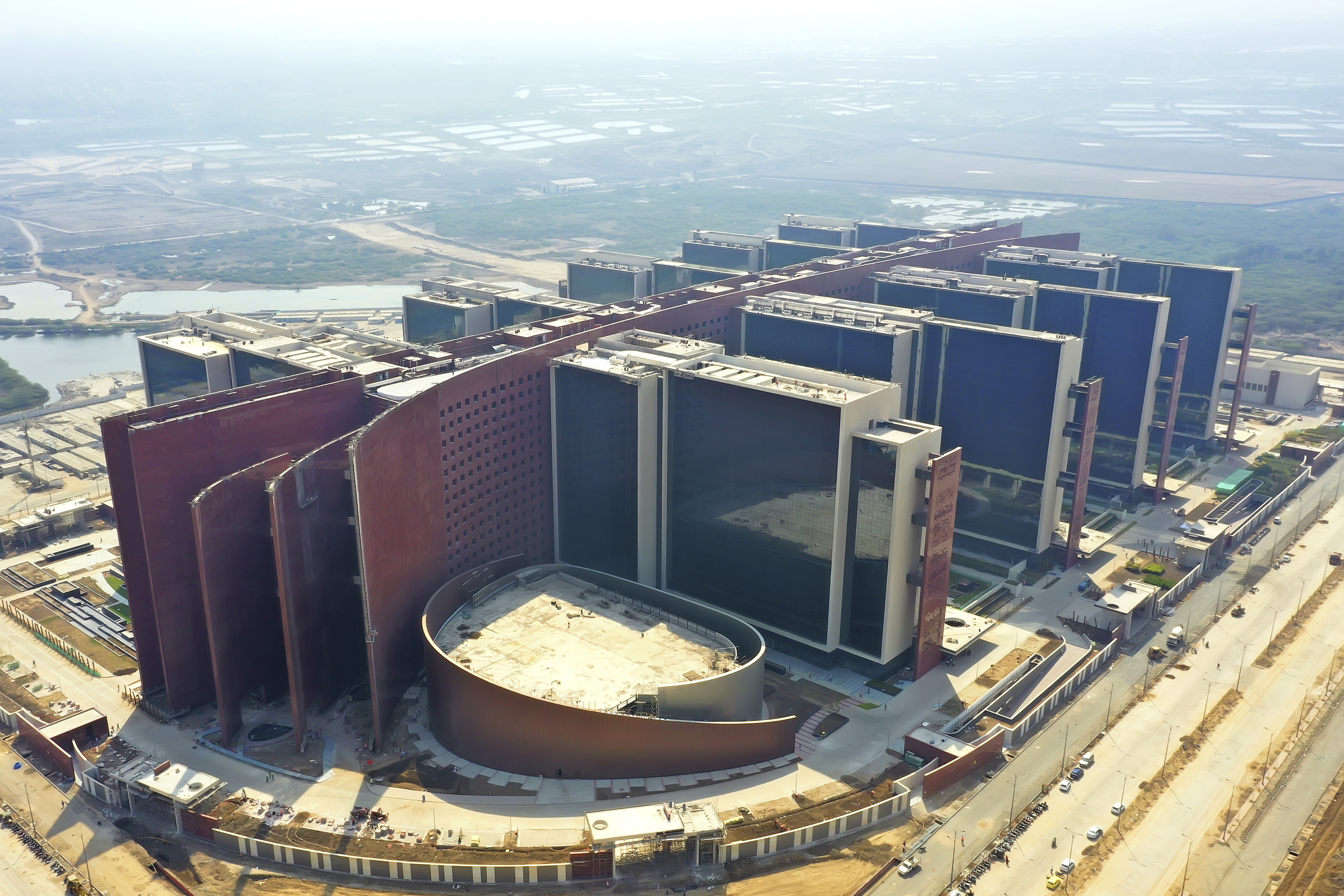
Surat Diamond Bourse in Surat, Gujarat, India

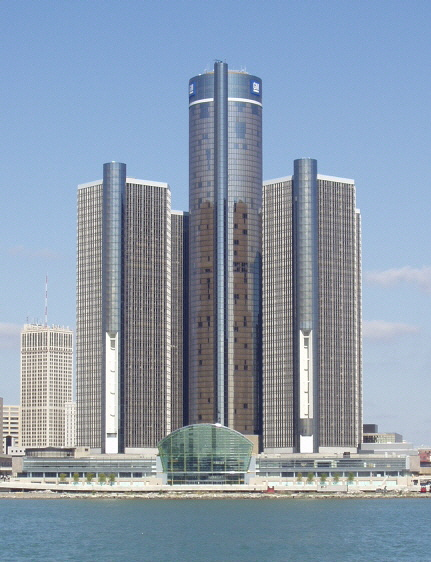
The Renaissance Center in Detroit

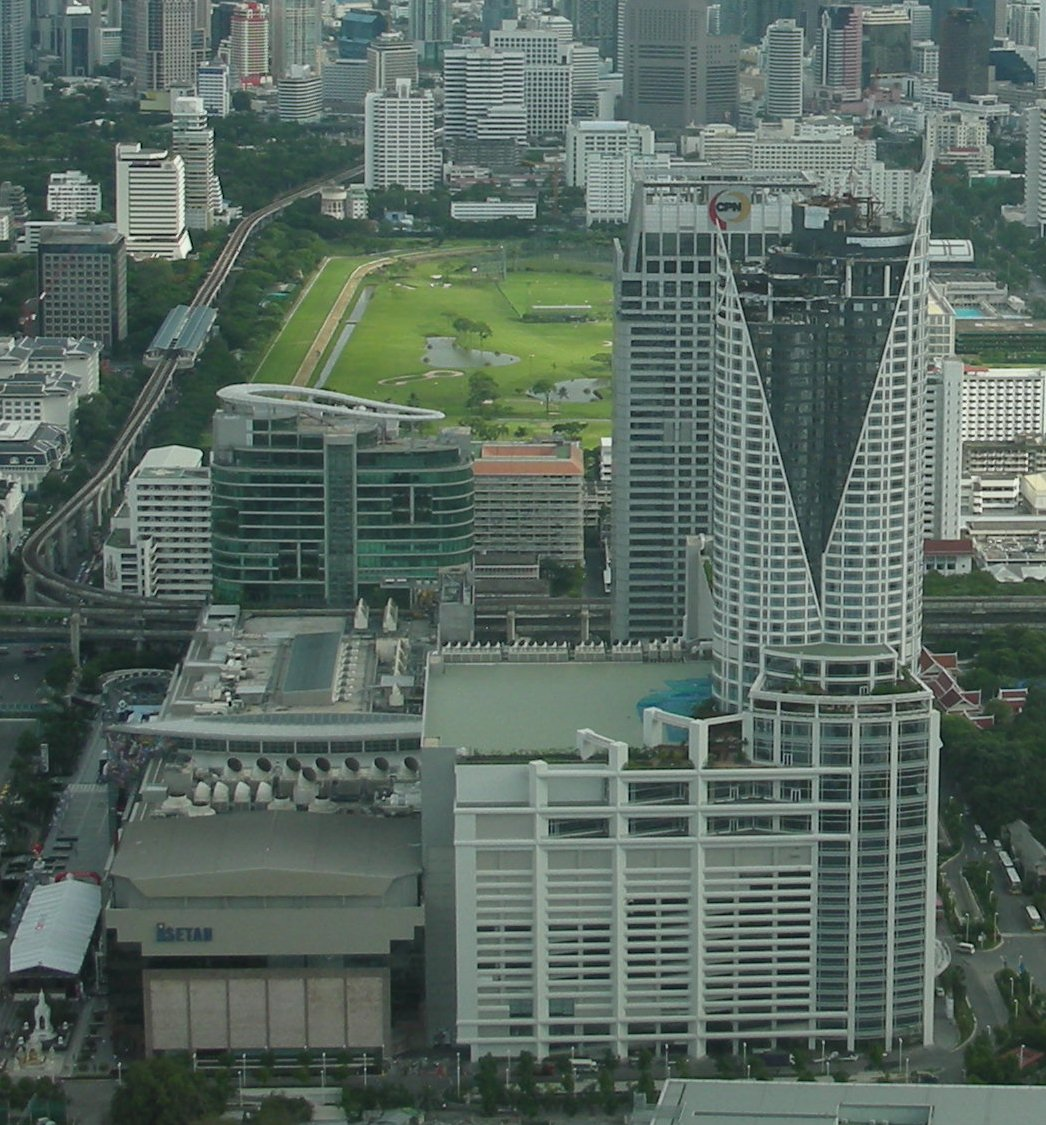
CentralWorld, Bangkok, Thailand

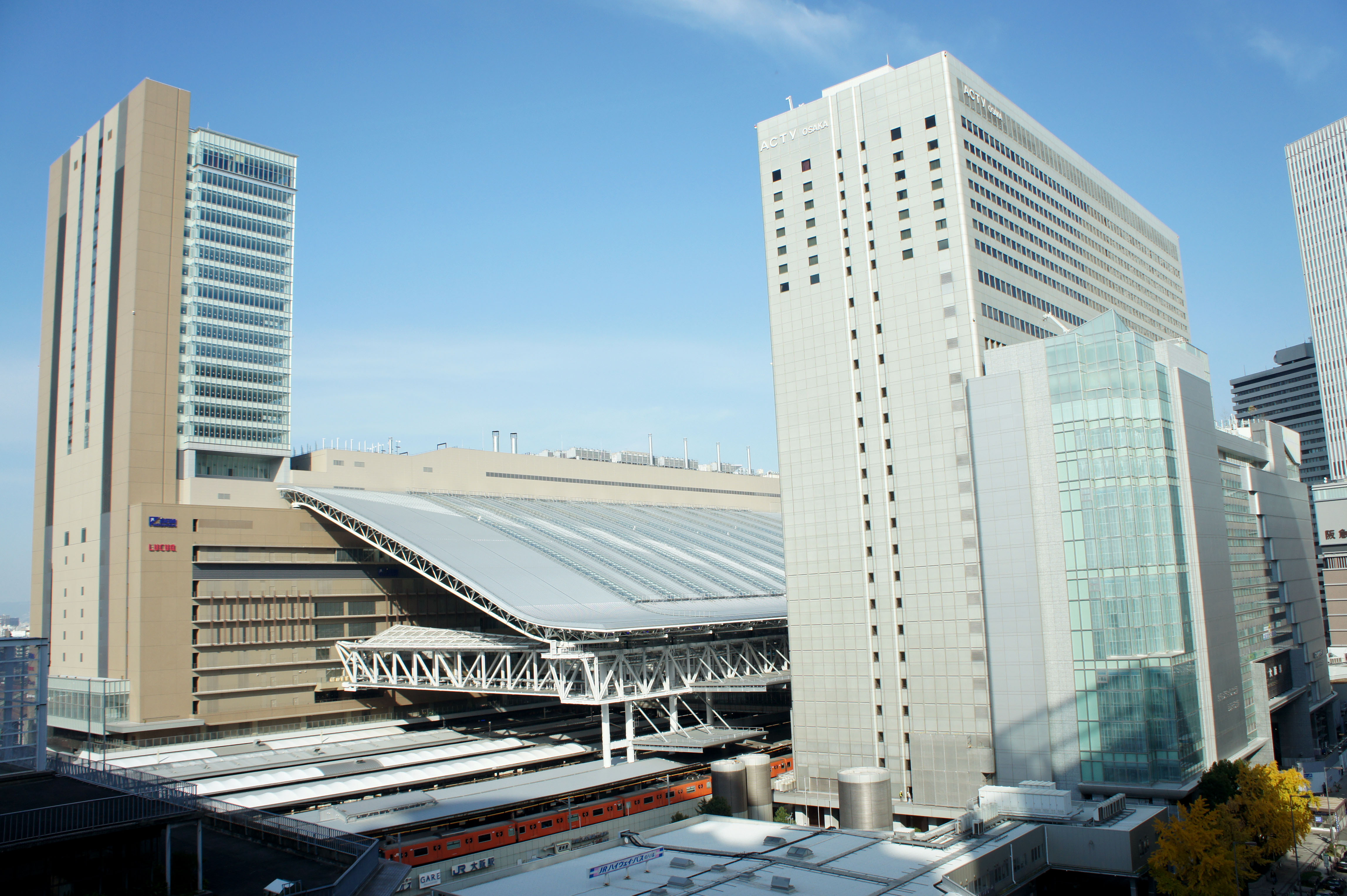
Ōsaka Station City

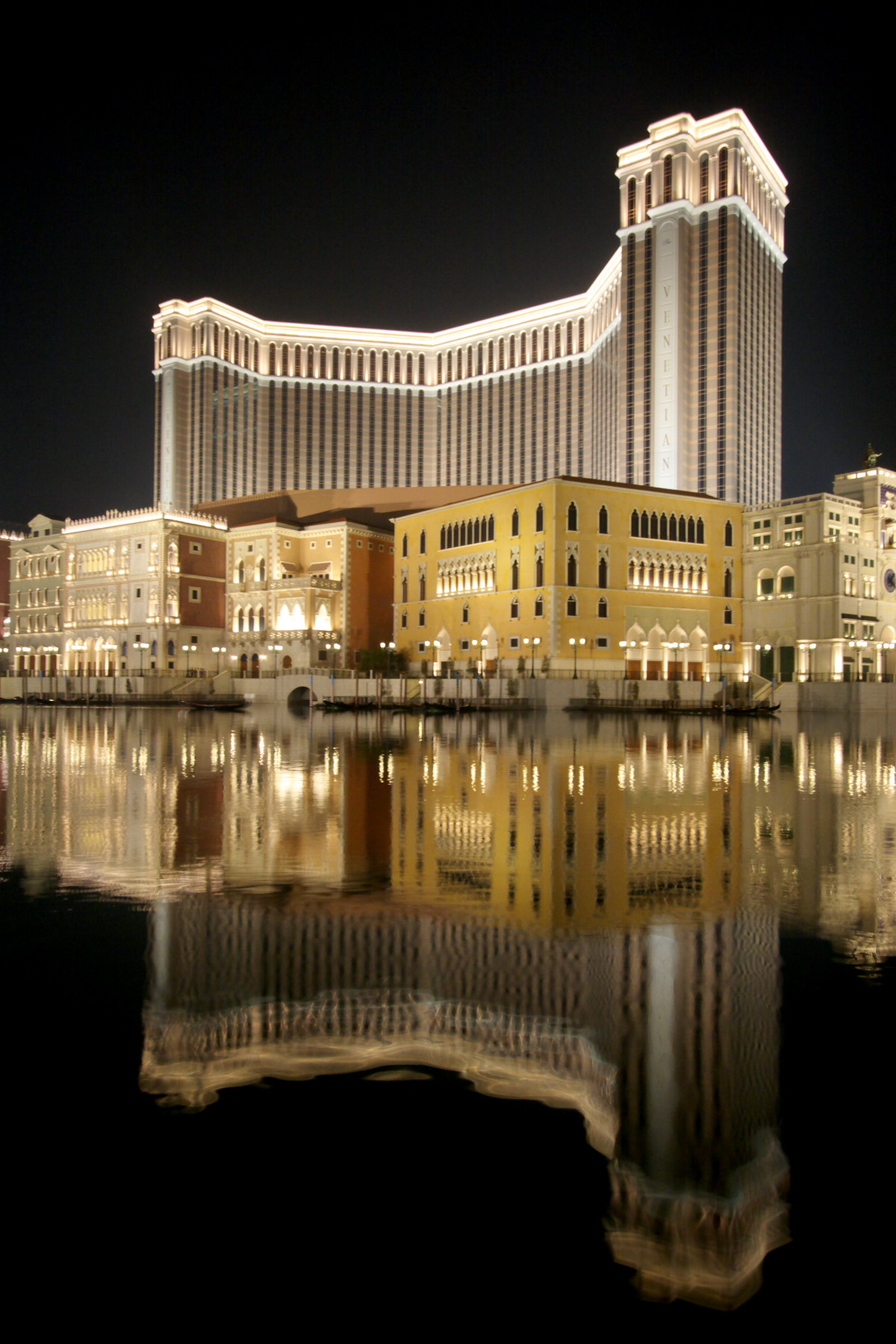
The Venetian Macao

Buildings with the largest usable floor area including multiple stories of at least 400,000 m^{2} (4,300,000 ft^{2}):

Name	Country and territory	Place	Floor area	Notes
AvtoVAZ main assembly building	Russia	Tolyatti	6,000,000 m^{2} (65,000,000 sq ft)	Lada car factory. The floor area shown here is of the main building, not including the attached smaller buildings.
State Strategic Command Center	Egypt	The New Capital	4,700,000 m^{2} (51,000,000 sq ft)	
New Luosiwan International Trade City	China	Kunming	3,140,000 m^{2} (33,798,680 ft^{2})	New Luosiwan International Trade City is a large-scale international trade city integrating production and processing, commercial trade, warehousing and logistics, e-commerce, entertainment and leisure.
New Century Global Center	China	Chengdu	1,760,000 m^{2} (18,900,000 sq ft)	"home to several hotels, a skating rink, a university and a water park with its artificial beach measuring 5,000 square meters"
Dubai International Airport Terminal 3	United Arab Emirates	Dubai	1,713,000 m^{2} (18,440,000 sq ft)	Three buildings connected by tunnels. "The baggage handling system used in the terminal is the biggest in the world and consists of 0.62-mile conveyor belts and 21 screening points."
Abraj Al Bait Endowment	Saudi Arabia	Mecca	1,575,815 m^{2} (16,961,930 sq ft)	"The building is both the tallest and the largest in Saudi Arabia with a height of 1906 feet and a 16.9 million square feet floor area ... " It's the fourth-tallest building and sixth-tallest freestanding structure in the world.
Istanbul Airport Main Terminal	Turkey	Istanbul	1,440,000 m^{2} (15,500,000 sq ft)	Largest airport terminal under a single roof
Iran Mall	Iran	Tehran	> 1,400,000 m^{2} (15,000,000 sq ft)	World's Largest Mall
Frankfurt Airport Terminal 1	Germany	Frankfurt	> 1,300,000 m^{2} (14,000,000 sq ft)	
Chongqing East railway station	China	Chongqing	1,220,000 m^{2} (13,100,000 sq ft)	
Aalsmeer Flower Auction	Netherlands	Aalsmeer	990,000 m^{2} (10,700,000 sq ft)	Largest flower auction building in the world
Beijing Capital International Airport Terminal 3	China	Beijing	986,000 m^{2} (10,610,000 sq ft)	Three buildings connected by train.
The Venetian Macao	Macau	Macau	980,000 m^{2} (10,500,000 sq ft)	2nd largest casino in the world.
Gigafactory Texas	United States	Austin, Texas	929,000 m^{2} (10,000,000 ft^{2})	
The Londoner Macao	Macau	Macau	890,000 m^{2} (9,600,000 sq ft)	
Osaka Station City	Japan	Umeda, Osaka	862,000 m^{2} (9,280,000 sq ft)	
CentralWorld	Thailand	Bangkok	830,000 m^{2} (8,900,000 sq ft)	830 thousand square meter area reflects the total retail floor area
King Abdulaziz International Airport Terminal 1	Saudi Arabia	Jeddah	810,000 m^{2} (8,700,000 sq ft)	
Ciputra World Surabaya	Indonesia	Surabaya	750,000 m^{2} (8,100,000 sq ft)	
Beijing Daxing International Airport Terminal	China	Beijing	700,000 m^{2} (7,500,000 sq ft)	
Berjaya Times Square	Malaysia	Kuala Lumpur	700,000 m^{2} (7,500,000 sq ft)	
Surat Diamond Bourse	India	Surat	660,000 m^{2} (7,100,000 sq ft)	World's largest office building and diamond trading hub.
Perpa Trade Center	Turkey	Istanbul	660,000 m^{2} (7,100,000 ft^{2})	
Central Park Jakarta Complex	Indonesia	Jakarta	655,000 m^{2} (7,050,000 sq ft)	
Guangzhou Baiyun International Airport Terminal 2	China	Guangzhou	658,700 m^{2} (7,090,000 sq ft)	
Kemang Village	Indonesia	Jakarta	650,000 m^{2} (7,000,000 sq ft)	
Gandaria City	Indonesia	Jakarta	650,000 m^{2} (7,000,000 sq ft)	
The Palazzo	United States	Paradise, Nevada	645,581 m^{2} (6,948,980 sq ft)	
Grand Indonesia	Indonesia	Jakarta	640,000 m^{2} (6,900,000 sq ft)	
Shanghai Pudong International Airport Satellite Concourse	China	Shanghai	622,000 m^{2} (6,700,000 sq ft)	World's largest stand-alone satellite terminal
The Pentagon	United States	Arlington County, Virginia	610,000 m^{2} (6,600,000 sq ft)	
K-25	United States	Oak Ridge, Tennessee	609,000 m^{2} (6,560,000 sq ft)	Demolished in 2013.
United States Air Force Plant 4	United States	Fort Worth, Texas	603,870 m^{2} (6,500,000 sq ft)	
Amsterdam Airport Schiphol	Netherlands	Amsterdam	650,000 m^{2} (7,000,000 sq ft)	
Hamad International Airport	Qatar	Doha	600,000 m^{2} (6,500,000 sq ft)	
LAX Rental Car Center	United States	Los Angeles, California	585,289 m^{2} (6,300,000 sq ft)	
Ciputra World 1 Complex	Indonesia	Jakarta	583,000 m^{2} (6,280,000 sq ft)	
Marina Bay Sands	Singapore	Singapore	581,400 m^{2} (6,258,000 sq ft)	
Keangnam Hanoi Landmark Tower	Vietnam	Hanoi	580,000 m^{2} (6,200,000 sq ft)	
Hong Kong International Airport Terminal 1	Hong Kong	Chek Lap Kok	570,000 m^{2} (6,100,000 sq ft)	
Suvarnabhumi Airport	Thailand	Samut Prakan	563,000 m^{2} (6,060,000 sq ft)	
ATL Logistics Centre, Centre B	Hong Kong	New Territories	550,000 m^{2} (5,900,000 sq ft)	
Kunming Changshui International Airport	China	Kunming	548,300 m^{2} (5,902,000 sq ft)	
Barcelona Airport Terminal 1	Spain	Barcelona	544,000 m^{2} (5,860,000 sq ft)	
Warren G. Magnuson Health Sciences Center	United States	Seattle, Washington	533,000 m^{2} (5,740,000 sq ft)	
Chongqing Jiangbei International Airport Terminal 3A	China	Chongqing	530,000 m^{2} (5,700,000 sq ft)	
Tesla Factory	United States	Fremont, California	511,000 m^{2} (5,500,000 sq ft)	
Indira Gandhi International Airport Terminal 3	India	Delhi	502,000 m^{2} (5,400,000 sq ft)	
Siam Paragon	Thailand	Bangkok	500,000 m^{2} (5,400,000 sq ft)	
Incheon International Airport Terminal 1	South Korea	Seoul	496,000 m^{2} (5,340,000 sq ft)	
Chrysler World Headquarters and Technology Center	United States	Auburn Hills, Michigan	490,000 m^{2} (5,300,000 sq ft)	
SAS iTower A	India	Hyderabad	484,586 m^{2} (5,216,040 sq ft)	The largest skyscraper by floor area in the world.
Frankfurt Airport Terminal 2	Germany	Frankfurt	476,000 m^{2} (5,120,000 sq ft)	
Barajas Airport Terminal 4 main building	Spain	Madrid	470,000 m^{2} (5,100,000 sq ft)	
Azabudai Hills Main Tower	Japan	Tokyo	461,395 m^{2} (4,966,410 sq ft)	The second-largest skyscraper by floor area in the world and largest in Japan, and the tallest building in Japan with the height of 325.2 m (1,067 ft).
Ping An Finance Center	China	Shenzhen	459,187 m^{2} (4,942,650 sq ft)	The third-largest skyscraper by floor area in the world, the second tallest building in China, the fourth tallest building in Asia and the fourth tallest building in the world, with the height of 599.1 m (1,966 ft).
Shenzhen Bao'an International Airport Terminal 3	China	Shenzhen	459,000 m^{2} (4,940,000 sq ft)	
Tesla Giga Nevada	United States	Storey County, Nevada	455,000 m^{2} (4.9 million ft^{2})	Also known as Gigafactory 1.
The Exchange 106	Malaysia	Kuala Lumpur	453,853 m^{2} (4,885,230 sq ft)	The largest skyscraper by floor area in Malaysia, the third tallest building in Malaysia, the fourth tallest building in Southeast Asia and the 23rd tallest building in the world, with the height of 445.5 m (1,462 ft).
Chhatrapati Shivaji Maharaj International Airport Terminal 2	India	Mumbai	450,000 m^{2} (4,800,000 sq ft)	
Persian Gulf Complex (Persian: مجتمع خلیج فارس, mojtama'e Khalij-e Fars)	Iran	Shiraz	444,000 m^{2} (4,780,000 sq ft)	
Narita International Airport Terminal 1	Japan	Narita	440,000 m^{2} (4,700,000 sq ft)	
Renaissance Center	United States	Detroit, Michigan	434,000 m^{2} (4,670,000 sq ft)	Five connected towers
Soekarno–Hatta International Airport Terminal 3	Indonesia	Tangerang	422,804 m^{2} (4,551,020 sq ft)	
Mid Valley Megamall	Malaysia	Kuala Lumpur	420,000 m^{2} (4,500,000 sq ft)	
Willis Tower	United States	Chicago, Illinois	418,000 m^{2} (4,500,000 sq ft)	Also known as Sears Tower
USAA McDermott Building	United States	San Antonio, Texas	414,642 m^{2} (4,463,170 sq ft)	
Taipei 101	Taiwan	Taipei	412,500 m^{2} (4,440,000 sq ft)	
Nagoya Station	Japan	Nagoya	410,000 m^{2} (4,400,000 sq ft)	
Boeing Plant	United States	Everett, Washington	398,000 m^{2} (4,280,000 sq ft)	Value is footprint; floor space is greater.

== Special categories ==
Other buildings which are the largest of their type:

Type of building	Name	Country and territory	Place	Floor area	Volume
Department store	Shinsegae Centum City	South Korea	Busan	509,810 m^{2} (5,487,500 sq ft)	
Industrial building	Boeing Everett Factory	United States	Everett, Washington	398,000 m^{2} (4.3 million sq ft)	13.3 million m^{3} (472 million cubic ft)
Legislature building	Sappaya-Sapasathan	Thailand	Bangkok	424,000 m^{2} (4,560,000 sq ft)	
Office building	Surat Diamond Bourse	India	Surat	660,000 m^{2} (7,100,000 sq ft)	
Skyscraper	SAS iTower A	India	Hyderabad	484,586 m^{2} (5,216,040 sq ft)	
Bus depot	Millennium Park Bus Depot	India	Delhi	305,265 m^{2} (3.6 million sq ft)	
Courthouse	Istanbul Justice Palace	Turkey	Istanbul	300,000 m^{2} (3.0 million sq ft)	
Bus terminal	Tel Aviv Central Bus Station	Israel	Tel Aviv	230,000 m2 (2.5 million sq ft)	
Museum	Louvre Museum	France	Paris	210,000 m^{2} (2,260,421 sq ft)	
Current residence	Presidential Complex	Turkey	Ankara	200,020 m^{2} (2,152,997 sq ft)	
Current royal residence	Istana Nurul Iman	Brunei	Bandar Seri Begawan	200,000 m^{2} (2,152,782 sq ft)	
Royal palace	Louvre Palace	France	Paris	244,000 m^{2} (2,626,000 sq ft)	2 million m^{3} (70 million cu ft)
Shipbuilding hall	Meyer Werft Dockhalle 2	Germany	Papenburg, Niedersachsen	63,000 m^{2} (678,000 sq ft)	4.72 million m^{3} (167 million cu ft)
Hemispherical building	Sphere	United States	Paradise, Nevada	81,300 m^{2} (875,000 sq ft)	
Residential Building	Regent International Center	China	Hangzhou	260,000m² (2,798,616 ft^{2})	

== See also ==
- List of largest office buildings
- List of largest shopping malls
- List of tallest buildings
- List of largest mosques
- List of skyscrapers by floor area
