= Cool store =

Refrigerated storage room

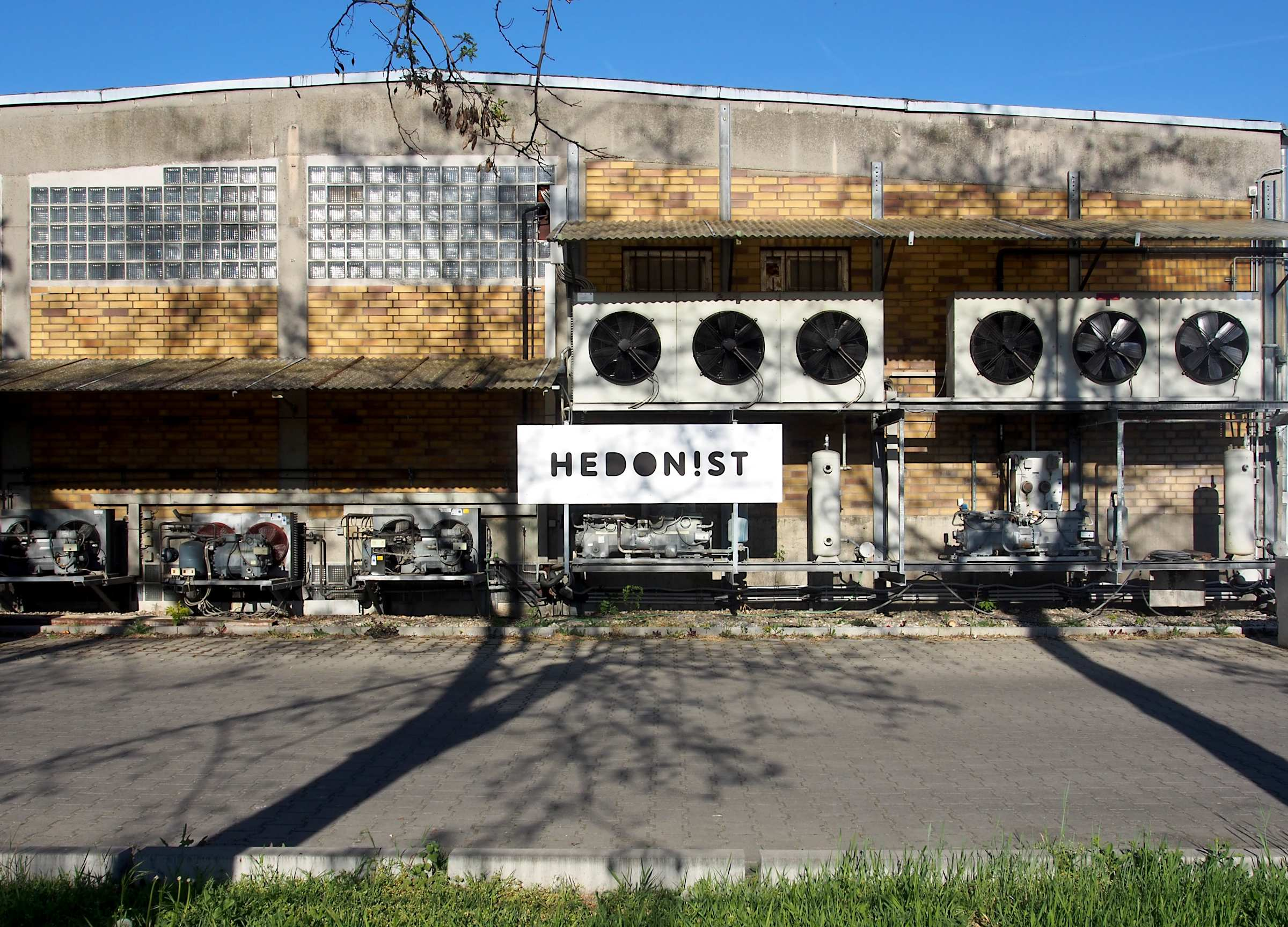
Food storage building with chillers

A cool store or cold store is a large refrigerated room or building designed for storage of goods in an environment below the outdoor temperature. Products needing refrigeration include fruit, vegetables, seafood and meat. Cold stores are often located near shipping ports used for import/export of produce. Cool stores have been an essential part of the shipping industry since the late 19th century. Christian Salvesen expanded from a small Scottish whaling company when they established a cold store in Grimsby, then a major fishing port. Nine Elms Cold Store, constructed in 1965, could hold 16,000 tons of meat, cheese and butter. It closed in 1979 and was used by squatters and various illegal activities before being demolished towards the end of the century.

The stores themselves vary in size.

== Warehouse ==
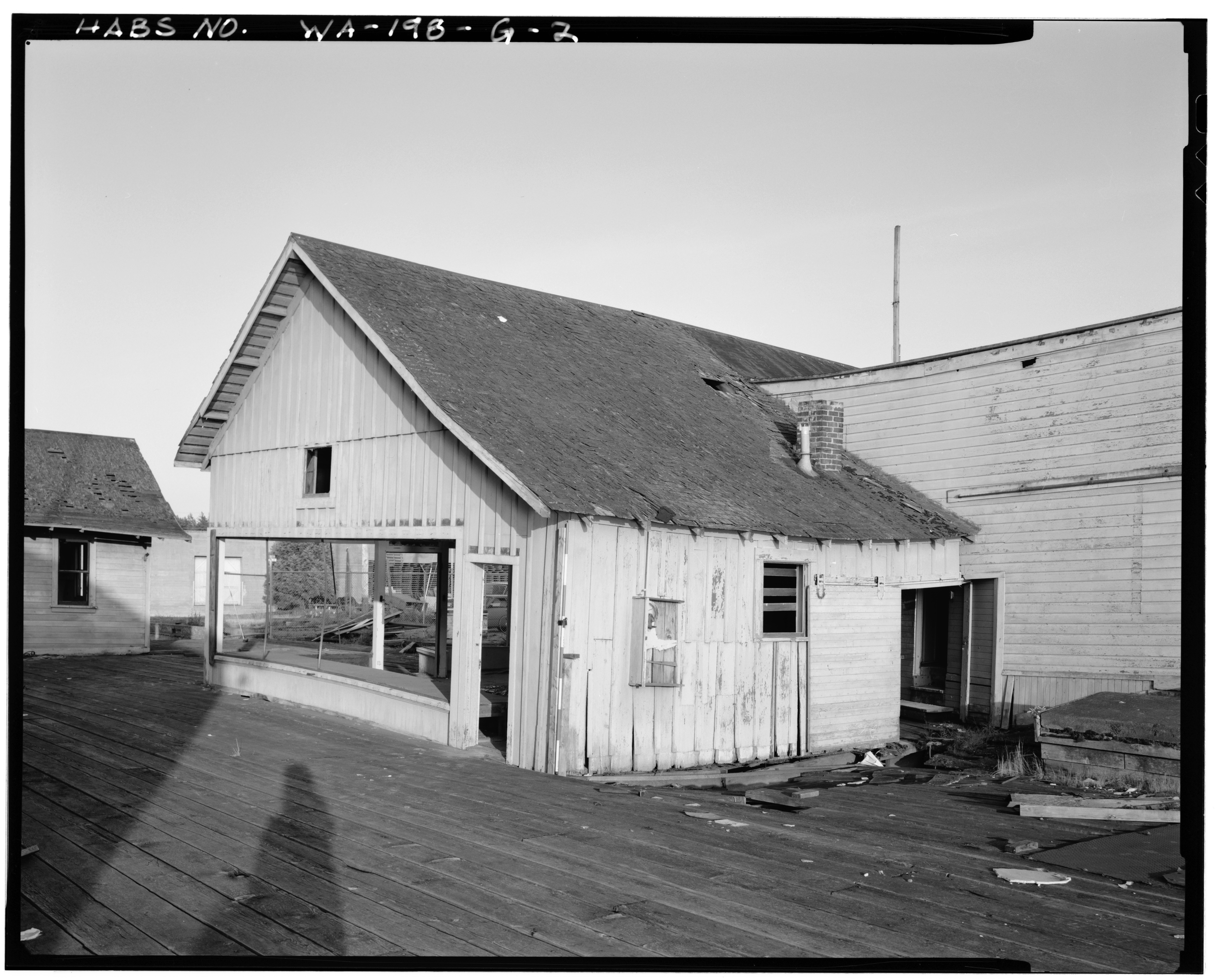
A cold storage warehouse in Anacortes, Washington

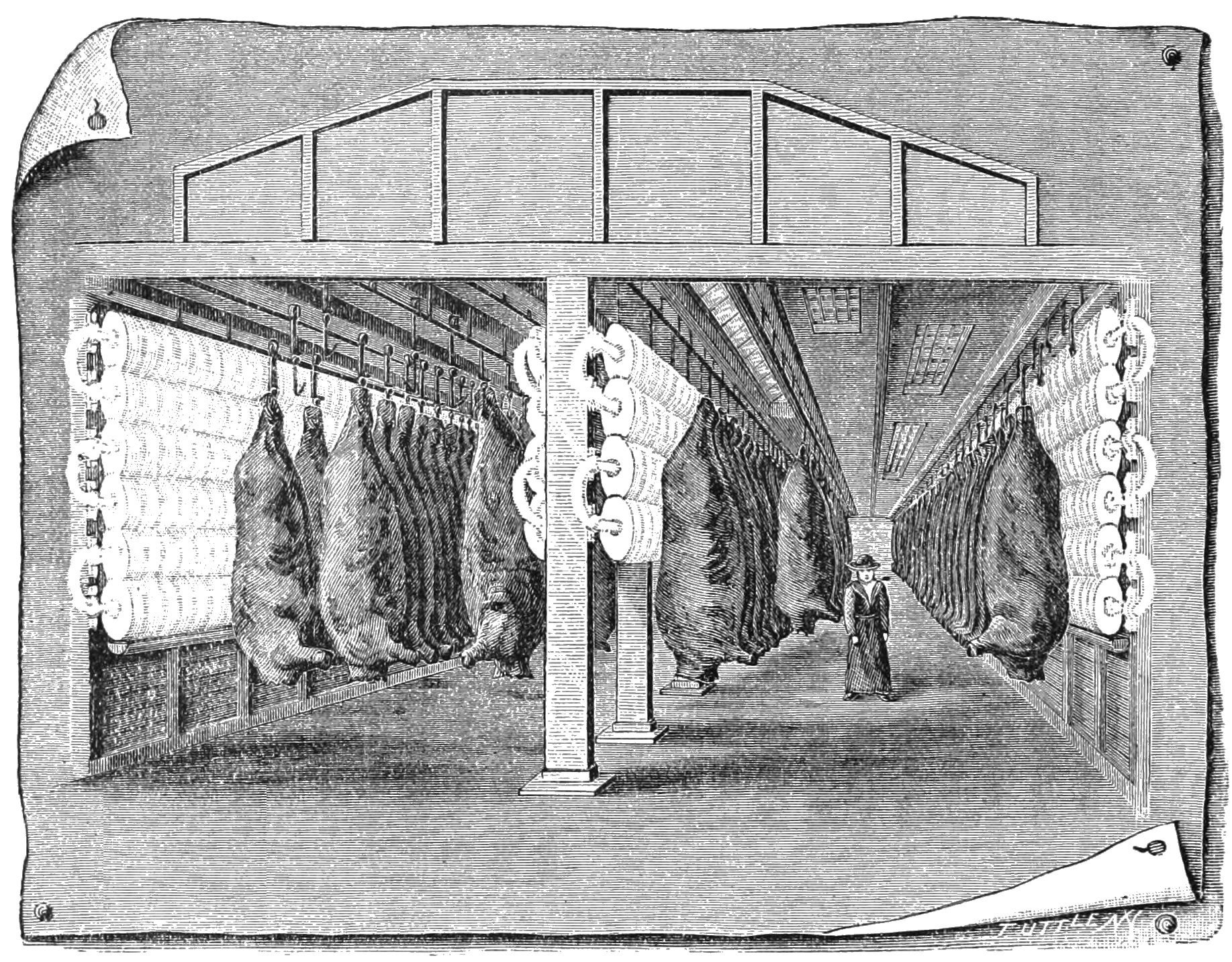
A room in a cold storage warehouse, c. 1891

A cool warehouse or cold storage warehouse is a warehouse where perishable goods are stored and refrigerated. Products stored can be, amongst other things, food, especially meat, other agricultural products, pharmaceutical drugs, other chemicals and blood.

== See also ==
- 2800 Polar Way
