= 2026 Boyle Heights warehouse fire =

Warehouse fire in Los Angeles, California

Coordinates: 34°0′56″N 118°11′37″W

On June 17, 2026, a fire began in a frozen food warehouse leased by Lineage Logistics in Boyle Heights, Los Angeles, California. The cause of the fire remains under investigation but became notable for the massive smoke plumes that could be seen across the Los Angeles Basin. The fire continued to burn due to flareups and reignitions that began on June 19 before being finally put out on June 24. After the fire was extinguished, the smell of the expiring frozen food became a new problem, noticeable throughout the Boyle Heights area for at least 2 months.

Los Angeles Mayor Karen Bass declared a state of emergency and issued a shelter-in-place order for Boyle Heights residents due to a biohazard threat caused by decomposing food inside the facility.

== Background ==
Lineage Logistics is the world's largest temperature-controlled warehouse real estate investment trust (REIT), owned by Bay Grove, LLC. Entering international markets in 2017, Lineage grew into the world's largest refrigerated warehousing company with a capacity exceeding 3 billion cubic feet and acquiring more than 100 companies through the end of 2023.

The warehouse is located at 1400 S. Los Palos Street and was built in 2018. A previous fire had happened at the same warehouse in 2024 but was extinguished within 48 minutes.

== Progression ==
Reports of a fire at the warehouse first began shortly after 2:30 p.m. June 17, 2026, a 491,000-square-foot commercial cold storage facility operated by Lineage Logistics at 1400 S. Los Palos St. About two hours later, a large black smoke cloud erupted over the warehouse, which could be seen throughout the city, even days after the fire had started. A state of emergency was declared three days later on June 20 by Mayor Bass.

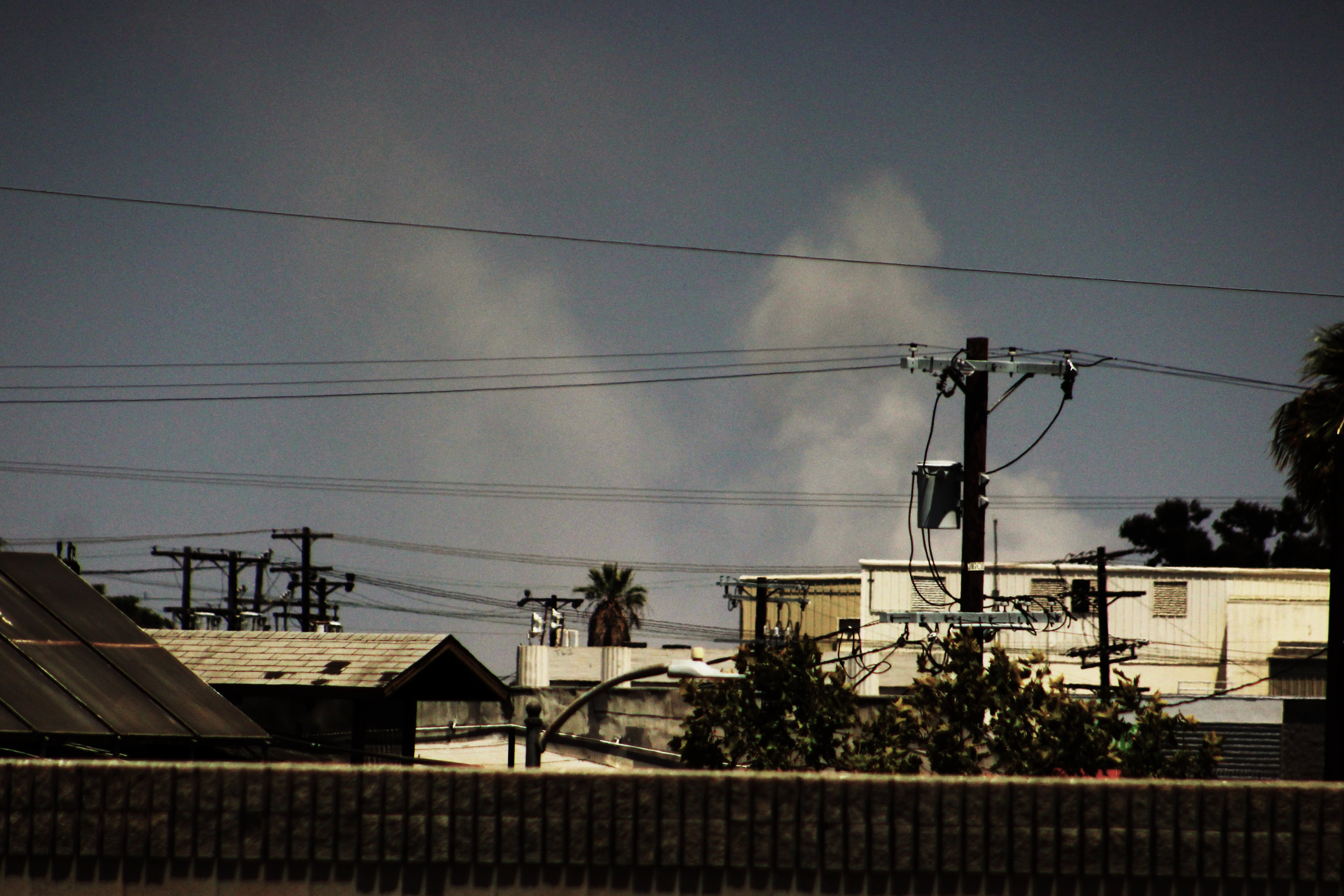
Smoke plume from the fire on June 19

Flareups continued to occur starting on June 19, sending more smoke into the air which continued to impact the local Boyle Heights community. The warehouse also experienced severe structural damage during the fire. The solar panels on the roof and the collapse of roof structure made fighting the fire difficult.

On June 18, the shelter-in-place order was briefly reinstated after crews detected hydrogen fluoride, indicating a possibility of lithium-ion battery had ignited inside the facility. Officials also raised concerns that the estimated 85 million pounds of frozen food (including bread, poultry, pork, and beef) inside the facility—no longer kept cold by the damaged refrigeration system—would begin to decompose, creating foul odors and potential biohazards, which Mayor Bass compared to food spoiling during a prolonged power outage.

Health concerns intensified as the fire continued, with officials extending particulate matter advisories and Los Angeles Unified School District relocating students from several nearby schools due to air quality impacts. Regulatory monitors and sensors recorded improved PM_{2.5} levels in Central and Southeast Los Angeles, the San Gabriel Valley, and the San Fernando Valley, though air quality near the fire itself remained elevated, with "Very Unhealthy" conditions measured throughout the day in Boyle Heights; other areas ranged from "Good" to "Moderate" for PM_{2.5}.

== Recovery ==
As operator of the warehouse property, Lineage Inc., is responsible for debris removal, including 85 million pounds of food debris, site cleanup, and public nuisance mitigation, including odor mitigation and pest control. On July 13 2026, after more than 40 complaints from locals, South Coast Air Quality Management District issued a formal citation to Lineage for failure to control foul odor.

Several relief funds have been established to help recover from disruptions from the fire, including the CCF Impact Fund, activated by the California Community Foundation to provide immediate relief for residents affected by the fire. Donations will fund direct cash assistance through Angeleno Cards, food distribution, air purifiers, masks, water, and other emergency essentials delivered through vetted community partners; and the Boyle Heights Fire Relief Fund which provides emergency financial assistance to small businesses and street vendors impacted by the fire.

The California Community Foundation has provided grants to more than 20 community organizations working with residents impacted by the Lineage fire.

== See also ==
- 2026 Kimberly-Clark distribution center fire
- 2026 Garden Grove chemical leak
