= Airport terminal =

Airport building

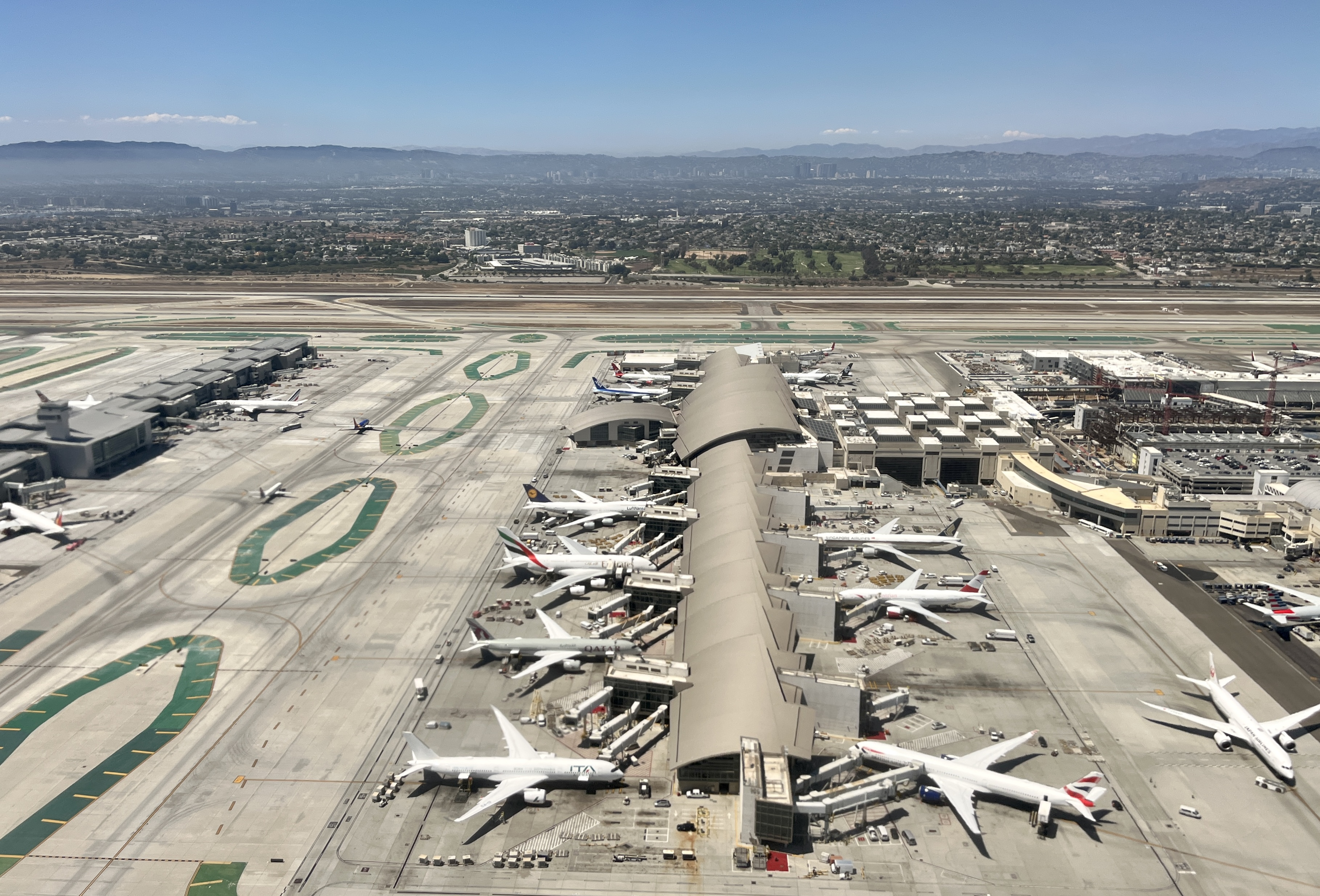
Aerial View of the Tom Bradley International Terminal of Los Angeles International Airport in July 2022. This terminal handles the most origin and destination (O&D) flights in the world.

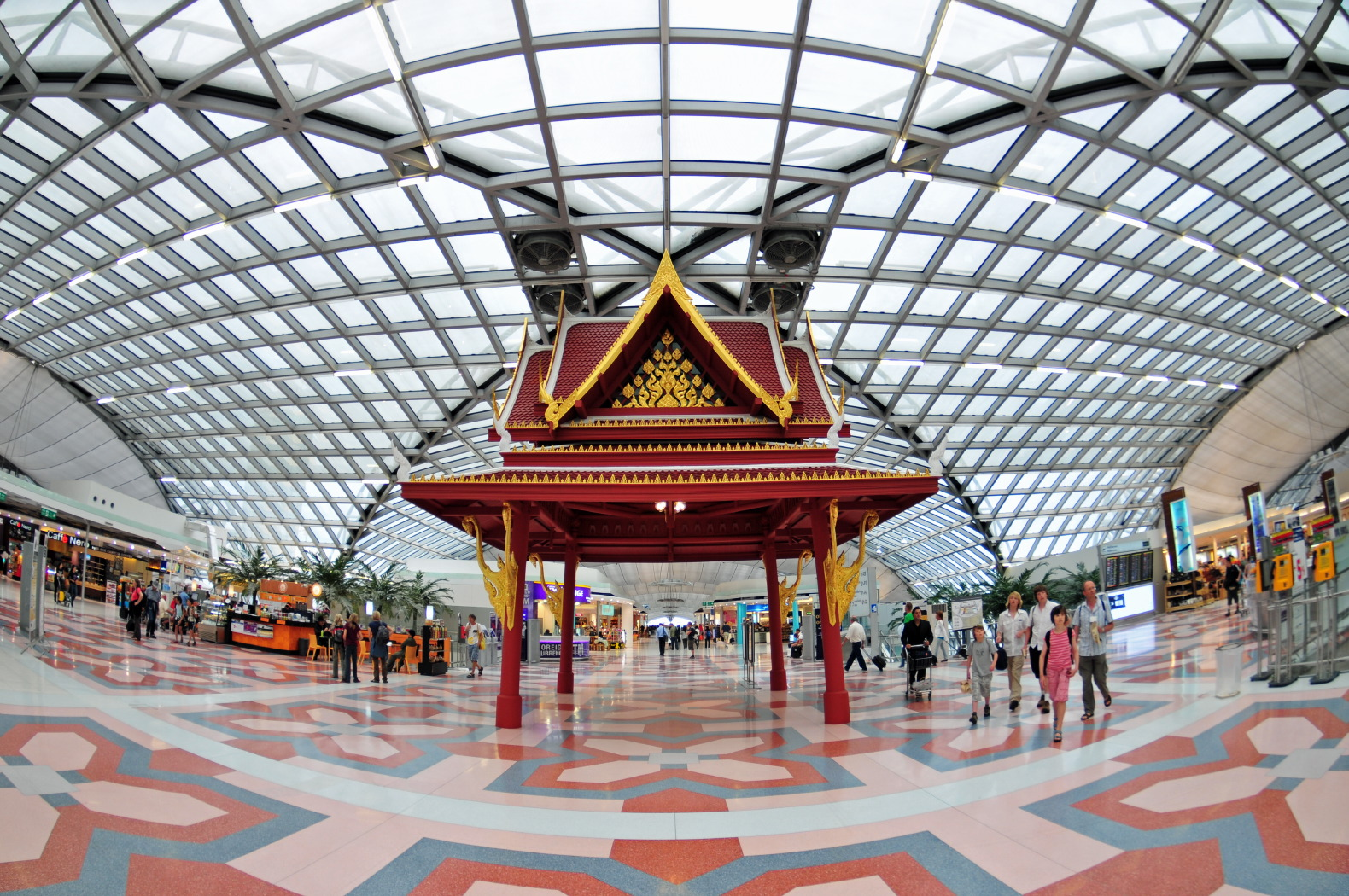
Interior of Bangkok Suvarnabhumi Airport Main Terminal Concourse in July 2008.

An airport terminal is a main building at an airport where passengers transfer between ground transportation and the facilities that allow them to board and disembark from an aircraft.

The buildings that provide access to the airplanes (via gates) are typically called concourses. However, the terms "terminal" and "concourse" are sometimes used interchangeably, depending on the configuration of the airport. Smaller airports have one terminal while larger airports have several terminals and/or concourses. At small airports, a single terminal building typically serves all of the functions of a terminal and a concourse. Larger airports might have either one terminal that is connected to multiple concourses or multiple almost independent unit terminals.

By the end of the 20th century airport terminals became symbols of progress and trade, showcasing the aspirations of nations constructing them. The buildings are also characterized by a very rapid pace of redevelopment, much higher than that for structures supporting other modes of transportation, eroding the boundary between the permanent and temporary construction.

== Unit terminals ==
An airport might have multiple separate "unit terminals", in order, for example to separate the international travel from the domestic one, or provide the separate airlines with the ability to offer their own terminals. The unit terminals might use similar design (Dallas-Fort Worth Airport) or be completely different (Pearson International Airport). Use of multiple terminals typically requires automatic people movers.

== Functions ==
Terminals perform three main functions:

- change of mode of transportation: the flights almost inevitably involve some land travel, so the terminal should facilitate the passengers moving along the prescribed routes and thus contains so called passenger circulation areas;
- processing of the passengers and their luggage that includes ticketing / checking-in of passengers, separating the luggage and returning it back to the passengers, security checks of both passengers and luggage. These functions are performed in the passenger processing spaces;
- grouping/ungrouping of the passengers. The passengers do not arrive at the terminal pre-sorted in batches for the flights and have to be grouped to board a plane. Upon arrival, a reverse process occurs, so the terminal needs the passenger holding place.

=== Landside and airside ===
Just like entire airports, the terminals are divided into landside and airside zones. Typically passengers and staff must be checked by airport security, and/or customs/border control before being permitted to enter the airside zone. Conversely, passengers arriving from an international flight must pass through border control and customs to access the landside area.

The landside-airside boundary became the defining element of the terminal architecture. The functions that are performed on the landside, like ticketing and check-in, are relatively stable, while the airside is subject to rapid technological and operational changes. Victor Marquez suggests that the boundary is not really an integral part of the airport functions, but a "socio-technical construct" that has gradually shaped the thinking of architects and planners.

== Architectural styles ==
The passenger terminal is the main opportunity within the airport for architects to express themselves and a key element of the airport design. Brian Edwards compares the architectural role of the terminal in the airport to the one of a mall within a small town.

Historically, airports were built in a variety of architectural styles, with the selection depending on the country:

- in the US, Art Deco was used for the Kansas's Fairfax Airport (1929, Charles A. Smith, Moderne for Washington Airport (1930, Holden, Scott and Hutchinson), Neocolonial for the first St. Louis airport (1931) and the Floyd Bennett Field (1931); Adobe style for Albuquerque Airport (1936–1939, Ernest Blumenthal), Spanish-pueblo style for the San Francisco Airport (1937, H. G. Chipier), International Modern for Chicago Airport, Moderne/Art Deco combination for the Miami Airport and LaGuardia (Delano and Aldrich);
- South America was following the US pattern, with more Modern in the mix;
- Europe preferred all stripes of Modernism, from Brick Expressionism (Madrid–Barajas Airport, 1929–1931, Luis Gutiérrez Soto) to edgy French Modernism and Czech version of functionalism (Prague Airport, 1933–1937, Adolf Benš) to softer Scandinavian functionalism (Kastrup Airport, 1936–1938, Vilhelm Lauritzen). Few early terminals used Neoclassical style of the Edwardian era, a terminal in the old Basra Airport was built to resemble a palace (1937–1938, Wilson and Mason).

The concrete boxes of terminals built in the 1960s and 1970s generally gave way to glass boxes in the 1990s and 2000s, with the best terminals making a vague stab at incorporating ideas of "light" and "air"'. However, some, such as Baghdad International Airport and Denver International Airport, are monumental in stature, while others are considered architectural masterpieces, such as Terminal 1 at Charles de Gaulle Airport, near Paris, the main terminal at Washington Dulles in Virginia, or the TWA Flight Center at New York's JFK Airport. A few are designed to reflect the culture of a particular area, some examples being the terminal at Albuquerque International Sunport in New Mexico, which is designed in the Pueblo Revival style popularized by architect John Gaw Meem, as well as the terminal at Bahías de Huatulco International Airport in Huatulco, Oaxaca, Mexico, which features some palapas that are interconnected to form the airport terminal."

== History ==
The first airfields, built in the early 20th century, did not have passengers and thus did not need the terminals. Large facilities were built, however, to house the fragile and inventive airships of the time protecting them from elements and industrial spies. Still, some of the concept architectural designs resembled the modern terminal buildings: Erich Mendelsohn’s sketch (1914) contained a large building with the attached ancillaries for planes (the central building was intended not for the passengers, but for a dirigible). The predecessors of the modern terminals were the structures erected for the air shows of the Edwardian era (for example, the Reims Air Meet in 1909). These buildings usually were L-shaped, with one wing dedicated to the planes and flight personnel, and the other intended for the spectators, with a grandstand and restaurants in an arrangement similar to the one used for the racetracks. The shows also featured occasional passenger flights. The other template of a terminal was provided by the first airline, the German DELAG that featured sheds for Zeppelins combined with passenger spaces close to the centers of cities, like the railroad stations.

The first European passenger airports of the interwar period in the major transportation nodes (London, Paris, Berlin) were converted military airfields (London Terminal Aerodrome, Croydon Aerodrome, Great West Aerodrome, Le Bourget, Tempelhof) and lacked the spaces for the actual passengers. US, on the other hand, lacked the war infrastructure and had to build the airports from scratch, mostly following the "hangar-depot" building type where, staff, passengers, and airplanes were all accommodated inside a single large building, like the one at the Ford Dearborn Airport (1925–1926).

Dedicated passenger buildings started to appear. In Europe, Le Bourget got a new buildings in classical style arranged in very non-airport-like manner around a central garden in the early 1920s. The "air station" of Königsberg Devau (1922) was probably the first design resembling the modern ones: Hanns Hopp, a German architect, placed a passenger building flanked by hangars into the corner of an airfield. This design influenced the Tempelhof, arguably the seminal design in the history or airports: the original Modernist terminal by Paul and Klaus Englers of 1926-1929 was placed into the center of the field, thus defied the need for expansion, and had to be replaced by the new building in the late 1930s (architect Ernst Sagebiel). Hounslow (now Heathrow airport) was processing the passengers through a reused aircraft hangar, and a new classical terminal was built in Croydon in 1928. In the US, by 1931 the first airport in Chicago (now Midway Airport) had its own Art Deco terminal building.

Sagebiel's Tempelhof had an appearance of a major railway terminus and housed, like many other European airports, great restaurants. The design survived for more than 60 years, highly unusual for an airport due to Sagebiel being prescient and oversizing the building beyond the scope of the original needs.

The original Le Bourget design was corrected by Georges Labro in 1936–1937, with the new Modernist single-terminal layout following ideas of not-yet-unfinished Tempelhof (but without covered access to the planes) and Croydon.

New York's LaGuardia Airport (Delano and Aldrich, 1939) contained many features common in the modern designs: two-level layout for separation between departing and arriving passengers, "spine" concourse extending to the both sides of the building, "dispatcher booths" as precursors to the airport gates.

=== After Second World War ===
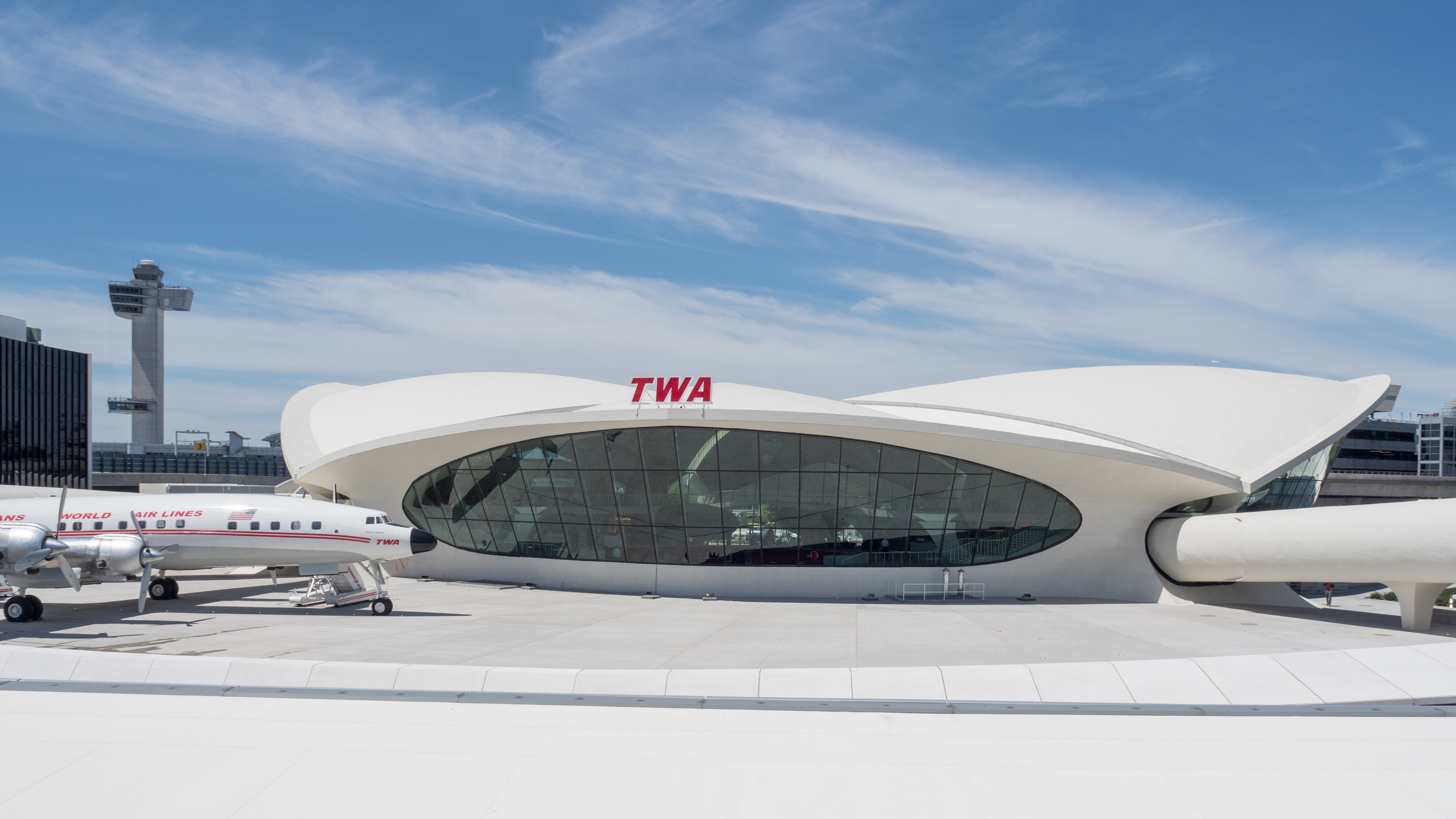
The TWA Flight Center at John F. Kennedy International Airport was built in 1962 and was used as Trans World Airlines's terminal until 2001. It was connected to the JetBlue Terminal 5 in 2008, and converted into the TWA Hotel in 2019.

Some airlines checked in their passengers at downtown terminals, and had their own transportation facilities to the airfield. For example, Air France checked in passengers at the Invalides Air Terminal (Aérogare des Invalides) from 1946 to 1961, when all passengers started checking in at the airport. The Air Terminal continued in service as the boarding point for airline buses until 2016.

Chicago's O'Hare International Airport's innovative design pioneered concepts such as direct highway access to the airport, concourses, and jetbridges; these designs are now seen at most airports worldwide.

When London Stansted Airport's new terminal opened in 1991, it marked a shift in airport terminal design since Norman Foster placed the baggage handling system in the basement in order to create a vast open interior space. Airport architects have followed this model since unobstructed sightlines aid with passenger orientation. In some cases, architects design the terminal's ceiling and flooring with cues that suggest the required directional flow. For instance, at Toronto Pearson's Terminal 1 Moshe Safdie included skylights for wayfinding purposes.

== Layouts ==
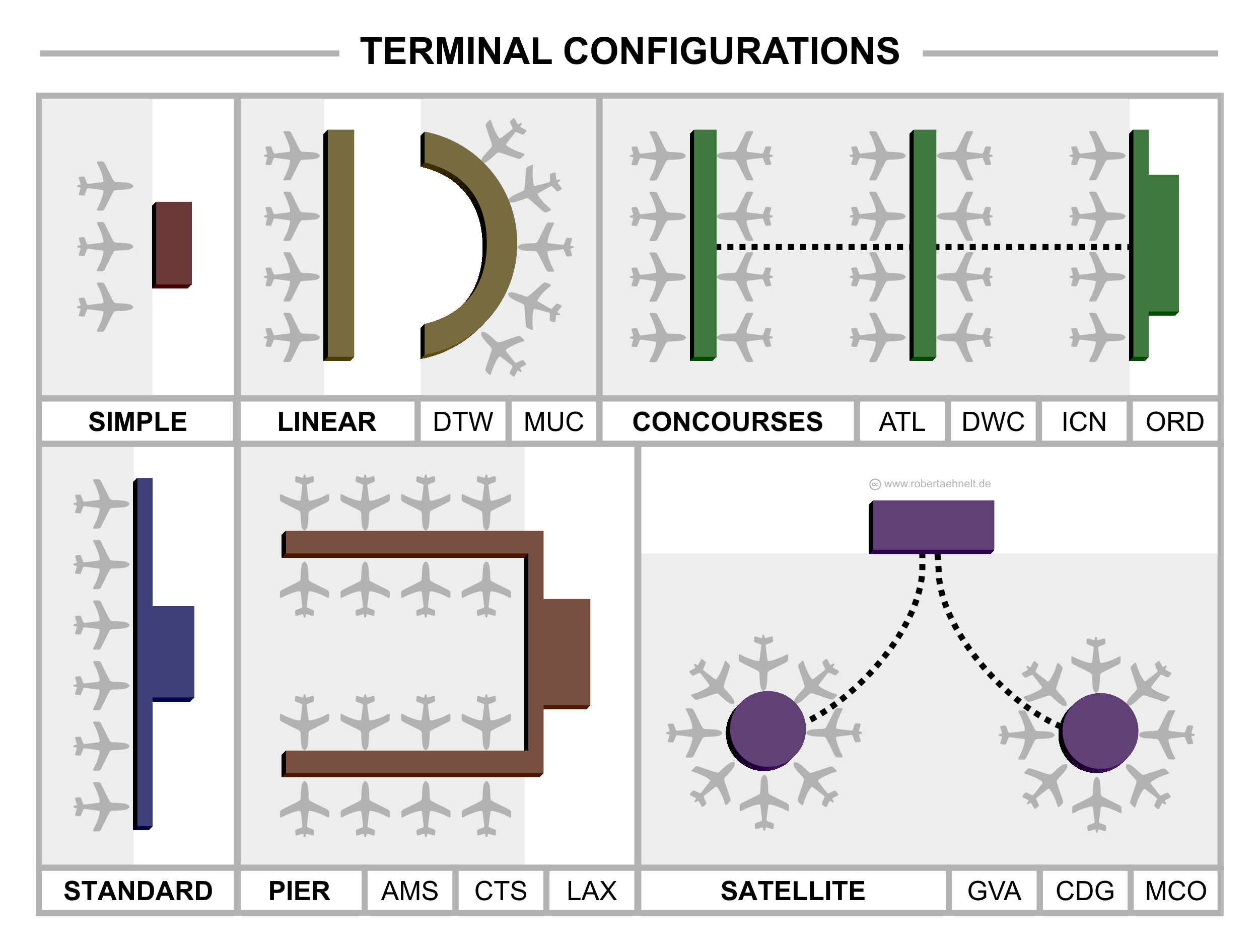
Typical terminal configurations

Early airport terminals opened directly onto the tarmac: passengers would simply walk to their aircraft, a so-called "open apron" layout. This simple design is still common among smaller airports.

=== Linear ===
For larger airports, like Kansas City International Airport, Munich Airport and Charles de Gaulle Airport, allowing many passenger to walk across tarmac becomes unfeasible, so the terminals switch to the "linear" layout, where the planes are located next to an elongated building and passengers use jet bridges to walk on board. The design places limit on the number of gates, as the walkability requirement dictates the total length of the building (including the "spine" concourses) to be less than 1/2 mile.

==== Semicircular ====
Some airports use a linear structure bent into a semicircular shape, with aircraft parked on the convex side and cars on the other. This design still requires long walks for connecting passengers, but greatly reduces travel times between check-in and the aircraft.

=== Pier ===
A pier design uses a small, narrow building with aircraft parked on both sides. One end connects to a ticketing and baggage claim area. Piers offer high aircraft capacity and simplicity of design, but often result in a long distance from the check-in counter to the gate (up to half a mile in the cases of Kansai International Airport or Lisbon Portela Airport's Terminal 1). Most large international airports have piers, O'Hare Airport in Chicago and Hartsfield Airport in Atlanta were able to process 45 million passengers per year using this layout in the 1970s.

==== Remote pier ====
Remote pier layout consist of multiple concourses that are connected by automatic people movers located underground or overhead. Once arrived on the concourse, passengers get on the planes as usual. This layout, after its first appearance at Hartsfield, was used at Stansted Airport in UK and, with an adequate people-moving system, is considered to be very efficient for the airport hubs with high percentage of transfer passengers.

=== Satellite terminals ===
A satellite terminal is a round- or star-shaped building detached from other airport buildings, so that aircraft can park around its entire circumference. The first airport to use a satellite terminal was London Gatwick Airport. It used an underground pedestrian tunnel to connect the satellite to the main terminal. Passengers are sometimes ferried to the satellite terminals by people movers, trains, or overhead bridges. The layout has the potential to cut the walking distances and was successfully applied in the Orlando International Airport and Tampa International Airport. However, the excessive area of airport apron required and difficult remodeling for new aircraft designs had reduced its popularity. Los Angeles International Airport, in particular, switched from satellite terminals to pier layout in the 1980s.

=== Transporter terminals ===
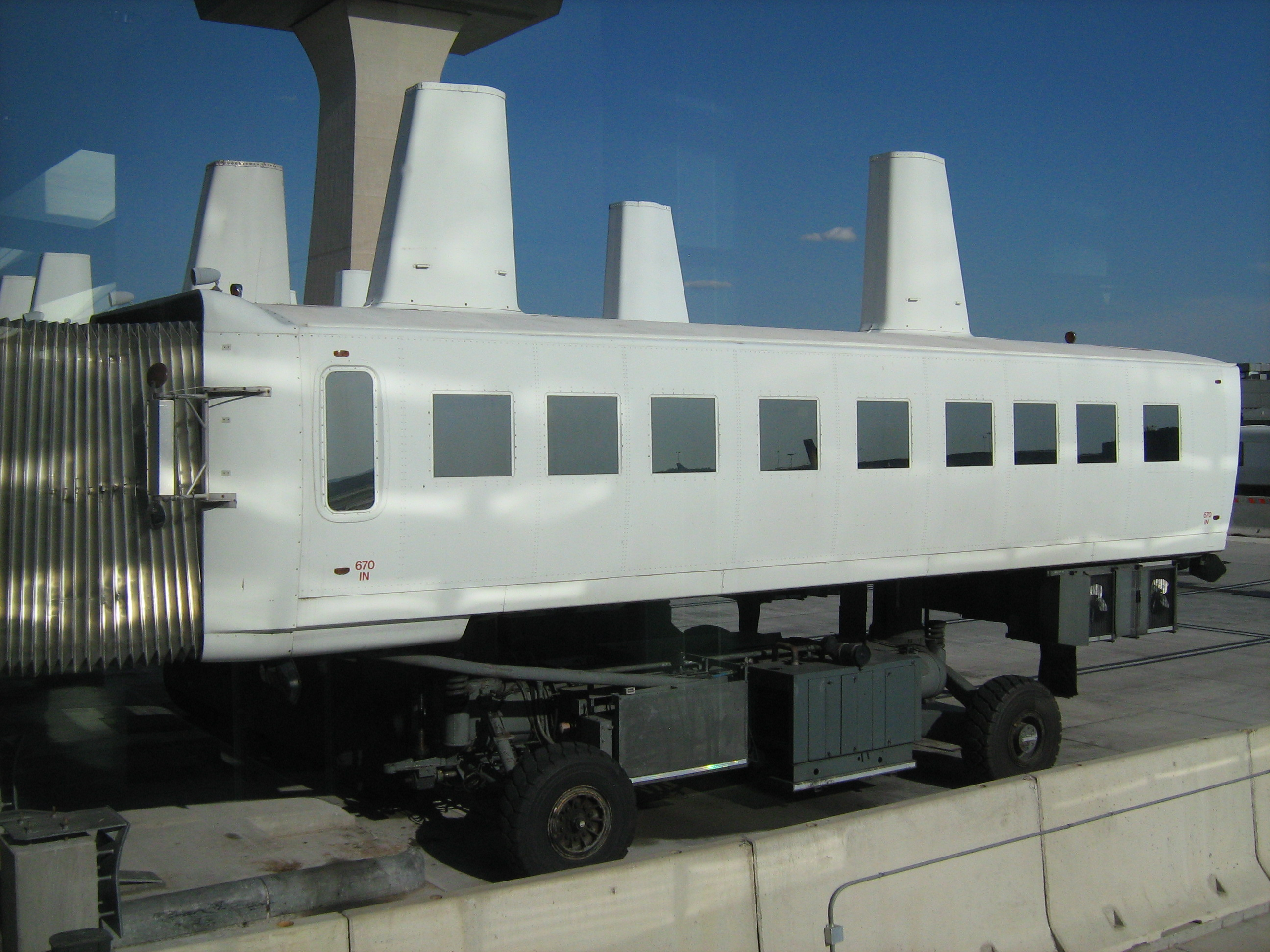
Mobile lounge docked to the terminal

The idea of a large airport using specially-built vehicles to connect passengers to the planes was driven by the desire to reduce time spent by the planes getting to and from the terminal, and dates to 1960s. The bodies of the so-called mobile lounges can be raised to match the height of the terminal and airplane exit doors (much earlier designs used regular apron buses, for example, in the Milan's Linate Airport, but the passengers in this case had to climb up and down the airstairs). While used in the Washington Dulles International Airport and King Abdulaziz International Airport, the arrangement is prone to slowing down the embarkation and disembarkation as well as accidental damage to the planes.

=== Other ===
A particularly unusual design was employed at Berlin Tegel Airport's Terminal A. Consisting of an hexagonal-shaped ring around a courtyard, five of the outer walls were airside and fitted with jet bridges, while the sixth (forming the entrance), along with the inner courtyard, was landside. Although superficially resembling a satellite design insofar as aircraft could park around most of the structure, it was in fact a self-contained terminal which unlike a satellite did not depend on remote buildings for facilities such as check-in, security controls, arrivals etc.

Especially unique were its exceptionally short walking distances and lack of any central area for security, passport control, arrivals or transfer. Instead, individual check-in counters are located immediately in front of the gate of the flight they serve. Checked-in passengers then entered airside via a short passage situated immediately to the side of the check-in desk, passed (for non-Schengen flights) a single passport control booth (with officers sat in the same area as check-in staff), followed by a single security lane which terminated at the gate's waiting area behind. Pairs of gates shared the same seating area, with small kiosks for duty-free and refreshments making up the only airside commercial offerings. Thus, other than the adjacent gate, passengers could not move around the terminal airside and there was no central waiting lounge and retail area for departures. Individual rooms for arrivals, likewise serving a pair of gates, each contained a single baggage carousel and were alternately situated in between each pair of departure gates on the same level, such that the entrance/exit of each jet bridge lied at the boundary of the two areas. Two or three passport control booths were located close to the end of the jet bridge for arriving passengers (causing passengers to queue into the bridge and plane itself) and passengers left the arrivals area unsegregated from departing passengers into the same landside ring-concourse, emerging next to the check-in desks. This allowed both arriving and departing passengers immediate access to the courtyard on the same level, where short-stay parking and taxi-pickup were located. Vehicles could enter and exit via a road underpass underneath the terminal building entrance.

For flights using jet-bridges and passengers arriving or leaving by private transport, this resulted in extremely short walking distances of just a few tens of metres between vehicles and the plane, with only a slightly longer walk for public transport connections. A downside of this design is a lack of any provision for transfer flights, with passengers only able to transit landside.

Hybrid layouts also exist. San Francisco International Airport and Melbourne Airport use a hybrid pier-semicircular layout and a pier layout for the rest.

== Levels ==
Chris Blow lists the following standard options of using multiple levels in the airport terminals:

- Side-by-side arrivals and departures on a single level is the simplest option for small airports that do not use the jet bridges;
- Side-by-side arrivals and departures on two levels uses a street-level car traffic at the landside interface, with elevators and lifts bringing the passengers to and from the upper (boarding) level with jet bridges;
- Vertical stacking of arrivals and departures is adopted by the large airports. The departure spaces are located on the upper level, while the arrivals along with all baggage processing are handled at the lower level. This approach typically uses an elevated car approach for departures, so the departing passengers are dropped off at the level of (or above) the boarding gates. Deplaning passengers are guided down to the baggage reclaim area;
- Vertical segregation is used for very high passenger traffic. In this scheme, there is no mixing of departing and arriving passengers at all. While segregation can be horizontal, typical arrangement places the departure circulation onto the upper level, while the arriving passenger flow happens on the lower level (at the end of their route, the departing passengers are guided down to the airplanes).

== Components ==
=== Airbridges ===
Tempelhof faced a contemporary critique for its cantilevered roofs intended to protect the planes and passengers − but wasteful in terms of construction and limiting the future aircraft designs (in addition to the lack of separation between the boarding and deplaning passengers). The movable covered ways (precursors of the modern jet bridges) were experimented with in the 1930s. The Boeing's United Airport in Burbank, California featured retractable canopies already in the 1930. The tubes first appeared in the 1936 terminal at the London South Airport. The circular terminal design included six telescopic rectangular in section tubes for passengers, moving over the rails.

=== Ground transportation ===
Many small and mid-size airports have a single, two, or three-lane one-way loop road which is used by local private vehicles and buses to drop off and pick up passengers.

A large hub airport often has two grade-separated one-way loop roads, one for departures and one for arrivals. It may have a direct rail connection by regional rail, light rail, or subway to the downtown or central business district of the closest major city. The largest airports may have direct connections to the closest freeway. The Hong Kong International Airport has ferry piers on the airside for ferry connections to and from mainland China and Macau without passing through Hong Kong immigration controls.

The terminal at London South (now known as Gatwick Airport) featured the first direct rail link connection (to the London Victoria Station). The rail ticket was included with the airfare.

=== Check-in desks ===
A common-use facility or terminal design disallows airlines to have its own proprietary check-in counters, gates and IT systems. Rather, check-in counters and gates can be flexibly reassigned as needed. This is used at Boston Logan International Airport's Terminal E.

=== Centralized luggage handling ===
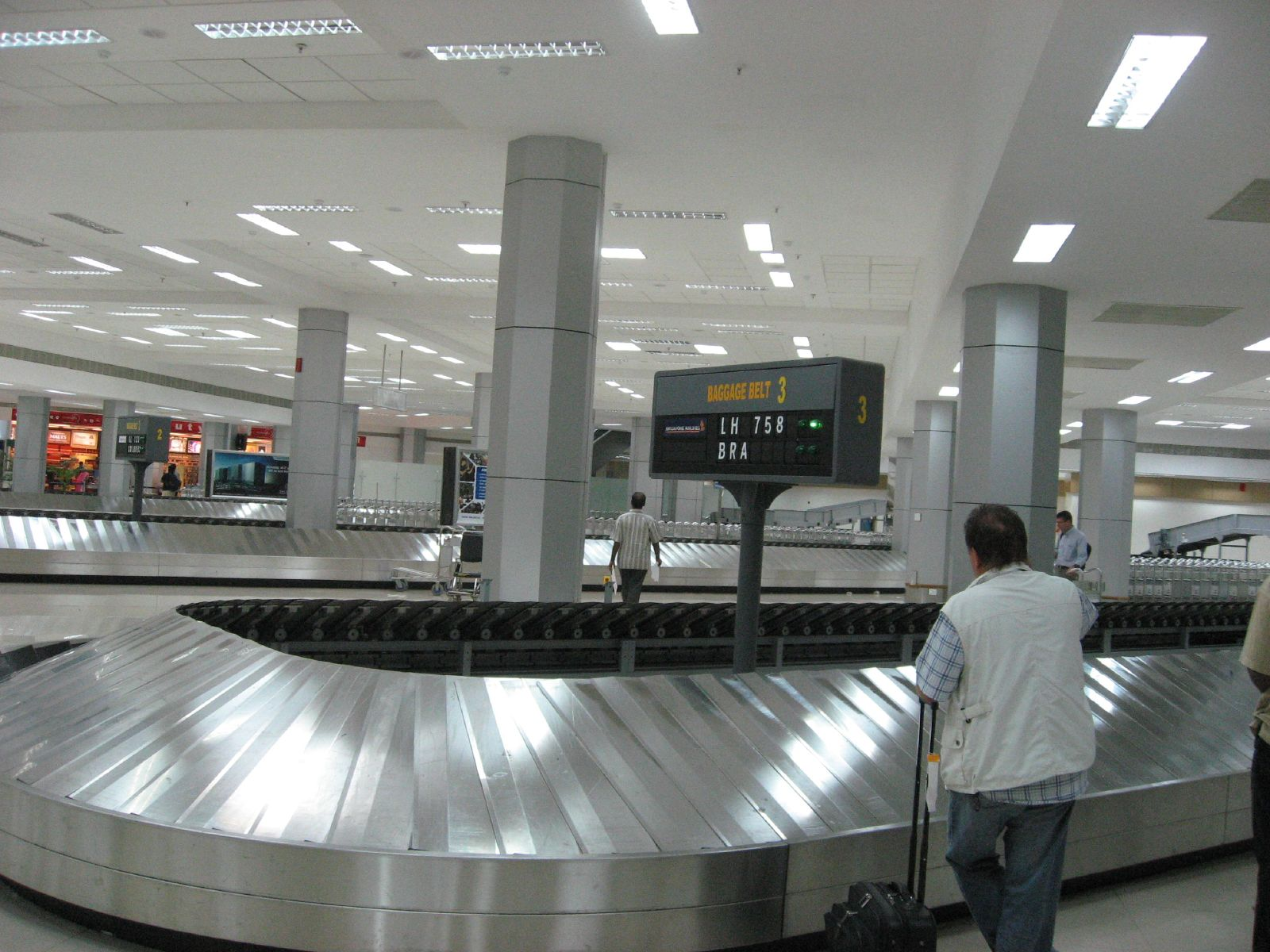
Modern baggage carousel

The system for early separation of departing passengers from their luggage (check-in desk) was introduced in the Speke Airport in Liverpool (1937–1938). It remains a key element of design of most passenger terminals ever since.

=== Security ===
Originally, the airport terminals were secured the same way as the rail stations, with local police guarding against the common crimes, like pickpocketing. The industry-specific crimes were rare, although the first plane hijacking occurred in the 1931 (in Peru). The 1960s brought the waves of terrorism and the tight security based on the ICAO recommendations. By the 1990s both passengers and luggage were routinely screened for weapons and explosive devices. The old floorplans of terminals were frequently inadequate (and structures not strong enough to carry the weight of the new equipment), so extensive redesign was required. Passenger garages integrated into the terminals were moved out to reduce the potential effects of the car bombs. Time spent by passengers at the airports greatly increased, causing the need for additional space.

== Records ==
This table below lists the top airport terminals throughout the world with the largest amount of floor area, with usable floor space across multiple stories of at least 400,000 m^{2} (4,300,000 ft^{2}).

Name	Country and territory	Place/City	Floor area	Notes
Dubai International Airport Terminal 3	United Arab Emirates	Dubai	1,713,000 m^{2} (18,440,000 sq ft)	Three buildings connected by tunnels
Guangzhou Baiyun International Airport Terminal 1-2 complex	China	Guangzhou	1,561,000 m^{2} (16,800,000 sq ft)	
Istanbul Airport	Turkey	Istanbul	1,440,000 m^{2} (15,500,000 sq ft)	World's largest airport terminal under one single roof
Amsterdam Schiphol Airport	Netherlands	Amsterdam	1,300,000 m^{2} (14,000,000 sq ft)	Largest single airport terminal in the European Union with seven piers and three departure halls under a single roof
Beijing Capital International Airport Terminal 3	China	Beijing	986,000 m^{2} (10,610,000 sq ft)	Three buildings connected by train
Hamad International Airport	Qatar	Doha	824,000 m^{2} (8,870,000 sq ft)	Terminal area formally 725,000m2 before addition of concourses D & E
King Abdulaziz International Airport Terminal 1	Saudi Arabia	Jeddah	810,000 m^{2} (8,700,000 sq ft)	
Abu Dhabi International Airport Terminal A	United Arab Emirates	Abu Dhabi	780,000 m^{2} (8,400,000 sq ft)	Opened in November 2023
Beijing Daxing International Airport Terminal	China	Beijing	700,000 m^{2} (7,500,000 sq ft)	
Shanghai Pudong International Airport Satellite Concourse	China	Shanghai	622,000 m^{2} (6,700,000 sq ft)	World's largest stand-alone satellite terminal
Hong Kong International Airport Terminal 1	Hong Kong	Chek Lap Kok	570,000 m^{2} (6,100,000 sq ft)	
Suvarnabhumi Airport	Thailand	Bang Phli	563,000 m^{2} (6,060,000 sq ft)	
Kunming Changshui International Airport	China	Kunming	548,300 m^{2} (5,902,000 sq ft)	
Barcelona Airport Terminal 1	Spain	Barcelona	544,000 m^{2} (5,860,000 sq ft)	
Chongqing Jiangbei International Airport Terminal 3A	China	Chongqing	530,000 m^{2} (5,700,000 sq ft)	
Indira Gandhi International Airport Terminal 3	India	Delhi	502,000 m^{2} (5,400,000 sq ft)	
Incheon International Airport Terminal 1	South Korea	Incheon	496,000 m^{2} (5,340,000 sq ft)	
Wuhan Tianhe International Airport Terminal 3	China	Wuhan	495,000 m^{2} (5,330,000 sq ft)	
Qingdao Jiaodong International Airport	China	Qingdao	478,000 m^{2} (5,150,000 sq ft)	
Barajas Airport Terminal 4 main building	Spain	Madrid	470,000 m^{2} (5,100,000 sq ft)	
Shenzhen Bao'an International Airport Terminal 3	China	Shenzhen	459,000 m^{2} (4,940,000 sq ft)	
Chhatrapati Shivaji International Airport Terminal 2	India	Mumbai	450,000 m^{2} (4,800,000 sq ft)	
Narita International Airport Terminal 1	Japan	Narita	440,000 m^{2} (4,700,000 sq ft)	
Soekarno–Hatta International Airport Terminal 3	Indonesia	Jakarta	422,804 m^{2} (4,551,020 sq ft)	

== See also ==
- Airport rail link
- Environmental impact of aviation
- International zone

== Sources ==
- Pearman, H. (2004). Airports: A Century of Architecture. Laurence King. ISBN 978-1-85669-356-1.
- Mironov, Lilia (2020-02-06). Airport Aura: A Spatial History of Airport Infrastructure (PDF). vdf Hochschulverlag AG an der ETH Zürich. doi:10.3218/3991-7. hdl:20.500.12657/49888. ISBN 978-3-7281-3991-7.
- Ashford, N.J.; Mumayiz, S.; Wright, P.H. (2011). Airport Engineering: Planning, Design, and Development of 21st Century Airports. Wiley. ISBN 978-0-470-39855-5.
- Marquez, V. (2019). Landside | Airside: Why Airports Are the Way They Are. Springer Nature Singapore. ISBN 978-981-13-3362-0.
- Edwards, B. (2004). The Modern Airport Terminal: New Approaches to Airport Architecture. Taylor & Francis. ISBN 978-1-134-53763-1.
- Blow, Chris (2007). "Terminals and transport interchanges". In Adler, D. (ed.). Metric Handbook (PDF). Taylor & Francis. ISBN 978-1-136-37812-6.
