= Soekarno–Hatta International Airport Terminal 3 =

Soekarno-Hatta International Airport Terminal 3

General information
- Type: International terminal
- Location: Tangerang, Banten, Indonesia
- Coordinates: 6.120379°S 106.660107°E
- Completed: June 2016
- Opened: 9 August 2016 (official)
- Inaugurated: 9 August 2016 (Domestic); 1 May 2017 (International)
- Cost: USD 600 million (2016)
- Client: PT Angkasa Pura II
- Owner: Government of Indonesia

Technical details
- Structural system: Steel frame roof with glass facades
- Floor count: 4
- Floor area: 422,804 m^{2} (4,551,020 sq ft)

Design and construction
- Architecture firm: Woodhead Associates
- Main contractor: Kawahapejaya Indonesia KSO

Soekarno–Hatta International Airport Terminal 3 is a terminal of Soekarno–Hatta International Airport serving Greater Jakarta, Indonesia. It is located on northeast side of the airport. Terminal 3 has a different style to other terminals of the airport. Terminal 1 and 2 were built with incorporation of the local Javanese architecture into the design, but Terminal 3 is built in contemporary modern design with a degree of environmental friendly and traditional sense. The terminal was first named as Terminal 3 Ultimate before it was renamed simply as Terminal 3.

Garuda Indonesia operates all of its flights from this terminal. Most foreign airlines and several local airlines serving the airport also fly from this terminal. In 2017, the terminal was named as the best airport terminal in Indonesia at the ninth Bandara Awards initiated by Majalah Bandara.

== History ==
The former Terminal 3 was officially opened for commercial flights when Mandala Airlines and Indonesia AirAsia started operations in T3 for their domestic flights on 20 April 2009 followed by international flights on 15 November 2011. The old Terminal 3 had a capacity of 4 million passengers per annum, 30 check-in counters, 6 baggage carousels and 3 gates with two jet bridges. In 2012, Angkasa Pura II, the airport operator, undertook a master plan to upgrade Soekarno-Hatta International airport into a world class airport and ultimately build an Aerotropolis. The expansion of Terminal 3 is part of the masterplan. Terminal 3 was initially projected to serve 60 airplanes.

The new Terminal 3 officially opened for commercial aviation on 9 August 2016. At first, the new T3 had no link with the old T3 building. The old T3 is now renovated and connections between the new and old terminals have been built. Airlines that belonged to SkyTeam alliance gradually moved from T2 to the new T3, starting with Garuda Indonesia on 1 May 2017, Saudia on 10 July, Vietnam Airlines on 12 July, Korean Air on 17 July, and XiamenAir on 30 July, respectively. It was later announced that in December 2017, all international flights will be using the new T3.

== Facilities ==
Check-in desks at Terminal 3.

The baggage carousels at the arrival area of Terminal 3.

Terminal 3 is 1.2 kilometres long and the apron is able to serve 40 aircraft. The terminal has the capacity to serve 25 million international passengers each year. It was designed to cater as a transit point for international airlines. Spanning 422,804 square metres, the new terminal is slightly larger than Changi Airport's Terminal 3. It has 10 gates for international flights and 18 for domestic, 206 check-in counters, 38 self check-in and 12 bag drop counters, 59 aerobridges, four-star hotels, meeting rooms, duty-free shops, retail outlets, restaurants and multi-storey carparks. Total area of the main building is about 331,101 square metres, the parking building 85,578 square meters and the VVIP building 6,124 square metres. The check-in area of the terminal is arranged in eight clusters. The terminal has an automated baggage handling system featuring at least 13 conveyor belts. The parking area can accommodate 2,600 cars and 2,600 motorcycles.

Terminal 3 is equipped with BHS level 5 to detect explosives and directly move them into security blankets, an Airport Security System (ASS) which can control up to 600 CCTVs to detect faces who are available in the security register. The terminal also has "Intelligence Building Management System" (IBMS) which can control uses of water and electricity, rain water system to produce clean water from rain, a recycled water system to produce flushing water from used toilet water, and illumination technology control to illuminate the terminal depending on the weather surrounding the terminal.

Terminal 3 has WiFi access. The terminal has a Tourist Information Center (TIC) from where tourists may get information on tourist attractions, transportation, accommodation and other travel related information in Indonesia.

=== Hotel and co-working space ===
There is a premium co-working space named as APSpace in the terminal. The co-working space has serviced offices, meeting rooms, event spaces, business lounges, high speed internet. and sleeping pods which is supported by advanced technologies.

Terminal 3 also has a Digital Airport Hotel or capsule hotel with 120 rooms, which has Alpha-type and Beta-type rooms.

A 4-star hotel, Anara Hotel, opened in 2020.

=== Commercial zone ===
Waiting area of Terminal 3.

The commercial area of Terminal 3 covers an area of 71,225 square metres. This area is divided into several zones: food & beverages with an area of 23,301 square metres, retail 22,023 square meters, servicing 2,007 square metres, duty free 4,784 square metres, lounge 8,496 square metres, exhibition 1,493 square metres, and airline offices 19,121 square metres.

=== Immigration facilities ===
As the terminal is extensively used for international flights, it has a large passport control hall, with staffed booths (for all passports) and autogates (for all Indonesian and eligible foreign passports). There is also a visa-on-arrival facility for eligible visitors before passport control.

=== Criticism ===
Since its opening, the terminal has been plagued with numerous problems, ranging from long baggage wait times, insufficient and unsafe lighting, lack of proper signage, as well as having its car parks experience near continuous traffic jams.

It also faced multiple criticisms on its design. The constructed terminal deviated considerably from the original design proposed by Woodhead Associates, eliciting allegations that the contractors were cutting corners. The perceived lack of attention to the terminal's aesthetics has also led to criticisms. In 2022, the Minister of State-Owned Enterprises Erick Thohir publicly lamented the poor quality of the terminal's carpets.

In April 2026, the terminal's poor construction came into the spotlight again when the ceiling near a gate collapsed after a spell of heavy rain.

Another common complaint is the poor structuring of the terminal with long distances to gates and a lack of sufficiently-fast travelators. The terminal is also not well-catered for handling international transit passengers.

== Service ==
Terminal 3 is the airport's newest and largest terminal. This terminal is used as a hub for Garuda Indonesia as well as Pelita Air and TransNusa. Here is the list of airlines currently serving the terminal.

=== Domestic ===
- Garuda Indonesia
- TransNusa
- Pelita Air

=== International ===
- Air China
- Air Macau
- All Nippon Airways
- Asiana Airlines
- Cathay Pacific
- China Airlines
- China Eastern Airlines
- China Southern Airlines
- EgyptAir
- Emirates
- Etihad Airways
- Ethiopian Airlines
- EVA Air
- Garuda Indonesia
- Hainan Airlines
- Japan Airlines
- KLM
- Korean Air
- Loong Air
- Lucky Air
- Malaysia Airlines
- Oman Air
- Pelita Air
- Philippine Airlines
- Qatar Airways
- Qantas
- Royal Brunei Airlines
- Saudia
- Scoot
- Shandong Airlines
- Singapore Airlines
- Spring Airlines
- SriLankan Airlines
- Starlux Airlines
- Thai Airways International
- TransNusa
- Trinity Airways
- Turkish Airlines
- Vietnam Airlines
- XiamenAir

== Piers ==
=== 3A ===
- Garuda Indonesia
- Singapore Airlines

=== 3B ===
- All Nippon Airways
- Cathay Pacific
- China Airlines
- China Southern Airlines
- Oman Air
- Philippine Airlines
- Qantas
- Qatar Airways
- Shandong Airlines
- Starlux Airlines
- Thai Airways International
- Trinity Airways

=== 3C ===
- China Airlines
- China Eastern Airlines
- EgyptAir
- Emirates
- Etihad Airways
- EVA Air
- Japan Airlines
- KLM
- Korean Air
- Loong Air
- Malaysia Airlines
- Philippine Airlines
- Turkish Airlines
- Xiamen Air

=== 3D ===
- Air China
- Air Macau
- Asiana Airlines
- Ethiopian Airlines
- Hainan Airlines
- Royal Brunei Airlines
- Saudia
- Scoot
- Spring Airlines
- SriLankan Airlines
- Vietnam Airlines

=== 3E ===
- Lucky Air
- Pelita Air
- TransNusa

=== 3F ===
- Garuda Indonesia

== Ground transportation ==
=== Inter-terminal transfer ===
Inter-terminal transfer is available on the landside (before security). Free shuttle buses between terminals 1, 2 and 3 are available. The Skytrain people mover system also connects all terminals. The headway of the Skytrain is 5 minutes, with 7 minutes needed to transfer from Terminal 1 to Terminal 3. There is no inter-terminal transfer options in the transit area/airside.

=== To city ===
Bus services including the state-owned Perum DAMRI and other private companies provide services from the airport to various destinations in Greater Jakarta and other adjacent areas. The buses operate from 06.00 to 23.00.

The Soekarno-Hatta Airport Rail Link is connected through the Skytrain system. The railway service connects the airport to the city centre of Jakarta.

== See also ==
- Soekarno-Hatta International Airport
- List of largest buildings in the world
- Garuda Indonesia
- SkyTeam
- Changi Airport Terminal 3
