= 2800 Polar Way =

Warehouse in Washington state, U.S.

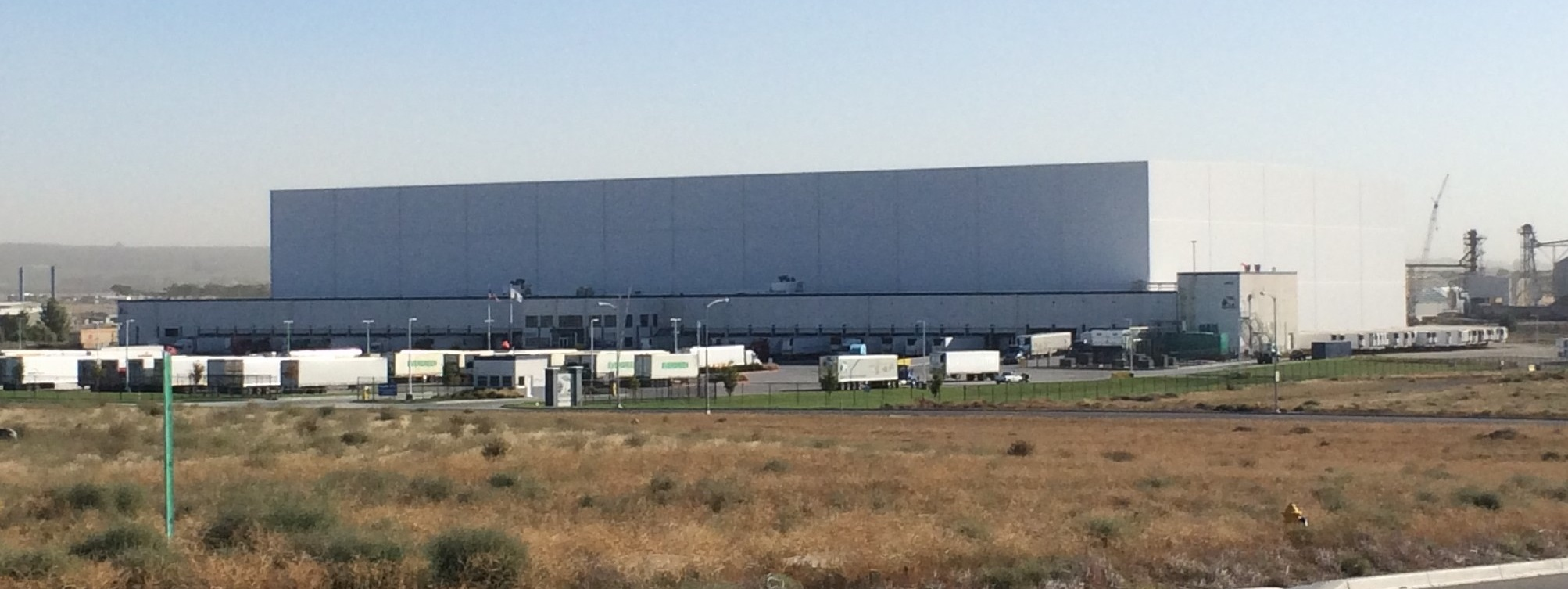
- The facility in 2016

General information
- Status: Completed
- Type: Cold storage facility
- Location: 2800 Polar Way; Richland, Washington
- Coordinates: 46.3357°N 119.3044°W
- Current tenants: Preferred Freezer Services
- Construction started: May 12, 2014
- Completed: July 2015
- Opening: July 24, 2015
- Cost: $115 million
- Owner: Lexington Realty Trust

Height
- Height: 116 ft (35 m)

Dimensions
- Other dimensions: 505,139 sq ft (46,928.9 m^{2}); 36,340,650 cu ft (1,029,053 m^{3})

2800 Polar Way is a cold storage facility located in Richland, Washington, United States. It is both the largest refrigerated warehouse and the largest automated freezer on Earth. Holliday Fenoglio Fowler (HFF) financed the build-to-suit refrigerated warehouse for tenant Preferred Freezer Services. The project broke ground on May 12, 2014, and opened in late July 2015.

In 2016, HHF sold the property to Lexington Realty Trust, an S&P 600 REIT company. In 2019, Lineage Logistics acquired Preferred Freezer, and continues to operate the facility.

== Capacity ==
The warehouse has an area of 505,139 square feet (46,928.9 m^{2})—of which 456,412 square feet (42,402.1 m^{2}) is refrigerated—and a volume of 36,340,650 cubic feet (1,029,053 m^{3}). The facility is capable of storing about 350 million pounds (160 kt) of frozen food. 2800 Polar Way is the largest refrigerated building on earth by usable volume.

In 2019, the company purchased an additional 8.6-acre (3.5 ha) lot to expand facilities by one third.
