= Lineage (company) =

International warehousing and logistics management corporation

Lineage, Inc.
- Type: Public
- Traded as: Nasdaq: LINE; Russell 1000 component
- Industry: Warehousing and supply chain logistics
- Founded: April 18, 2012; 14 years ago in Colton, California, United States
- Headquarters: Novi, Michigan, U.S.
- Area served: North America; Europe; Asia-Pacific
- Key people: Greg Lehmkuhl (CEO and president)
- Revenue: ▲US$5.3 billion (2023)
- Net income: ▼US$−96 million (2023)
- Number of employees: 26,000
- Parent: Bay Grove Capital, LLC
- Website: onelineage.com

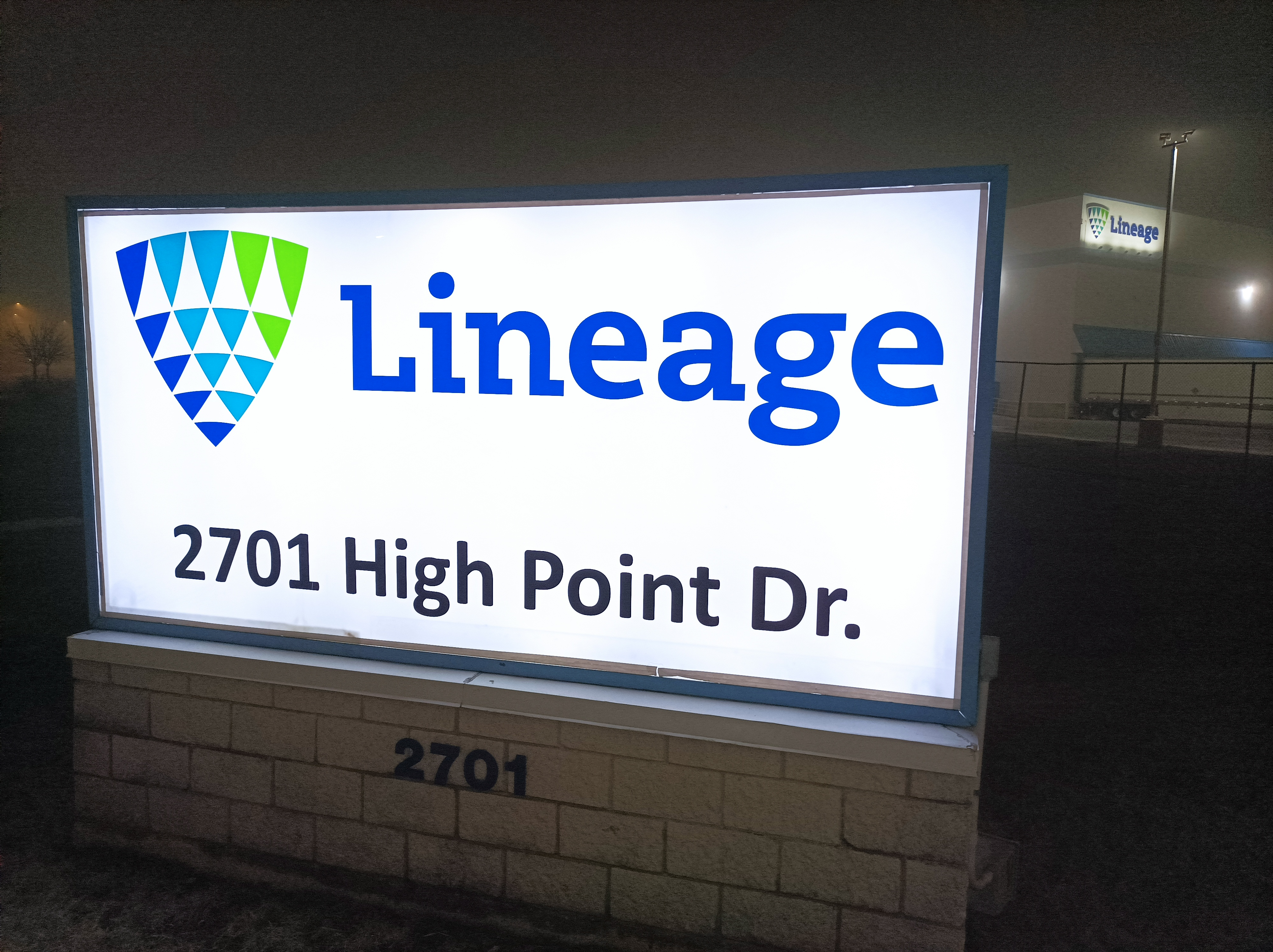
Lineage warehouse facility

Lineage, Inc. (formerly Lineage Logistics) is the world's largest temperature-controlled warehouse real estate investment trust (REIT), owned by Bay Grove, LLC. Entering international markets in 2017, Lineage grew into the world's largest refrigerated warehousing company with a capacity exceeding 3 billion cubic feet and acquiring more than 100 companies through the end of 2023. Lineage operates over 450 facilities across 18 countries, with approximately 26,000 team members globally in North America, Europe, and Asia Pacific.

== History ==
The company was founded in April 2012 by former Morgan Stanley investment banker Adam Forste, who formed Bay Grove Capital, LLC, through the consolidation of acquired warehousing and logistics companies beginning, in December 2008, with the purchase of Seafreeze from Toyo Susian Kaisha. The company then acquired CityIce, in 2009, and Flint River Services, in 2010, followed, in 2011, by Terminal Freezers of Santa Maria, California, and Richmond Cold Storage, purchased from Atlanta Equity.

Lineage was formed with the fifth-largest network of temperature-controlled warehouse facilities in North America in 2012, according to International Association of Refrigerated Warehouses (IARW) rankings, with 40 facilities in eight states, including near international ports at Savannah, Georgia, Seattle, Washington and Norfolk, Virginia; as well as providing warehouse management, consulting, and food processing support.

In a March 2021 interview with Bloomberg, Lineage CEO Greg Lehmkuhl said the company is actively preparing its initial public offering (IPO). The company completed its IPO in July 2024 with a listing on the Nasdaq, raising around $4.5 billion, valuing the company at over $18 billion.

On April 21, 2024, a fire broke out at the Lineage cold storage facility in Benton County, Washington. The fire burned for 60 days.

On June 17, 2026 a large fire broke out at the Lineage cold storage facility in Boyle Heights, Los Angeles, accelerated by the large facility's solar panels encompassing its entire roof, refrigerants, and decaying food within the building. The fire continued into a fourth day, when a state of emergency was declared due to the fire continuing to flare up and affecting regional air quality. Shelter-in-place orders were issued in surrounding areas due to the commercial building fire.

== Operations and technology ==
By 2015, Lineage's facility network was ranked the second-largest in the world by the International Association of Refrigerated Warehouses. With 111 facilities in 21 states, Lineage also ranked as the second largest temperature-controlled warehousing and logistics company in the United States.

In September 2020, Lineage raised $1.6 billion in equity for technology and expansion.

In March 2021, Lineage raised $1.9 billion in equity for global greenfield developments, facility expansions, M&A and research and development.

In July 2021, Lineage partnered with 8VC logistics technology venture capital firm, to further invest in the transportation and logistics technology sector.

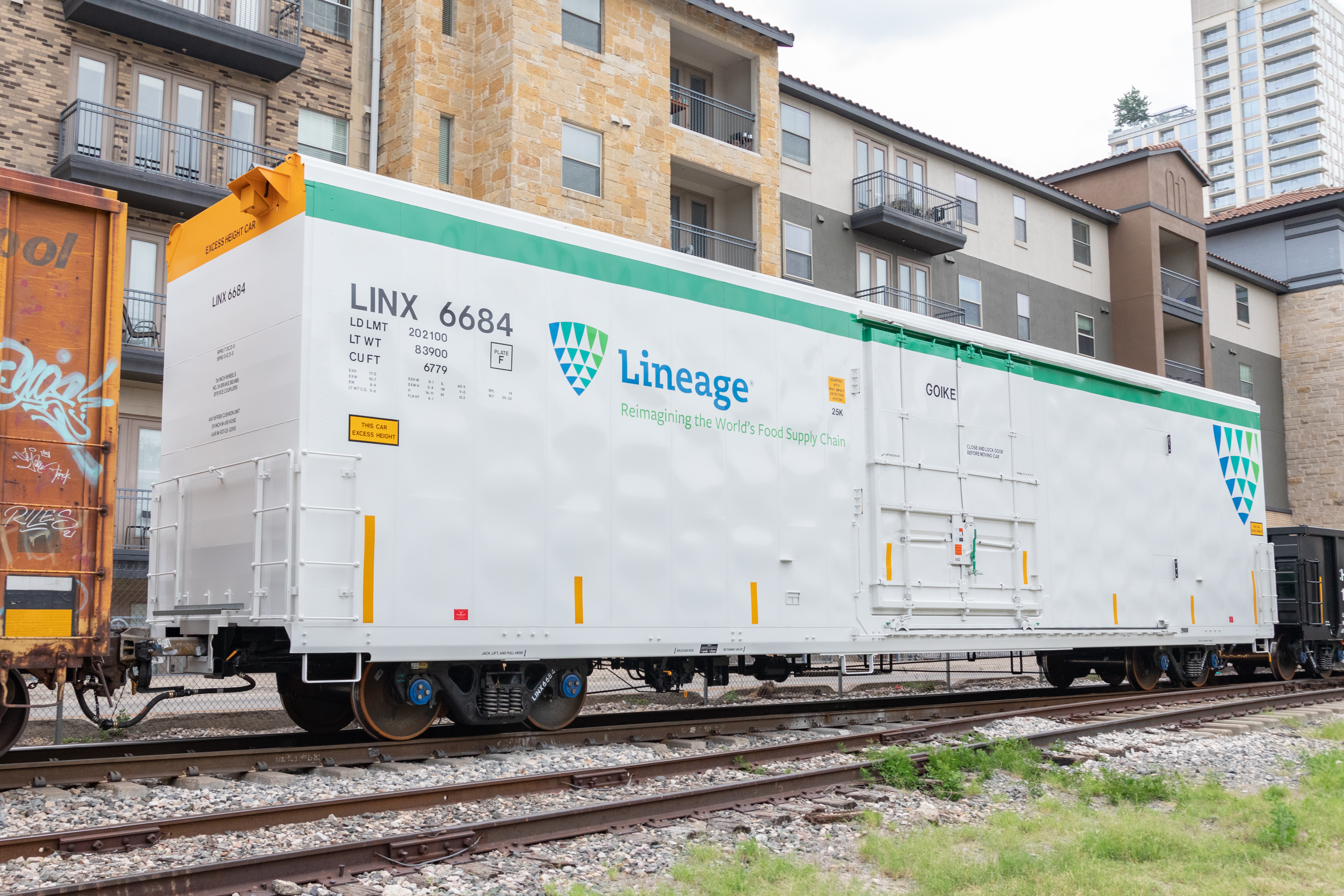
A Lineage boxcar

In November 2023, Lineage expanded and established Harnes (Pas-de-Calais) as its European logistics hub by opening a new 17,000 m^{2} (180,000 sq ft) state-of-the-art modern cold storage facility.

As of March 2024, Lineage has been granted over 75 patents registered across multiple jurisdictions, related to technological developments within the temperature-controlled logistics sector.

== Acquisitions and expansion ==
In 2012, the company acquired Stanford Refrigerated Warehouses and Castle & Cooke Cold Storage; Bill Hendricksen of Castle & Cooke then joined Lineage as CEO. Hendricksen was succeeded by W. Gregory Lehmkuhl, in July 2015. Lineage subsequently moved its headquarters from Irvine, California to Novi, Michigan.

In April 2013, the company received a $220 million loan, and acquired Seattle Cold Storage and a University Park, Illinois facility. By 2014, most Lineage customers were food producers requiring cold chain warehousing, transportation, and logistics; to meet demand, the company concentrated on automation and acquisition. In March 2014, the company agreed to purchase Millard Refrigerated Services for about $1 billion, its largest acquisition to date, making Lineage "the second-largest temperature-controlled warehousing and logistics company in the world." In the same year, Lineage acquired Loop Cold Storage, Oneida Cold Storage & Warehouse, Murphy Overseas, and two facilities in Watsonville, California from Dreisbach Enterprises and in September 2014, opened a new temperature-controlled warehouse in Santa Maria, California.

In January 2015, Lineage acquired the Pacific Northwest cold storage facilities of Columbia Colstor, headquartered in Moses Lake, Washington.

In May 2016, the company opened a $150 million temperature-controlled warehouse in North Charleston, South Carolina, near the Port of Charleston, then acquired Consolidated Distribution Corporation of Lombard, Illinois that August, making Lineage the largest customized redistribution network in the United States. Two months later, it was reported that Lineage was considering locating a large facility at New Century AirCenter in Gardner, Kansas, but the proposed location resulted in lawsuits from local residents, and Lineage scrapped the project in November 2017 "due to a change in customer needs", though the project had received unanimous approval from county commissioners in July.

Lineage entered European markets in 2017, acquiring Partner Logistics, a large cold-chain storage supplier. The company purchased facilities from American Cold Storage, in the Midwest, and eight Los Angeles, California area warehouses from U.S. Growers Cold Storage, raising its employee roster to 7,200, with Lineage operating 120 temperature-controlled storage facilities.

The company then expanded into the temperature-controlled logistics markets in Australia, New Zealand, and Sri Lanka, in November 2019, with the acquisition of Emergent Cold, then into Canada, in July 2020, acquiring Ontario Refrigerated Services Inc.

During 2018, the company acquired 24 companies, including The Yearsley Group, the UK's largest Cold Storage and Haulage supplier, maintaining its second-largest status. The company also sold minority stakes worth $700 million. Company real estate holdings were estimated at $4 billion in value.

Also in 2018, Stonepeak Partners, D1 Capital Partners, and existing backers acquired minority stakes in the company valued at $700 million.

On February 25, 2019 The Wall Street Journal reported the company's acquisition of Preferred Freezer Services LLC., its largest competitor, in a deal reportedly worth over $1 billion, expanding Lineage to the world's largest facility network, with 1.3 billion cubic feet of storage in over 200 facilities across the United States, Europe, and Asia.

On May 22, 2020 Lineage acquired the distribution assets of one of the largest independent Food Distribution companies in the country for over 100 years, Maines Paper & Food, Inc, based in Conklin, New York. That June, the company acquired Emergent Cold, Australia's largest cold-chain supplier, and New Orleans Cold Storage, with four port facilities in New Orleans, Louisiana, Houston, Texas and Charleston, South Carolina.

In July, Lineage acquired Henningsen Cold Storage, based in Portland, Oregon, with 14 cold storage facilities located mainly in Oregon and Washington, raising its employee roster to 16,000. This acquisition raised Lineage's global storage capacity to 50,660,000 m^{3} (1.789×10^{9} cu ft).

On December 1, 2020, Lineage acquired Pago, a warehousing, distribution and transport logistics provider in Poland.

In May 2021, Lineage acquired Crystal Creek e-commerce fulfillment logistics operator and its five U.S. warehouses, increasing the company's acquisitions to 72. The same month, Lineage entered the Spanish marketplace, acquiring cold storage firm Frigorificos de Navarra of Gijón, Spain from Frioastur and, in June 2021, entered the European freight industry with its acquisition of Rotterdam-based UTI Forwarding, and also acquired Kloosterboer Group in Europe, and the cold storage division of Claus Sorensen Group in Denmark. In November 2021, Lineage expanded into the Italian cold storage market with the acquisition of Kantaro SRL.

In January 2022, Lineage continued its expansion by acquiring Auscold Logistics in South Australia. In the same month, Lineage also acquired Van Tuyl Logistics, as well as individual locations from H&S Coldstores in Beneden-Leeuwen and Frigocare Rotterdam BV in Rotterdam.

In March, Lineage further expanded its network by acquiring MTC Logistics, adding nearly 38 million cubic feet of capacity and more than 113,000 pallet positions in the United States and its presence at key ports along the U.S. East and Gulf Coasts.

In April, Lineage acquired VersaCold Logistics to expand its presence in Canada. Later in May, the company acquired Mandai Link Logistics to expand into Singapore.

In August, Lineage acquired Cold Storage Nelson in New Zealand. This increased its presence in the Asia-Pacific area.

In August 2023, Lineage expanded its European network by acquiring Grupo Fuentes, a Spanish transport and cold store operator. In addition, Lineage strengthened its presence in northern Vietnam through a joint venture with SK Logistics.

In October 2023, Lineage acquired the warehousing and e-commerce assets of Burris Logistics. This deal included eight facilities across six states, adding nearly 1.3 million square feet to Lineage's network.

== Lineage Foundation for Good ==
In October 2021, Lineage announced the launch of Lineage Foundation for Good, the independent philanthropic arm of Lineage. The Foundation was created by a $3 million gift from Lineage to support the company's philanthropic efforts and support initiatives and organizations that align to its mission and work towards innovative and sustainable solutions to help reduce food waste and fight food insecurity.

In 2022, Lineage facilitated donations of over 2.7 million pounds of food products from customers, issued almost $3 million in grants, and recorded over 5,000 volunteer hours via the Lineage Foundation for Good during its first year as a public charity. The same year, Lineage Hardship Fund launched to provide assistance to team members impacted by hardships, providing over $622,000 in 2022 to support 152 team members and their families through the Lineage Foundation for Good.

The Foundation has partnered with organizations including Feeding America and Global FoodBanking Network to help provide meals to those in need. In 2023, Lineage and the Foundation sponsored DC Central Kitchen's Capital Food Fight and partnered with Forgotten Harvest to supply nearly 12,000 metro Detroit households with holiday meal boxes. Also in 2023, the Foundation announced a new partnership with Jared Goff, quarterback for the Detroit Lions and global ambassador for the Foundation, to donate meals for every touchdown the quarterback threw and to provide meals to families in need during the holidays.

== Facilities ==
Lineage is headquartered in Novi, Michigan, with additional offices around the world. It operates about 223 facilities in North America, including in 37 U.S. states, and warehouses in Australia, Belgium, Canada, China, Denmark, France, Germany, Italy, the Netherlands, New Zealand, Norway, Peru, Poland, Singapore, Spain, Sri Lanka, the United Kingdom, and Vietnam.
