= Jakarta railway =

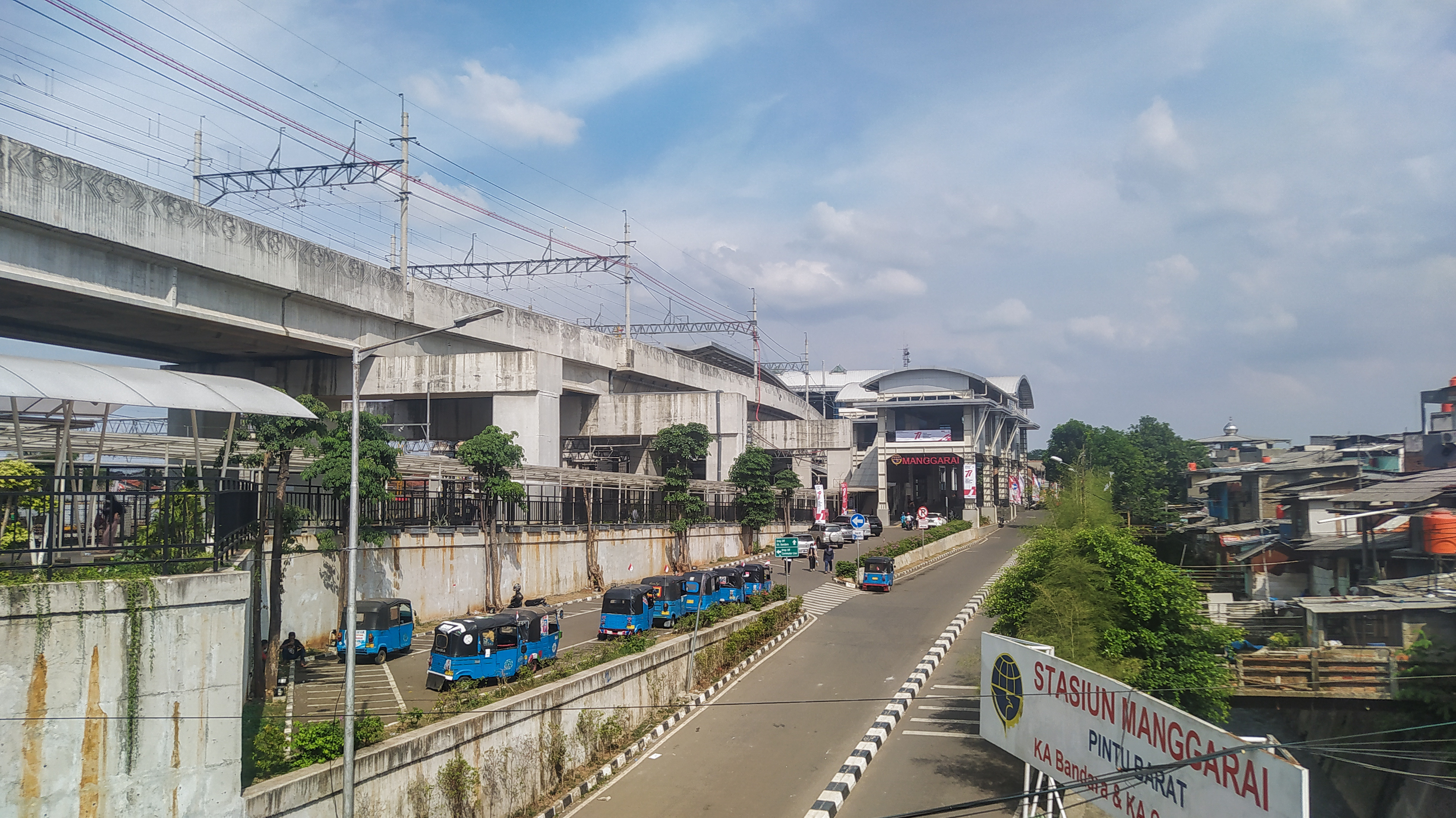
- West entrance of Manggarai, 2022

Overview
- Native name: Jalur kereta api lintas Jakarta
- Status: Operational
- Owner: Directorate General of Railways (DJKA)
- Locale: Jakarta
- Termini: Tanah Abang, Tanjung Priok, Duri; Jakarta Kota, Manggarai, Jatinegara
- Stations: 22

Service
- Type: Inter-city rail and Commuter rail
- Operator(s): PT Kereta Api Indonesia and KAI Commuter

History
- Opened: Variation

Technical
- Number of tracks: 2-4
- Track gauge: 1,067 mm (3 ft 6 in)
- Electrification: 1.5 kV DC OHC

Jakarta railway (Indonesian: Jalur kereta api lintas Jakarta) is a railway line which surrounds all administrative cities in Jakarta. This around railway line include the Operational Area I Jakarta and KAI Commuter with the province's main train stations are Gambir, Pasar Senen, Jakarta Kota, and Manggarai Station, with the exception of Halim Station, which is located on the Jakarta–Bandung high-speed rail line. This line is a collection of many railway segments serving Inter-city rail, Commuter rail, and Airport rail link, like Soekarno–Hatta Airport Commuter Line. Intercity train services on the Jakarta inner-city railway connect Jakarta and its surrounding areas with West Java (minus Bodebek), Central Java, the Special Region of Yogyakarta, and East Java. In addition, the Jakarta inner-city railway also serves commuter trains and to various destinations within the Jakarta metropolitan area and Soekarno-Hatta International Airport that located in Tangerang, Banten.

This line is being developed by the Class I Jakarta Railway Engineering Center.

== History ==
=== Jakarta–Tanjung Priok segment ===
On 12 December 1877, The newspaper "Java-bode" reported on the progress of the construction of Tanjung Priok Port. This development also included the construction of a supporting railway line from Batavia Station NIS, owned by the Nederlandsch-Indische Spoorweg Maatschappij, to Priok. At that time, subgrade measurements were carried out before the rail construction process began. According to the plan, trains on the Batavia-Priok line would only be able to operate regularly once the locomotives, trains, and carriages had arrived in the Dutch East Indies. The project was also hampered in October because workers were returning home for Eid. At that time, the rail project was already in the process of laying tracks and building bridges. In addition, an auxiliary workshop was also built at Heemradenplein, which was responsible for supplying wrought iron. On 28 March 1878, The Governor-General of the Dutch East Indies, Johan Wilhelm van Lansberge, inaugurated the port of Tanjung Priok and tested the Batavia–Priok railway. At that time, the initial departure point was not at Batavia NIS, but at Heemradenplein (now Jakarta Gudang).

The construction of this railway line was marked by negotiations between two companies that wanted to operate the railway in the Batavia area: Nederlandsch-Indische Spoorweg Maatschappij (NIS) and Bataviasche Oosterspoorweg Maatschappij (BOS). Initially, NIS stated that they weren't interested in exploiting this line, while BOS, which was still a new company, was still considering operating the route. The Colonial Government decided that the exploitation of the railway to Tanjung Priok Port also required the exploitation of the port, so the Colonial Government assigned Staatsspoorwegen, a company formed by the Colonial Government, to operate the line starting on 2 November 1885. Several attempts to make one of the two private companies the operator continued, but the state remained the manager of the line.

In 1898, The entire BOS line was acquired by SS. Soon after the acquisition was completed, a line was built from Batavia BOS Station to Tanjung Priok, as well as the line to Anyer Kidul, so that Batavia BOS was no longer considered a terminus station. The junction of these two lines met at a station and signal post, which would later be named Kampung Bandan. This connection with Tanjung Priok operated as two single tracks; then several years later it was changed to a single double track on the Kampong Bandan–Priok line. With the "duality" of Batavia stations (NIS and BOS), the operation of this system became increasingly complex, considering that the intersection, which was located close together, was an area that was very vulnerable to the danger of work accidents and difficulties for train services.

To connect the Batavia–Meester Cornelis (Jatinegara) section with Tanjung Priok, on 1 March 1904, the Kemayoran–Ancol–Tanjung Priok line was completed. This line connected Ancol with a block post called Pisangbatu (now Rajawali). Furthermore, this line was then connected to Meester Cornelis, so that this line was seen as similar to a double track, even though it was actually a pair of single tracks whose job was to separate trains heading to Batavia and those heading to Tanjung Priok.

As train traffic around Batavia grew busier, a number of renovations were undertaken on the Batavia–Tanjung Priok line. First, a new line was built leading to the newly built Tanjung Priok Station, to separate freight trains heading to the port from passenger trains no disrupting freight traffic. The new station was opened to the public on 6 April 1925, coinciding with the launch of the Priok–Meester Cornelis (Jatinegara) commuter line. The launch also commemorated SS's 50th anniversary. Second, in connection with the completion of Batavia-Benedenstad Station (now Jakarta Kota), the track intersection was removed in 1925 and a Batavia–Priok double track crossing bridge was built over the existing Batavia–Kemayoran–Meester Cornelis double track (now Kampung Bandan as a result of a study by the government and JICA). The aim was to avoid disrupting the operation of trains and KRL from Weltevreden that would continue their journey to Priok. The crossing point was 1,700 metres (5,600 ft) from the Jakarta Kota Station area.

=== Jakarta Circle-line ===
This line was also completed on 1 March 1904, together with the Tanjung Priok–Kemayoran segment, connecting Tanah Abang with the Batavia–Karawang railway line via Struiswijk (now Salemba). This line intersected with the Batavia–Buitenzorg line which was then still owned by NIS, precisely at Pegangsaan Station, originally built for military purposes. To the east from Salemba, this line branched off: one towards Kramat, and the other towards Gang Sentiong Station. Originally, this line was planned to be connected to Weltevreden Station NIS based on the law dated 15 July 1896, but was changed in connection with the acquisition of BOS by SS.

As the outskirts of Batavia developed, the central line encountered problems, as it had three intersections: with the Batavia–Buitenzorg line, the Batavia–Meester Cornelis highway; and the Nederlandsch-Indische Tramweg Maatschappij (NITM) line. After the Batavia–Buitenzorg line was taken over by the SS, a branch was created on the Batavia–Buitenzorg line between Cikini and Pegangsaan Station, heading towards Salemba. This branch wasn't important for passenger traffic; it was only intended for freight traffic. Although this connection was less well-established, efforts could be made to significantly reduce road traffic congestion at the level crossing.

As the urban area of Batavia expanded further south, and Manggarai Station was put into operation on 1 May 1918, simultaneously with the operation of the Manggarai–Meester Cornelis line; An attempt was made to build a new line running along the West Flood Canal to connect Tanah Abang with the station. This line was immediately built as a double track and became operational on 1 August 1922. After the construction of this line, the old Tanah Abang–Salemba–Kramat line was dismantled, leaving the Pegangsaan–Salemba segment. On 12 September 1923, in connection with the new spatial planning of Batavia, the Angke segment towards Batavia BOS (Batavia-Zuid) was then changed to turn right through the Amsterdam Gate, then turn right again towards the old Kampung Bandan Station.

== Service ==
=== Inter-city rail ===
Here's intercity train that passing the Jakarta railway:

==== Jakarta Gambir ====
- Parahyangan, between Gambir and Bandung
- Argo Semeru and Bima, between Gambir and Surabaya Gubeng (via Purwokerto and Yogyakarta)
- Argo Bromo Anggrek, Sembrani, and Argo Anjasmoro (facultative), between Gambir and Surabaya Pasar Turi
- Argo Lawu, Argo Dwipangga, Batavia, and Manahan, between Gambir and Solo Balapan (via Purwokerto and Yogyakarta)
- Taksaka, between Gambir and Yogyakarta (via Cirebon and Purwokerto)
- Purwojaya, between Gambir and Cilacap (via Cirebon and Purwokerto)
- Argo Muria, Argo Sindoro, and Argo Merbabu, between Gambir and Semarang Tawang
- Gunungjati, between Gambir, Cirebon, and Semarang Tawang
- Cakrabuana, between Gambir, Cirebon, and Purwokerto
- Papandayan, between Gambir and Garut (via Bandung)
- Pangandaran, between Gambir and Banjar (via Bandung)
- Brawijaya, between Gambir and Malang (via Semarang Tawang and Solo Jebres
- Gajayana, between Gambir and Malang (via Purwokerto and Yogyakarta)
- Pandalungan, between Gambir and Jember (via Cirebon and Surabaya Pasar Turi)

==== Jakarta Pasar Senen ====
- Blambangan Express, between Pasar Senen and Ketapang (via Cirebon and Surabaya Pasar Turi)
- Bangunkarta, between Pasar Senen and Jombang (via Purwokerto and Yogyakarta)
- Bogowonto, Progo, and Gajahwong, between Pasar Senen and Lempuyangan
- Gumarang, Kertajaya, Airlangga, and Dharmawangsa Express, between Pasar Senen and Surabaya Pasar Turi
- Fajar/Senja Utama Solo, Jaka Tingkir, and Mataram, between Pasar Senen and Solo Balapan
- Gaya Baru Malam Selatan and Jayakarta, between Pasar Senen and Surabaya Gubeng (via Purwokerto)
- Tawang Jaya and Menoreh, between Pasar Senen and Semarang Poncol
- Tawang Jaya Premium, between Pasar Senen and Semarang Tawang
- Tegal Bahari, between Pasar Senen and Tegal
- Fajar and Senja Utama Yogya, between Pasar Senen and Yogyakarta
- Brantas, between Pasar Senen and Blitar (via Semarang Poncol and Solo Jebres)
- Singasari, between Pasar Senen and Blitar (via Purwokerto)
- Majapahit and Matarmaja, between Pasar Senen and Malang (via Semarang and Solo Jebres)
- Sawunggalih and Kutojaya Utara (Jakarta Kota) (ceased for regular), between Pasar Senen and Kutoarjo (via Purwokerto)
- Bengawan, between Pasar Senen and Purwosari (via Purwokerto)
- Cikuray, between Pasar Senen and Garut (via Bandung)
- Serayu, between Pasar Senen and Purwokerto (via Kiaracondong)
- Madiun Jaya, between Pasar Senen and Madiun (via Purwokerto and Yogyakarta)

=== Commuter rail ===
The most commuter rail serving the Jakarta metropolitan area, like KRL Commuterline:

- Bogor Line, between Jakarta Kota, Nambo, and Bogor
- Tangerang Line, between Duri and Tangerang
- Cikarang Line, loop line
- Rangkasbitung Line, between Tanah Abang and Rangkasbitung (will extended to Serang under the planning stage in 2026)
- Tanjung Priok Line, between Jakarta Kota and Tanjung Priok
- Soekarno–Hatta Airport Commuter Line, between SHIA and Manggarai

=== Freight train ===
Here's freight train that passing the Jakarta railway:

- Overnight train Service, between Kampung Bandan and Surabaya Pasar Turi (Northern Parcel), between Kampung Bandan and Malang via Purwokerto (Middle Parcel)
- Coal Cargo train, between Nambo and Cigading
- Container cargo train, between Tanjung Priok-Kampung Bandan-Krenceng and Kalimas-Benteng-Lemahabang

== See also ==
- Rajawali–Cikampek railway
- Cikampek–Padalarang railway
- Jakarta Kota–Anyer Kidul railway
- Krenceng–Merak railway
- Bogor–Padalarang–Kasugihan railway

== Bibliography ==
- de Bruyn Kops, A.L. (1940). "De Ringbaan in en om Batavia". Spoor- en Tramwegen. 13 (22): 435–439.
