= Beach City International Stadium =

Multifunction concert venue in Jakarta, Indonesia

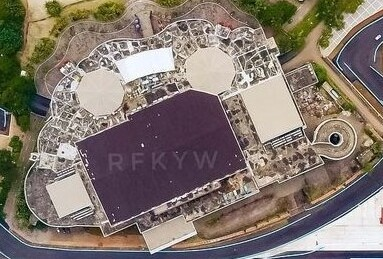
- Top view of the building
- Full name: Ancol Beach City International Stadium
- Former names: Sound Of Djakarta Entertainment
- Location: Pademangan, North Jakarta, Indonesia
- Owner: PT. Pembangunan Jaya Ancol Tbk
- Operator: Mata Elang (2012–2014)
- Capacity: 15,000
- Public transit: Jakarta International Stadium

Construction
- Groundbreaking: 2009
- Opened: 1 January 2012
- Closed: 26 June 2014
- Reopened: 1 October 2022

Beach City International Stadium (formerly known as Mata Elang International Stadium between 2012 and 2014) is an indoor arena located at Ancol Dreamland, Jakarta, Indonesia. The venue is located inside Ancol Beach City, a lifestyle and entertainment center.

== History ==
The venue opened in early 2012 with the name Mata Elang International Stadium.

Due to a conflict between Mata Elang management and Ancol Beach City management, MEIS was closed on 26 June 2014 until further announcement. Henry Yosodiningrat, one of the owners of the arena, said the venue's lease will end in March 2037. The venue did, however, reopen in fall 2022 with a new name: Beach City International Stadium.

Linda C Banowati, Operational Director of Mata Elang management, said they are in the process of building two new stadiums outside Ancol Beach City. One will be located in Jakarta, and one in Bali. Both of these new stadiums are expected to be finished in 2017. However, this was never realized due to closure of first MEIS.

== Access ==
BCIS is located approximately 5 minutes from Tanjung Priok port and 25 minutes from Soekarno–Hatta International Airport. The nearest KRL Commuterline station to the venue is Jakarta International Stadium (Tanjung Priok Line) via the Ancol–JIS skybridge. Meanwhile, the nearest Transjakarta bus station is the Ancol station (Corridor 5).

== Entertainment events ==
=== Mata Elang International Stadium (2012–2014) ===
Year	Date	Performer(s)	Concert	Ref.
2012	3 March	Roxette	Charm School – The World Tour	
2012	10 April	Sum 41	Screaming Bloody Murder Tour	
2012	21 April	Dream Theater	A Dramatic Turn of Events Tour	
2012	27 April	Super Junior	Super Show 4	
2012	28 April	Super Junior	Super Show 4	
2012	29 April	Super Junior	Super Show 4	
2012	1 June	New Kids on the Block – Backstreet Boys	NKOTBSB Tour	
2012	30 June	MBLAQ	The BLAQ% Tour	
2012	4 August	Jeremy Camp	We Cry Out Tour	
2012	5 August	Jeremy Camp	We Cry Out Tour	
2012	8 September	Erwin Gutawa Orchestra, XO-IX, Wali, Ungu, Armada, Smash, 7icons, Blink, Indah Dewi Pertiwi, Syahrini	Konser Persembahan 22 Tahun SCTV Teristimewa	
2012	12 October	Big Bang	Alive Galaxy Tour	
2012	13 October	Big Bang	Alive Galaxy Tour	
2012	2 November	Noah	Noah Born to Make History – The Greatest Session of History	
2012	3 November	Jaejoong	Kim Jae Joong 1st Fanmeeting in Jakarta	
2012	9 November	David Foster	David Foster & Friends – Hitman Return Tour 2012	
2012	30 November	Jennifer Lopez	Dance Again World Tour	
2012	8 December	2PM	Global Tour 2012 – 'What time is it?	
2012	15 December	Sting	Back to Bass Tour	
2012	16 December	Guns N' Roses	Appetite for Democracy	
2013	11 January	Noah, Nidji, Wali, Gigi, Agnes Monica, Sherina, Afgan, Vidi Aldiano, Judika, Cakra Khan, Trio Lestari, S4, Erwin Gutawa Orchestra, Andi Rianto	Konser Raya 18 Tahun Indosiar Warnai Indonesia	
2013	1 June	Super Junior	Super Show 5	
2013	2 June	Super Junior	Super Show 5	
2013	15 June	G-Dragon	One of a Kind World Tour	
2013	16 June	G-Dragon	One of a Kind World Tour	
2013	17 August	Mikha Tambayong	Proklamasi Kemerdekaan Republik Indonesia	
2013	24 August	Wali, Noah, Ungu, Jamrud, Armada, Setia Band, Siti Badriah, Zaskia Gotik, Syahrini, Judika, Afgan, SM*SH, Aorea, Cherrybelle, JP Millenix	Malam Puncak HUT SCTV Ke-23: 2 Dunia 3 Cerita	
2013	31 August	Infinite	One Great Step	
2013	14 September	Girls' Generation	Girls & Peace World Tour	
2013	12 October	Jay Chou	2013 Opus Jay Concert	
2014	11 January	Wali, Geisha, Ungu, SM*SH, Noah, Setia Band, Afgan, Armada, Rossa, Inul Daratista, Cherrybelle, Cakra Khan, Maudy Ayunda, Coboy Junior, etc	Konser Raya 19 Tahun Indosiar: Aks19emilang	
2014	8 March	Alter Bridge	2014 Alter Bridge Australian Tour	
2014	24 March	Bruno Mars	The Moonshine Jungle Tour	
2014	4 June	Taylor Swift	The Red Tour	
2014	8 June	2NE1	All or Nothing World Tour	
2014	22 June	Shinee	Shinee World III	

=== Beach City International Stadium (2022–present) ===
Year	Date	Performer(s)	Concert	Ref.
2022	29 October	Clean Bandit, Rossa, D'Masiv, Weird Genius	Scream or Dance	
2022	30 October	Clean Bandit, Rossa, D'Masiv, Weird Genius	Scream or Dance	
2022	12 November	Stray Kids	Maniac World Tour	
2022	13 November	Stray Kids	Maniac World Tour	
2023	4 February	Exo-SC	Back To Back Fancon	
2023	17 March	Kygo	Kygo in Jakarta	
2023	18 March	Arctic Monkeys	The Car Tour	
2023	7 July	HONNE	2023 Asia Tour	
2023	14 July	Putri Ariani, Titi DJ, Raisa, Lesti Kejora, Tiara Andini, Brisia Jodie, Merry Riana	Konser Wanita Hebat	
2023	29 July	The Boyz	THE BOYZ 2ND WORLD TOUR: ZENERATION	
2023	9 August	Tomorrow X Together	Act Sweet Mirage Tour	
2023	29 September	One Ok Rock	Luxury Disease Asia Tour	
2023	30 September	One Ok Rock	Luxury Disease Asia Tour	
2023	8 October	Charlie Puth	The Charlie Live Experience	
2023	14 October	Rex Orange County	Live in Asia 2023	
2023	15 October	Rex Orange County	Live in Asia 2023	
2023	18 October	The Corrs	The Corrs Live in Jakarta	
2023	21 October	Barasuara, Isyana Sarasvati, Ardhito Pramono, Pamungkas	ASEAN–Korea Music Festival – ROUND in Indonesia	
2023	22 October	Barasuara, Isyana Sarasvati, Ardhito Pramono, Pamungkas	ASEAN–Korea Music Festival – ROUND in Indonesia	
2023	10 November	Bring Me the Horizon	Church of Genxsis	
2023	11 November	Bring Me the Horizon	Church of Genxsis	
2024	4 May	Young K, Boy Story, Day6, Chen, Xiumin, Xikers	Saranghaeyo Indonesia 2024	
2024	11 May	Niall Horan	The Show: Live on Tour	
2024	24 August	Aespa	Synk: Parallel Line	
2024	7 September	Red Velvet	Happiness: My Dear, ReVe1uv	
2024	14 September	Super Junior	Super Show Spin-Off: Halftime	
2024	9 October	LANY	A Beautiful Blur: The World Tour	
2024	10 October	LANY	A Beautiful Blur: The World Tour	
2024	19 October	Day6	Forever Young World Tour	
2024	15 November	Lisa	Lisa Fan Meetup in Asia 2024	
2024	22 November	2NE1	Welcome Back Tour	
2024	23 November	2NE1	Welcome Back Tour	
2024	30 November	Fujii Kaze	Best of Fujii Kaze 2020–2024	
2024	07 December	Chanyeol	2024 Chanyeol Live Tour: City Scape in Asia	
2024	14 December	DPR Ian, DPR Cream, DPR Artic	The Dream Reborn World Tour	
2025	17 January	Cigarettes After Sex	X's World Tour	
2025	8 February	The Corrs	From Jakarta with Love	
2025	14 February	Niki	Buzz World Tour	
2025	16 February	Niki	Buzz World Tour	
2025	18 October	Plave	2025 Plave Asia Tour: Dash Quantum Leap	
2025	15 November	Colde, W24, Urban Zakapa	Saranghaeyo Indonesia 2025	
2025	29 November	Rich Brian	Where is My Head?	
2026	3 February	Bryan Adams	Roll with the Punches	
2026	7 February	Dream Theater	An Evening With Dream Theater – 40th Anniversary Tour 2026	

== See also ==
- List of indoor arenas

Other concert venues in Greater Jakarta:

- Gelora Bung Karno Stadium
- Istora Gelora Bung Karno
- Indonesia Arena
- Indonesia Convention Exhibition
- Jakarta International Expo
- Jakarta International Convention Center
- The Kasablanka
- Sentul International Convention Center
