= Ancol railway station =

Railway station in Indonesia

TP03 Ancol Station Stasiun Ancol
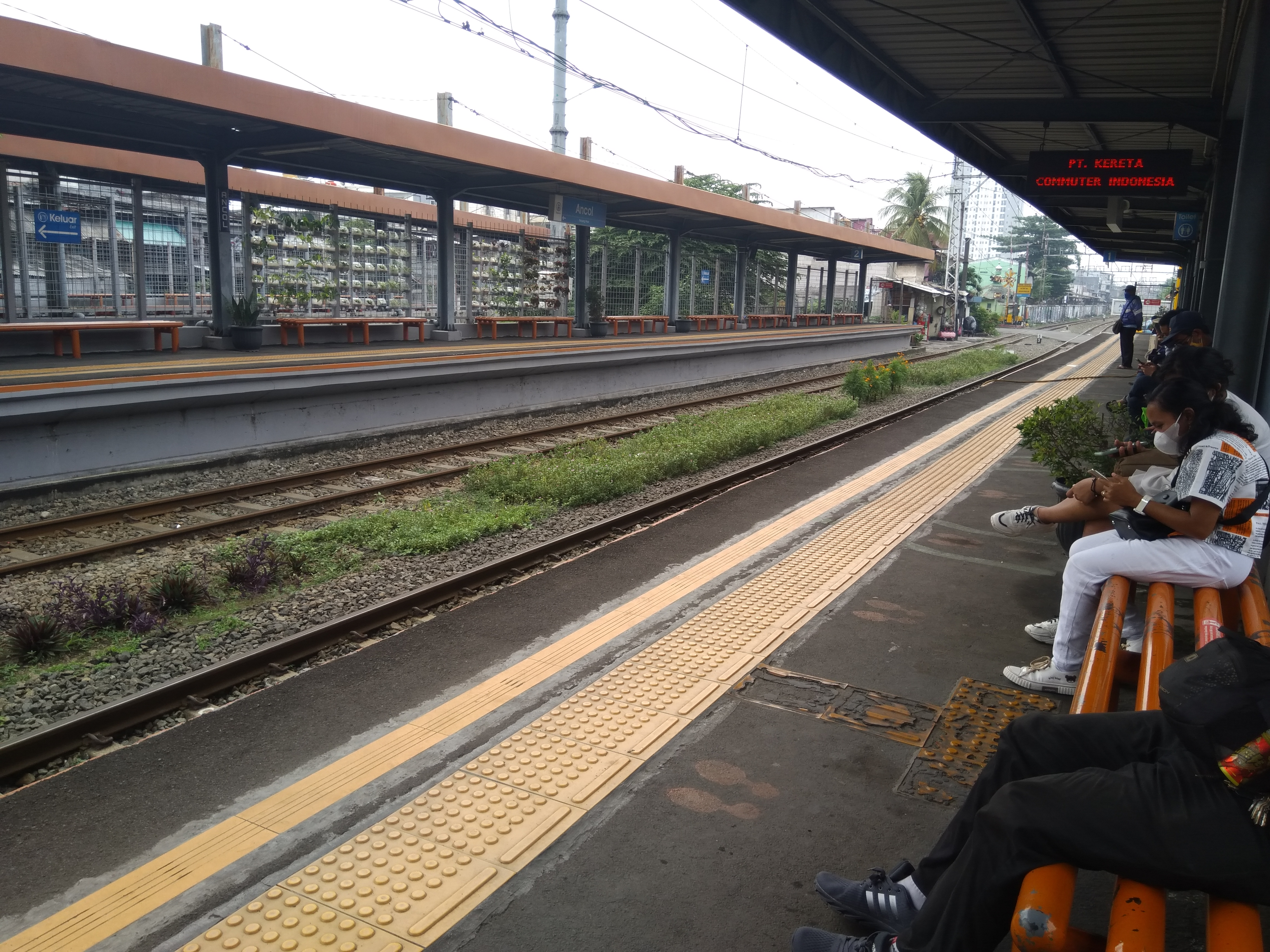

General information
- Location: Jl. R.E. Martadinata, West Pademangan, Pademangan, North Jakarta; Indonesia
- Coordinates: 6.1279873°S 106.84513709999999°E
- Elevation: +3 m (9.8 ft)
- Owner: Kereta Api Indonesia
- Operator: Kereta Commuter Indonesia
- Line: Tanjung Priok Line
- Platforms: 2 side platforms 1 island platform
- Tracks: 4

Construction
- Structure type: Ground
- Parking: Unavailable
- Accessible: Available

Other information
- Station code: AC
- Classification: Class III

Services
Preceding station		Following station
Kampung Bandan towards Jakarta Kota	Tanjung Priok Commuter Line	Tanjung Priok Terminus
Kampung Bandan towards Jakarta Kota	Tanjung Priok Commuter Line	Jakarta International Stadium One-way operation
Location
- Location within Jakarta

Ancol Station (AC) is a railway station located in West Pademangan, Pademangan, North Jakarta, Indonesia. The station is situated on a railway junction where a line from Jatinegara connects to the Tanjung Priuk–Jakarta Kota railway. It is serving the Pink line KRL Commuterline from Jakarta Kota to Tanjung Priuk.

In the past, there were railway sidings heading to the Pasoso–Pertamina Cilincing depot from Ancol station but those have been closed since the 1990s.

Starting from 25 June 2016, Ancol Station was reactivated to serve KRL Commuterline trips from Jakarta Kota to Tanjung Priok.

== Building and layout ==
This station has four railroad tracks that have no turning tracks at all; consists of a double track with a double track on the north side leading from Jakarta Kota-Kampung Bandan and a double track on the south side leading from Rajawali.

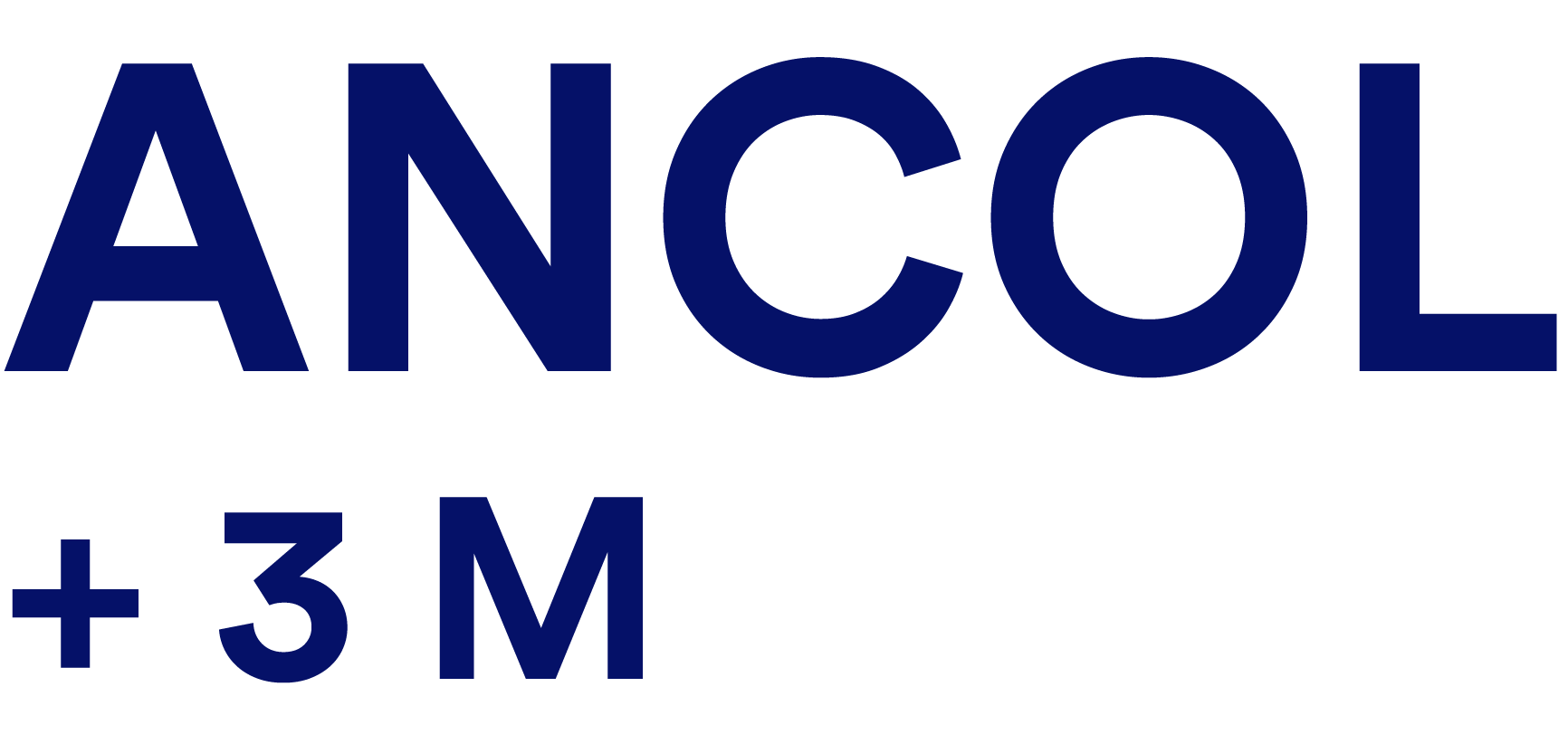
TP03
G
Main building
P

Platform floor

Side platform, the doors are opened on the right side
Line 1
← (Kampung Bandan) Tanjung Priok Line to Jakarta Kota
Line 2
Tanjung Priok Line to Tanjung Priuk (Tanjung Priuk) →
Side platform, the doors are opened on the right side (only on line 2)
Line 3
Container trains
Line 4
Container trains
Side platform

== Services ==
=== KRL Commuter Line ===
- Pink Line, Destination of Jakarta Kota and Tanjung Priuk

== Supporting transportation ==
Type	Route	Destination
Mikrotrans Jak Lingko	JAK-88	Tanjung Priok–Ancol (via Budi Mulya–Gunung Sahari–Lodan Raya)
Mikrolet (share taxi)	M15	Tanjung Priok–Jakarta Kota Station (via Lodan Raya–Cengkeh)
Mikrolet (share taxi)	M15A	Tanjung Priok–Jakarta Kota Station (via Gunung Sahari–Mangga Dua Raya)

Preceding station	Kereta Api Indonesia	Following station
Kampung Bandan towards Jakarta Kota	Jakarta Railway; JAKK–TPK	Jakarta International Stadium towards Tanjung Priok
Terminus	Jakarta Railway; AC–JICT	Pasoso towards JICT
Terminus	Jakarta Railway; AC–RJW	Rajawali; Terminus
