= Kampung Bandan railway station =

Railway station in Indonesia

C07 TP02 Kampung Bandan Station Stasiun Kampung Bandan
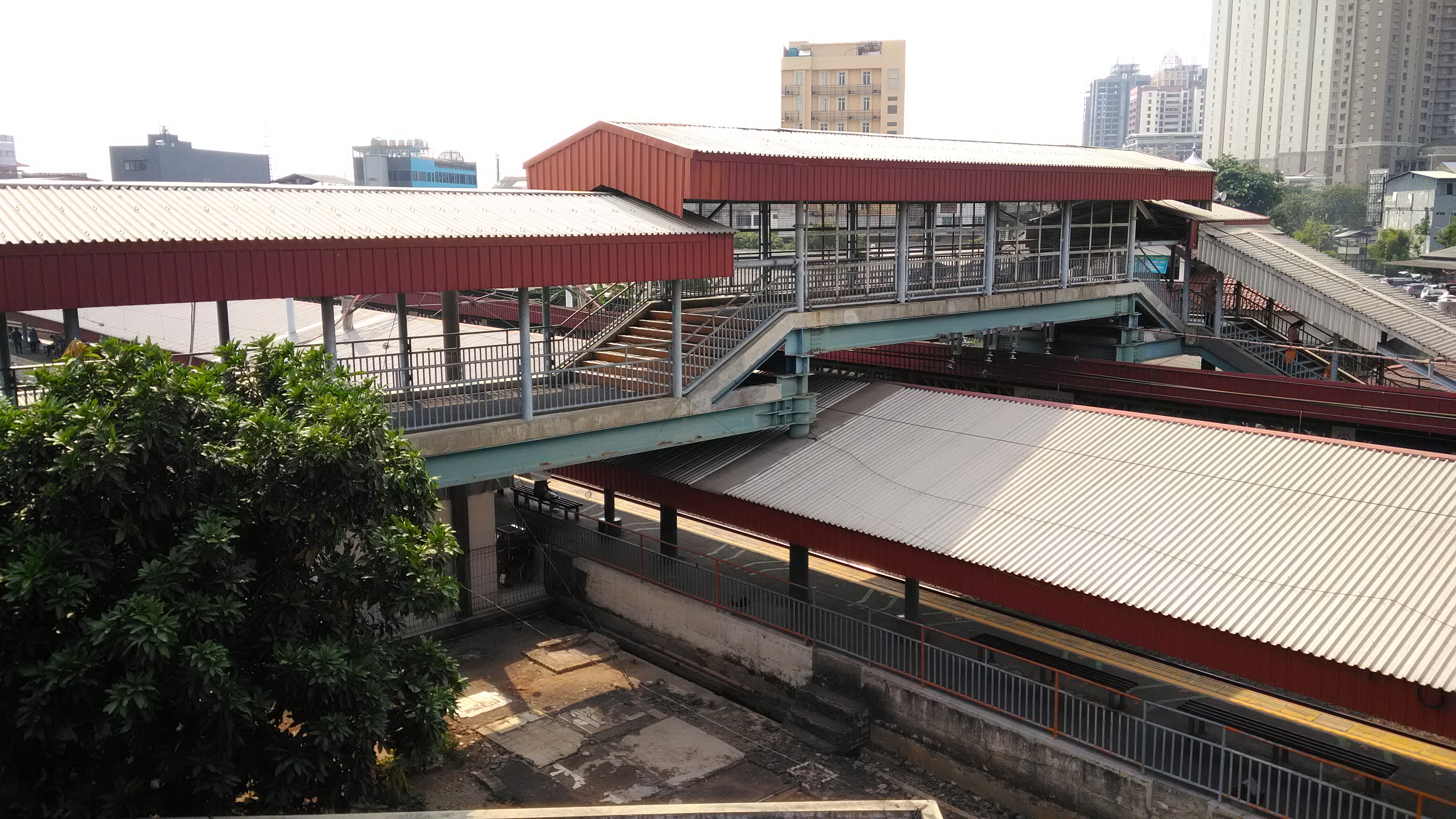
- Kampung Bandan Station

General information
- Location: Ancol, Pademangan; North Jakarta 14430; Jakarta; Indonesia
- Coordinates: 6.1328°S 106.8285°E
- Elevation: +3 m (9.8 ft)
- System: Commuter line station
- Owner: Kereta Api Indonesia
- Operator: KAI Commuter
- Lines: Cikarang Loop Line; Tanjung Priuk Line
- Platforms: 1 island platform 3 side platforms
- Tracks: 5
- Connections: Pademangan

Construction
- Structure type: Ground and embankment (Grade-separated rail-rail crossing)
- Parking: Available
- Accessible: Available

Other information
- Station code: KPB • 0486 • BANDAN
- Classification: II

History
- Electrified: May 1927

Services
| Preceding station | | Following station |
|---|---|---|
| Terminus | Commuter Line Cikarang | Rajawali towards Bekasi or Cikarang via Pasar Senen |
| Jakarta Kota Terminus | Commuter Line Cikarang Branch towards Jakarta Kota; Only for midnight and dawn schedules | Rajawali towards Bekasi or Cikarang via Pasar Senen |
| Terminus | Commuter Line Cikarang | Angke towards Bekasi or Cikarang via Manggarai |
| Jakarta Kota Terminus | Tanjung Priok Line | Ancol towards Tanjung Priok |
Location
- Location within Jakarta

Kampung Bandan Station (KPB) is a railway station located in North Jakarta. This station is located close to WTC Mangga Dua. The station has elevated tracks with embankment and ground-level tracks. The elevated level tracks are used by trains between Jakarta Kota and Tanjung Priuk, as the Tanjung Priuk Line. The ground tracks are used by trains going to Cikarang as the Cikarang Loop Line. This station has been hit by floods numerous times.

There was once a plan to build apartments on PT KAI's land near this station and they would be integrated with the KRL Commuterline and the Jakarta MRT. These apartements will be occupied by residents who used to live on the banks of the railroad tracks around this station. To the north of the station on the upper side, there is also the Jakarta Kota Train Depot, only 200 meters to Jakarta Kota Station.

On 17 December 2015, the upper line of this station was fully operational, serving the Tanjung Priuk–Jakarta Kota route.

== Building and layout ==
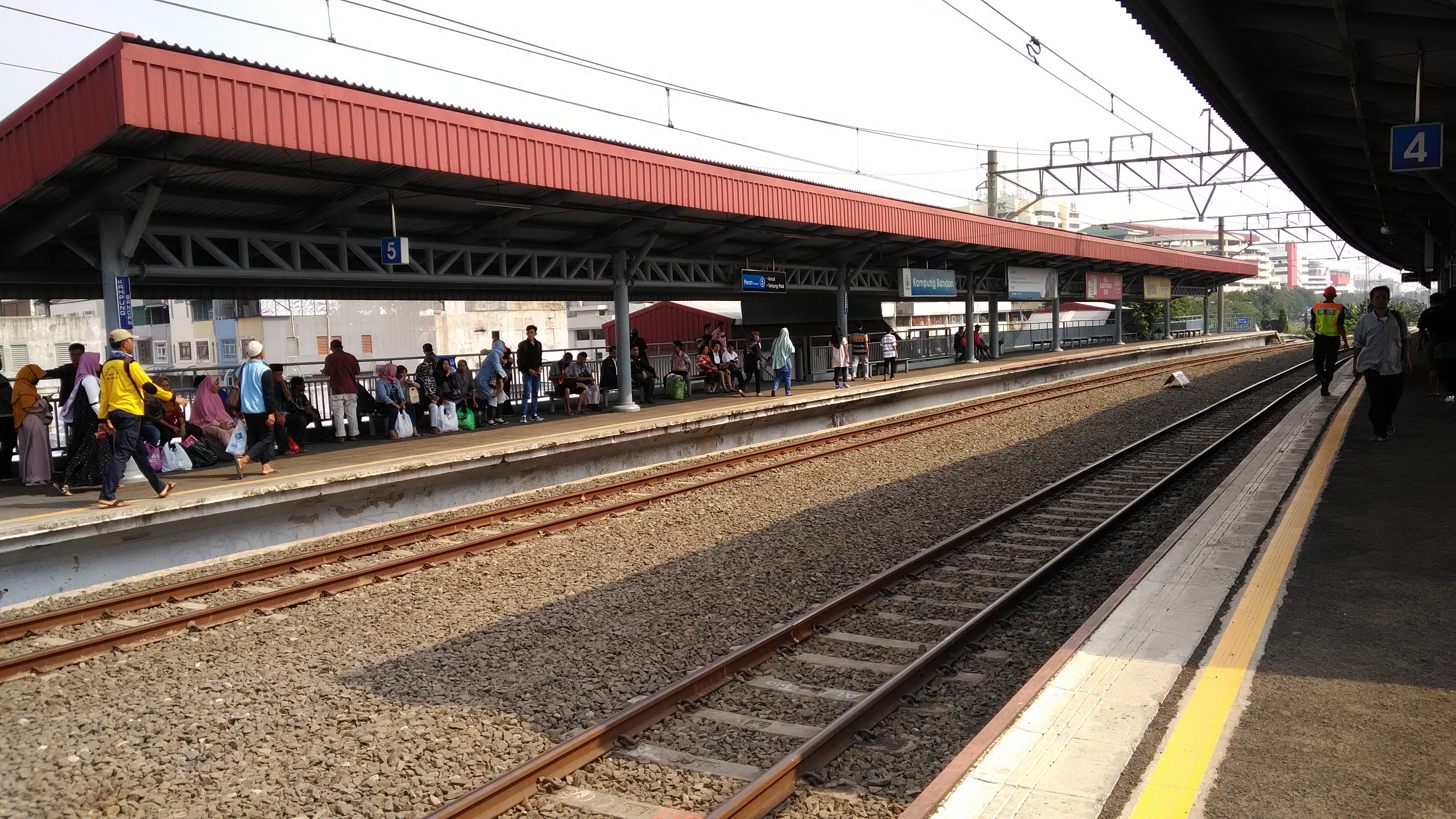
The upper line platform of the Kampung Bandan station

The station has an upper line and lower replacing the old station which was located slightly to the north. There are two elevation figures for this station, since the installation of the 2020 version of the station nameplate, namely +3 m for the lower side and +5 m for the upper side. The lower line goes to Pasar Senen, while the upper line goes to Ancol.

The former entrance was located on the north side towards Ancol, but since the development of the south side (Mangga Dua, Harco, etc.) was so rapid, the north gate was not active at all. Both gates of Kampung Bandan Station can be used for passenger access.

C07 TP02
| Upper line | Side platform, the doors are opened on the right side |
| Upper line | Line 7 | ← (Jakarta Kota) | Tanjung Priok Line to Jakarta Kota |
| Upper line | Line 8 | | Tanjung Priok Line to Tanjung Priuk | (Ancol) → |
| Upper line | Side platform, the doors are opened on the right side |
| Lower line | Side platform, the doors are opened on the right side |
| Lower line | Line 4 | ← (Angke) | Cikarang Loop Line (counterclockwise loop) to Cikarang via Manggarai |
| Lower line | Line 5 | | Cikarang Loop Line (clockwise loop) to Cikarang via Kemayoran | (Rajawali) → |
| Lower line | Side platform, the doors are opened on the right side |
| Lower line | Line 6 | ← (Jakarta Kota) | Buffer stop |

== Services ==
The following is a list of train services at the Kampung Bandan Station.

=== Passenger services ===
- KAI Commuter
  - Cikarang Loop Line (Full Racket)
    - to Cikarang (counter-clockwise via Tanah Abang and Manggarai)
    - to Cikarang (clockwise via Kemayoran)
  - Cikarang Loop Line (Half Racket), to Cikarang (via Tanah Abang)
  - Tanjung Priuk Line, to Jakarta Kota and Tanjung Priuk

== Supporting transportation ==
| Type | Station | Route | Destination |
|---|---|---|---|
| TransJakarta | Pademangan | List of Transjakarta corridors#Corridor 5 | Ancol–Kampung Melayu |
| TransJakarta | Pademangan | | Tanjung Priok–Bundaran Senayan |
| TransJakarta | N/A | JAK-33 (MikroTrans Jak Lingko) | Pulo Gadung bus terminal–Taman Kota Intan |
| TransJakarta | N/A | JAK-88 (MikroTrans Jak Lingko) | Tanjung Priok bus terminal–Ancol (via R.E. Martadinata–Budi Mulya) |
| JR Connexion (Perum DAMRI) | N/A | Kota Wisata | Kota Wisata–ITC Mangga Dua |
| JR Connexion (Perum DAMRI) | N/A | Jababeka | Hollywood Junction–Dunia Fantasi |
| Mikrolet (Share taxis) | N/A | M15A | Tanjung Priok bus terminal–Jakarta Kota station (via Jl. Mangga Dua Raya) |

== Incidents ==
- On 30 October 2020, a KRL Commuterline EMU derailed at the Kampung Bandan Station. This drop causes the train to tilt. This incident resulted in the Bogor-Jatinegara KRL only ending its journey at Angke Station, the Bekasi-Jakarta Kota KRL ending its journey at Kemayoran Station, and the Jatinegara-Bogor KRL being diverted to Manggarai Station. The evacuation took an estimated five hours from 11.30 WIB and there were no casualties.
