= Jakarta International Stadium railway station =

Railway station in Indonesia

TP04 Jakarta International Stadium Station Jakarta International Stadium
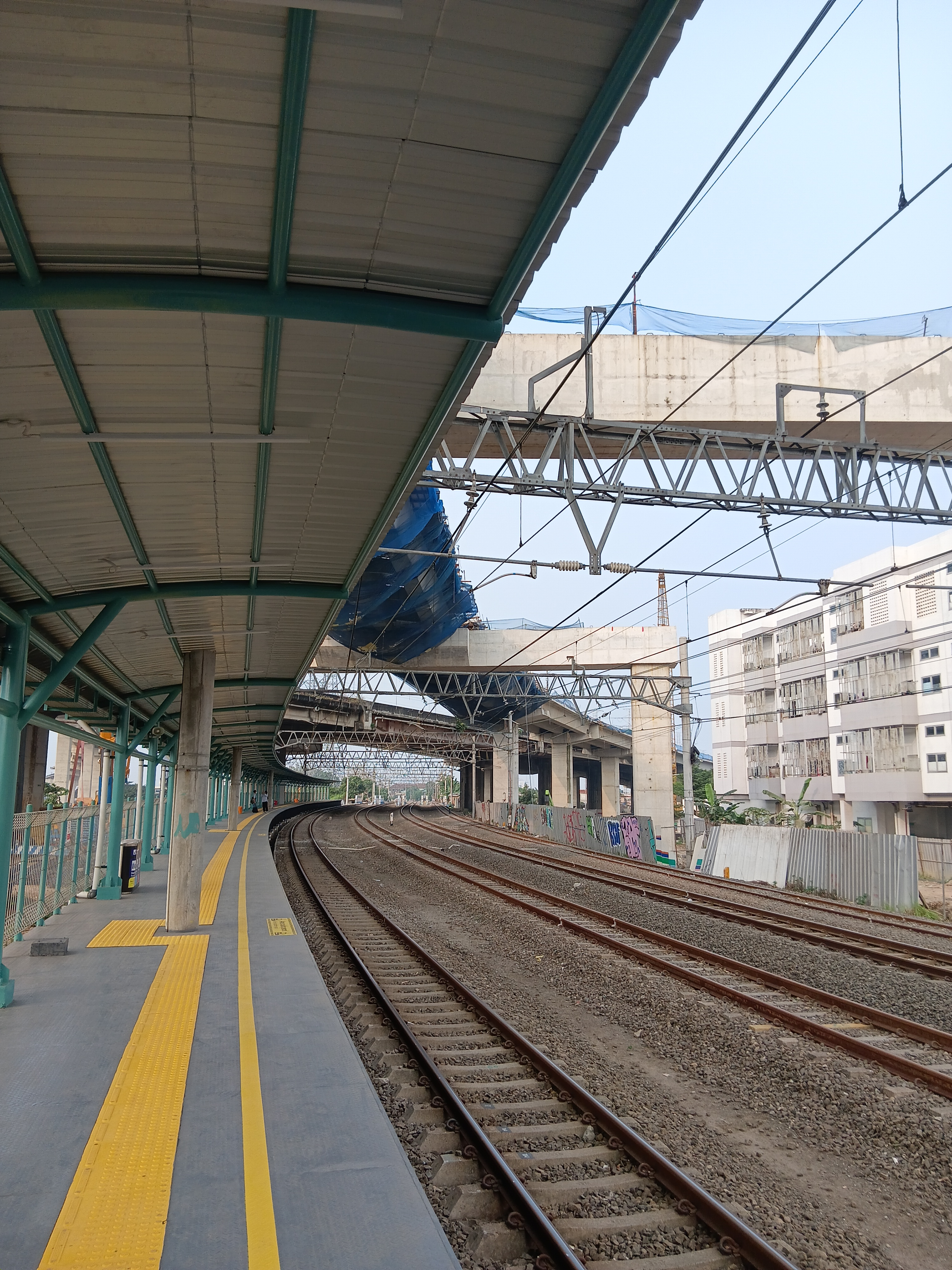
- Platform area

General information
- Other names: JIS Station
- Location: R.E. Martadinata St., Papanggo, Tanjung Priok, North Jakarta, Jakarta, Indonesia
- Coordinates: 6.1229°S 106.8608°E
- Owner: Kereta Api Indonesia
- Operator: KAI Commuter
- Line: Tanjung Priok Line
- Platforms: Single side platform
- Tracks: 4
- Connections: Jakarta International Stadium

Construction
- Structure type: At-grade
- Parking: No
- Cycle facilities: No
- Accessible: No

Other information
- Station code: JIS

History
- Opened: 22 June 2026

Services
Preceding station		Following station
Ancol towards Jakarta Kota	Tanjung Priok Commuter Line	Tanjung Priok One-way operation
Tanjung Priok Commuter Line towards Tanjung Priok does not stop here
Location

Jakarta International Stadium Station or JIS Station is a railway station in Papanggo, Tanjung Priok, North Jakarta, Indonesia, located adjacent to the association football stadium with the same name to the south. Built in a temporary single side platform, it only serves westbound KRL Commuterline Tanjung Priok Line trains from Tanjung Priok to Jakarta Kota. It is connected to the stadium and Ancol Dreamland via skybridge.

JIS Station has been included in the masterplan of Jakarta International Stadium, where the station is planned to be a large-sized building, adequate to accommodate the 82.000-seater stadium. Realizations of the railway station began in 2023 by providing temporary building east of the planned permanent building but faced delays due to a double-decker elevated highway construction. On 22 June 2026, JIS Station was officially inaugurated and began operational with its temporary building.

== History ==
In 2021, the Ministry of Transportation discussed with PT. Jakarta Propertindo (JakPro), primary contractor of the Jakarta International Stadium, and Kereta Api Indonesia (KAI) about a new railway station in front of the stadium, which is located between existing Ancol and Tanjung Priok stations. The stadium is considered too far from the two existing stations, so a new station at a distance less than 1 kilometre from the stadium is required for convenient transit access and reduce potential traffic congestion.

In March 2022, KAI began to clean-up the Tanjung Priok–Jakarta Kota railway from illegal, semi-permanent buildings, including those in front of JIS where the settlers voluntarily left and demolished the buildings in October of the same year. Later, in February 2023, KAI began the construction of the temporary building of JIS rail station, which is located below the Jakarta Inner Ring Road northern section (Harbour Road) viaduct. The construction reached 30% as of July 2023 and was expected to operate during the 2023 FIFA U-17 World Cup in November. However, the station construction was halted and delayed due to a new double-decker elevated highway project above the existing one called Harbour Road 2.

Construction of the temporary building resumed in 2025, but the permanent one has yet to be started. On 22 June 2026, JIS Station was officially inaugurated by Jakarta Governor Pramono Anung, in conjunction with the city's 499th anniversary. The station was inaugurated along with its skybridge access that connects the Jakarta International Stadium and Ancol Dreamland. Because only one side platform was built, JIS Station only serves westbound trains towards Jakarta Kota, forcing passengers from Ancol to take detour at Tanjung Priok. KAI Commuter said that the permanent building of the station will serve both directions of trains and accommodate roughly 1.000 to 2.000 passengers daily.

== Building and layout ==
JIS Station is an infill station with four tracks: the first line is for westbound trains to Ancol, the second for eastbound trains to Tanjung Priok, the third and fourth lines are for container trains. It is only accessible via skybridge that connects the stadium and Ancol Dreamland. The station is currently operational with temporary building, consists of an unused container box for the amenities (e.g. toilets) and the single side platform made of steel structure. Because it only has one side platform, eastbound trains from Ancol do not stop at this station, thus forcing passengers to take detour at Tanjung Priok to aboard the westbound train and alight at JIS.

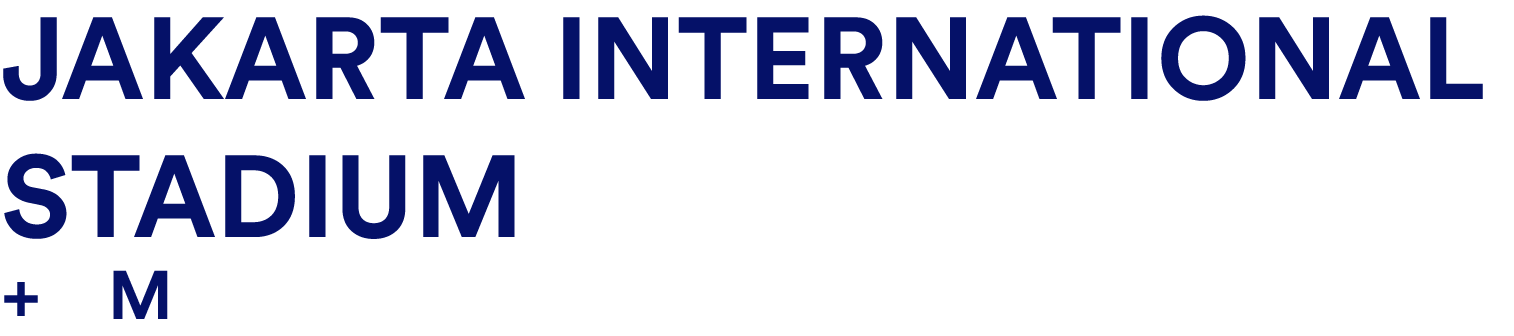
TP04
1
Skybridge access to stadium and Ancol
G
Main building
P

Platform level

Side platform
Line 1
← (Ancol) Tanjung Priok Line to Jakarta Kota
Line 2
Straight track to Tanjung Priok
Line 3
Container trains
Line 4
Container trains

== Services ==
- Passenger trains
  - Tanjung Priok Line to Jakarta Kota

== Supporting transportation ==
System	Route	Destination	Notes
Transjakarta	List of TransJakarta corridors#Corridor 14	JIS–Senen	Via Jakarta International Stadium BRT station to the west of the stadium
Transjakarta	(non-BRT)	JIS–Kelapa Gading LRT station	Via Jakarta International Stadium BRT station to the west of the stadium
Transjakarta	(non-BRT)	JIS–Monumen Nasional	Via Jakarta International Stadium BRT station to the west of the stadium
Transjakarta	(non-BRT)	Tanjung Priok–Senen via JIS	
Transjakarta	JAK 77 (Mikrotrans)	Tanjung Priok–Jembatan Item	
Transjakarta	JAK 88 (Mikrotrans)	Tanjung Priok–Ancol Barat	
Transjakarta	JAK 89 (Mikrotrans)	Tanjung Priok–Taman Kota Intan	
Transjakarta	JAK 90 (Mikrotrans)	Tanjung Priok–Rusun Kemayoran	
Transjakarta	JAK 118 (Mikrotrans)	Taman Waduk Papanggo–Kota Tua	
Transjakarta	JAK 120 (Mikrotrans)	JIS–Muara Angke	

== Gallery ==
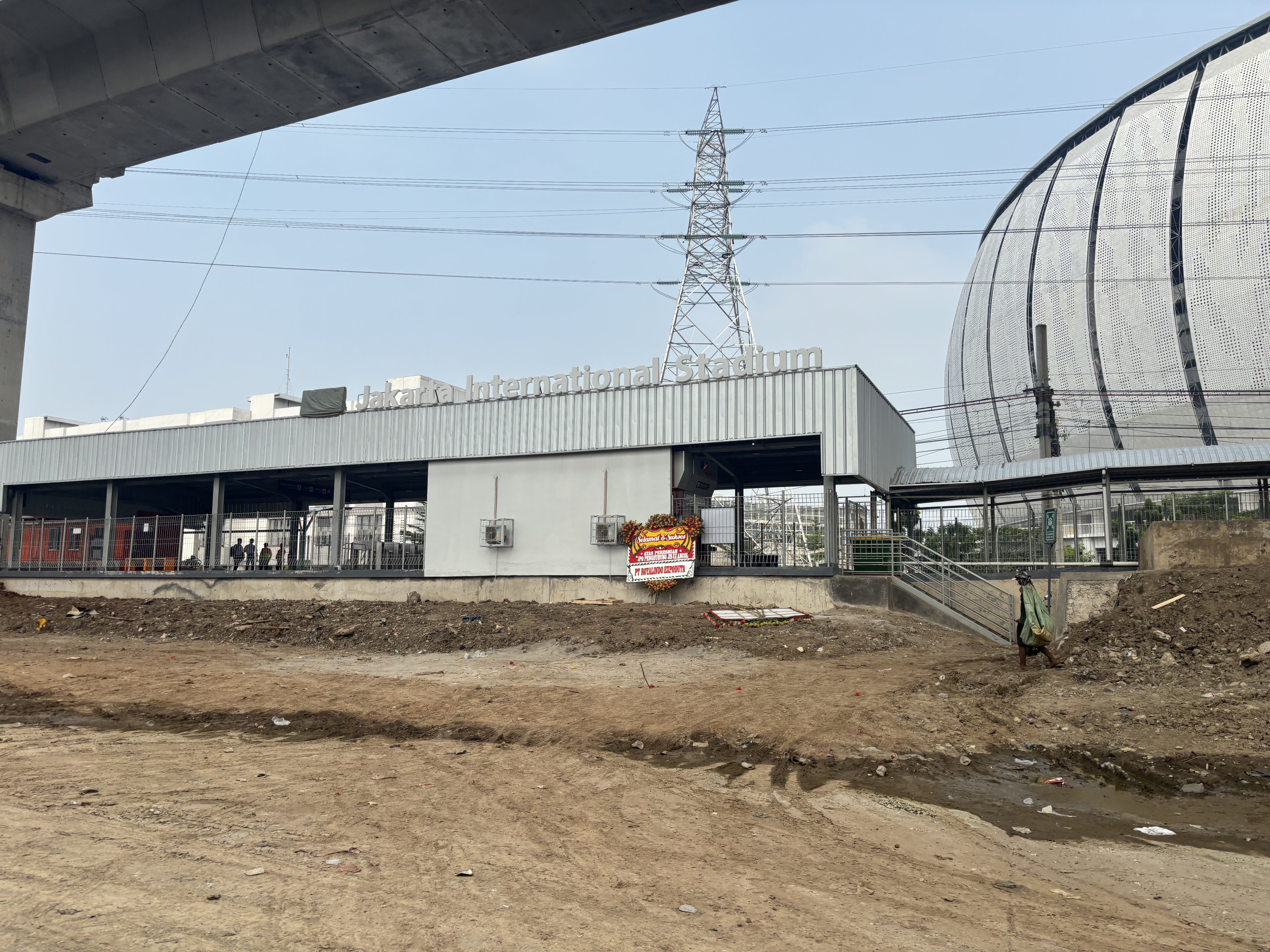
Frontage of the current temporary building

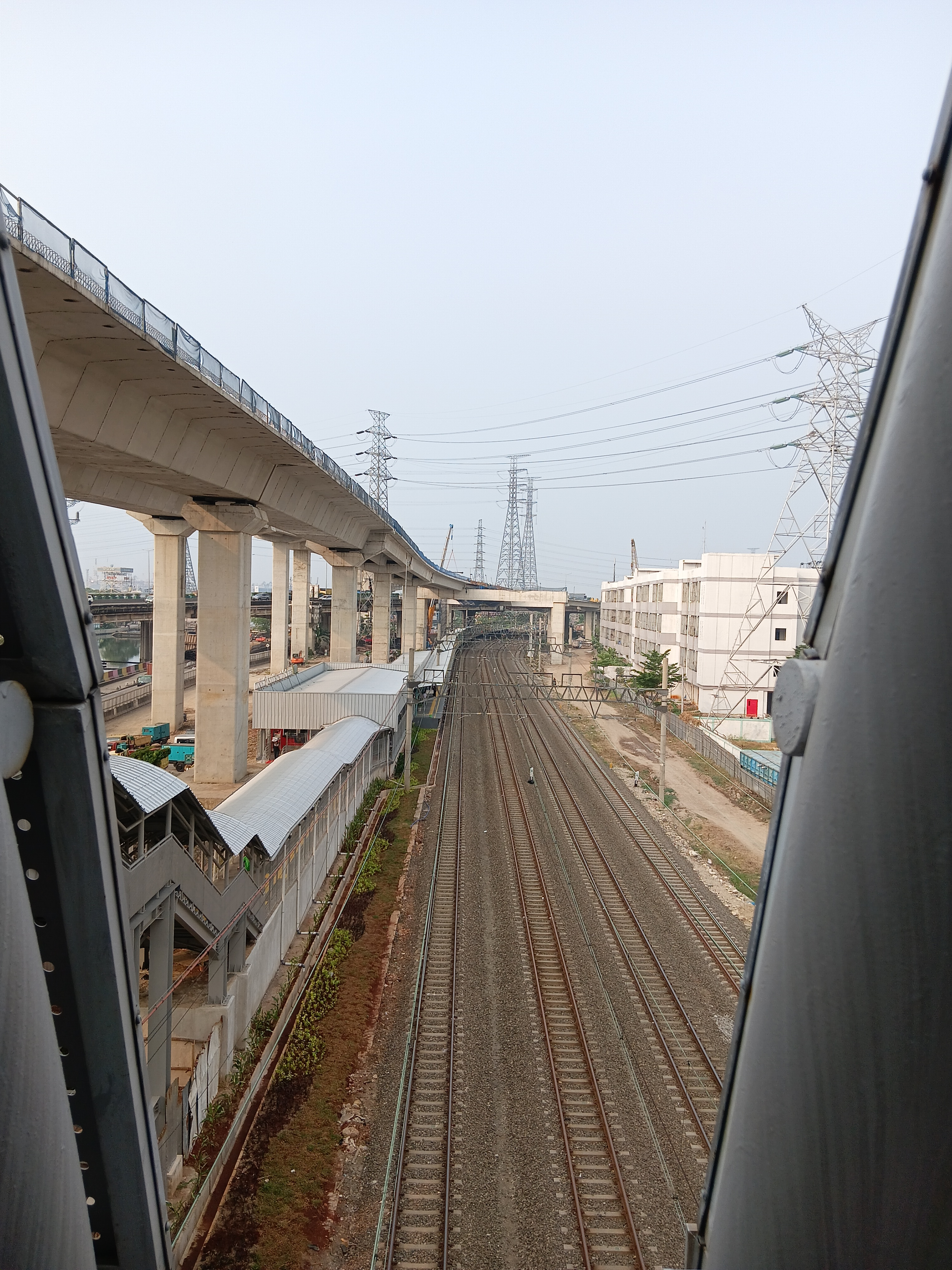
The emplacement seen from above the skybridge

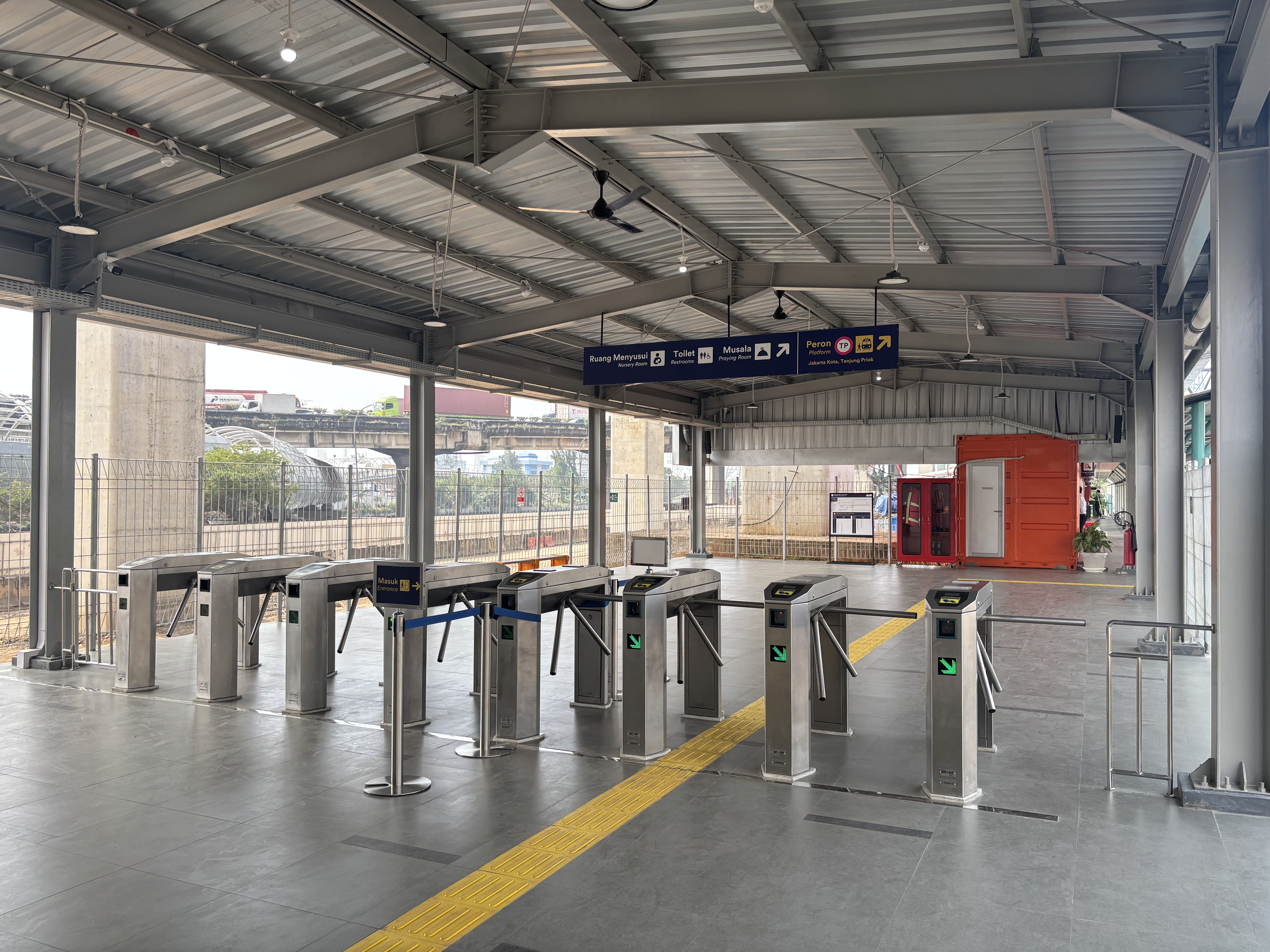
Turnstiles at the entrance

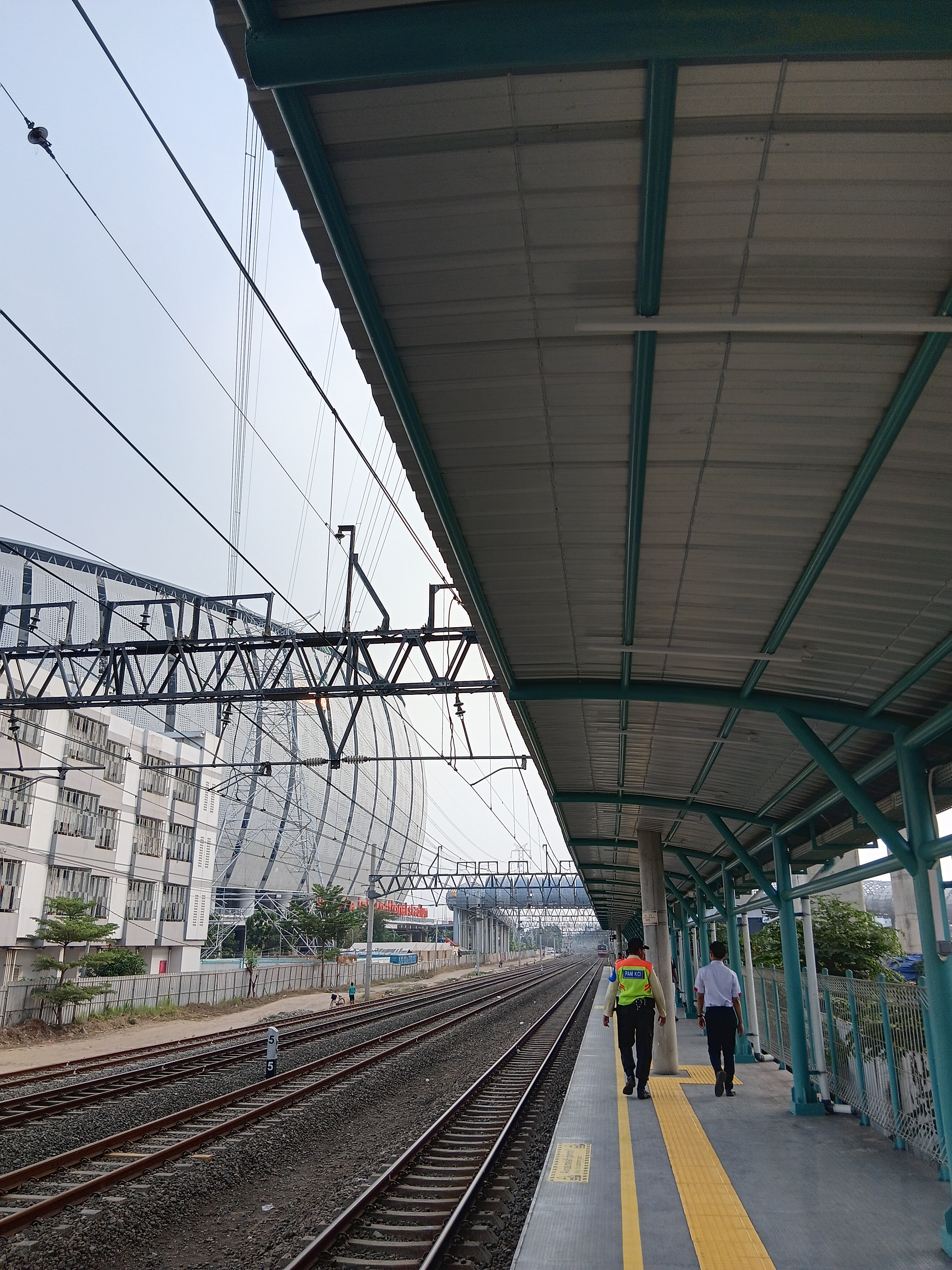
Platform looking west towards the Jakarta International Stadium

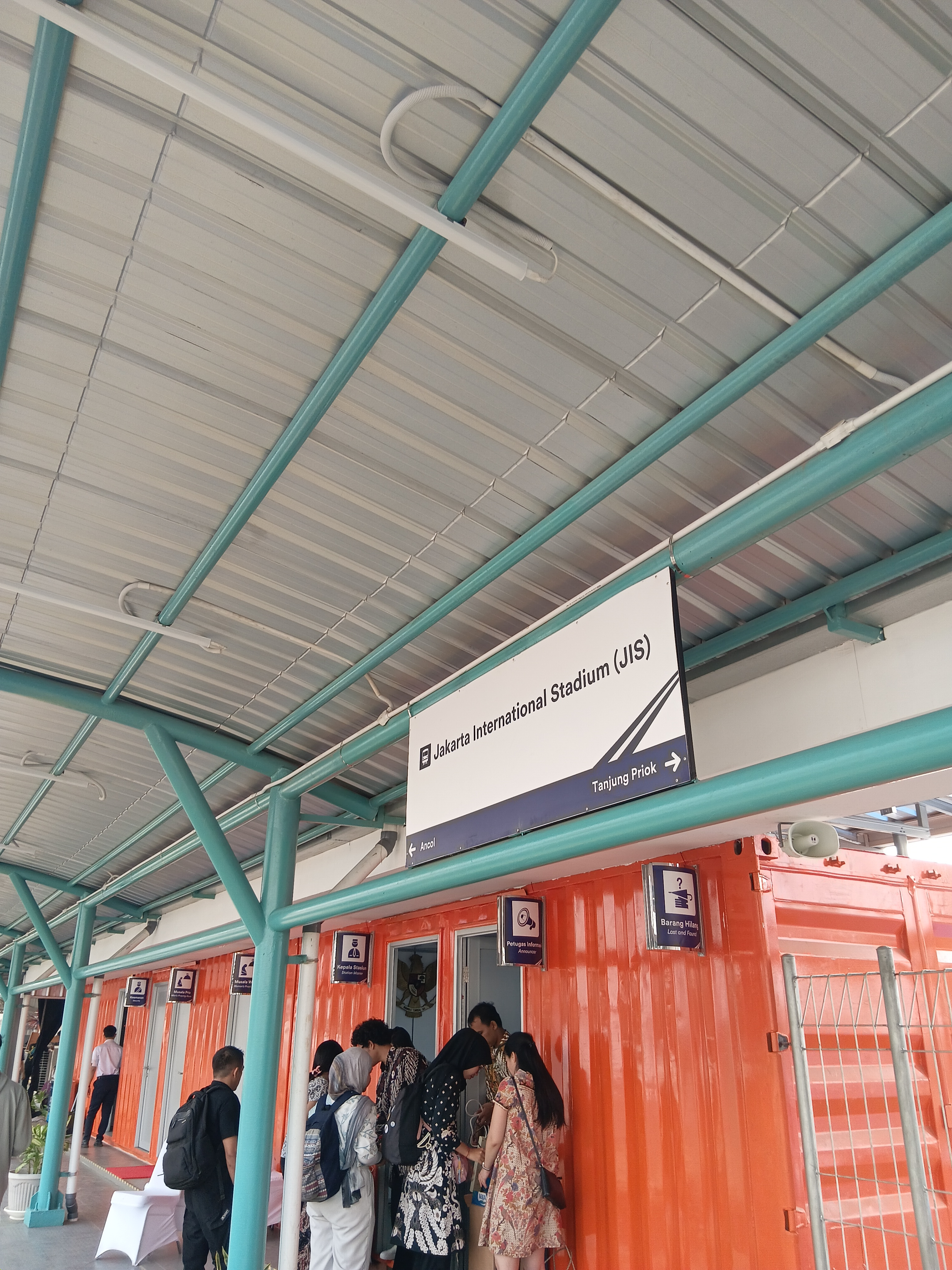
Name sign and amenities on a container box
