= KAI Commuter Tanjung Priok Line =

Commuter rail line in Indonesia

Tanjung Priok Commuter Line Tanjung Priok Line
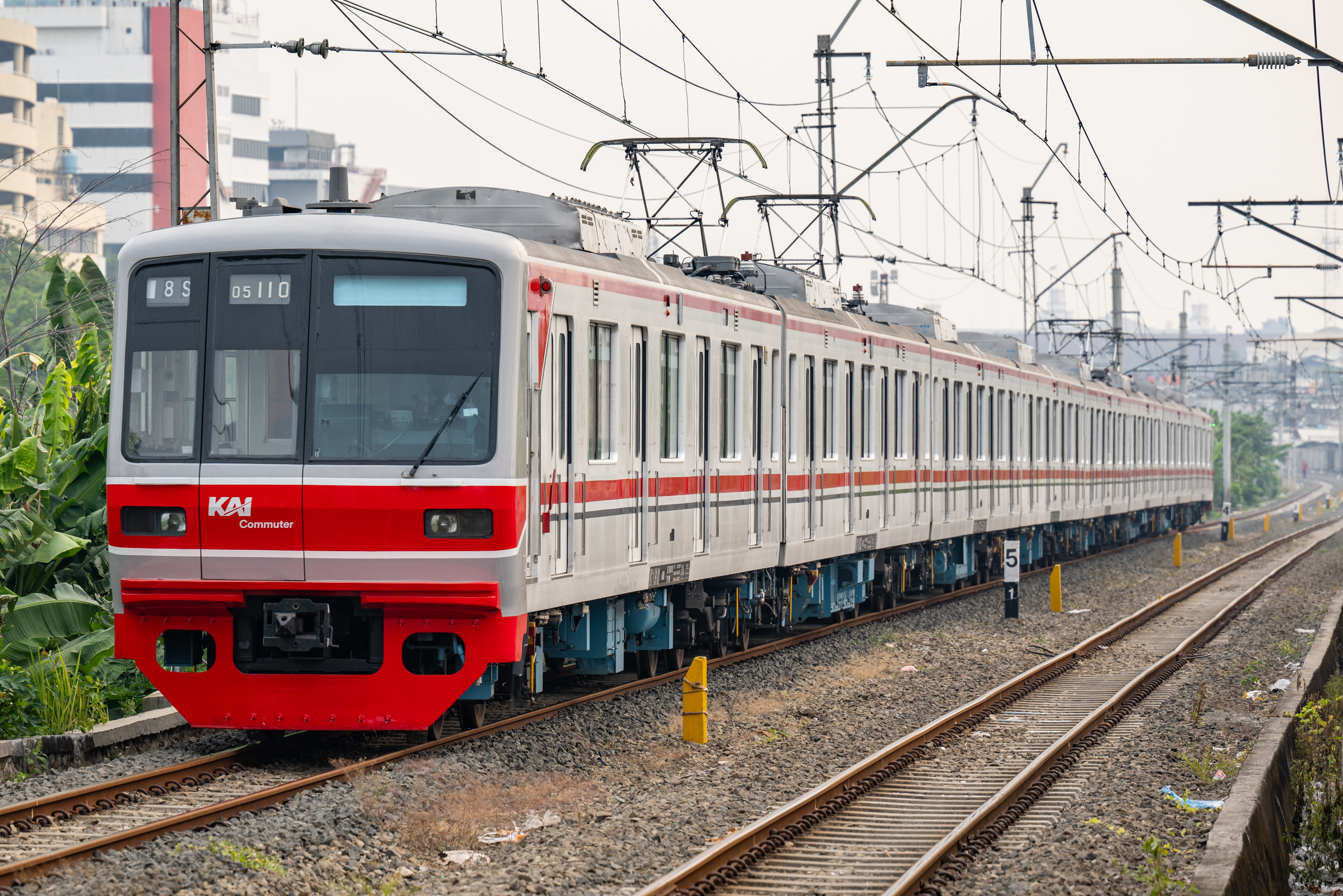
- A Tokyo Metro 05 series EMU entering Kampung Bandan station

Overview
- Status: Operational
- Owner: Kereta Api Indonesia
- Locale: West Jakarta; Central Jakarta; North Jakarta
- Termini: Jakarta Kota; Tanjung Priuk
- Stations: 5
- Website: http://www.krl.co.id/

Service
- Type: Commuter rail
- System: KRL Commuterline
- Services: 1
- Operator: KAI Commuter
- Depot(s): Bukit Duri, Depok, and Bogor
- Rolling stock: Tokyo Metro 6000 series 205 series EA203 series

History
- Opened: 1885 (original); 1924-1925 (electrified); 1929 (Note: relocated from Batavia Noord to Batavia Zuid); 5 December 2011 (as 'Pink Line'); 21 December 2015 (fully operated)

Technical
- Line length: 15.4 km (9.6 mi)
- Number of tracks: Double-track; Quadruple-track
- Character: At-grade
- Track gauge: 1,067 mm (3 ft 6 in)
- Electrification: 1,500 V DC overhead line

The Tanjung Priok Line (also known as KRL Commuterline Jakarta Kota–Tanjung Priok), officially the Tanjung Priok Commuter Line, is a commuter rail line in Indonesia, operated by PT Kereta Commuter Indonesia. The line connects Jakarta Kota station in West Jakarta and Tanjung Priuk station in North Jakarta. On maps and diagrams, the line is shown using the colour "pink" ( ). Covering a distance of only 8.115 kilometres, the pink line is the shortest line in the Jakarta KA Commuter system, and serves mostly as the connecting feeder line between Jakarta Kota station (red line) and Kampung Bandan station (blue line). The Pink Line traces its origins back to a railway line built from 1883 to 1885 during the Dutch colonial era, to connect the city of Jakarta to Tanjung Priok Port. It was also one of the earliest railway lines in Indonesia to be electrified starting from 1925.

Initially, Ancol was not opened at the time the line was fully operational. This station was finally used as a stop from 25 June 2016.

== Route patterns ==
Being the shortest line in the network, it is covered by a single service serving the entire line.

Service pattern	Route	Listed as	Stations served
Jakarta Kota–Tanjung Priuk	Towards Tanjung Priuk: Jakarta Kota → Kampung Bandan → Tanjung Priuk; Towards Jakarta Kota: Tanjung Priuk → Kampung Bandan → Jakarta Kota	Towards Tanjung Priuk: "Tanjung Priuk"; Towards Jakarta Kota: "Jakarta Kota"	4 stations from Jakarta Kota to Tanjung Priuk (bidirectional)

The segment between Kampung Bandan and Jakarta Kota is shared with a minority service of half-racket, counterclockwise Cikarang Loop Line that terminates at Jakarta Kota. However, this service is very rarely available and is not acknowledged on the map, making it relatively obscure and leaving Tanjung Priok Line as the main feeder between the two stations.

== Stations ==
The distance table of Commuterline stations.

Station		Distance (km)		Transfers/ Notes		Location	
Code	Name	From previous station	From Jakarta Termini	Transfers/ Notes		Location	
TP01 B01	Jakarta Kota	—	0.0	KAI Commuter Bogor Line	Terminal station. Interchange station to Kota (U/C) Kota	West Jakarta	Jakarta
TP02 C07	Kampung Bandan	1.364	1.364	KAI Commuter Cikarang Loop Line	Interchange station to Mangga Dua (planned)	North Jakarta	Jakarta
TP03	Ancol	2.185	3.549			North Jakarta	Jakarta
TP04	Jakarta International Stadium				Normal stop (westbound) Pass-through (eastbound) Jakarta International Stadium JIS (planned)	North Jakarta	Jakarta
TP05	Tanjung Priuk	8.195	15.373		Terminal station. Tanjung Priok Tanjung Priok Bus Terminal (via short walk) Tanjung Priok Port	North Jakarta	Jakarta

== Rolling stock ==
- Ex-Tokyo Metro 05 series (2010–present)
- Ex-Tokyo Metro 6000 series (2015-present)
