= Pademangan =

District of North Jakarta, Indonesia

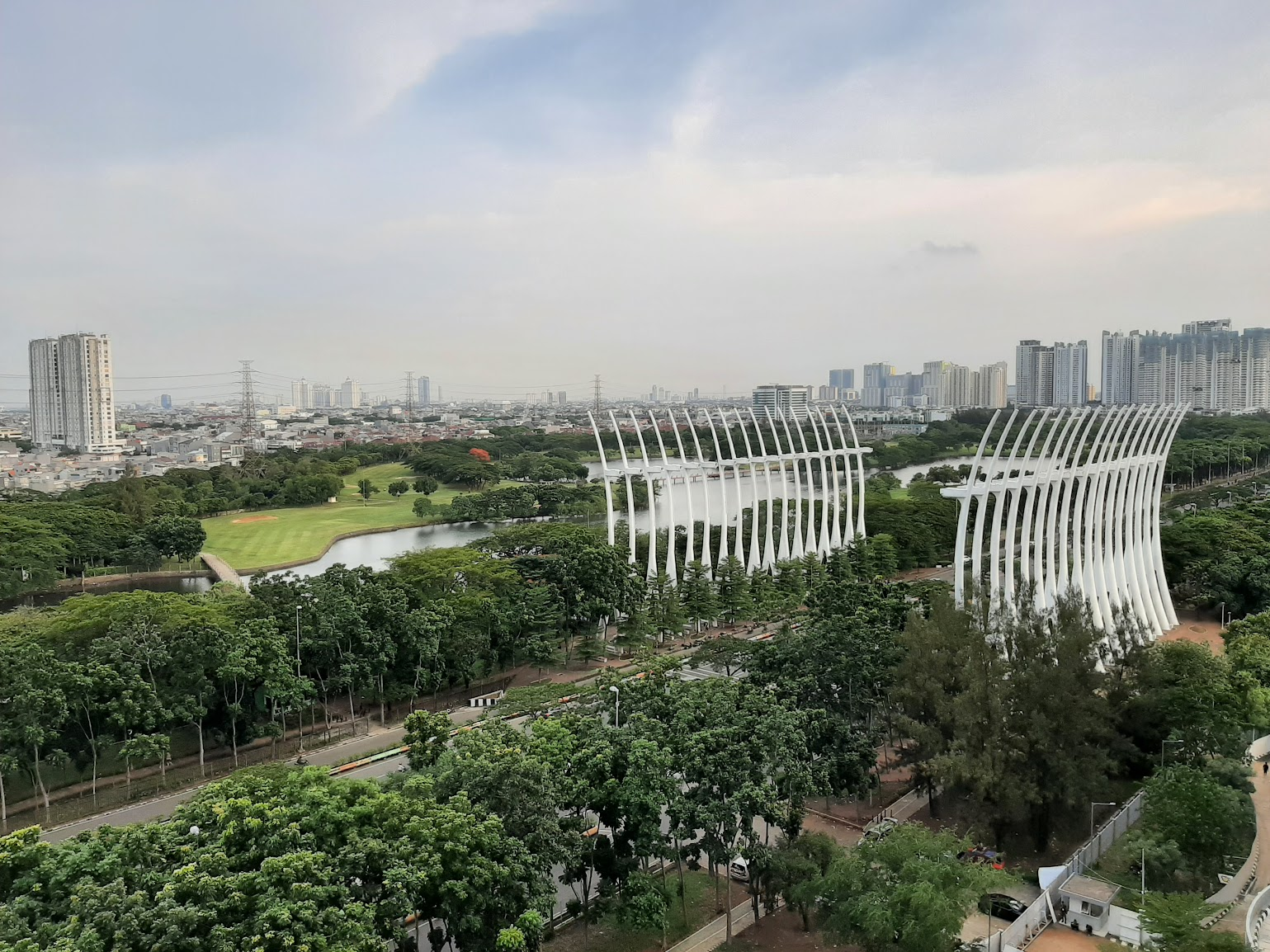
Aerial view of Pademangan at Benyamin Suaeb street

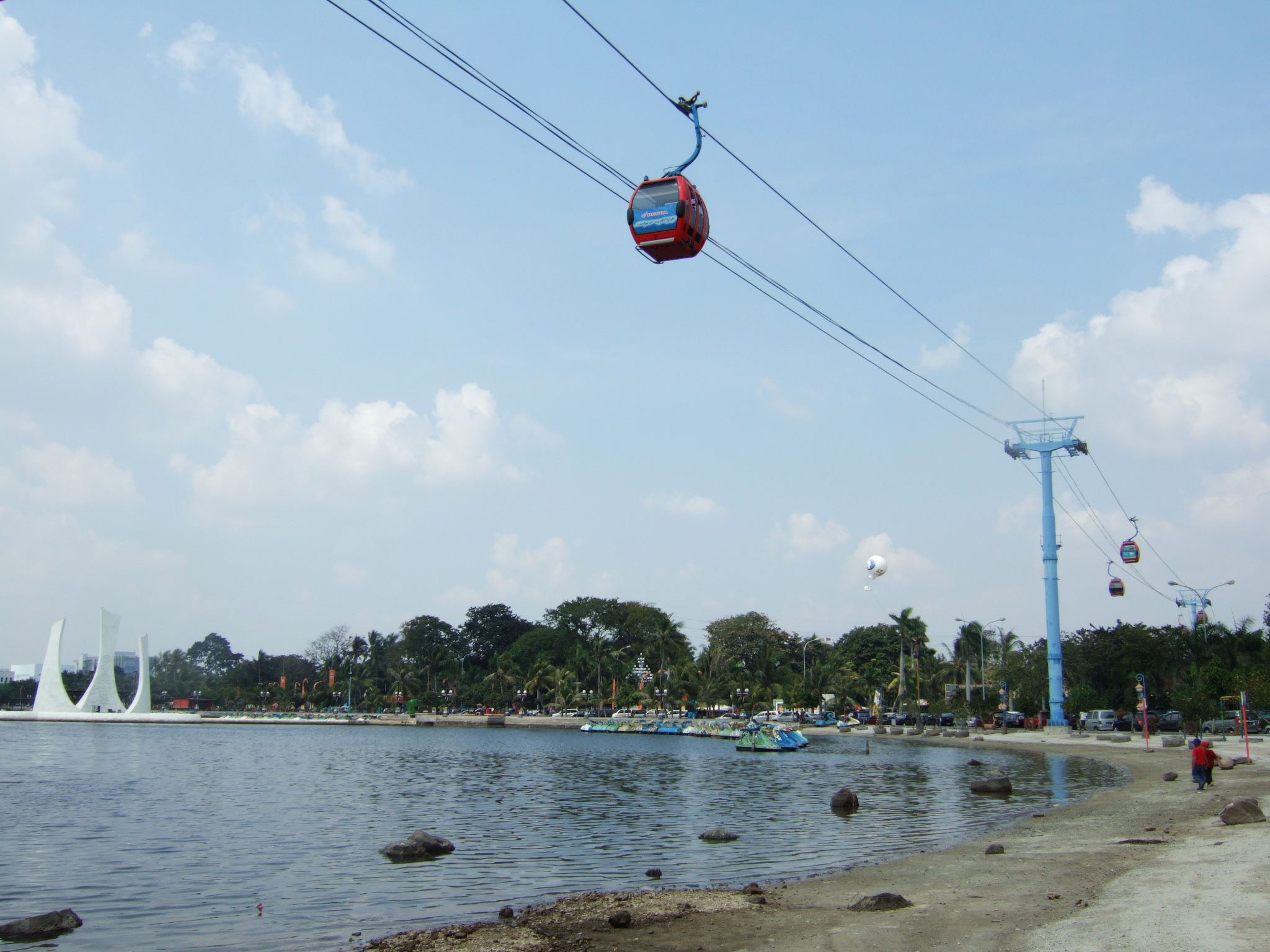
Ancol Jakarta Bay City.

Pademangan is a port-associated district (kecamatan) of North Jakarta Administrative City, Indonesia. It stretches from the Sunda Kelapa Harbour in the west to the western area of Tanjung Priok Harbor in the east. Geographically, it is a plain with an average height of 75 centimeters above the high tide sea level.

== Boundaries ==
Pademangan is bordered on the west by Sunda Kelapa Harbor, on the south by Kemayoran Railway, on the east by the Kali Ancol and Kali Japat canals, and on the north by Jakarta Bay.

== Kelurahan (Administrative Villages) ==
The district of Pademangan is divided into three Kelurahan / Administrative Villages:

- Pademangan Timur - area code 14410
- Pademangan Barat - area code 14420
- Ancol - area code 14430
Map of Pademangan within North Jakarta. Click for broader map and to enable varied magnification.

== History ==
Settlement of the 19th century was similarly port-focussed and thus was among the settled urban parts that suffered in the early 19th century severe malaria outbreak. This prompted building the Weltevreden, "well-contented", the new administrative heart of the city, which was at the time the city of Batavia. Industry and associated housing, needing port direct connectivity followed for much of the 20th century. Development continues to focus on other districts where the land is easier to drain and thus less costly to build high-rise, whilst keeping a partially green, tree-rich prospect from many coastal locations along this shore.

== List of important places ==
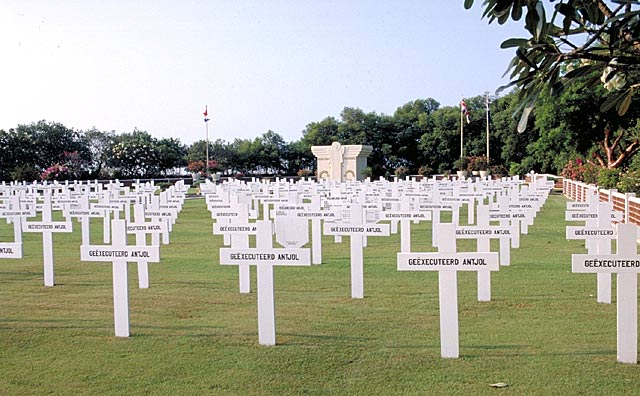
Ancol Cemetery

- Ancol War Cemetery
- Ancol Taman Impian (Taman Impian Jaya Ancol)
- Ancol railway station
- Sunda Kelapa Harbor
- Mangga Dua
- Jakarta International Expo
- Jakarta International e-Prix Circuit
- Kampung Bandan railway station
