= Port of Tanjung Priok =

Port of Tanjung Priok Pelabuhan Tanjung Priok
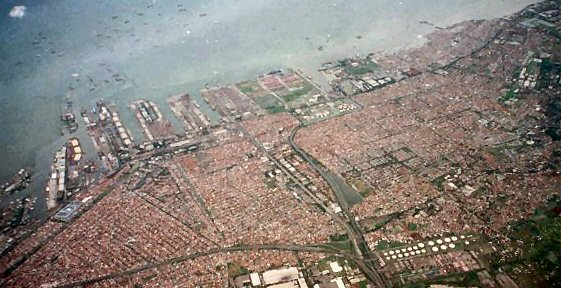
- Aerial view
- Interactive map of Port of Tanjung Priok; Pelabuhan Tanjung Priok

Location
- Country: Indonesia
- Location: Tanjung Priok, North Jakarta
- Coordinates: 6.104°S 106.8865°E
- UN/LOCODE: ID TPP

Details
- Owned by: PT Pelabuhan Indonesia
- Type of Harbor: Coastal breakwater
- Size of harbour: 604 ha (6.04 sq km)
- Land area: 424 ha (4.24 sq km)
- Size: 1,028 ha (10.28 sq km)
- No. of berths: 76

Statistics
- Annual container volume: 6.59 million TEU's (2013)
- Website www.priokport.co.id

The Port of Tanjung Priok (Indonesian: Pelabuhan Tanjung Priok) is the busiest and most advanced seaport in Indonesia, handling more than 50% of Indonesia's trans-shipment cargo traffic. The port is located at Tanjung Priok, North Jakarta, and is operated by Indonesian state-owned PT Pelindo. The port has 20 terminals for accommodating general cargo, liquid bulk, dry bulk, containers, etc. It has specialised facilities catering to oil tankers, chemical-laden ships, metal scrap, and passengers.

The port loaded and unloaded 6.2 million, 6.92 million, and 7.8 million TEUs of cargo during 2016, 2017, and 2018, respectively, out of a total capacity of about 8 million TEUs. Lloyd's One Hundred Ports 2019 ranked the container port as the 22nd busiest in the world.

== History ==
The earliest record of Jakarta as a coastal settlement and port can be traced to the Indianized kingdom of Tarumanagara as early as the fourth century. In AD 39, King Purnawarman established Sunda Pura as the kingdom's new capital city, located on the northern coast of Java. Purnawarman left seven memorial stones with inscriptions bearing his name spread across the area, including the present-day Banten and West Java provinces. The Tugu Inscription is considered the oldest of all of them.

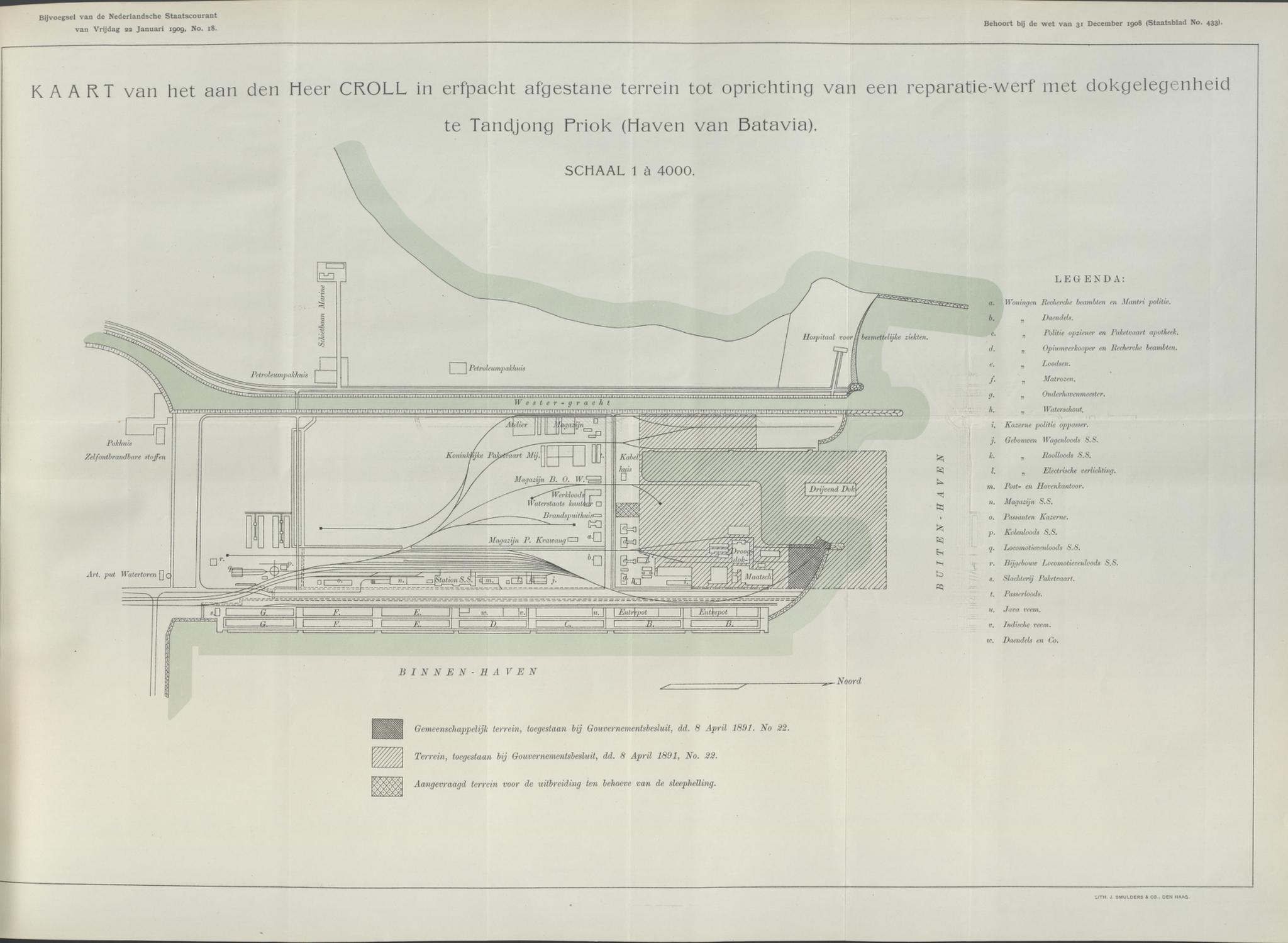
Tanjung Priok in 1908

After Tarumanagara's power declined, all of its territories, including Sunda Pura, became part of the Kingdom of Sunda. The harbour area was renamed Sunda Kelapa, as written in a Hindu monk's lontar manuscripts, which are now located at the Bodleian Library of Oxford University in England, and travel records by Prince Bujangga Manik.

By the 14th century, Sunda Kelapa became a major trading port for the kingdom. The first European fleet, four Portuguese ships from Malacca, arrived in 1513 when the Portuguese sought a route for spices, especially black pepper.

A new harbour was needed for the Dutch East Indies to replace the Sunda Kelapa harbour to the west, which was too small for the increased traffic resulting from the opening of the Suez Canal. Construction on the Port of Tanjung Priok began in 1877, along with Tanjung Priuk railway station and other supporting facilities. The construction of the new harbour was started by Governor General Johan Wilhelm van Lansberge (1875-1881). The new harbour was named Tandjong Priok. Several facilities were built to support the function of the new harbour, such as the Tanjung Priuk Station (1914).

The port is part of the Maritime Silk Road, which runs from the Chinese coast via the Suez Canal to the Mediterranean and then to the Upper Adriatic region of Trieste, where there are further rail connections to Central and Eastern Europe.

== JICT ==
A container terminal of the port is known as Jakarta International Container Terminal (JICT). It is operated by Hutchison Port Holdings and Pelindo and is the largest container terminal in Indonesia and the country's national hub port. In April 2011, JICT received an Asian Freight and Supply Chain Award (AFSCA) for the best service quality and technology innovation of terminals with less than 4 million twenty-foot equivalent units of handling capacity.

== Port extension (New Priok Terminal) ==
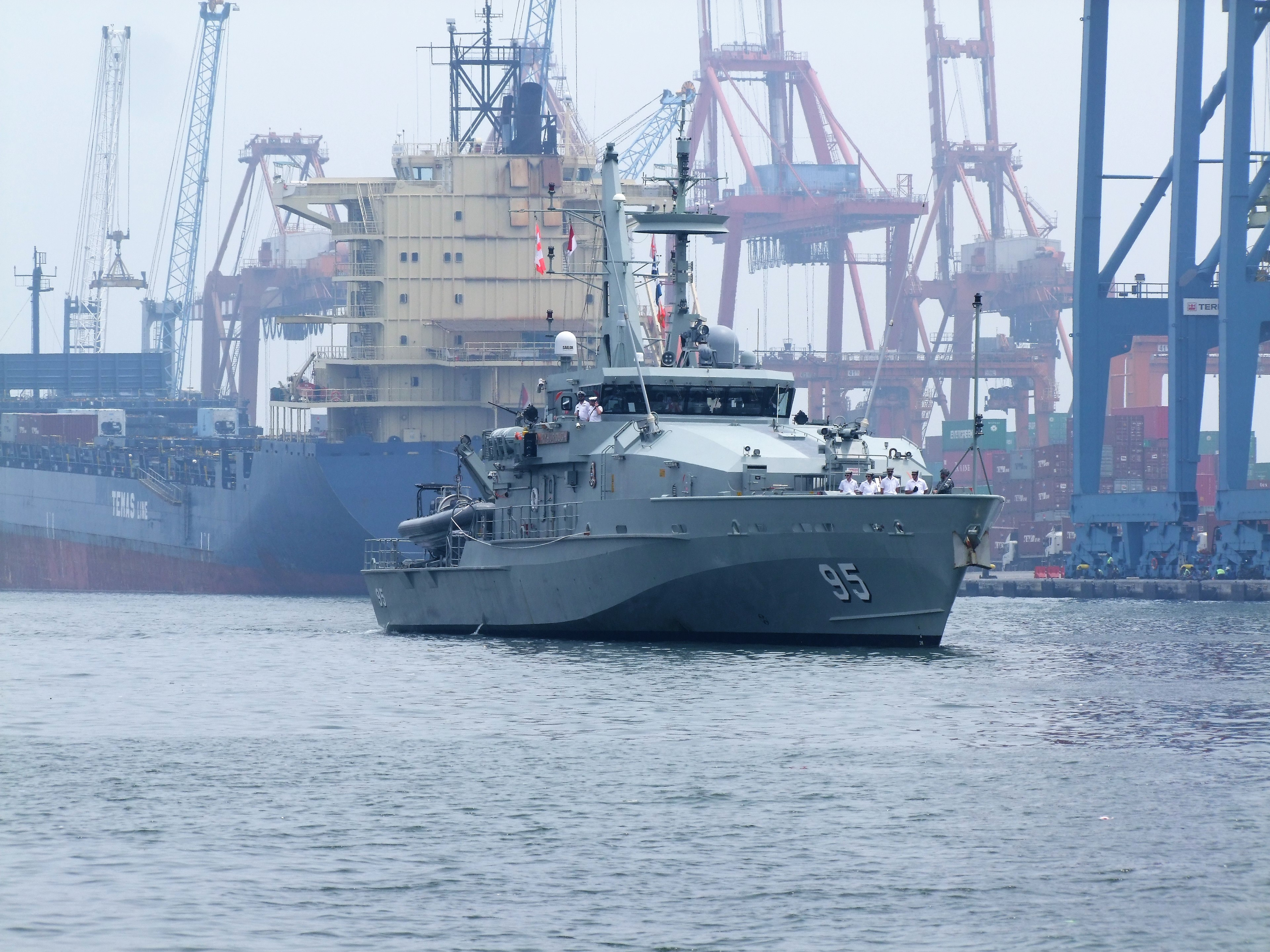
A ship docking at the port

The port was among the least efficient in all Southeast Asia, with turn-around times 6 times that of Singapore, and severely congested due to slow customs handling, as well as limited port capacity. Regarding the port capacity, the two-phase "New Priok" extension project is ongoing and is expected to be fully operational in 2023. When fully operational, this New Priok Port (also known as Kalibaru Port) will increase the annual capacity of Tanjung Priok more than triple. Annual capacity will increase from five million twenty-foot equivalent units (TEU) of containers to 18 million TEU. The port will also be able to facilitate triple-E class container ships (with an 18,000 TEU capacity) in a 300-metre-wide (980 ft) two-way sea lane.

The first phase of the project was completed in 2016, which has helped to improve the port's performance. The dwelling time in the port, which was once seven days, was reduced to almost three days. With eight cranes that can move 30 containers per hour and berths that can dock ships with a draft of as much as 16 metres (52 ft), the new terminal, NPT 1, can accommodate container ships with a capacity of up to 15,000 TEUs. The terminal has a land area of 32 hectares (79 acres), and the dock length is 450 metres (1,480 ft). A joint venture between state-run port operator Pelindo II and a Japan-Singapore consortium handled the project under PT New Priok Container Terminal 1 (NPCT1).

== Description ==
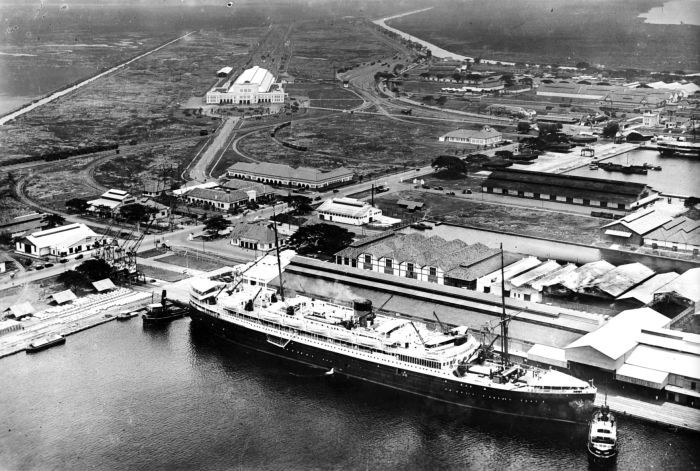
MS Pieter Corneliszoon Hooft docked at Port of Tanjung Priok in the early 1930s. At the background was Tanjung Priok Station.

The Port of Tanjung Priok has 20 terminals: general cargo, multipurpose terminal, scraps terminal, passenger terminal, dry bulk terminal, liquid bulk terminal, oil terminal, chemicals terminal and three container terminals. It also has 76 berths, a quay length of 16,853 metres (55,292 ft), a total storage area of 661,822 square metres (7,123,790 ft^{2}), and a storage capacity of 401,468 tonnes.

== Marunda terminal ==
PT Karya Citra Nusantara (KCN) operates Marunda Port, which was built to reduce the burden of bulk handling at Tanjung Priok port terminals. Pier 1 of this port has been operating since 2018, and another two piers are under construction. Once completed, the port will be able to handle about 30 to 35 million tons of bulk per year from 50 ships. The port will have three piers/docks with a total length of 5,350 metres (17,550 ft) and a supporting area spreading over 100 hectares (250 acres) of land.

== See also ==
- List of Indonesian ports
- List of world's busiest container ports
- Ministry of Transportation, Indonesia
- Transport in Indonesia
- Tanjung Priok
- Sunda Kelapa
