= Tanjung Priok railway station =

Railway station in Indonesia

TP05 Tanjung Priok Station Stasiun Tanjung Priok
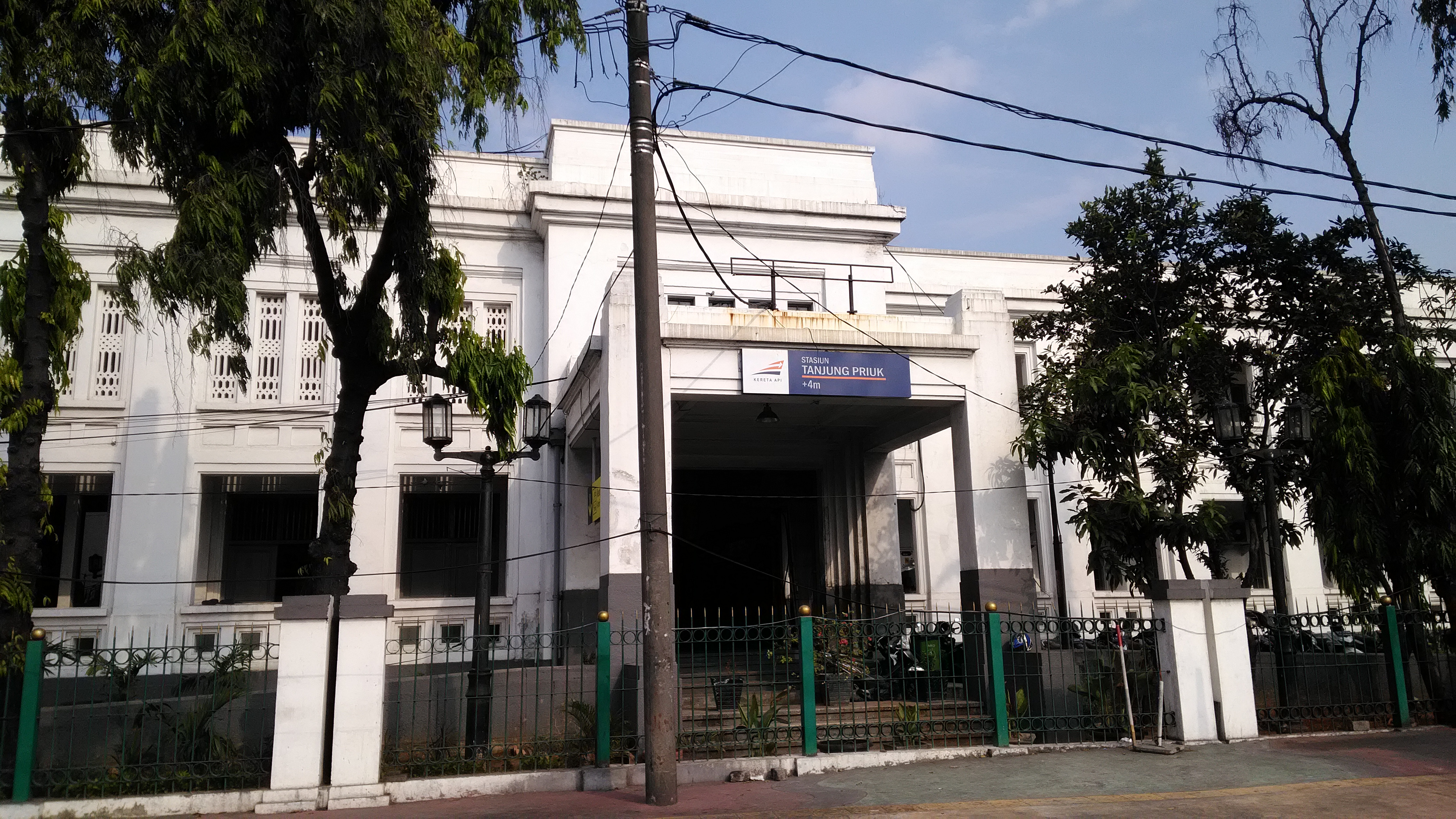
- Tanjung Priok Station, 2019.

General information
- Location: Jalan Taman Stasiun Tanjung Priok, Tanjung Priok, Tanjung Priok, North Jakarta 14310; Jakarta; Indonesia
- Coordinates: 6.1111°S 106.8808°E
- Elevation: +4 m (13 ft)
- Owner: Kereta Api Indonesia
- Operator: Kereta Api Indonesia; Kereta Commuter Indonesia; KAI Logistik
- Line: Tanjung Priok Line
- Platforms: 4 bay platforms
- Tracks: 8
- Connections: Tanjung Priok

Construction
- Structure type: Ground
- Parking: Available
- Accessible: Available
- Architect: C.W. Koch
- Architectural style: Art deco

Other information
- Station code: TPK • 0480
- Classification: II

History
- Opened: 2 November 1885; 28 April 2009 (reopened)
- Rebuilt: 6 April 1925
- Electrified: 6 April 1925
- Former names: (Dutch East Indies) Tandjong Priok (1885–1901) (Dutch East Indies) Tandjoeng Priok (1901–1947) (EVO) (Indonesia) Tandjung Priok (1947–1972) (RSS)

Services
Passenger train: KRL Commuterline
Freight train: Container train
Preceding station		Following station
Jakarta International Stadium towards Jakarta Kota	Tanjung Priok Commuter Line	Terminus
Location
- Location within Jakarta

Tanjung Priok Station (TPK) is a railway station in Tanjung Priok, Tanjung Priok, North Jakarta. It is located across the Tanjung Priok Port, which is the main port of Jakarta. This station is one of the oldest in Jakarta and the biggest station built during the Dutch East Indies era. It is included in the list of heritage buildings by the government of Jakarta.

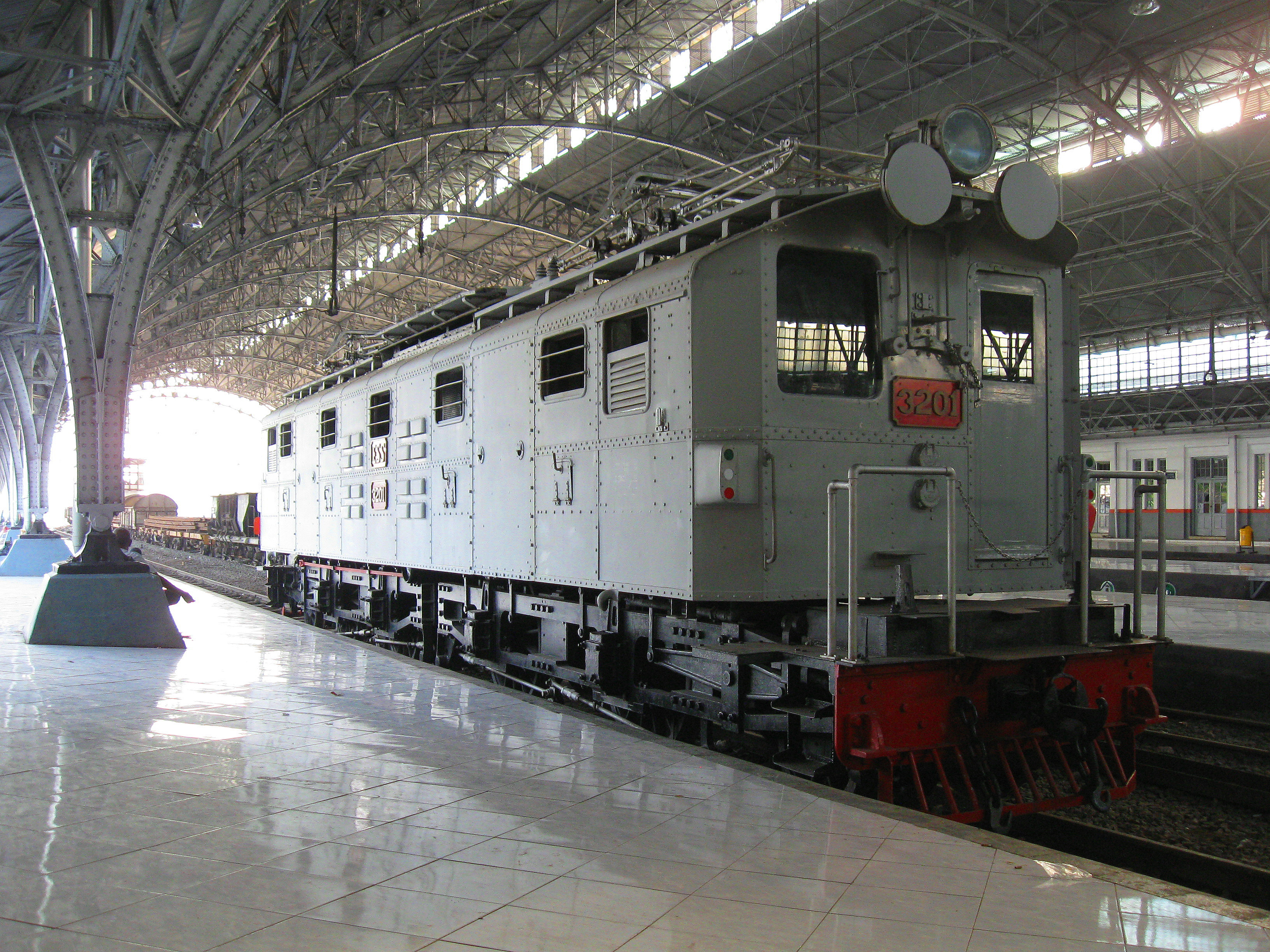
Preserved Loko ESS3201 at Tanjung Priok station

== History ==
The history of Tanjung Priok station is intertwined with the port of Tanjung Priok, the main port and gateway to Batavia and thereby of the entire Dutch East Indies.

=== First generation ===
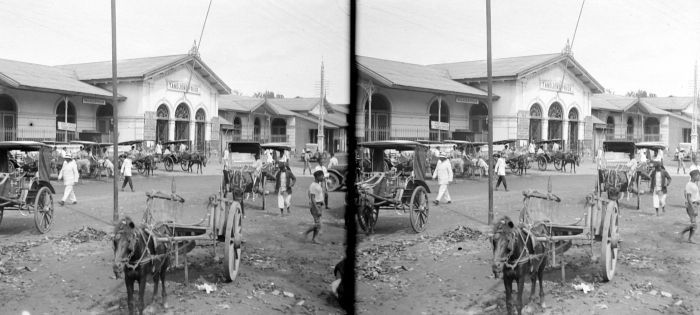
The old building of the Tanjung Priok station

In the past, Tanjung Priok was a dangerous forest and swamp, so a safe means of transportation was needed at that time (railway). At the end of the 19th century, the Sunda Kelapa port which was originally located in the area around the Fish Market was no longer sufficient, and the Dutch built a new port facility at Tanjung Priok. The port was built in 1877 in response to the increased maritime traffic accompanying the opening of the Suez Canal. Since Tanjung Priok is situated further away from Batavia than the old port of Sunda Kelapa, a railway was constructed linking Tanjung Priok to the city of Batavia in the southwest. This would provide a safe and comfortable means of transportation in the swampy area.

The first Tanjung Priok Station is located near the pier of Tanjung Priok Port. This station was completed by Burgerlijke Openbare Werken (BOW) or civil public works in 1883 and it was only on November 2, 1885 that its opening was inaugurated at the same time as the opening of Tanjung Priok Port. The first station opened to the quay immediately next to the first harbour.

Furthermore, the operation of the Sunda Kelapa-Tanjung Priok railway line was handed over to Staatsspoorwegen (SS). Until 1900, no less than 40 train trips per day for the Tanjung Priok–Batavia SS/NIS and Tanjung Priok–Kemayoran round trip routes.

=== Second generation ===
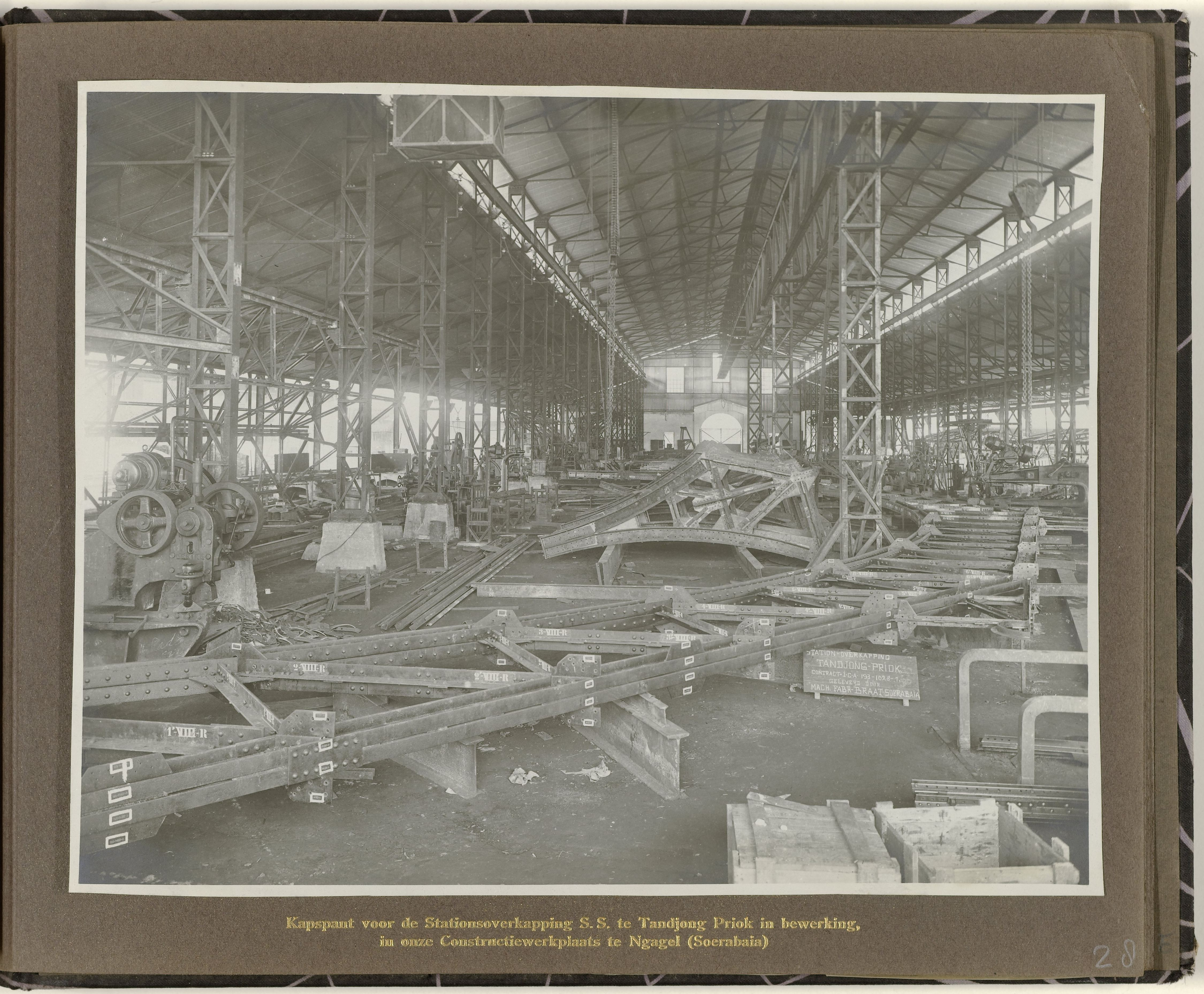
The assembly of the Tanjung Priok station overcapping roof in Machinefabriek Braat, Surabaya, East Java

With the increase of the port activity since the early 20th century, there has been an expansion of the port which caused the Tanjung Priok Station to be evicted. SS then looked for vacant land next to the Lagoa warehouse to build a new station. SS assigned Engineer C.W. Koch as the main architect of the station.

To prepare for the construction of the station, SS made a mock-up model of the new Tanjung Priok Station. This mockup appears in the book commemorating the 50th anniversary of the SS by S.A. Reitsma. SS then contracted a steel company named Machinefabriek Braat Soerabaia-Djokja-Tegal located in Ngagel, Surabaya to manufacture its overcapping roof frame. At that time, the ruling Governor General was A.F.W. Idenburg (1909-1916). It takes about 1,700 workers with 130 of them being European workers.

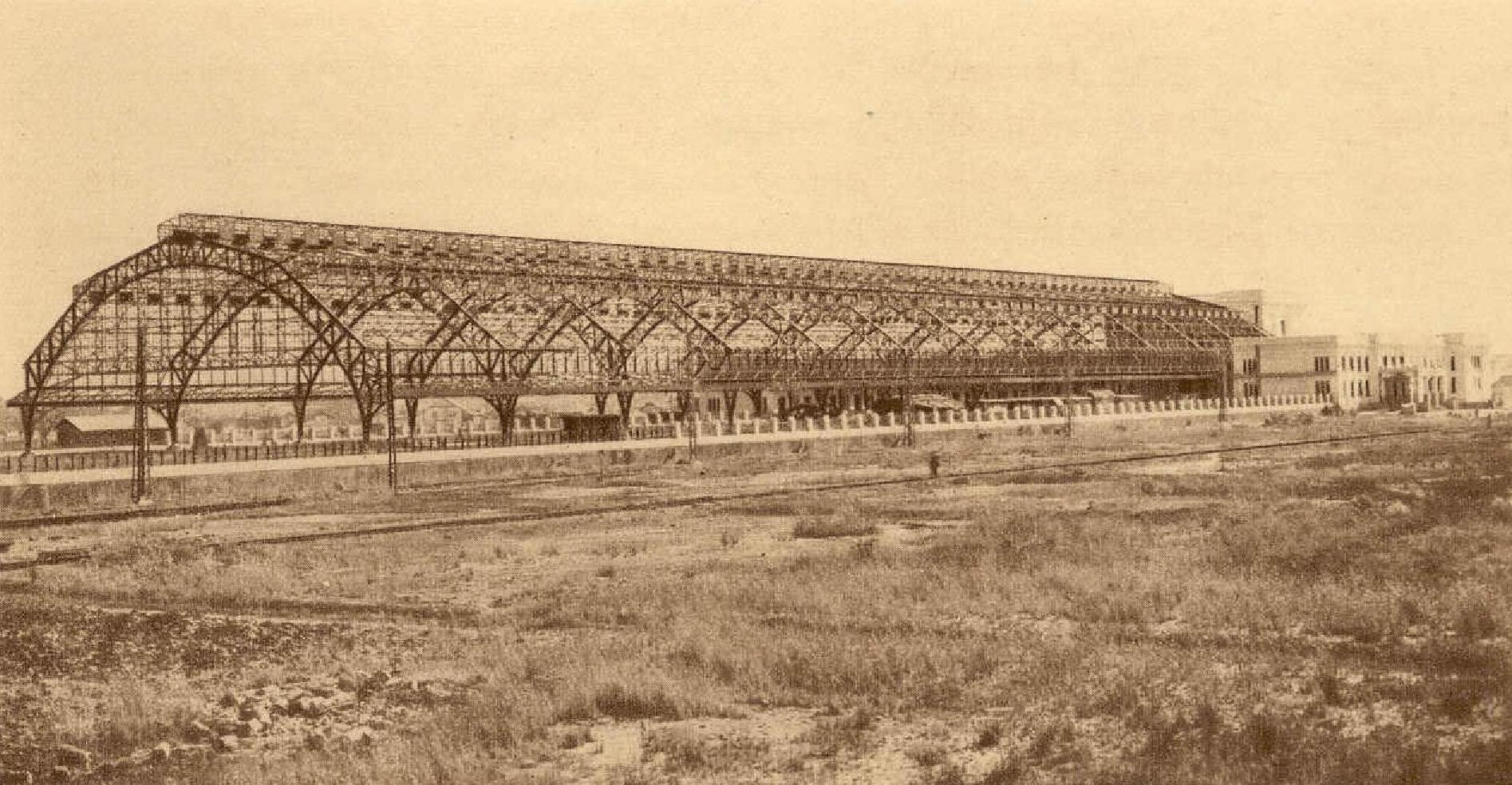
The roof structure of the station c. 1925

This new station was opened to the public on 6 April 1925 which coincided with the launch of the first KRL route from Tanjung Priok to Meester Cornelis (Jatinegara). The first launch was also carried out to commemorate the 50th anniversary of the SS. The station building is in the Art Deco style and has an area of 3,678 m2 (0.3678 ha), standing on an embankment area which covers 46,930 m2 (4.693 ha).

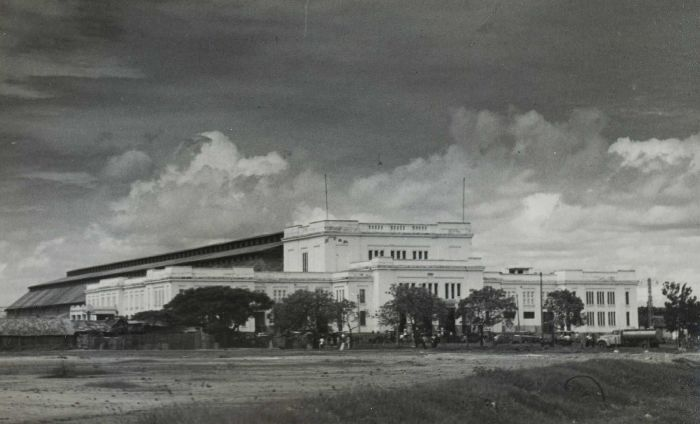
The building of the station c. 1950s

With the completion of this station, the "wasting act" was committed by the SS. With eight lines and five platforms, this station is very large and since 1929 this station is almost as big as the Batavia-benedenstad station which has now turned into Jakarta Kota Station. Unfortunately, ships that dock at Tanjung Priok Harbor do not bring passengers to this station. This station later only became the terminus for KRL (electric commuter train) since 1925.

This station is also equipped with temporary accommodation on the left wing of the building for passengers who will continue their journey by ship. With the opening of Kemayoran Airport which serves general flights, SS experienced a tough challenge considering that many passengers switched to airplanes. The location of Tanjung Priok Station which is far from the port makes passengers reluctant to use the train, even though feeder buses are available. World War II had a significant impact on SS railroad operations. During the Japanese occupation of Indonesia, this station was prioritized for war purposes and sent romusha out of Java.

=== Present day ===
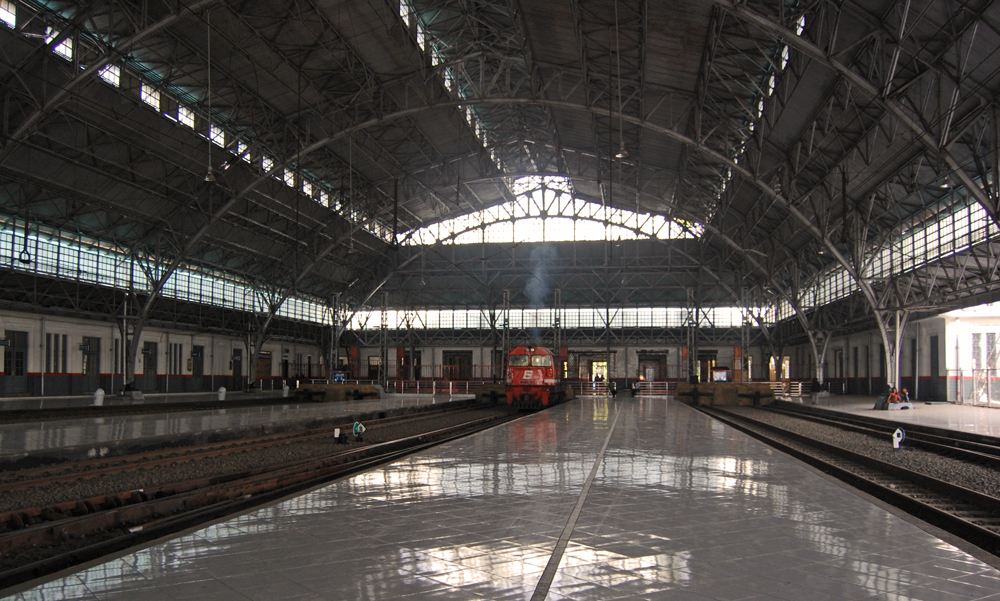
The Tanjung Priok Station emplacement, with locomotive BB 306 84 06 (BB 306 08) being heated (2009)

In the early 1990s, the Ministry of Transportation had planned to build a Jakarta outer ring rail network that would connect this station with Cikarang Station via Pasoso Station, but was diverted to Sungai Lagoa Station. One of the goals is to minimize freight trains crossing urban areas in Jakarta. At first the plan went quite well with the completion of the Citayam to Nambo railway network, but the 1997 Asian financial crisis made this plan stop halfway.

Amidst the hustle and bustle of the port, the condition of the station building became increasingly unkempt towards the 21st century. Nonetheless, the elegance of this neoclassical, art deco and contemporary building has proven that in the 20th century, this station triumphed in its time. Indeed, at that time PT Kereta Api had deactivated the station for passenger service in early January 2000. The roof of the building is off; many of the glass is broken and many of the framework is rusty with age. The station platform and its emplacements are full of homeless people. In order to "patch up" the leaking revenue due to stowaways and losses due to the lack of revenue from platform tickets, PT Kereta Api leased out its station space as a warehouse for expeditions, ticket agents, and money exchange services.

Concerned about this condition, PT Kereta Api decided to completely renovate the station. Preparations were carried out in November-December 2008 by carrying out a major physical renovation of the station building. Furthermore, the project continued with the rehabilitation of rail facilities and the construction of electrical signaling devices in early 2009. On 28 April 2009, this station was able to return to function and was inaugurated by President Susilo Bambang Yudhoyono, along with the inauguration of Terminal 3 of the Soekarno–Hatta International Airport.

== Building and layout ==
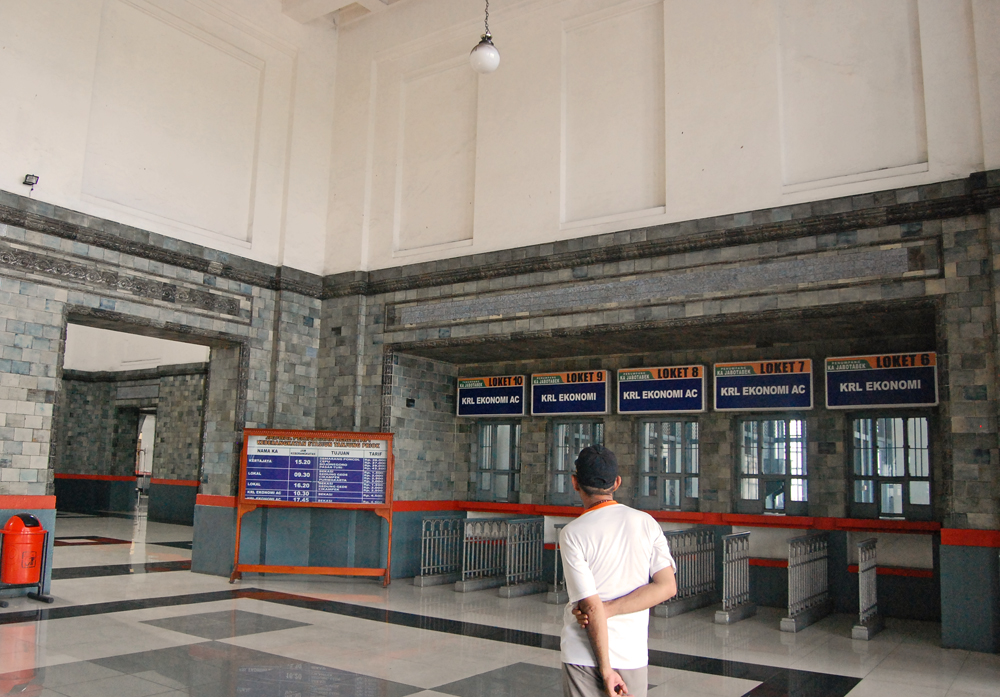
The hall of the station and ticket counters

This station has eight train lines with line 2 as a straight line to Jakarta Kota, line 3 as a straight line from Jakarta Kota, line 6 as a straight line to Rajawali-Pasar Senen-Jatinegara, and line 7 as a straight line from Jatinegara-Pasar Senen-Rajawali. On the northwestern wing of the station emplacement there is a fork in the path to the port.

Even though this station is not a central station, it is quite modern because it uses an arc-shaped overcapping framework that covers the six railway lines. Steel structures became common on European stations in the 20th century. Windows in the form of lines consisting of horizontal roof profile trim and cornice holes, vertical lines and wall indentations, giving a graceful impression. Stained glass and ceramic profile ornaments give a grandiose effect and are strengthened by large and strong columns on the main porch and supported by stairs along the building.

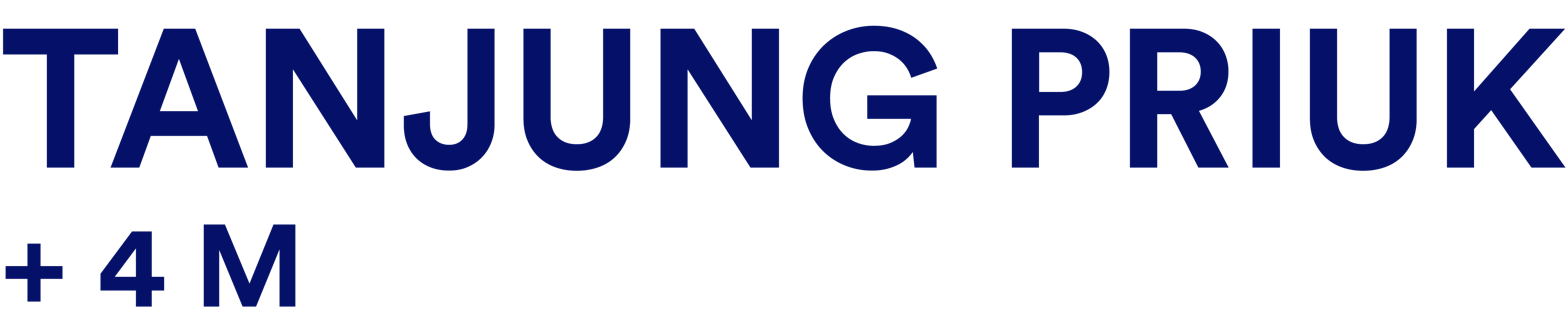
TP05
G	South departure gate
Station hall and east departure gate	Side platform
Station hall and east departure gate	Line 8	-
Station hall and east departure gate	Line 7	-
Station hall and east departure gate	Bay platform
Station hall and east departure gate	Line 6	Flat train car parking
Station hall and east departure gate	Line 5	Flat train car parking
Station hall and east departure gate	Bay platform
Station hall and east departure gate	Line 4	Flat train car parking
Station hall and east departure gate	Line 3	Flat train car parking
Station hall and east departure gate	Bay platform
Station hall and east departure gate	Line 2	Tanjung Priok Line to Jakarta Kota (Jakarta International Stadium) →
Station hall and east departure gate	Line 1	Tanjung Priok Line to Jakarta Kota (Jakarta International Stadium) → and flat train car parking
Station hall and east departure gate	Side platform
G	North departure gate

Notes:

- Currently, Line 1 and 2 serves KRL Commuterline Tanjung Priok Line.
- Currently, Line 1, 3, 4, 5, and 6 are only used for flat train car parking (filled or empty).

== Services ==
So far only a few long distance economy class trains depart/terminate at this station. Starting from 1 November 2014, Tanjung Priok Station only serves freight trains heading from/to Tanjung Priok Port. All passenger trains that used to terminate here were rerouted to Pasar Senen.

On 21 December 2015, the pink line to Jakarta Kota railway station was reopened, after being inactive for years.

=== Passenger train ===
==== Commuterline ====
Type	Route	Destination	Notes
KRL Commuterline	Tanjung Priok Line	Jakarta Kota–Tanjung Priok	

=== Freight train ===
- Container transportation: Swing point towards Pasoso or towards JICT Tanjung Priok Port:
  - from and towards Kalimas
  - from and towards Surabaya Container Terminal
  - from and towards Indro via Kandangan
  - from and towards Gedebage via Kiaracondong
  - from and towards Lemahabang
- Container transportation: Transition point to Pasoso to take towards Sungai Lagoa:
  - from and towards Kalimas
  - from and towards Semarang Tawang

== Supporting transportation ==
Type	Station	Route	Destination
TransJakarta	Tanjung Priok	List of TransJakarta corridors#Corridor 10	Tanjung Priok–PGC
TransJakarta	Tanjung Priok		Tanjung Priok–Blok M
TransJakarta	Tanjung Priok	List of TransJakarta corridors#Corridor 12	Pluit–Tanjung Priok
TransJakarta	Tanjung Priok	10A (Non-BRT)	Tanjung Prok–Marunda
TransJakarta	N/A	14B (Non-BRT)	Tanjung Priok–Pasar Senen via Jakarta International Stadium
TransJakarta	N/A	JAK-1 (MikroTrans Jak Lingko)	Tanjung Priok–Kebon Bawang
TransJakarta	N/A	JAK-15 (MikroTrans Jak Lingko)	Tanjung Priok–Segaramakmur, Bekasi
TransJakarta	N/A	JAK-29 (MikroTrans Jak Lingko)	Tanjung Priok–Sukapura
TransJakarta	N/A	JAK-77 (MikroTrans Jak Lingko)	Tanjung Priok–Sunter Agung
TransJakarta	N/A	JAK-88 (MikroTrans Jak Lingko)	Tanjung Priok–Ancol
TransJakarta	N/A	JAK-117 (MikroTrans Jak Lingko)	Tanjung Priok–Tanah Merdeka
DAMRI	N/A		Tanjung Priok–Soekarno–Hatta International Airport
Transjabodetabek	N/A	AC25 (Mayasari Bakti)	Tanjung Priok–Bekasi
Transjabodetabek	N/A	AC42 (Mayasari Bakti)	Tanjung Priok–Cileungsi
Transjabodetabek	N/A	x1 (Kramat Djati)	Tanjung Priok–Baranangsiang, Bogor
Transjabodetabek	N/A	x2 (Kosub Bersama)	Tanjung Priok–Cibinong
Transjabodetabek	N/A	x3 (CBU)	Tanjung Priok–Leuwiliang
Angkot & Mikrolet (share taxis)	N/A	U01	Tanjung Priok–Pulo Gebang
Angkot & Mikrolet (share taxis)	N/A	U03A	Tanjung Priok–Pulo Gebang (via Cakung–Cilincing)
Angkot & Mikrolet (share taxis)	N/A	U05	Tanjung Priok–Cilincing (via Lagoa)
Angkot & Mikrolet (share taxis)	N/A	U06	Tanjung Priok–Alur Laut (via Pasar Koja, Walang)
Angkot & Mikrolet (share taxis)	N/A	U07	Tanjung Priok–Pegangsaan Dua
Angkot & Mikrolet (share taxis)	N/A	U08	Tanjung Priok–Rorotan
Angkot & Mikrolet (share taxis)	N/A	U09	Tanjung Priok–Kramat Jaya (via Walang, Pasar Lontar)
Angkot & Mikrolet (share taxis)	N/A	JU02	Tanjung Priok–Pasar Embrio
Angkot & Mikrolet (share taxis)	N/A	JU02	Tanjung Priok–Rawa Badak Utara
Angkot & Mikrolet (share taxis)	N/A	JU04	Tanjung Priok–Sunter Agung
Angkot & Mikrolet (share taxis)	N/A	M14	Tanjung Priok–Cilincing (via Jampea)
Angkot & Mikrolet (share taxis)	N/A	M15	Tanjung Priok–Jakarta Kota Station (via Kampung Bandan Raya)
Angkot & Mikrolet (share taxis)	N/A	M15A	Tanjung Priok–Jakarta Kota Station (via Gunung Sahari–Mangga Dua Raya)
Angkot & Mikrolet (share taxis)	N/A	M30A	Tanjung Priok–Pulo Gadung
Angkot & Mikrolet (share taxis)	N/A	M49	Tanjung Priok–Sunter Agung

== In popular culture ==
Tanjung Priok Station is often used as a shooting location for music videos, movies, soap operas, and commercials. Several titles of soap operas and songs whose music videos have used filming locations at this station include Dia Bukan Anakku (RCTI, SinemArt), "Menunggumu" sung by Chrisye featuring Peterpan (now named Noah), "Ku Tetap Menanti" created by Eka Gustiwana sung by Nikita Willy, and "Dengan Nafasmu" by Ungu.

=== Photography prohibition ===
Since the commercialization of Tanjung Priok Station through commercials, television shows, and music videos filming, this station is now a very strict place for novice and experienced photographers because this place is prohibited as a photographing area, even though there are absolutely no signs prohibiting taking pictures. at Station. The reason for the cultural heritage status of this station is "never implemented" at other sites managed by the local government or BPCB. Taking an SLR camera (including DSLR and mirrorless) or pocket digital camera on several occasions can be warned by security officers. Since the enactment of the new photographing rules at Commuter Line KRL stations, only cell phone cameras, pocket cameras, SLRs and action cameras (GoPro) are allowed to be used to photograph stations.

== Cited works ==
- Widayanti, Rina; Widyarsih, Meyka (2012). "Analisis Perkembangan Gaya Arsitektur pada Fasade Bangunan Stasiun Kereta Tanjung Priuk". Jurnal Ilmiah Desain & Konstruksi. 11 (2). ISSN 2089-807X.
