= Poris railway station =

Railway station in Indonesia

T08 Poris Station Stasiun Poris
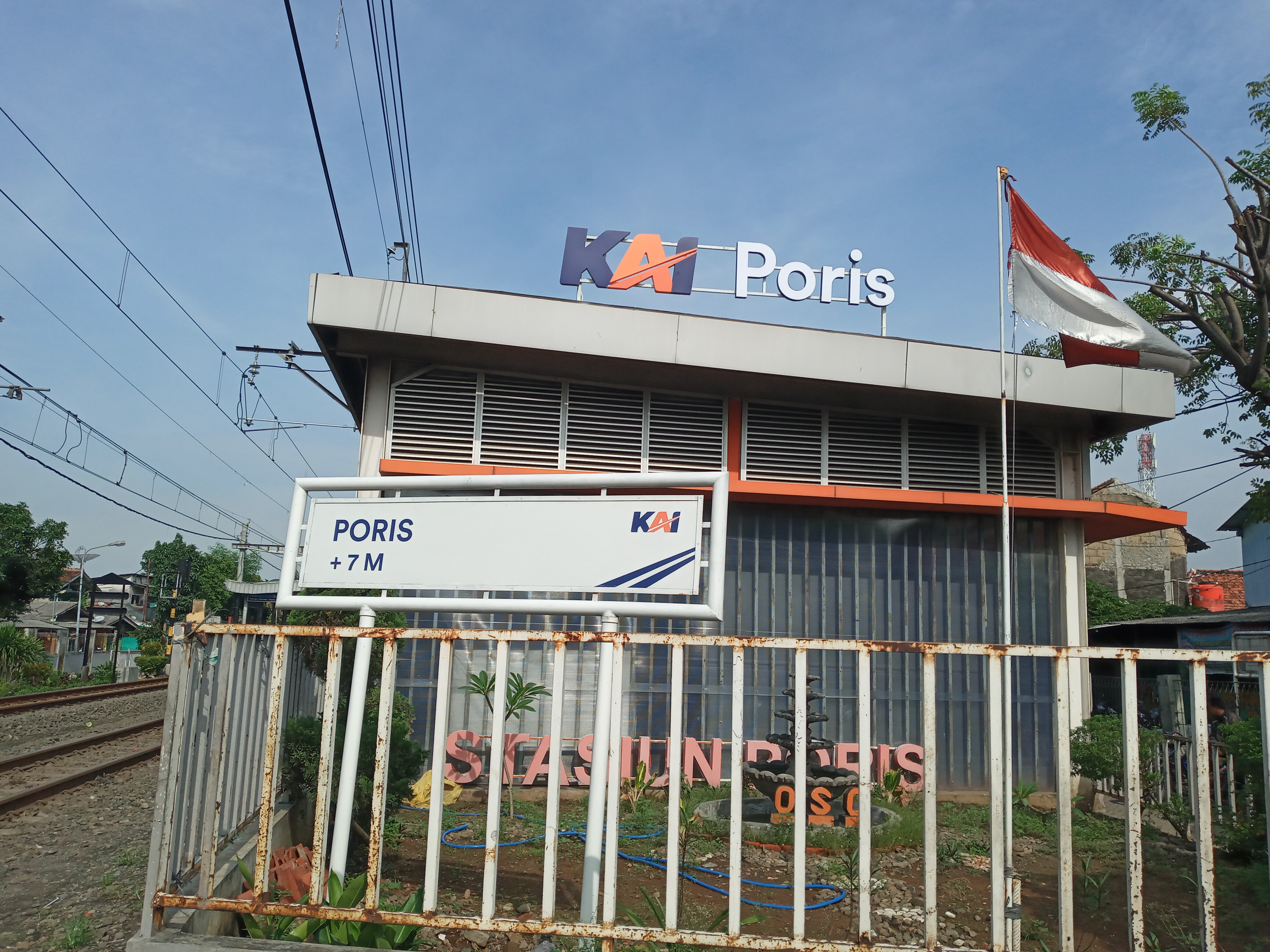
- Poris Station, photo was taken on 5 November 2021.

General information
- Location: Jl. Maulana Hasanuddin, Poris Gaga, Batuceper, Tangerang; Banten; Indonesia
- Coordinates: 6.1699387°S 106.6800057°E
- Elevation: +7 m (23 ft)
- Owner: Kereta Api Indonesia
- Operator: KAI Commuter
- Lines: Duri–Tangerang railway; Tangerang Line
- Platforms: 2 side platforms
- Tracks: 2

Construction
- Structure type: Ground
- Parking: Available
- Accessible: Available

Other information
- Station code: PI
- Classification: Class III

History
- Opened: 2 January 1899
- Electrified: 1997

Services
Preceding station		Following station
Kalideres towards Duri	Tangerang Commuter Line	Batu Ceper towards Tangerang
Soekarno–Hatta Airport Commuter Line does not stop here
Location
- Location within Jakarta Metropolitan Area

Poris Station (PI) is a class III railway station located in Poris Gaga, Batuceper, Tangerang. The station, which is located at an altitude of +7 meters, is included in the Jakarta Operational Area I, is the easternmost train station in Tangerang, and only serves the KRL Commuterline route.

== Building and layout ==
This station has two railway tracks, where both of them are straight tracks.

T08 Poris
Platform floor	Side platform, the doors are opened on the right side	
Platform floor	Line 2	← (Batu Ceper) Tangerang Line to Tangerang
Platform floor	Line 1	Tangerang Line to Duri (Kalideres) →
Platform floor	Side platform, the doors are opened on the right side	
G	Main building	

== Services ==
The following is a list of train services at the Poris Station.

=== Passenger services ===
- KAI Commuter
  - Tangerang Line, to Duri and Tangerang

== Intermodal support ==
Public transport type	Line	Destination
Angkot	R10	Poris Station-Pasar Anyar
Angkot	B11	Poris Station-Danau Cipondoh

== Gallery ==
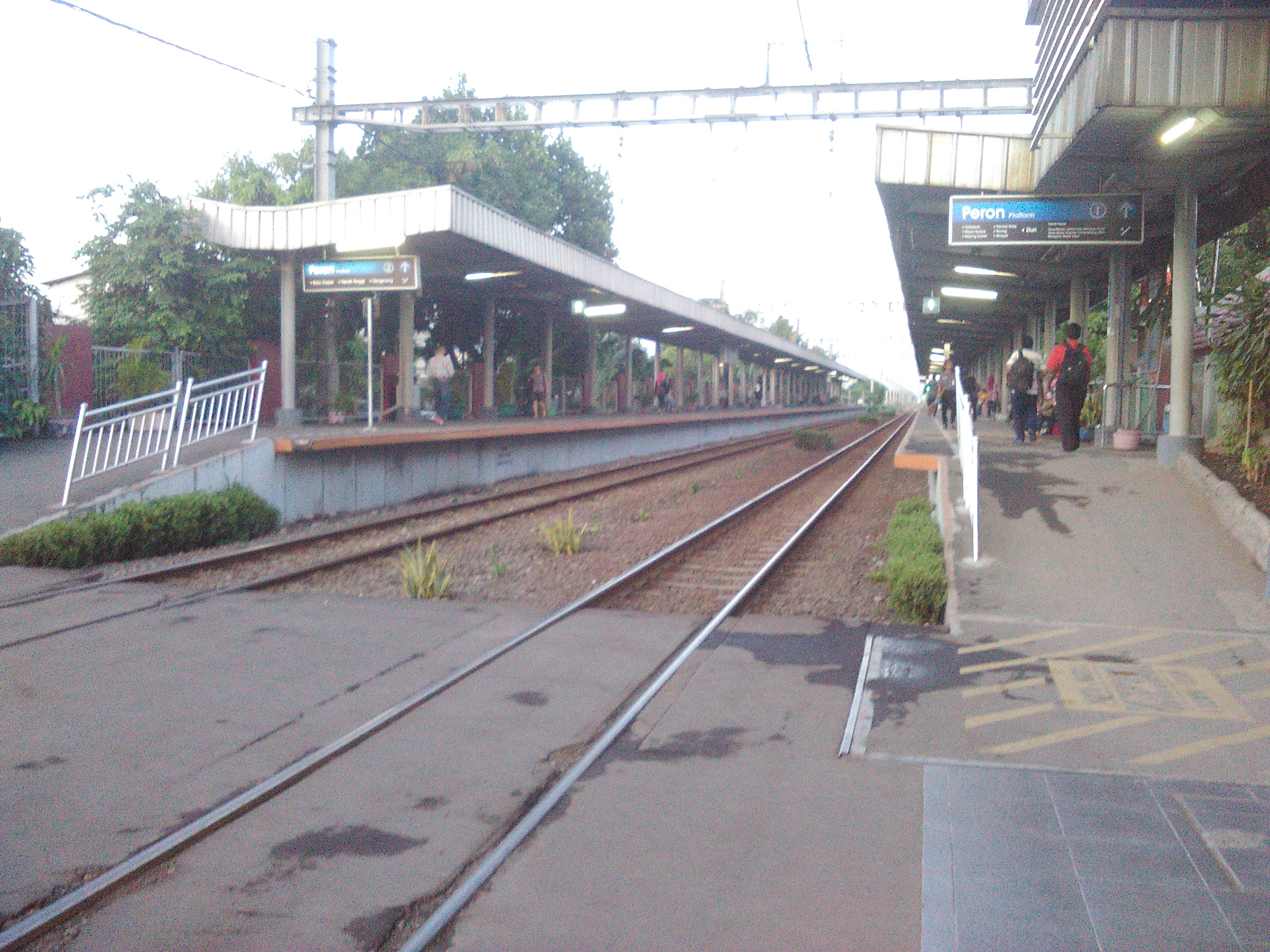
The emplacement of the station (2016)

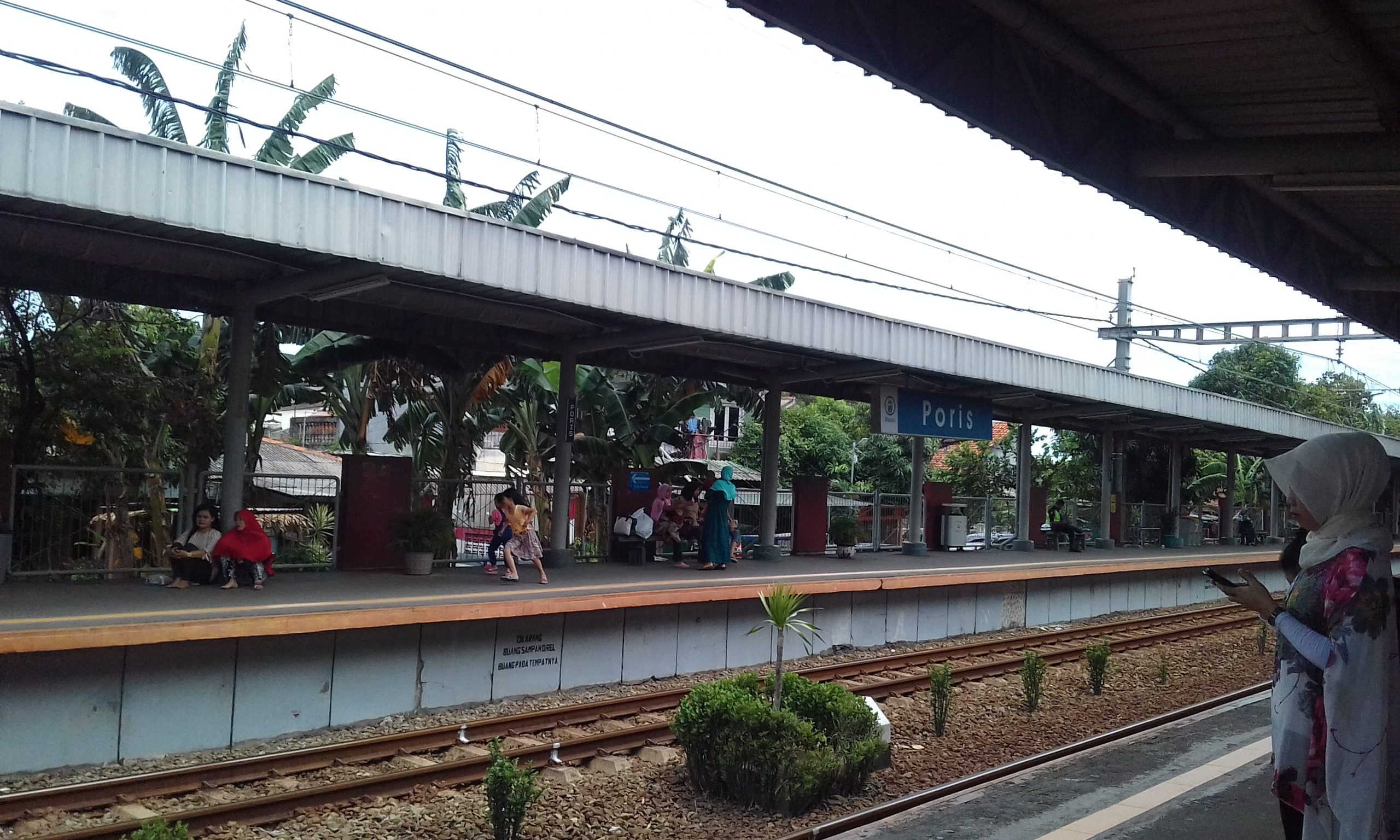
The platform of the station (2018)

Preceding station	Kereta Api Indonesia	Following station
Kalideres towards Duri	Duri–Tangerang	Batu Ceper towards Tangerang
