= Rawa Buaya railway station =

Railway station in Indonesia

A03a T06 Rawa Buaya Station Stasiun Rawa Buaya
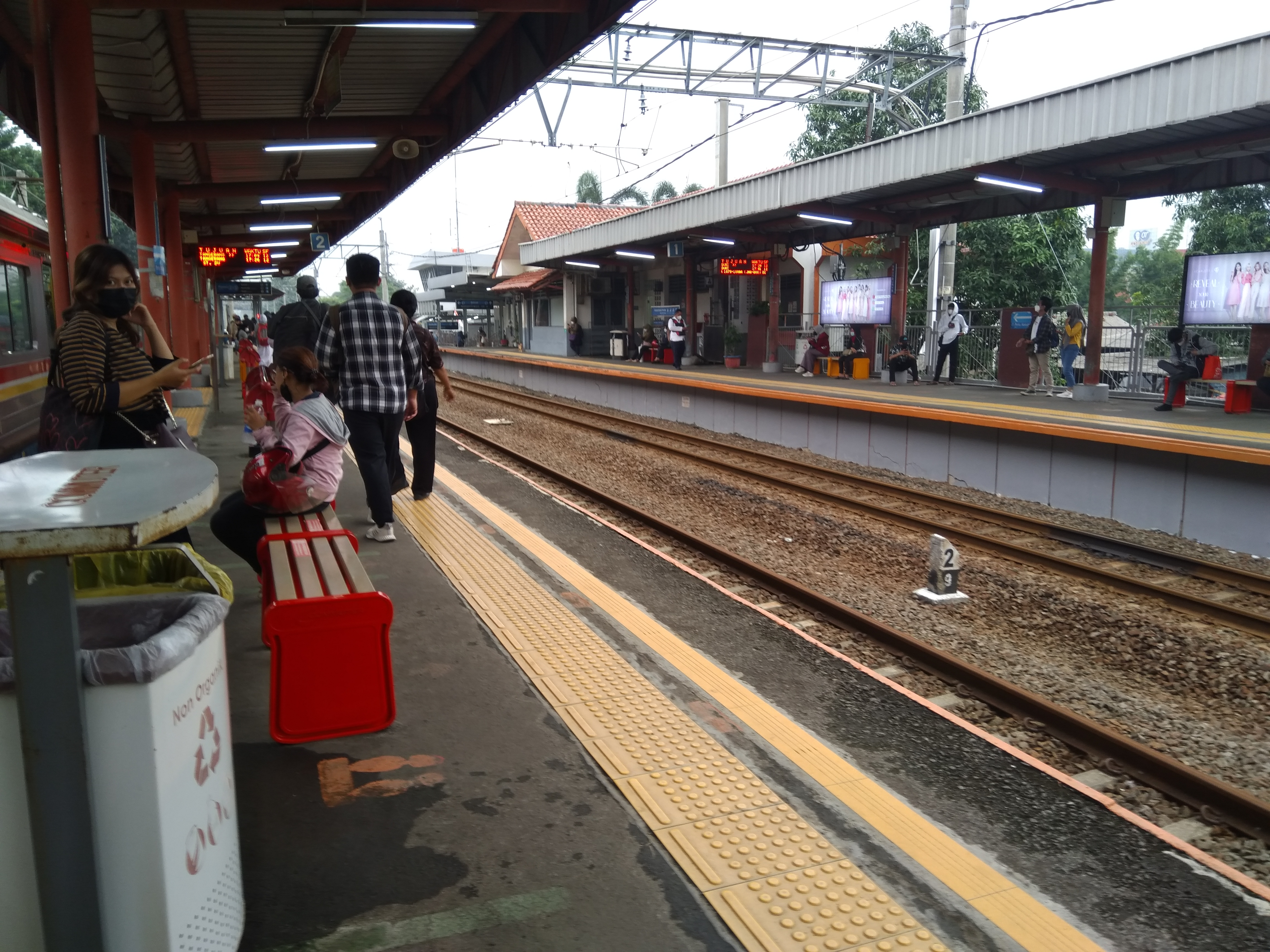
- Platforms of Rawa Buaya Station

General information
- Location: Jalan Duri Kosambi Raya, Duri Kosambi, Cengkareng, West Jakarta; Jakarta; Indonesia
- Coordinates: 6.1631°S 106.7233°E
- Elevation: +6 m (20 ft)
- Owner: Kereta Api Indonesia
- Operator: KAI Commuter
- Lines: Duri–Tangerang railway; Soekarno–Hatta Airport Rail Link; Tangerang Line
- Platforms: 1 side platform and 1 island platform
- Tracks: 3

Construction
- Structure type: Ground
- Parking: Available
- Cycle facilities: Available
- Accessible: Yes

Other information
- Station code: RW • 0305
- Classification: Class III

History
- Opened: 1899; Airport Rail Link service 1 March 2024
- Rebuilt: 2014
- Electrified: 1997

Services
Preceding station		Following station
Duri towards Manggarai	Soekarno–Hatta Airport Commuter Line	Batu Ceper towards SHIA
Bojong Indah towards Duri	Tangerang Commuter Line	Kalideres towards Tangerang
Location
- Location within Jakarta

Rawa Buaya Station (RW) is a class III railway station located in Duri Kosambi, Cengkareng, West Jakarta. The station, which is located at an altitude of +6 meters, is included in the Jakarta Operational Area I and serves both the KRL Commuterline (Tangerang Line) and the Soekarno–Hatta Airport Rail Link. Despite its name, the station is not administratively located in Rawa Buaya sub-district, but rather just to the west of it.

Starting 1 March 2024, the Soekarno–Hatta Airport Rail Link began serving passengers at this station.

== Building and layout ==
Originally, this station only had two railway tracks with track 1 as the straight track. Following the completion of the double-track project on 8 June 2014, Rawa Buaya Station has three railway tracks: track 1 is a straight track heading towards Bojong Indah, track 2 serves as a stabling track for trains, and track 3 is a straight track heading towards Kalideres.

A03a T06 Rawa Buaya
G	North station entrance	
Platform floor	Line 3	← (Batu Ceper) Soekarno–Hatta Airport Rail Link to Soekarno–Hatta International Airport ← (Kalideres) Tangerang Line to Tangerang
Platform floor	Island platform, the doors are opened on the left side for Line 3, or on the right side for Line 2	
Platform floor	Line 2	Soekarno–Hatta Airport Rail Link to Manggarai (Duri) → ← (Kalideres) Tangerang Line to Tangerang and Duri (Bojong Indah) →
Platform floor	Line 1	Tangerang Line to Duri (Bojong Indah) →
Platform floor	Side platform, the doors are opened on the right side	
G	Main station building	

== Services ==
The following is a list of train services at Rawa Buaya Station.

=== Passenger services ===
- KAI Commuter
  - Airport Rail Link, to Manggarai and Soekarno–Hatta International Airport
  - Tangerang Line, to Duri and Tangerang

== Intermodal support ==
Public transport type	Station	Line	Destination
TransJakarta	N/A	JAK 50 (non-BRT; Mikrotrans Jak Lingko)	Kalideres Terminal–Puri Indah Mall
TransJakarta	N/A	JAK 80 (non-BRT; Mikrotrans Jak Lingko)	Rawa Buaya Station–Rawa Kompeni

== Controversy ==
A number of residents living near the station once practiced body therapy on the railway tracks because they believed it could cure illnesses such as heart disease, pneumonia, and diabetes. This practice became popular in 2011, stemming from a local "discovery" that the rails carried three volts of static electricity believed to possess healing properties. However, after PT Kereta Api Indonesia banned the activity, the practice was completely abandoned.

== Incidents ==
- On 20 October 2012, a KRL commuter train was blockaded at Rawa Buaya Station by dozens of protesters demonstrating against fare increases.
- On 29 March 2019, a man was struck and killed by a KRL train at the gated level crossing of Rawa Buaya Station.

== Gallery ==
The signboard of Rawa Buaya Station

The southern entrance of Rawa Buaya Station

Preceding station	Kereta Api Indonesia	Following station
Kalideres towards Duri	Duri–Tangerang	Bojong Indah towards Tangerang
