= Kalideres railway station =

Railway station in Indonesia

T07 Kalideres Station Stasiun Kalideres
- Kalideres Station, 2024

General information
- Location: Jalan Semanan Raya, Semanan, Kalideres, West Jakarta; Jakarta; Indonesia
- Coordinates: 6.1656°S 106.7042°E
- Elevation: +7 m (23 ft)
- Owner: Kereta Api Indonesia
- Operator: KAI Commuter
- Lines: Duri–Tangerang railway; Tangerang Line
- Platforms: 2 side platforms
- Tracks: 2

Construction
- Structure type: Ground
- Parking: Available
- Cycle facilities: Available
- Accessible: Yes

Other information
- Station code: KDS • 0304
- Classification: Class III

History
- Opened: 1899
- Electrified: 1997

Services
Preceding station		Following station
Rawa Buaya towards Duri	Tangerang Commuter Line	Poris towards Tangerang
Soekarno–Hatta Airport Commuter Line does not stop here
Location
- Location within Jakarta

Kalideres Station (KDS) is a class III railway station located in Semanan, Kalideres, West Jakarta. The station, which is located at an altitude of +7 meters, is included in the Jakarta Operational Area I and only serves the KRL Commuterline route. It is the westernmost railway station in Special Capital Region of Jakarta.

Only one train service stops at this station, which is the KRL Tangerang Line.

== Building and layout ==
This station has two railway tracks, both of which are straight tracks. Previously, the station was lined with disorderly street vendor stalls. However, since 2013, these vendors were relocated for the comfort of passengers at this station.

T07 Kalideres
G	Main building	
Platform floor	Side platform, the doors are opened on the right side	
Platform floor	Line 2	← (Poris) Tangerang Line to Tangerang
Platform floor	Line 1	Tangerang Line to Duri (Rawa Buaya) →
Platform floor	Side platform, the doors are opened on the right side	

== Services ==
The following is a list of train services at Kalideres Station.

=== Passenger services ===
- KAI Commuter
  - Tangerang Line, to Duri and Tangerang

== Intermodal support ==
Public transport type	Station	Line	Destination
TransJakarta	N/A	JAK 50 (non-BRT; Mikrotrans Jak Lingko)	Kalideres–Puri Kembangan

== Gallery ==
Signboard and platforms of Kalideres Station as of April 2021

Signboard at the entrance of Kalideres Station, August 2024

Preceding station	Kereta Api Indonesia	Following station
Poris towards Duri	Duri–Tangerang	Rawa Buaya towards Tangerang
