= Batu Ceper railway station =

Railway station in Indonesia

T09 A04 Batu Ceper Station Stasiun Batu Ceper
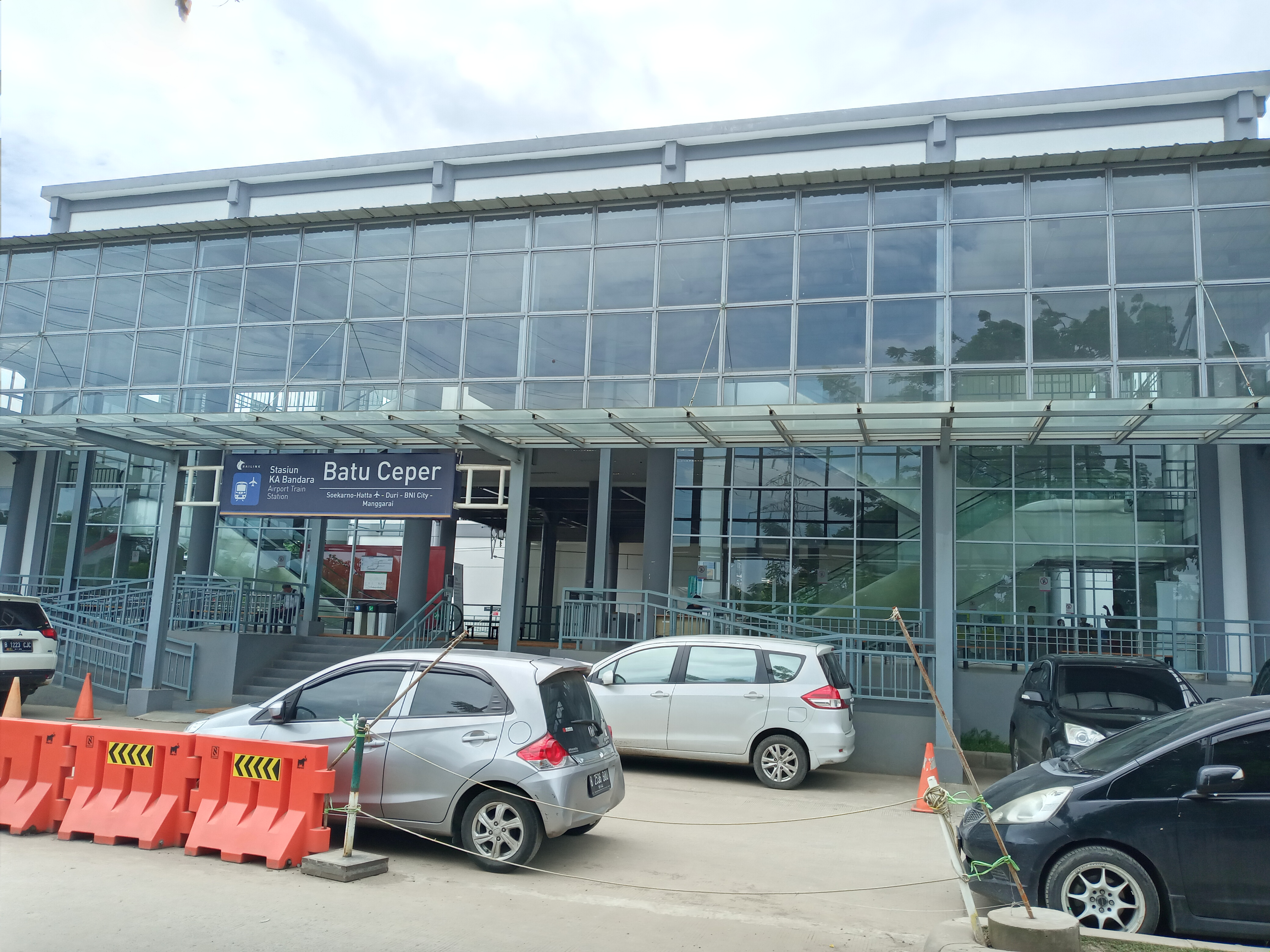
- Station entrance

General information
- Location: Tangerang; Banten; Indonesia
- Coordinates: 6.172205°S 106.665093°E
- Elevation: +11 m (36 ft)
- Owner: Kereta Api Indonesia
- Operator: KAI Commuter; KAI Bandara
- Lines: Duri–Tangerang railway; Tangerang Line; Soekarno-Hatta Line
- Platforms: 4 side platforms
- Tracks: 4

Construction
- Structure type: Ground
- Parking: Available
- Accessible: Available

Other information
- Station code: BPR • 0302
- Classification: Class I

Services
Preceding station		Following station
Poris towards Duri	Tangerang Commuter Line	Tanah Tinggi towards Tangerang
Rawa Buaya towards Manggarai	Soekarno–Hatta Airport Commuter Line	SHIA Terminus
Location
- Location within Jakarta Metropolitan Area

Batu Ceper Station (BPR) (Indonesian: Stasiun Batu Ceper) is a railway station located at Poris Plawad, Cipondoh, Tangerang, Indonesia. Although named as Batu Ceper, but the location of this station is not in the district of Batuceper, rather it is located at Cipondoh district of Tangerang. The station serves Greater Jakarta commuter rail and Soekarno–Hatta Airport Rail Link.

This station is located opposite of Poris Plawad Bus Terminal. Next to the old station building, a new station building is built to serve the Soekarno–Hatta Airport Rail Link service exclusively. The new station is equipped with facilities such as vending machine, turnstiles, escalator, ATM gallery, waiting lounge, commercial area, meeting room, and mosque.

== Building and layout ==
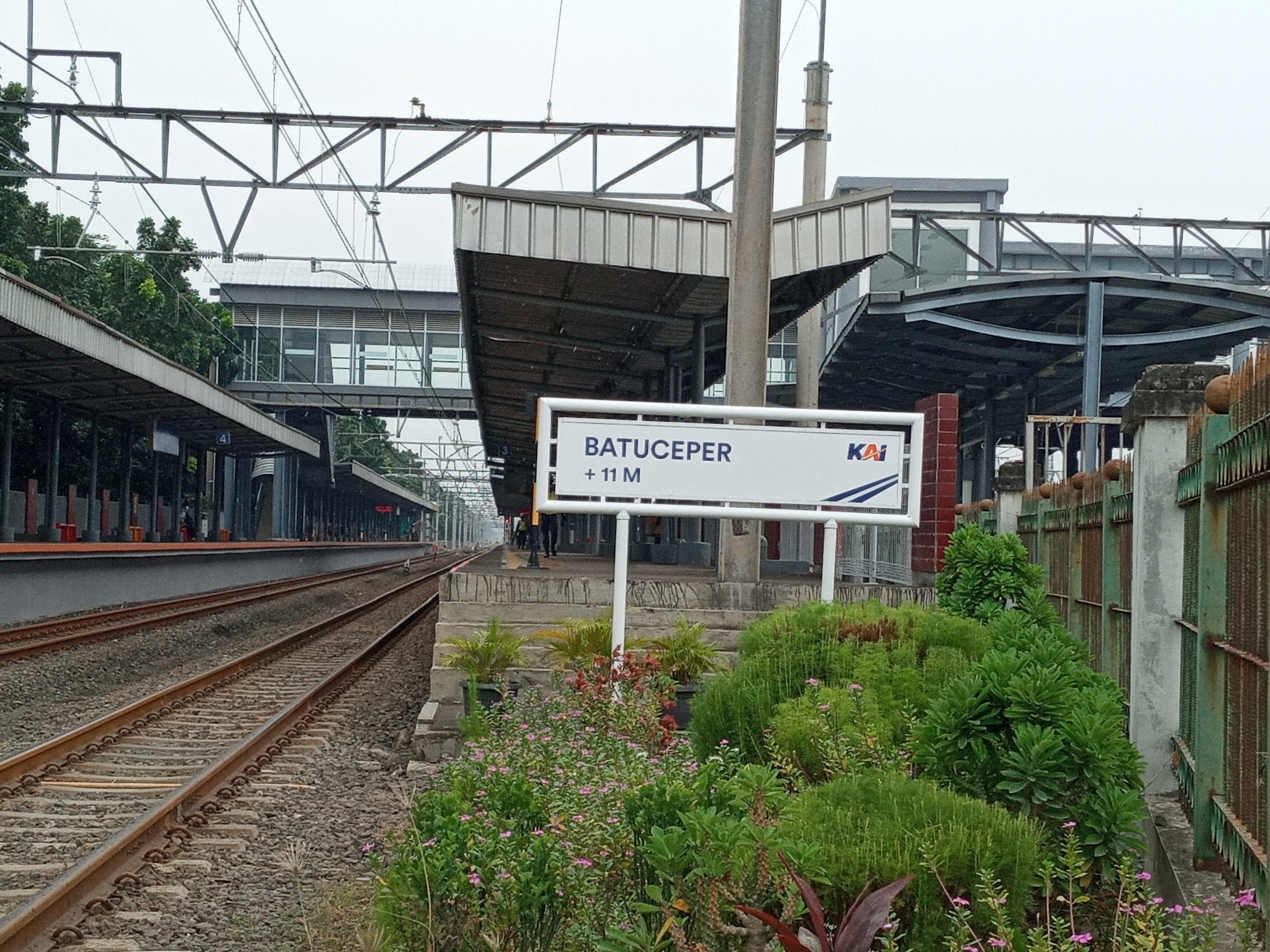
The signage of the station as of March 2021

The station building consists of two parts, namely the south side which is managed by KAI Commuter and the north side which is managed by KAI Bandara. Initially this station was just a single building on the south side and had two railway lines, both of which were straight tracks for KRL Commuterline stops. Since the completion of the construction of the branch line to the Soekarno–Hatta International Airport, the lines at this station have increased to four with the existing lines 1 and 2 being changed to lines 3 and 4. The new lines 1 and 2 are a straight line from and towards the airport.

The north side of the station building only serves Soekarno-Hatta Airport rail link trips. The station's new building began operations on 26 December 2017. Since 18 July 2019, the two buildings are connected by a pedestrian bridge.

A04 T09
G	Airport rail link building
P Platform floor	Side platform, the doors are opened on the right side
P Platform floor	Line 1	← (SHIA) Airport Rail Link to SHIA
P Platform floor	Line 2	Airport Rail Link to Rawa Buaya, then continue to Manggarai (Rawa Buaya) →
P Platform floor	Island platform, the doors are opened on the right side (on each train services)
P Platform floor	Line 3	← (Tanah Tinggi) Tangerang Line to Tangerang
P Platform floor	Line 4	Tangerang Line to Duri (Poris) →
P Platform floor	Side platform, the doors are opened on the right side
G	KRL Commuterline building

== Services ==
=== Passenger services ===
==== Airport rail link ====
Train line name	Destination	Notes
Airport Rail Link	SHIA	-
Airport Rail Link	Manggarai	-

==== Commuterline ====
Train line name	Destination	Notes
Tangerang Line	Tangerang	-
Tangerang Line	Duri	-

== Supporting transportation ==
Type	Route	Destination
TransJakarta	T11	Poris Plawad Bus Terminal–Bundaran Senayan (integrated with corridors)
TransJakarta	T12	Poris Plawad Bus Terminal–Juanda (integrated with corridors)
Trans Kota Tangerang (BRT)	TT1	Poris Plawad Bus Terminal–Jatake
Trans Kota Tangerang (BRT)	TT2	Poris Plawad Bus Terminal–Cibodas/PAM Bus Terminal (via Imam Bonjol–Kavling Pemda)
Transjabodetabek	TJ1 (regular)	Poris Plawad Bus Terminal–Blok M Bus Terminal
Transjabodetabek	TJ2 (regular)	Poris Plawad Bus Terminal–Kampung Rambutan Bus Terminal
Transjabodetabek	x1 (premium)	Poris Plawad Bus Terminal–Jakarta Fair (via Letjen S. Parman–Kyai Tapa–Hayam Wuruk–Pos)
Angkot	B01	Poris Plawad Bus Terminal–Cengkareng
Angkot	B02	Poris Plawad Bus Terminal–Ciledung (via K.H. Hasyim Asyhari)
Angkot	B02A	Poris Plawad Bus Terminal–Ciledug (via H.R Rasuna Said (Cipete))
Angkot	R01	Poris Plawad Bus Terminal–Jatiuwung
Angkot	R02	Poris Plawad Bus Terminal–Cibodasari
Angkot	R03	Poris Plawad Bus Terminal–Plaza Kotabumi
Angkot	R03A	Poris Plawad Bus Terminal–Serpong Station
Angkot	R04	Poris Plawad Bus Terminal–Selapajang Jaya
Angkot	R05	Poris Plawad Bus Terminal–Kebon Besar
Angkot	T08	Poris Plawad Bus Terminal–Sangiang Jaya
Angkot	R10	Poris Plawad Bus Terminal–Cipondoh lake
Angkot	T07 (loop line)	Poris Plawad Bus Terminal–Pasar Anyar–Tangcity Mall
Angkot	R11	Poris Plawad Bus Terminal– Bencongan (via Jalan Beringin Raya–Jalan Cemara Raya)
Angkot	R14	Poris Plawad Bus Terminal–Bencongan (via Jalan Teuku Umar–Jalan Gatot Subroto)
Angkot	T25	Poris Plawad Bus Terminal–Daan Mogot Mall
Angkot	R06A	Poris Plawad Bus Terminal–Bojong Nangka
Angkot	B09	Poris Plawad Bus Terminal–Dadap
Angkot	K17	Poris Plawad Bus Terminal–Kampung Melayu Timur

== See also ==
- Soekarno–Hatta International Airport
- Jakarta Metro Commuter Rail

Preceding station	Kereta Api Indonesia	Following station
Poris towards Duri	Duri–Tangerang	Tanah Tinggi towards Tangerang
Terminus	BPR–BST	SHIA; Terminus
