= Duri–Tangerang railway =

Railway line in Indonesia

- The Tangerang–Duri railway line in 1979

Overview
- Native name: Jalur kereta api Duri–Tangerang
- Status: Operational
- Owner: PT Kereta Api Indonesia
- Locale: Jakarta; Banten
- Termini: Duri; Tangerang
- Stations: 8

Service
- Type: Commuter rail
- Operator(s): KA Commuter Jabodetabek

History
- Opened: 1899

Technical
- Number of tracks: 2
- Track gauge: 1,067 mm (3 ft 6 in)
- Electrification: 1.5 kV DC overhead line

The Duri–Tangerang railway (Indonesian: Jalur kareta api Duri–Tangerang) is a railway connecting Tangerang to Jakarta, the capital city of Indonesia. It was constructed during the Dutch colonial age, as a branch line from the Jakarta Kota-Anyer Kidul railway. The railway is serviced by KA Commuter Jabodetabek's Tangerang line.

== History ==
The public railway company Staatsspoorwegen built the line in 1899 as part of the Western railways (Dutch: Westerlijnen) in order to improve connections with the western regions of the island of Java.

On 2 January 1899 the first part of the Jakarta Kota-Anyer Kidul mainline was opened between Batavia Zuid (Jakarta Kota) and Tangerang. After completing the railway in the following year, the line between Duri and Tangerang remained as a mere branch line.

The entire railway is currently electrified with 1.5 kV DC overhead lines, accommodating the electric commuter trains of KA Commuter Jabodetabek's Brown line. An additional track was added in 2012, resulting in a double track along the entire stretch between Tangerang and Duri.

In order to connect Jakarta's main airport to the railway network, a line branching off at Batu Ceper railway station was being constructed and began operation in 2018.

== Stations ==
There are eleven stations on the line.

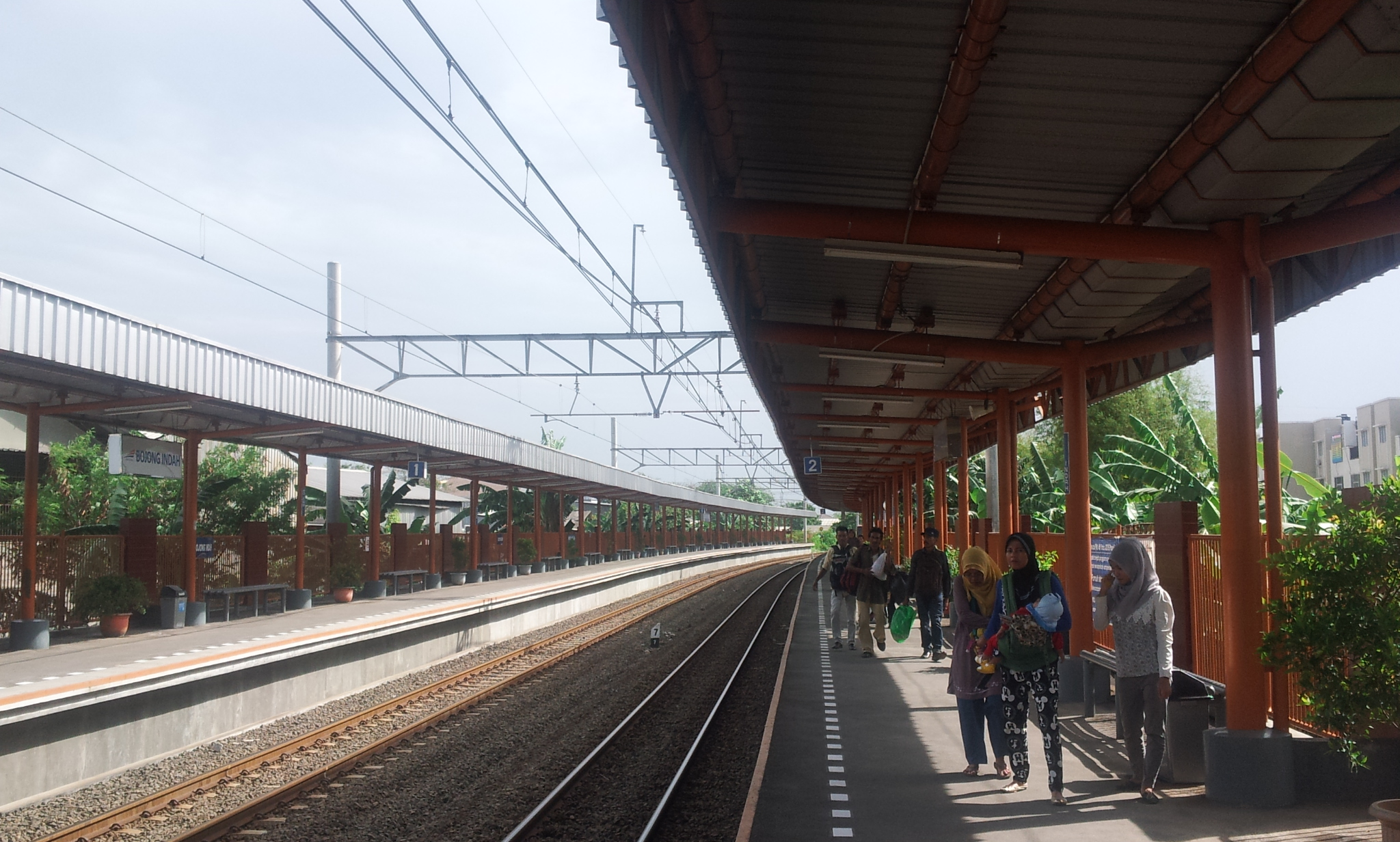
Bojong Indah Station

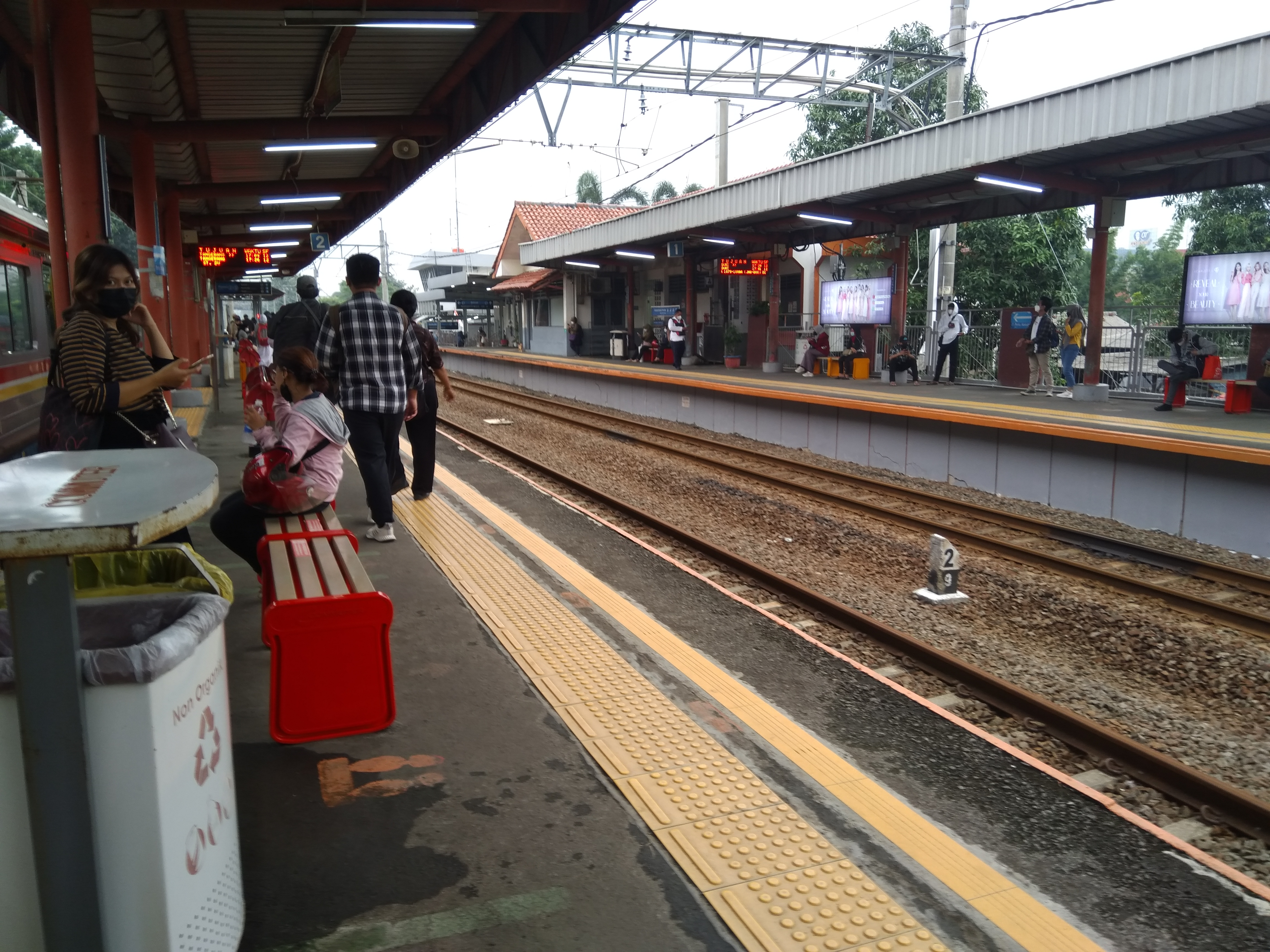
Rawa Buaya Station

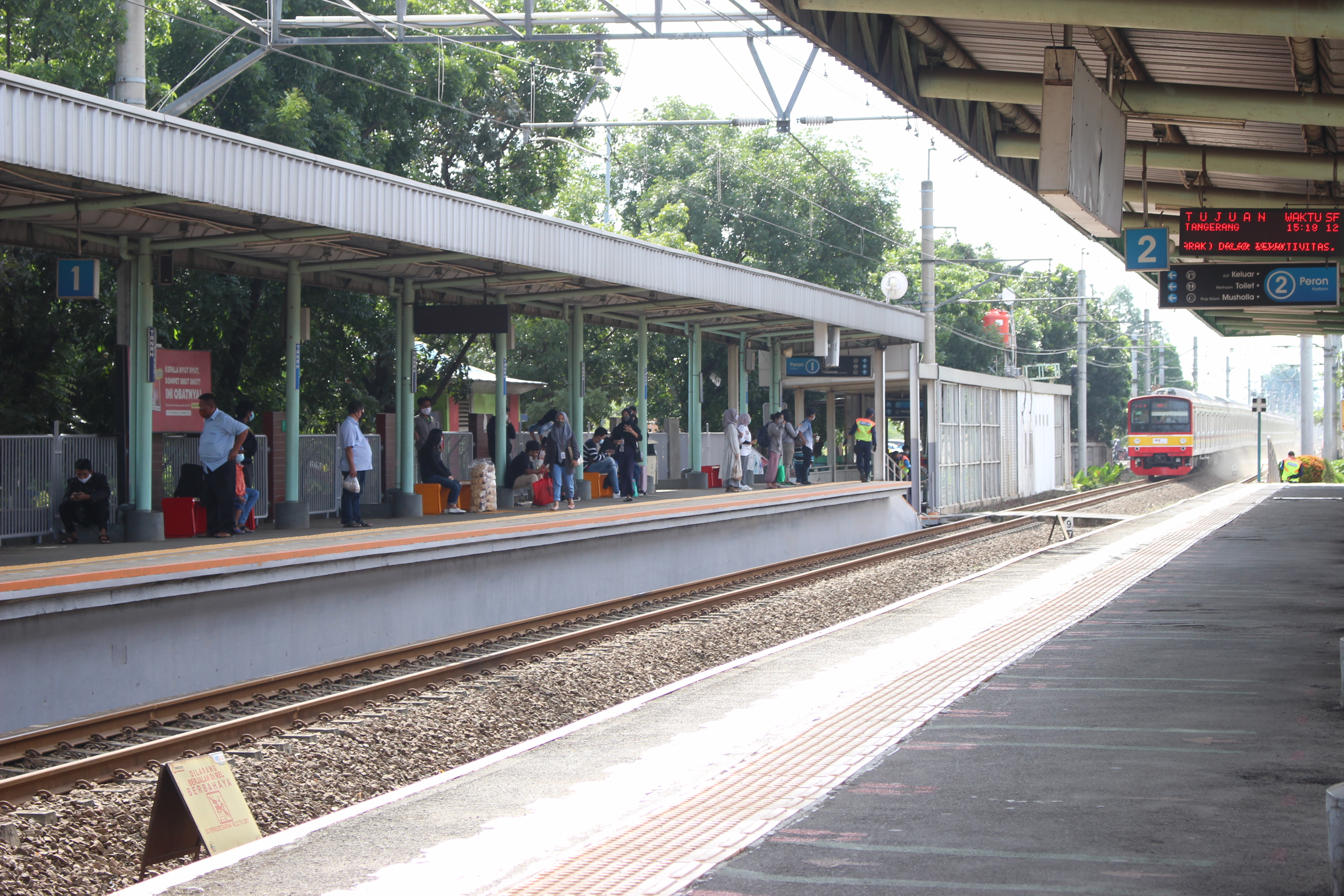
Tanah Tinggi Station in 2020

- Duri
- Grogol
- Pesing
- Taman Kota, (formerly Kembangan)
- Bojong Indah railway station
- Rawa Buaya railway station
- Kalideres
- Poris
- Batu Ceper; connecting with a branch line to Soekarno-Hatta International Airport
- Tanah Tinggi railway station
- Tangerang

== Services ==
- KA Commuter Jabodetabek: Brown line (Duri-Tangerang)
