= Soekarno–Hatta Airport Skytrain =

Skytrain

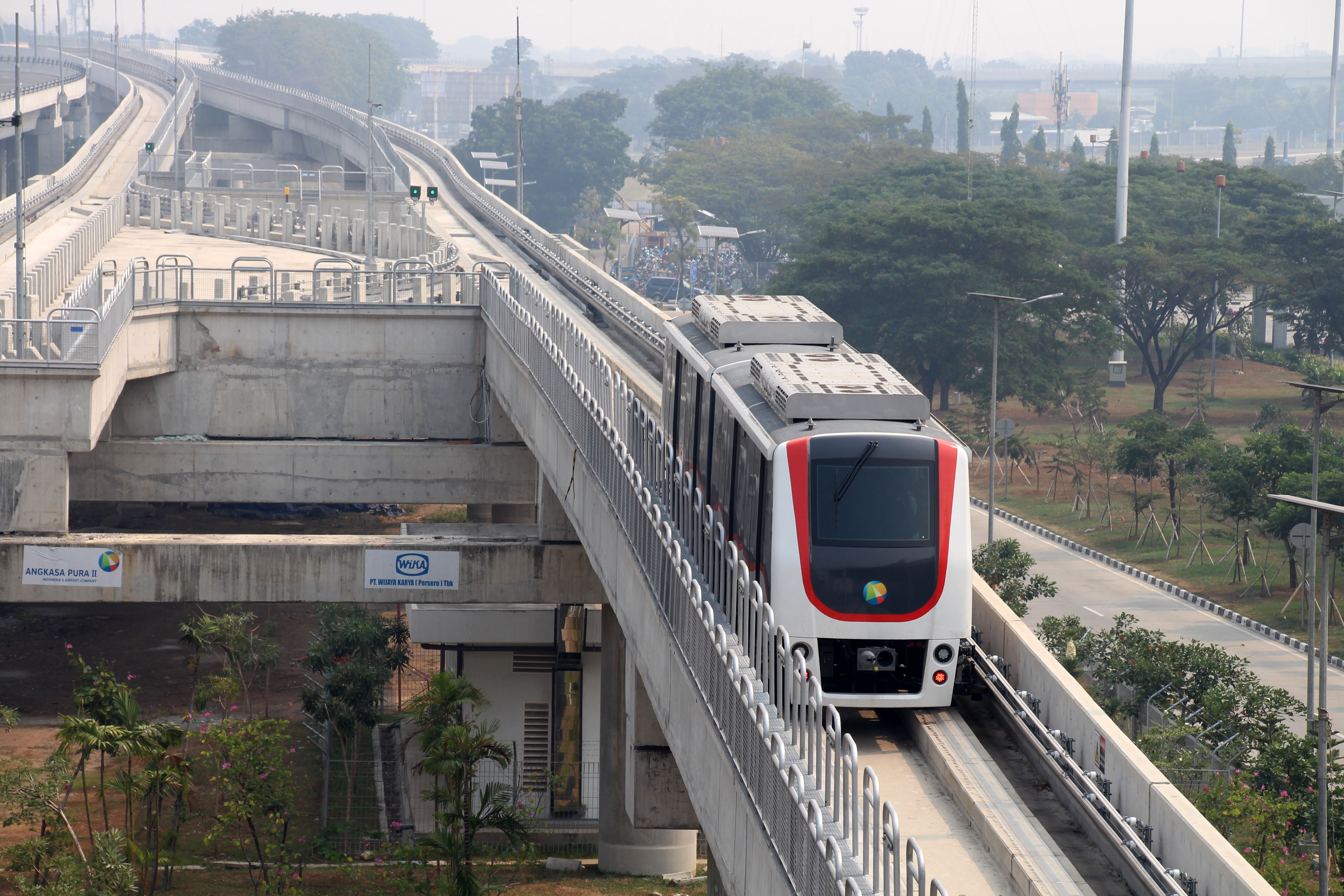
- Soekarno-Hatta Airport Skytrain used for airport terminals shuttle service

Overview
- Native name: Kalayang Bandara Internasional Soekarno-Hatta
- Status: Operational
- Owner: Angkasa Pura II
- Locale: Soekarno–Hatta International Airport complex
- Stations: 4

Service
- Type: Automated people mover (APM)
- Operator: Angkasa Pura II
- Rolling stock: Woojin Automated People Mover System

History
- Opened: 17 September 2017; 9 years ago

Technical
- Line length: 3.05 km (1.90 mi)
- Electrification: Third rail
- Operating speed: 60 km/h (37 mph)

The Soekarno–Hatta Airport Skytrain (Indonesian: Kalayang Bandara Soekarno–Hatta) is a semi-driverless 3.05 kilometre Automated People Mover System (APMS) which connects Soekarno-Hatta International Airport Terminals 1, 2, 3 and SHIA railway station, free of charge. Trains are spaced 5 minutes apart, with 7 minutes needed to get from Terminal 1 to Terminal 3. The trains are only available on the landside.

== Rolling stock ==
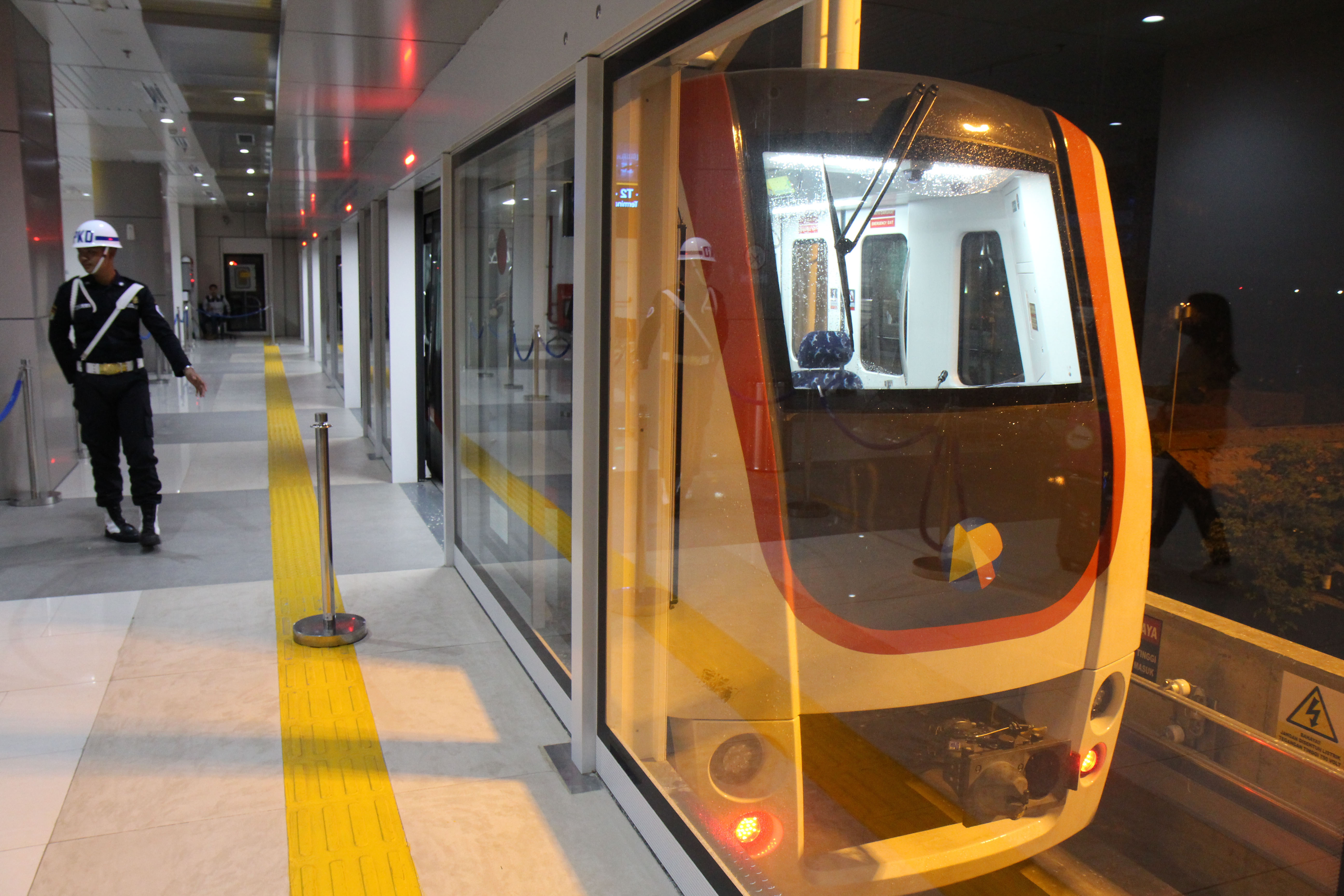
Automated People Mover System at Terminal 1 Station

The system uses Airport Automated People Mover System rubber-tyred metro manufactured by state-owned enterprise PT LEN Industri in cooperation with South Korean Woojin Industries. Three train units operate with each train unit consisting of two cars. They are capable to transport 176 passengers in one trip. The train travels at a speed of 60 kilometers per hour. Each trainset is equipped with automated guide-way transit (AGT) technology. The system is capable for automated operations, but its implementation have been delayed pending trials conducted by LEN Industri.

== Stations ==
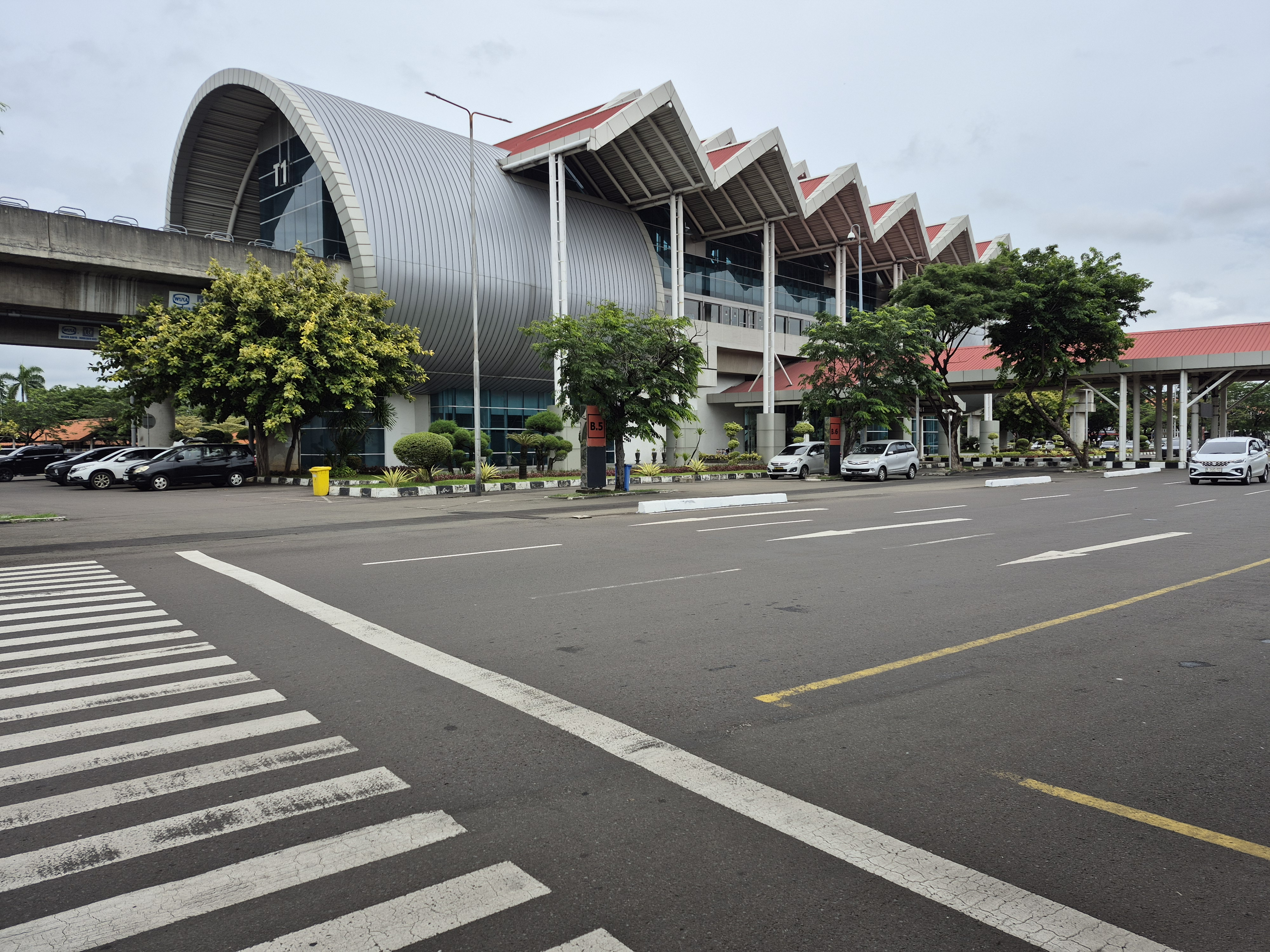
Skytrain Terminal 1 Station

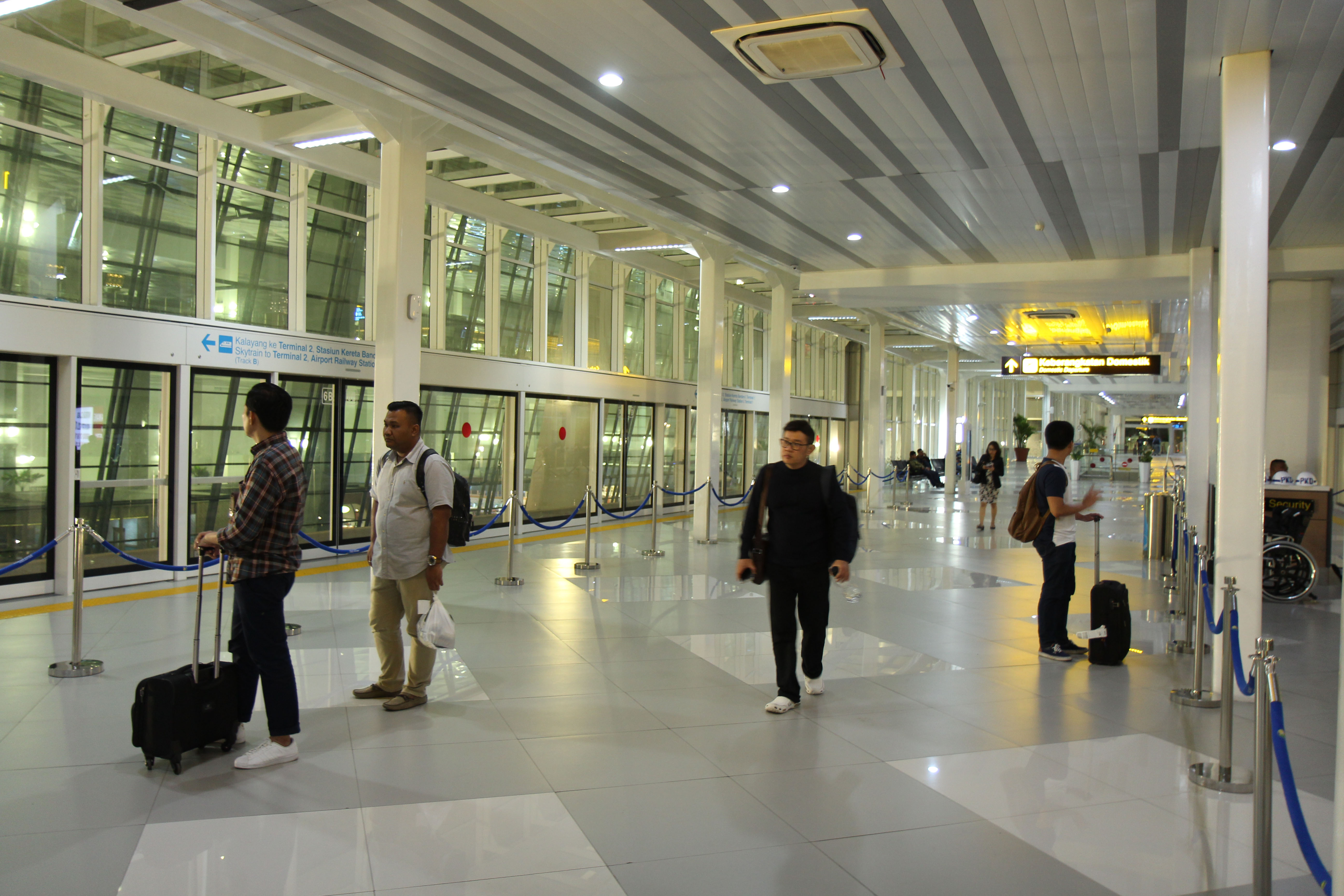
Skytrain Terminal 3 Station

There are 4 stations served by Airport Skytrain; Terminal 1, 2 and 3 each has one station. The airport shuttle Skytrain is integrated to SHIA railway station, from where passengers can conveniently travel to–and from–Jakarta city center by Soekarno–Hatta Airport Rail Link.

Skytrain operating schedule is accessible online and through the Indonesia Airport website and smartphone application, the time was variable . All Skytrain stations are equipped with platform screen doors and have information screens displaying real-time arrival time of the next train. Skytrain has been operational since 17 September 2017.

Station	Transfer/Notes
Terminal 3	Terminal station Soekarno-Hatta Terminal 3 Terminal 3 Airport Bus Terminal
Terminal 2	Soekarno-Hatta Terminal 2 Terminal 2 Airport Bus Terminal
Integrated Building	SHIA Soekarno–Hatta Airport Commuter Line
Terminal 1	Terminal Station Soekarno-Hatta Terminal 1

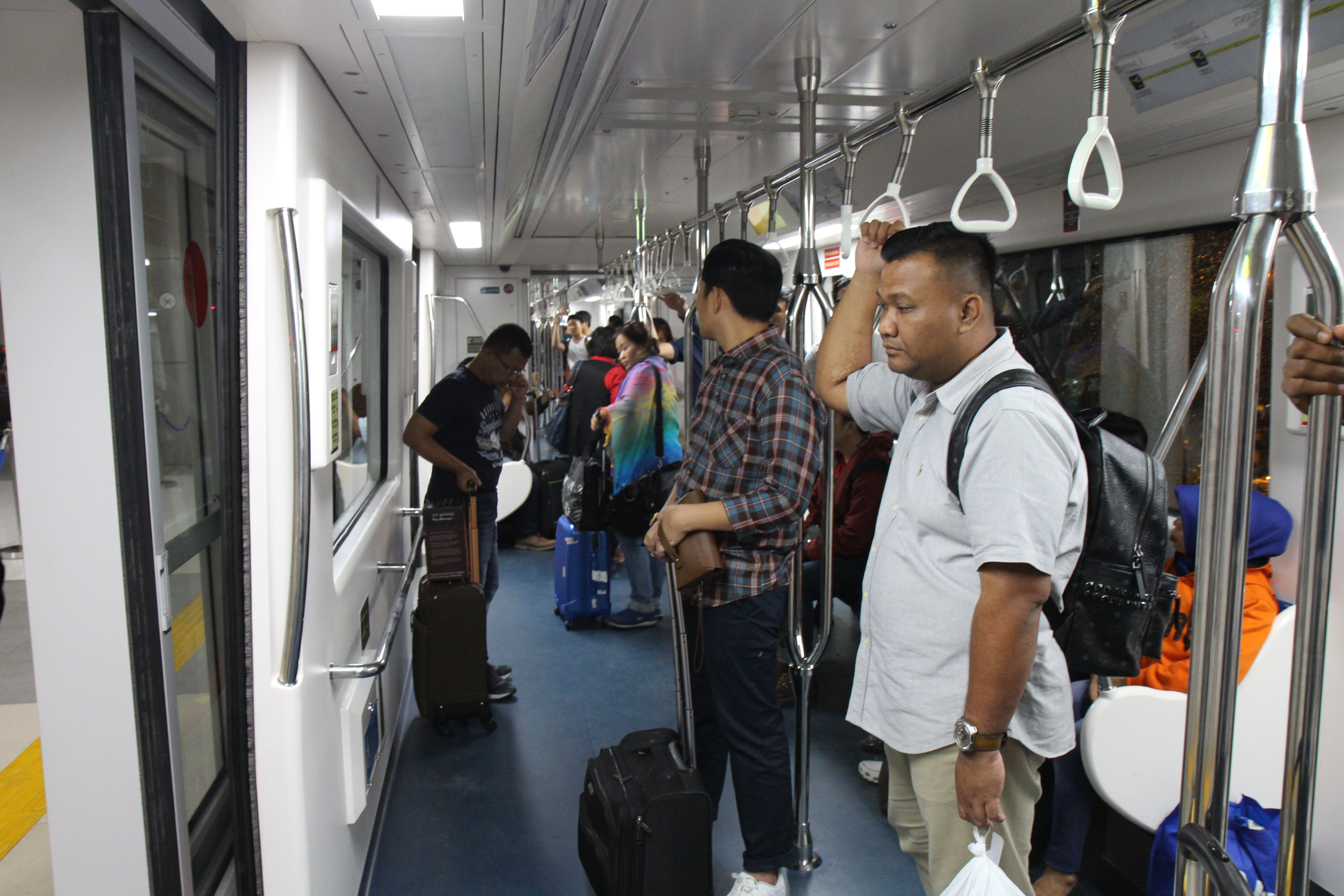
Skytrain passengers
