= KAI Commuter Tangerang Line =

Commuter rail line in Indonesia

Tangerang Commuter Line Tangerang Line
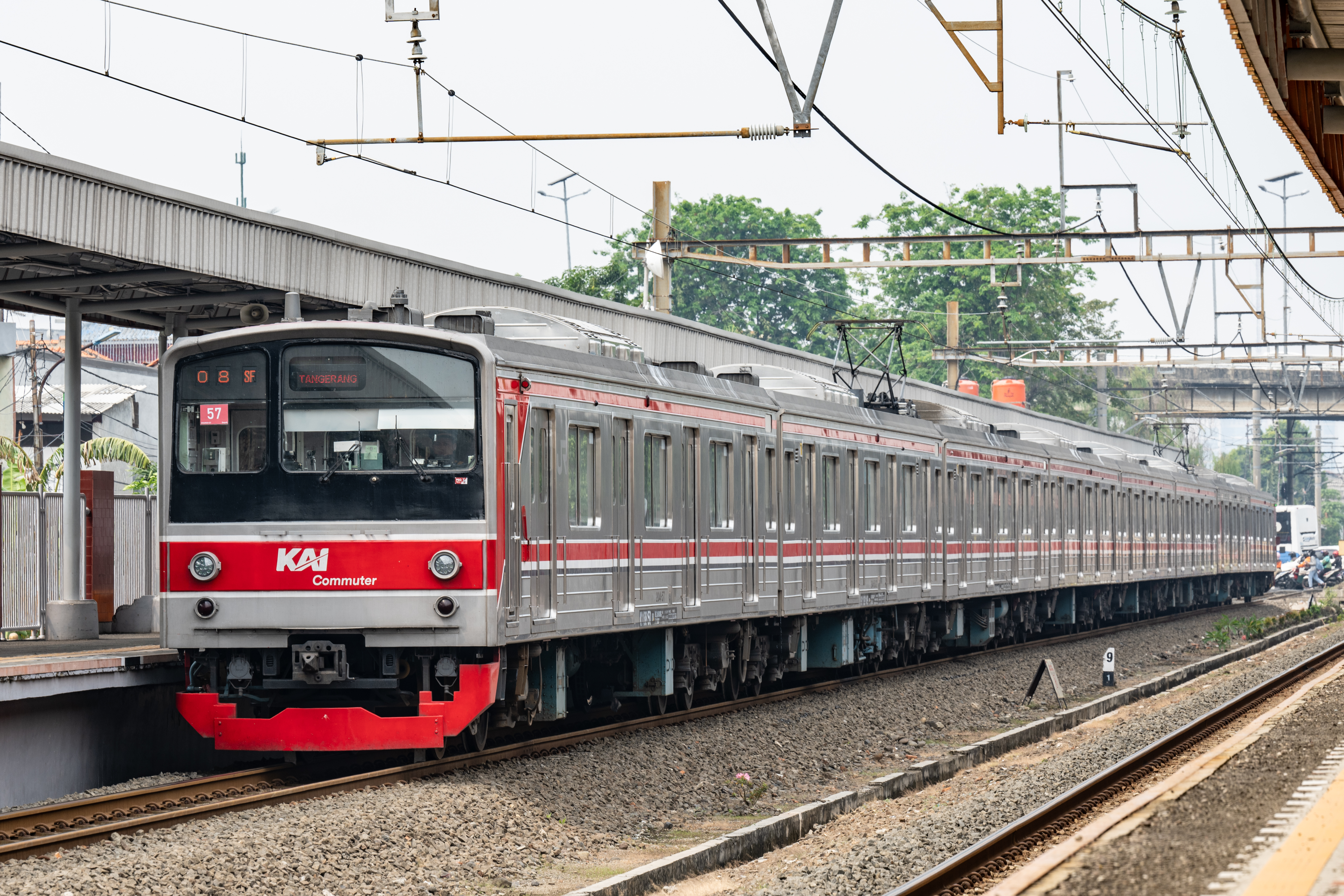
- 205 series at Grogol station

Overview
- Status: Operational
- Owner: Kereta Api Indonesia
- Locale: West Jakarta; Tangerang, Banten
- Termini: Duri; Tangerang
- Stations: 11
- Website: www.krl.co.id

Service
- Type: Commuter rail
- System: KRL Commuterline
- Services: 1
- Operator: KAI Commuter
- Depot(s): Bukit Duri; Depok
- Rolling stock: 205 series Tokyo Metro 6000 series

History
- Opened: 1899 (original); 1997 (electrified); 5 December 2011 (as 'Brown Line')

Technical
- Line length: 19.297 km (11.991 mi)
- Number of tracks: Double-track
- Track gauge: 1,067 mm (3 ft 6 in)
- Electrification: 1,500 V DC overhead line

The Tangerang Line (also known as KRL Commuterline Duri–Tangerang), officially the Tangerang Commuter Line, is a commuter rail line in Indonesia, operated by PT Kereta Commuter Indonesia (KCI). The line operate on the Duri–Tangerang segment, which connects Duri station in West Jakarta and Tangerang station in Tangerang City, Banten. On maps and diagrams, the line is shown using the colour "brown" ( ).

== Route patterns ==
There is a single service pattern serving the entire line.

Service pattern	Route	Listed as	Stations served
Duri–Tangerang	Towards Tangerang: Duri → Batu Ceper → Tangerang; Towards Duri: Tangerang → Batu Ceper → Duri	Towards Tangerang: "Tangerang"; Towards Duri railway station: "Duri railway station"	11 stations from Duri to Tangerang (bidirectional)

== Stations ==
The distance table of Commuterline stations.

Station		Distance (km)		Transfers/ Notes		Location	
Code	Name	From previous station	From Jakarta Termini	Transfers/ Notes		Location	
T01 C09 A03	Duri	-	0.0	KAI Commuter Cikarang Loop Line Soekarno–Hatta Airport Rail Link	Terminal station Interchange station to or	West Jakarta	Jakarta
T02	Grogol	1.700	1.700		Kali Grogol	West Jakarta	Jakarta
T03	Pesing	2.036	3.736		Damai Stasiun Pesing	West Jakarta	Jakarta
T04	Taman Kota	1.514	5.250		Taman Kota	West Jakarta	Jakarta
T05	Bojong Indah	2.434	7.684			West Jakarta	Jakarta
T06 A04	Rawa Buaya	1.152	8.836	Soekarno–Hatta Airport Rail Link	Interchange station to	West Jakarta	Jakarta
T07	Kalideres	2.504	11.340			West Jakarta	Jakarta
T08	Poris	2.548	13.888			Tangerang	Banten
T09 A05	Batu Ceper	1.800	15.688	Soekarno–Hatta Airport Rail Link	Interchange station to K1 K2 Terminal Poris Plawad Poris Plawad Bus Terminal (via short walk)	Tangerang	Banten
T10	Tanah Tinggi	2.000	17.688		K1 K2 Stasiun Tanah Tinggi	Tangerang	Banten
T11	Tangerang	1.609	19.297		Terminal station K1 K4 Robinson	Tangerang	Banten

== Rolling stock ==
- Ex-JR East 205 series (2013–present)
- Ex-Tokyo Metro 6000 series (2011–present)

== Accidents and incidents ==
=== Pre-2011 route and services reform ===
- 19 August 2000, a KRL Hitachi trainset running KA 628 (Economy class) from Jakarta Kota to Tangerang was hit from behind by Indocement coal train no. KA 228 en route between Kampung Bandan and Angke stations. Three people died on this accident including two train crews on both trains. The Hitachi train involved was stored for a long time afterward, before being scrapped. On a further note, this line used to continue from Duri all the way to Kota before 2011.
