= SHIA railway station =

Railway station in Indonesia

A05 SHIA Station Soekarno–Hatta International Airport Station Stasiun Bandara Soekarno–Hatta

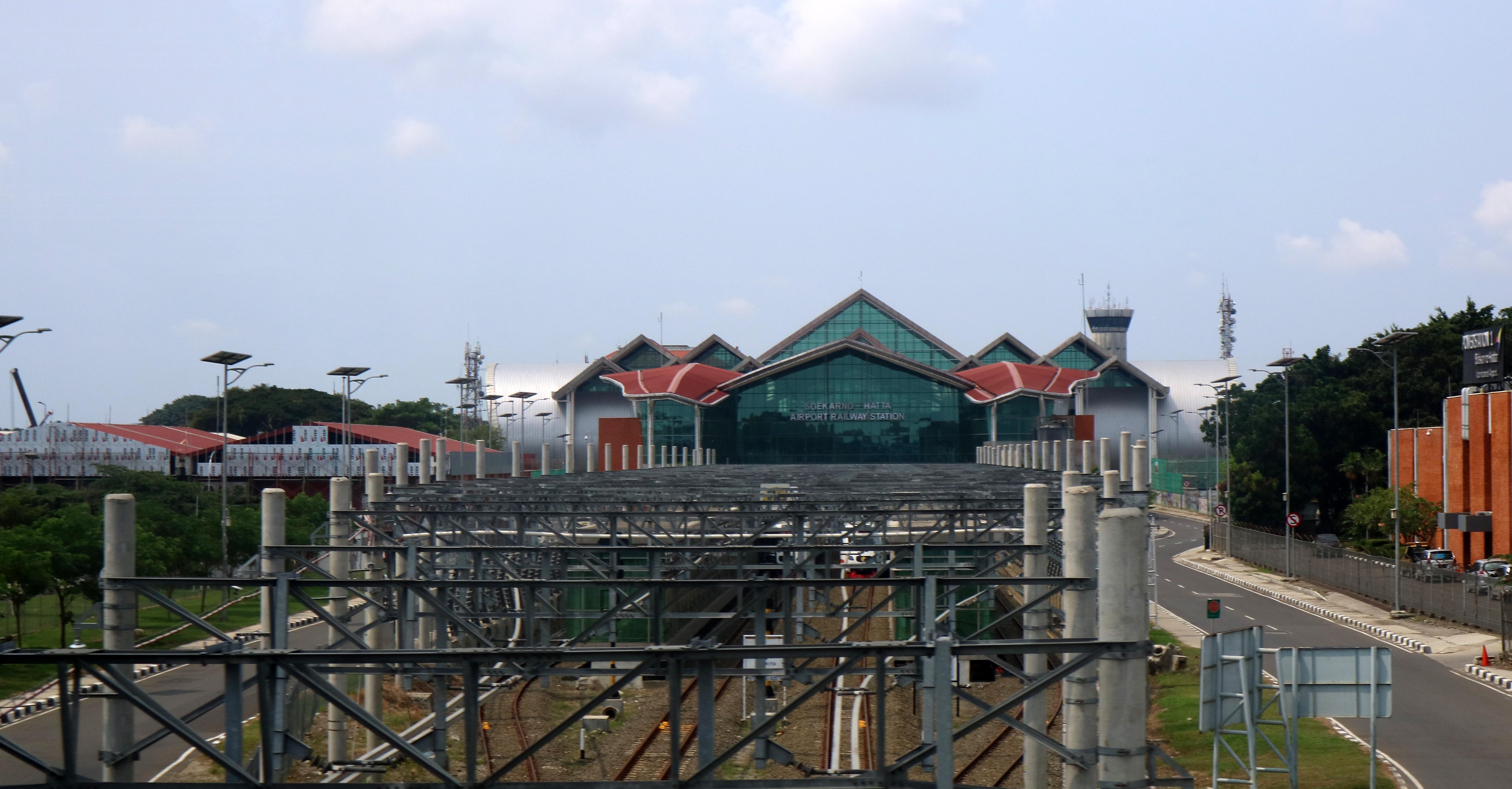
- West view

General information
- Location: Between Soekarno–Hatta International Airport Terminal 1 & Terminal 2 Banten; Indonesia
- Coordinates: 6.127382°S 106.652205°E
- Owner: Kereta Api Indonesia
- Operator: KAI Bandara (2017-2022); KAI Commuter (2023-present)
- Lines: Soekarno-Hatta Line; SHIA Skytrain
- Platforms: 2 island platforms
- Tracks: 4

Construction
- Structure type: Ground
- Parking: Available
- Accessible: Available

Other information
- Station code: BST
- IATA code: CGK
- Classification: Class I

History
- Opened: 26 December 2017

Services
Preceding station		Following station
Batu Ceper towards Manggarai	Soekarno–Hatta Airport Commuter Line	Terminus
Location
- Location within Jakarta Metropolitan Area

SHIA Station or Soekarno–Hatta International Airport Station (BST) (Indonesian: Stasiun Bandara Soekarno–Hatta) is a railway station within the Soekarno–Hatta International Airport complex in Tangerang, Banten, Indonesia, serving the Soekarno–Hatta Airport Commuter Line and inter-terminal airport skytrain. It is located between the airport's Terminal 1 to the south and Terminal 2 to the north.

This station serves airport passengers going to Batu Ceper Station, Duri Station, BNI City Station, to Manggarai Station. The station began serving passengers on 26 December 2017 and was inaugurated on 2 January 2018.

== Building and layout ==
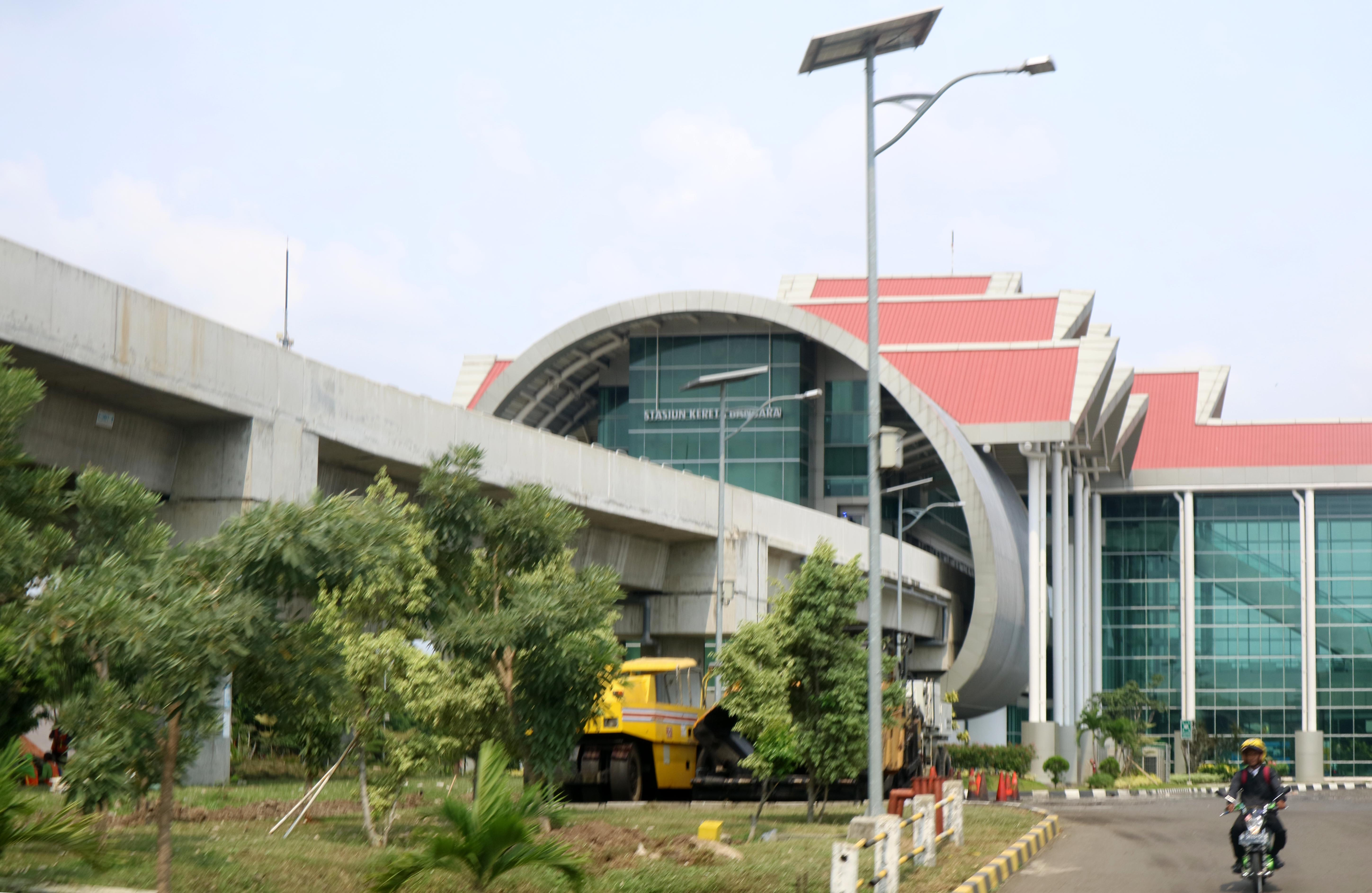
The airport skytrain station building on the upper floor

SHIA station is nestled in an integrated building, which can accommodate about 3500 passengers. The station has two platforms, both equipped with full-height platform screen doors. There are a passenger lobby, four escalators and two elevators placed across the terminal building. The station is equipped with facilities such as ticket counters (only Debit or Credit Card is acceptable), public spaces, electronic gates, waiting rooms, commercial rooms, restrooms, prayer rooms, the rail administrator room, and a skytrain station. The station yard can accommodate four trains of 10 carriages.

The ground floor of the building is fully used for the Soekarno-Hatta Airport rail link station. The airport skytrain station is located on the upper level. The ARS emplacement has four lines, with lines 2 and 3 are straight tracks.

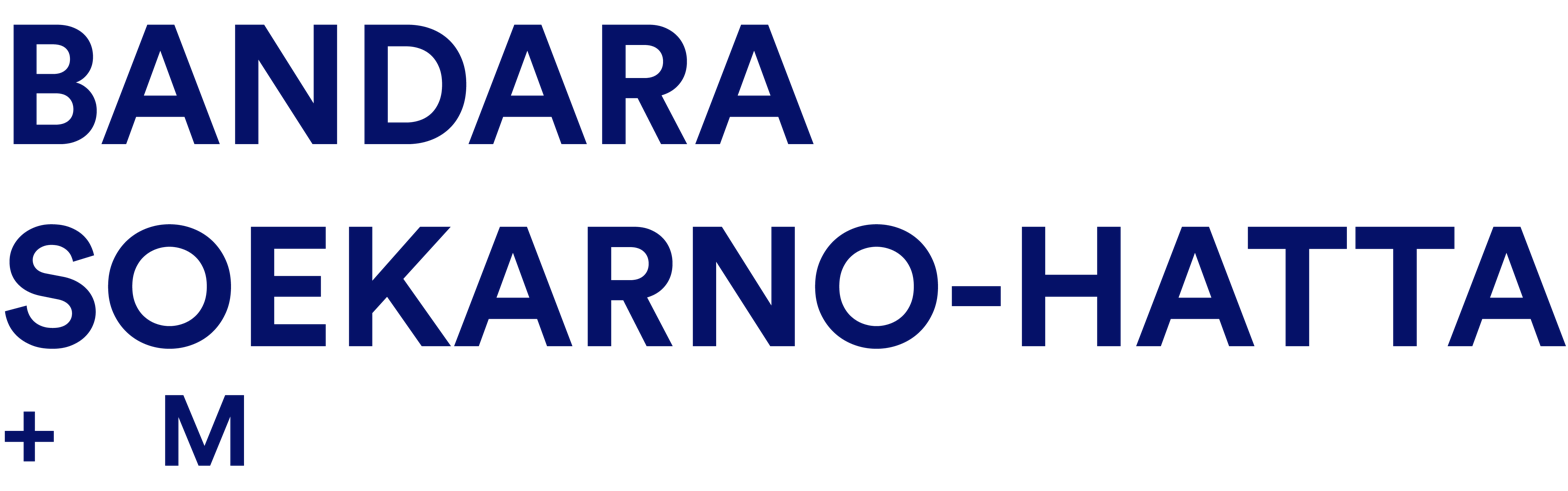
A05
Station Hall	Line 1	Airport Rail Link to Manggarai (Batu Ceper) →
Station Hall	Bay platform
Station Hall	Line 2	Airport Rail Link to Manggarai (Batu Ceper) →
Station Hall	Line 3	Airport Rail Link to Manggarai (Batu Ceper) →
Station Hall	Bay platform
Station Hall	Line 4	Airport Rail Link to Manggarai (Batu Ceper) →

== Services ==
=== Passenger services ===
==== Airport rail link ====
Train line name	Destination	Notes
Airport Rail Link	Manggarai	-
Airport Rail Link	SHIA	-

==== Airport skytrain ====
- Airport Skytrain to Terminal 1, 2, and 3.

== Supporting transportation ==
=== Buses ===
System	Route	Destination	Notes
Transjakarta	(non-BRT)	Kalideres Terminal – Perkantoran Soekarno–Hatta	The final terminus is located at the airport office complex near the station (hence the name 'Perkantoran Soekarno–Hatta'). Both routes does not stop at all three passenger terminals, but a shuttle service is provided to connect them with the terminals.
Transjakarta	(non-BRT)	Blok M Terminal – Perkantoran Soekarno–Hatta	The final terminus is located at the airport office complex near the station (hence the name 'Perkantoran Soekarno–Hatta'). Both routes does not stop at all three passenger terminals, but a shuttle service is provided to connect them with the terminals.
Shuttle bus service	Free	TOD M1—ACS—T2—Stasiun KA Bandara—Bundaran Kargo—Terminal 3—Terminal 1—ACD—TOD M1	The free service route utilize Transjakarta's premium service fleet called 'Royaltrans.'
Shuttle bus service	Paid	TOD M1—ACS—MPS—T2—Parkir Inap 1—Stasiun KA Bandara—Imigrasi—Terminal Kargo—Terminal 3—Terminal 1—ACD—TOD M1	The paid service route is operating with bus fleets owned by Big Bird, a subsidiary of the national taxicab company Bluebird Group

== Incidents ==
- On 5 February 2018, This station was temporarily closed considering that there was a landslide around the airport which caused the airport rail link to temporarily stop operating. The airport rail link service was restored three days later on 8 February 2018.

== Gallery ==
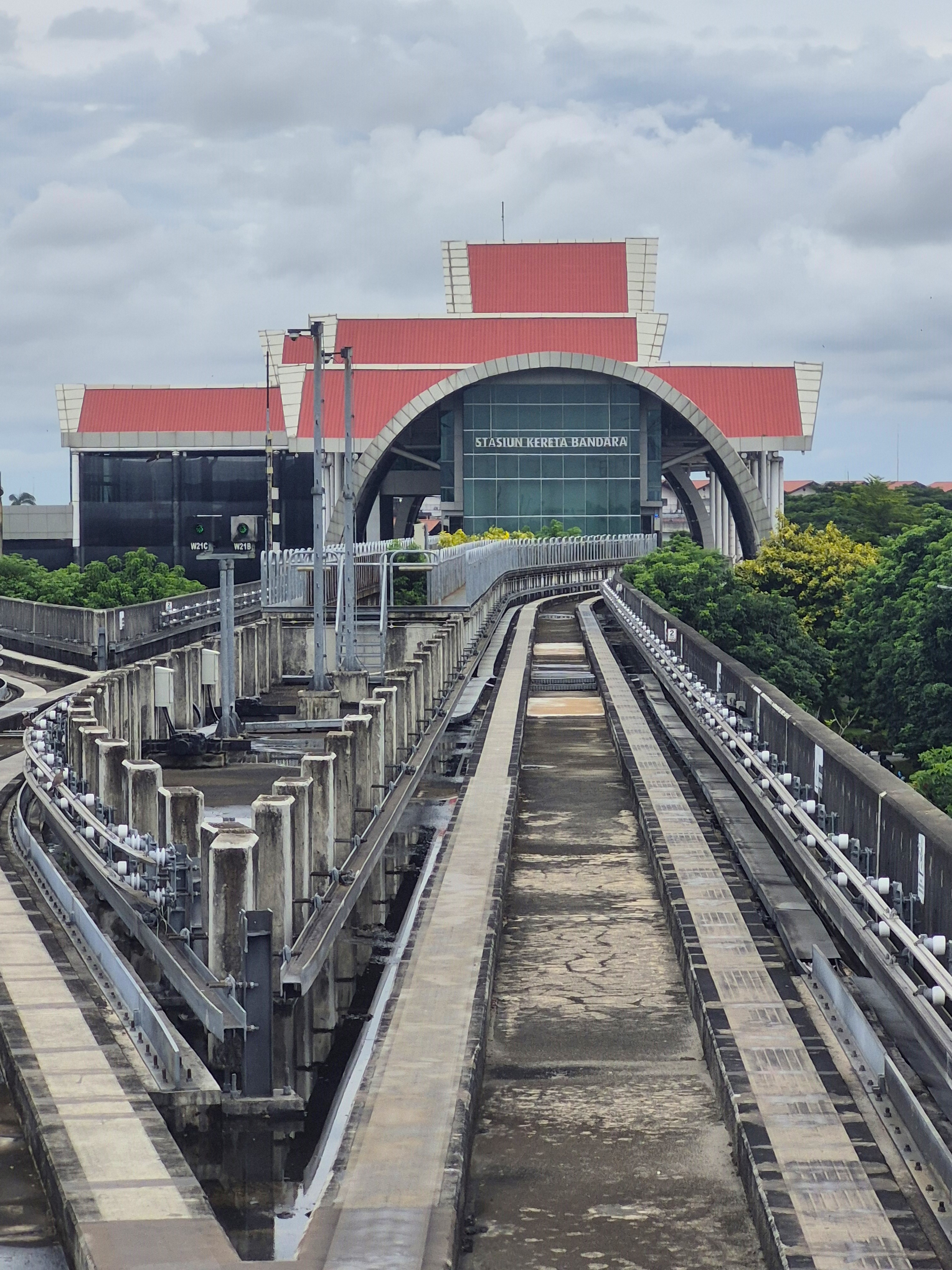
The building seen from the airport skytrain

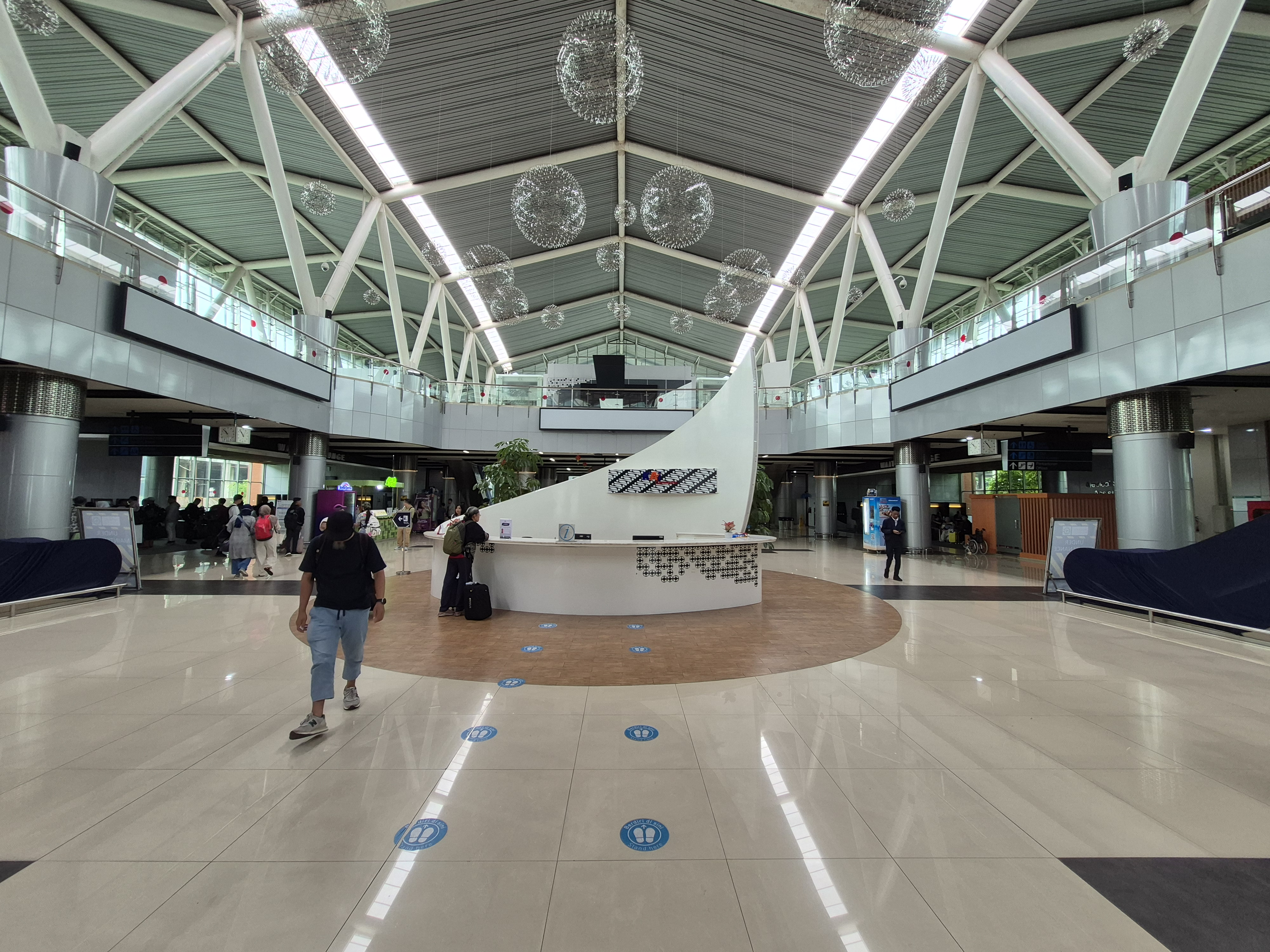
Interior of the station

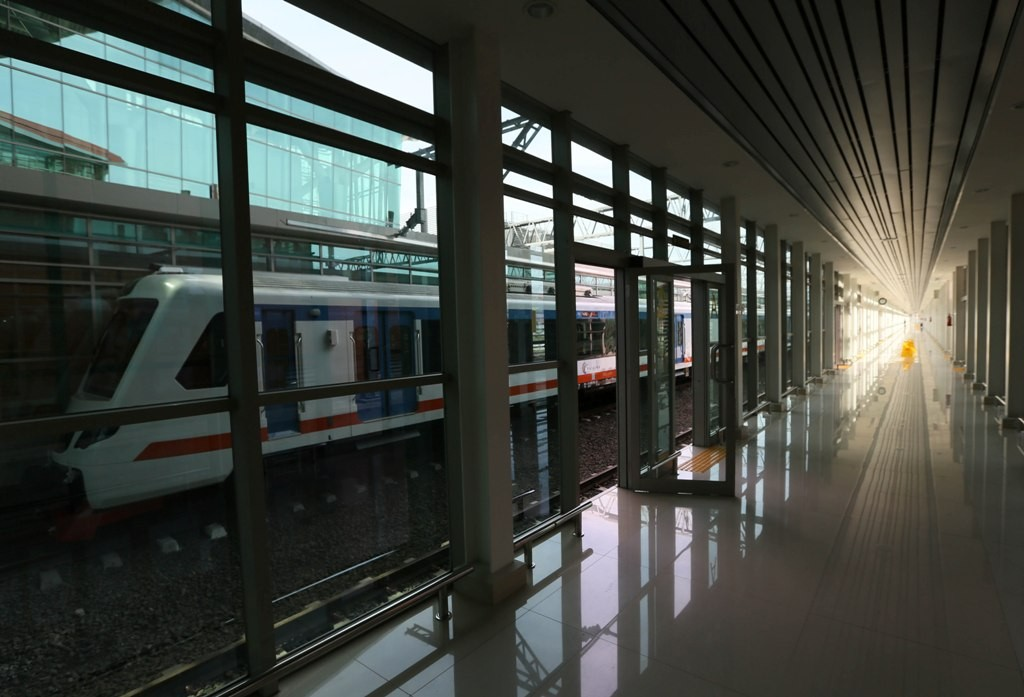
The platform area

== See also ==
- Soekarno–Hatta International Airport
- KRL Commuterline

Preceding station	Kereta Api Indonesia	Following station
Batu Ceper; Terminus	BPR–BST	Terminus
