= Soekarno–Hatta Airport Commuter Line =

Airport rail link in Indonesia

Soekarno–Hatta Airport Commuter Line Soekarno–Hatta Line
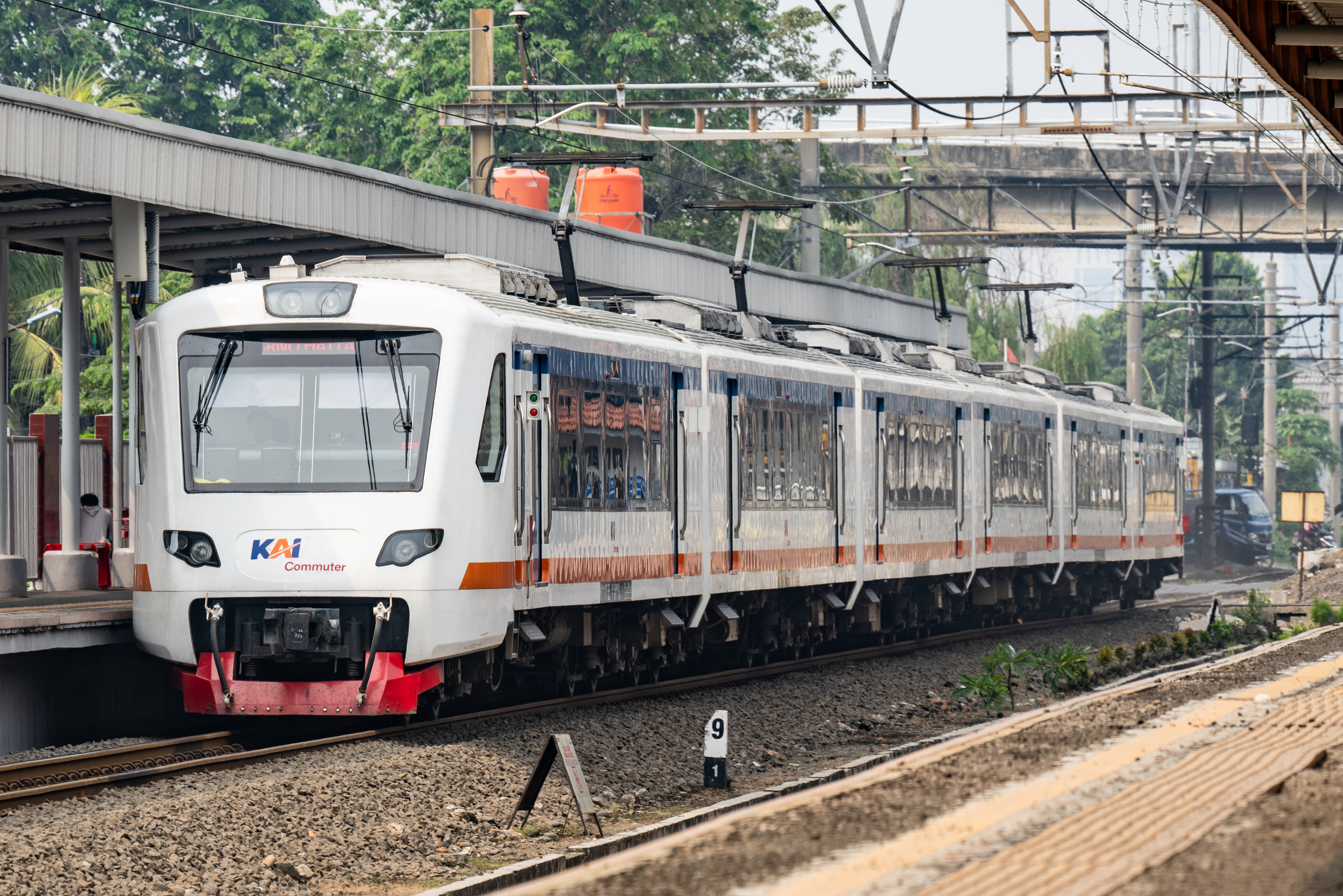
- INKA EA203 Series EMU at Duri station

Overview
- Native name: KRL Commuter Line Bandara Soekarno-Hatta
- Status: In service
- Owner: Kereta Api Indonesia
- Locale: Greater Jakarta, Indonesia
- Termini: SHIA; Manggarai
- Stations: 6
- Website: airport-train.kci.id

Service
- Type: Express rail & Airport rail link
- System: Airport rail link
- Services: Route 1: SHIA -Batu Ceper - Duri - BNI City - Manggarai
- Operator: KAI Commuter
- Rolling stock: EA203 series Ten 6-carriage trainsets
- Ridership: 11,287 (daily highest); 2.35 million (annual, 2025)

History
- Planned opening: Route 2: SHIA -Batu Ceper- Duri - Jakarta Kota
- Opened: 26 December 2017; 8 years ago

Technical
- Line length: 54.3 km (33.7 mi)
- Character: At-grade, Grade-separated
- Track gauge: 1,067 mm (3 ft 6 in)
- Electrification: 1,500 V DC overhead catenary
- Operating speed: 80 km/h (50 mph)

Soekarno–Hatta Airport Commuter Line (Indonesian: Commuter Line Bandara Soekarno–Hatta) or simply Soekarno–Hatta Line is an airport rail link service in Greater Jakarta, Indonesia. This airport rail link was built to cut travel time from the Jakarta city center to the airport, as roads connecting the Soekarno–Hatta International Airport (SHIA) and Jakarta city center are frequently affected by traffic congestion.

At present commuter service is operational between SHIA and Manggarai railway station, while express service is still at planning stage.

The Soekarno–Hatta ARS is the second airport rail link in Indonesia connecting passenger between city centre and airport after Kualanamu ARS.

Started in January 2023, KAI Commuter has officially become the operator of Soekarno-Hatta Airport Rail Link and change its name to Soekarno-Hatta Commuter Line as of GAPEKA 2023.

== History ==
The history of SHIA Commuter Line traces back to 2006, when Soemino Eko Saputro, the first Director-General of Railways, Ministry of Transportation and former CEO of Perumka, developed the system. He proposed a new railway system to support mobility of passengers of Soekarno–Hatta International Airport. According to a Directorate-General's plan, SHIA line begins at Manggarai towards SHIA and would be built in 2007–2008, and operated in 2009. The project costs 490 billion rupiahs, including upgrades for Duri–Kalideres and Kalideres–Soekarno-Hatta sections, signalling and telecommunication upgrades, and redesign of most stations. The plan also includes establishment of PT Railink (KAI Bandara) on 28 September 2006 as a joint venture between KAI and Angkasa Pura II.

The project plan was officially solidified only in 2011 with the issuing of a presidential regulation, Keppres No. 83 Year 2011, which assigned PT Angkasa Pura II and PT Kereta Api Indonesia to carry out the project. The project suffered major setbacks due to disputed land requisition issues surrounding construction of the new rail track as well as frequent plan changes. The railway was opened between SHIA and BNI City on 26 December 2017 and officially inaugurated on 2 January 2018. Services were extended to Manggarai on 5 September 2019.

The project was initially planned to only connect Manggarai station at South Jakarta and SHIA station at Tangerang. An expansion to connect to Jakarta Kota station at West Jakarta was announced in 2017, but was not operational as of March 2019. Plans called for service between Jakarta Kota services via Kampung Bandan and Duri on existing track.

== Route ==
There were 24 kilometers (15 mi) of existing train line from Manggarai to Batu Ceper and 12 kilometers (7.5 mi) of new track were built from Batu Ceper to SHIA station. At Duri, the trains reverse direction. The section between Manggarai and Duri are shared with Cikarang Loop Line commuter rail, but only stops at the two stations and BNI City. Similarly, the section from Duri to Batu Ceper is shared with Tangerang Line, but only stops at Batu Ceper.

Passengers can board the train from Manggarai, BNI City, Duri, Batu Ceper and SHIA stations. Two new railway stations, SHIA and BNI City, were newly constructed, while others were renovated to serve airport passengers. BNI City also serves for Cikarang Loop Line of the commuter rail.

Starting 19 June 2018, a limited number of trains were extended to Bekasi Station, serving Bekasi in West Java, a satellite town within Greater Jakarta,. Services to Bekasi were discontinued in September 2019.

KAI Commuter announces that starting in 1 March 2024, the Rawa Buaya station will start serving the airport train.

== Stations ==
The boarding stations for Soekarno–Hatta ARS are:

Station		Transfer/Notes		Location	
Code	Name	Transfer/Notes		City	Province
A01 B09 C13	Manggarai	KAI Commuter Bogor Line KAI Commuter Cikarang Loop Line	Terminal station Interchange to or Manggarai Manggarai Bus Terminal (via short walk) Manggarai Manggarai (U/C)	South Jakarta	Jakarta
A02 C11	BNI City	KAI Commuter Cikarang Loop Line	Interchange to Dukuh Atas BNI Dukuh Atas BNI Dukuh Atas Galunggung	Central Jakarta	Jakarta
A03 C09 T01	Duri	KAI Commuter Cikarang Loop Line KA Commuter Line Duri–Tangerang	Interchange to or	West Jakarta	Jakarta
A04 T06	Rawa Buaya	KA Commuter Line Duri–Tangerang	Interchange to	West Jakarta	Jakarta
A05 T09	Batu Ceper	KA Commuter Line Duri–Tangerang	Interchange to K1 K2 Terminal Poris Plawad Poris Plawad Bus Terminal	Tangerang	Banten
A06	SHIA		Terminal station Soekarno-Hatta International Airport Integrated Terminal 1, Terminal 2, and Terminal 3	Tangerang	Banten

When Manggarai station was still under renovation, BNI City station was used as the temporary terminus for the city center. At Manggarai station, there is separate entrance gate for airport train, and the train operates from platforms 8 and 9.

== Operations and schedule ==
The airport rail link services connect Jakarta city center (at Manggarai and Sudirman Baru) with Soekarno–Hatta International Airport. The journey takes approximately 46 minutes from BNI City station (previously known as Sudirman Baru station) to SHIA station. Each train has the capacity to carry up to 272 passengers and has the capacity to serve about 5,000 passengers with 80 trips a day. However, as of January 2019 ridership has not met expectations, with the service operating at only approximately 30% of capacity. As of April 2021, there are two separate classes, Premium and Executive, with separate schedules and trainsets.

As of March 2019, the airport train operates every 30 minutes in both directions, with services between 4:51 AM and 9:51 PM from BNI City and 6:20 AM to 11:20 PM from SHIA. The trip takes approximately 48 minutes.

At its opening, ticket price for each journey is IDR70,000 (equivalent to approximately US$5). Although initially the price point for each journey was set at IDR 100,000, government analysis recommended for a lower price point due to concern that that price would have been too expensive for consumers. Gradually after it, Railink offers progressive price based on origin and destination stations, offering lower prices for trips not originating/destined to Soekarno-Hatta Airport. Maximum ticket price for the Premium class trains introduced in April 2021 is IDR35.000. Cash payment is not available. Passengers can only book train tickets using credit and debit cards, as well as electronic money via Railink app available for smartphones or vending machines at stations. Executive class passengers can also pay directly on ticket gates using prepaid cards.

== Skytrain ==
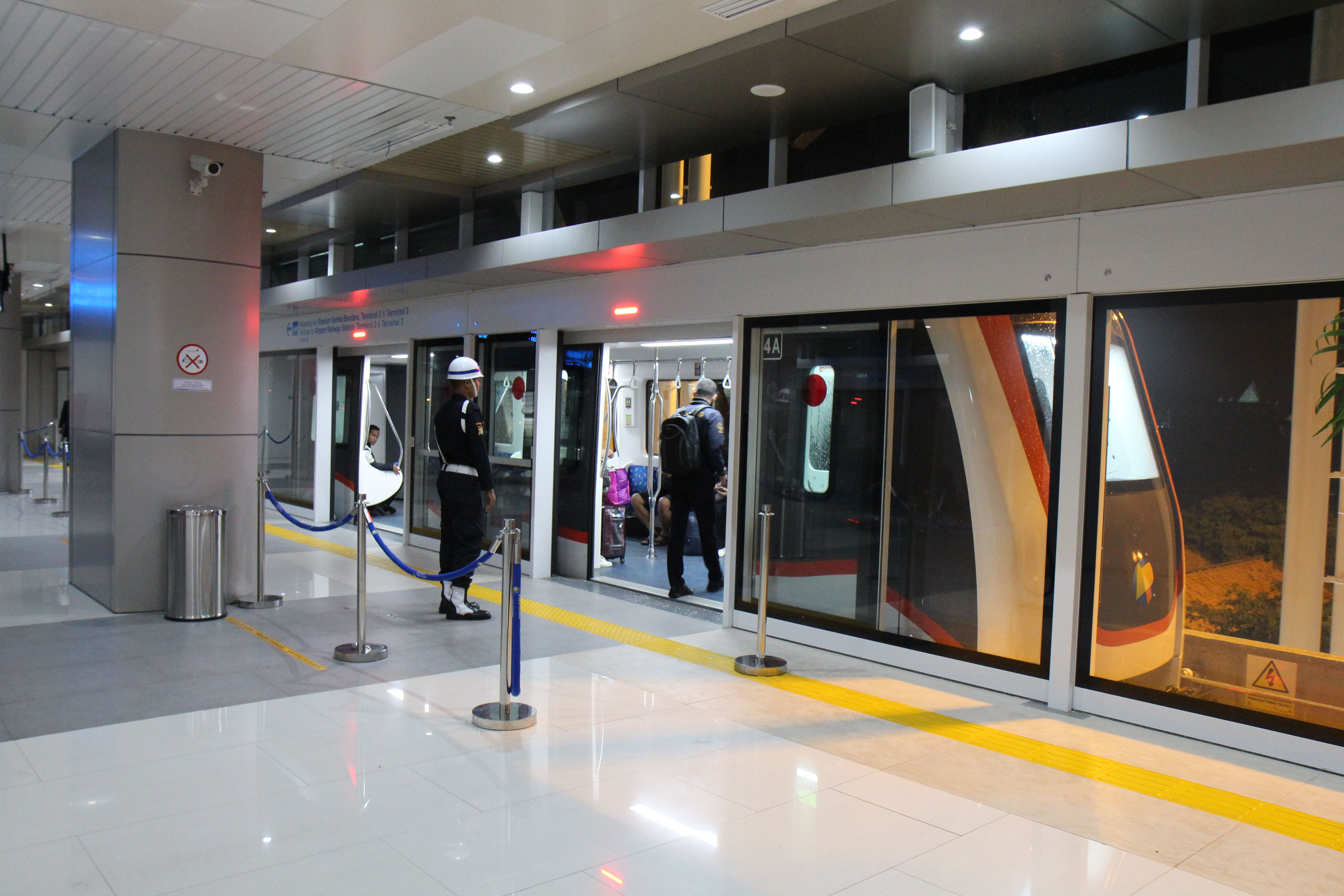
Automated People Mover Skytrain shuttle service connects SHIA Railink station with Soekarno-Hatta International Airport Terminals

The airport shuttle, Skytrain (Indonesian: Kereta Api Layang (Kalayang)) is the 3.05 kilometres Automated People Mover System (APMS) serves to connect Soekarno-Hatta Airport Terminals 1, 2, 3 and SHIA railway station free of charge. Skytrain takes 5 minutes from one terminal to another, with 7 minutes needed to get from Terminal 2 to Terminal 3.

The airport Skytrain shuttle is integrated to SHIA railway station, from where passengers can conveniently travel to–and from–Jakarta city center by train. Skytrain operating schedule is accessible online and through the Indonesia Airport website and smartphone application. Skytrain has been operational since 17 September 2017.

== Proposed SHIA–HPIA express airport rail link ==
An express train service is now under planning stage to connect Soekarno–Hatta International Airport with Halim Perdanakusuma Airport. Completion of this line is expected to be completed at the very earliest in 2019. At first this project was solely planned to be built as an 33-kilometer (21 mi) express line between Manggarai Station at South Jakarta and Soekarno–Hatta International Airport via Angke and Pluit, which would be a public–private partnership project. Later the route was extended from Manggarai to Halim Perdanakusuma Airport, which is in East Jakarta. The 33 kilometer project, proposed as Halim-Cawang-Manggarai-Tanah Abang-Sudirman-Pluit Terminal 2 and 3 SHIA stretch route, has been proposed to include a combination of surface-underground-elevated tracks. The express train is projected to take 30 minutes to connect the two main airports that serve the Greater Jakarta area.

== Accidents and incidents ==
- On 13 April 2023, an EA203 trainset suffered pantograph failure while stopping at Manggarai station, disrupting overhead power supply in vicinity of Manggarai station. Passengers from neighboring KRL Commuter Line trains using the same tracks were stranded.
- The day after the first incident, another EA203 trainset serving the line violently overran the end of tracks in Soekarno-Hatta Airport station while ending its trip from Manggarai. Several passengers were injured, and glass panels in front of the buffer stop were shattered.
- On 20 February 2026, an EA203 (Trainset 6) bound for Soekarno-Hatta Airport station derailed after a collision with a trapped lowboy trailer truck at Poris station, no one was injured but, all Commuter train bound for Tangerang only ended up at Rawa Buaya station as a result.

== See also ==
- Greater Jakarta Integrated Mass Transit System
- Soekarno–Hatta International Airport
- Kualanamu Airport Rail Link
- Minangkabau Express
- Yogyakarta International Airport Rail Link
- Adisumarmo Airport Rail Link
- Jakarta metropolitan area
