= Duri railway station =

Railway station in Indonesia

C09 T01 A03 Duri Station Stasiun Duri
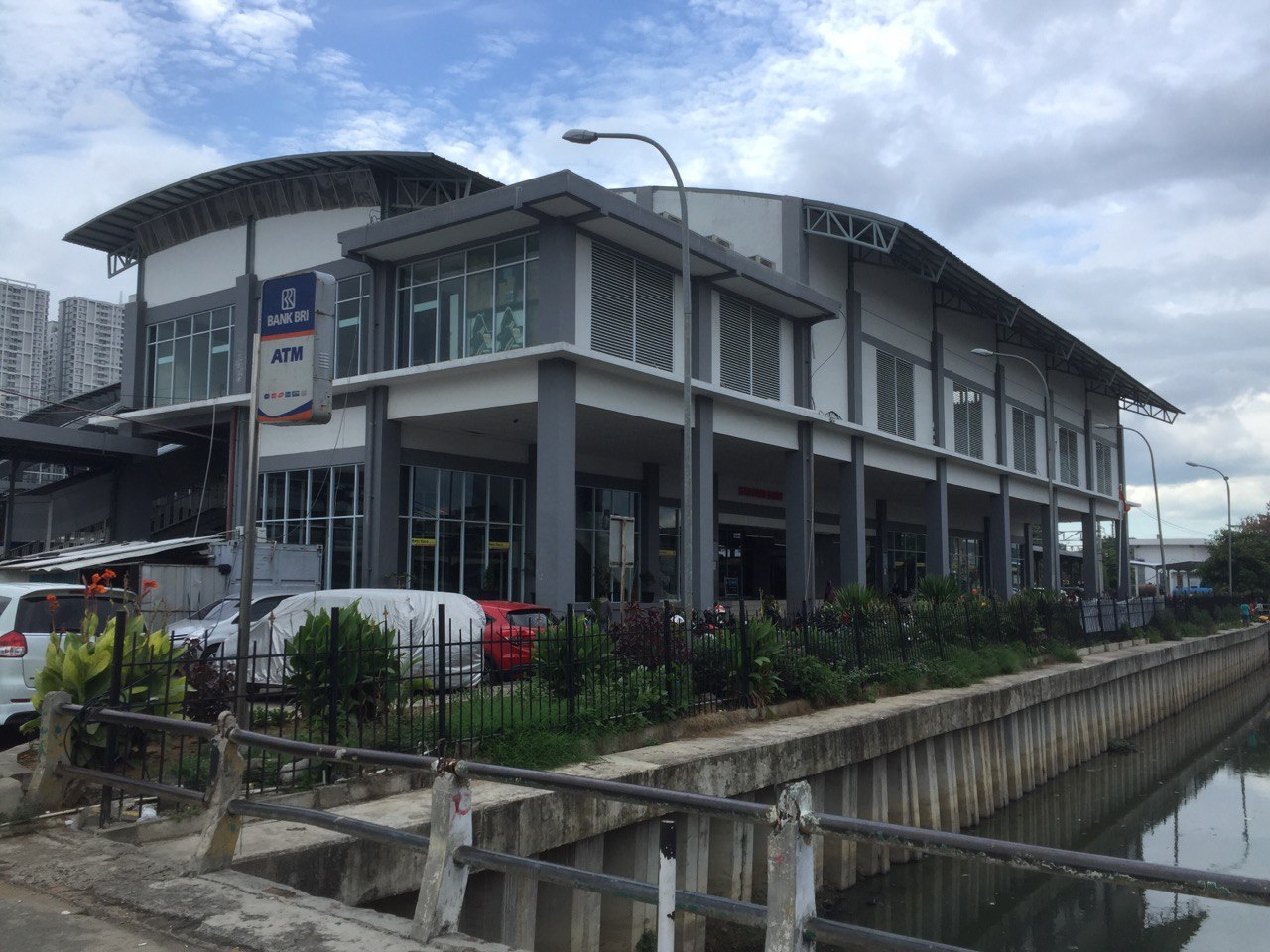
- Front facade of Duri station, 2020

General information
- Location: Jalan Kali Anyar X Kali Anyar, Tambora; West Jakarta 11310; Indonesia
- Coordinates: 6.1560°S 106.8014°E
- Elevation: 20 m (66 ft)
- System: Commuter line and airport rail link station
- Owner: Kereta Api Indonesia
- Operator: KAI Commuter
- Lines: Cikarang Loop Line; Tangerang Line; Soekarno-Hatta Line
- Platforms: 2 island platforms Single side platform
- Tracks: 5

Construction
- Parking: Available

Other information
- Station code: DU • 0404
- Classification: I

History
- Opened: 2 January 1899
- Former names: Doeri
- Original company: Staatsspoorwegen

Services
Preceding station		Following station
Terminus	Tangerang Commuter Line	Grogol towards Tangerang
Angke towards Angke or Kampung Bandan	Cikarang Commuter Line	Tanah Abang towards Bekasi or Cikarang via Manggarai
BNI City towards Manggarai	Soekarno–Hatta Airport Commuter Line	Rawa Buaya towards SHIA
Location
- Location within Jakarta

Duri Station (DU) (Indonesian: Stasiun Duri) is a railway station located in West Jakarta, Indonesia. It serves as the starting point and the eastern terminus of the Tangerang Line service, as well as the transfer point to the Cikarang Loop Line and the Soekarno–Hatta Airport Rail Link. The station is a major transfer point for commuters to or from Tangerang. When the Jakarta Kota-Manggarai railway is disrupted, trains between Jakarta Kota and Manggarai are rerouted via Duri.

== History ==
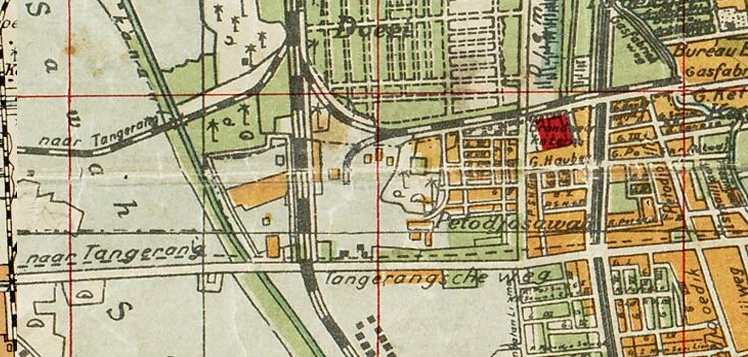
The rail fork map to the former gas factory of NIGM during the Dutch colonial era

Duri Station was originally a small train stop opened on 2 January 1899 by the State Railway Company, Staatssporwegen (SS). It was built in conjunction with the planned operation of the Jakarta-Angke-Rangkasbitung railway line. There is a branch to Tangerang along 23 km with a track width of 1067 mm. Then in the same year, on 1 October, the SS inaugurated the 76 km Duri-Rangkasbitung railway line. Then forwarded to Serang and Anyer in 1900. Previously, from the south of line 1 there was a 2.5 km branch to the PGN Gas Factory owned by the Nederlandsch Indische Gasmaatschappij (NIGM) to serve gas transportation. However, currently those branches are no longer operational. This factory was built in 1859 which is located on the north side of Gang Ketapang which is now Jalan K.H. Zainul Arifin. The location of this former gas factory is now used as the headquarters of PT Perusahaan Gas Negara Tbk. The former rails and intersections of this line are no longer visible because they are buried in asphalt.

The Duri Station building was overhauled in 2017–2018 and now has two floors with elevators and escalators considering this station is one of the Soekarno-Hatta Airport Rail Link stations. The previous Staatsspoorwegen-era building has been torn down for the new building's construction. Starting from 26 December 2017, the Soekarno–Hatta Airport Rail Link service make a stop here.

== Building and layout ==
This station has one side platform and two island platforms. Platform number 1 and 2 serves Cikarang Loop Line, platform 3 and 4 serves as a stop for Soekarno–Hatta Airport Rail Link, and platform number 5 serves as both starting point and terminus for Tangerang Line. These platforms are connected by a newly built overhead bridge.

On 8 September 2022, the access to the west gate of Duri Station which is connected to Jalan Kalianyar X has been operating for entry and exit of passengers.

C09 T01 A03
P Platform floor	Side platforms, doors are opened on the left side for train departures
P Platform floor	Line 5	← (Grogol) Tangerang Line to Tangerang
P Platform floor	Island platform
P Platform floor	Line 4	End line of the Tangerang Line→ ← (Rawa Buaya) to Soekarno–Hatta International Airport
P Platform floor	Island platform
P Platform floor	Line 3	← (BNI City) Airport Rail Link to Manggarai
P Platform floor	Line 2	← (Tanah Abang) Cikarang Loop Line (counterclockwise loop) to Cikarang
P Platform floor	Island platform, doors are opened on the left side
P Platform floor	Line 1	Cikarang Loop Line (clockwise loop) towards Kampung Bandan (Angke) →
P Platform floor	Side platforms, doors are opened on the right side
G	Main building of the station

== Services ==
The following is a list of train services at the Duri Station.

=== Passenger services ===
==== KAI Commuter ====
- Cikarang Loop Line (Full Racket)
  - to Cikarang (counter-clockwise via Tanah Abang and Manggarai)
  - to Cikarang (clockwise via Kampung Bandan)
- Cikarang Loop Line (Half Racket), to Angke/Kampung Bandan and Cikarang (via Tanah Abang)
- Tangerang Line, to Tangerang

==== KAI Bandara ====
- Soekarno–Hatta Airport Rail Link, to Manggarai and SHIA

== Supporting transportation ==
Public transport type	Route	Destination
Mikrolet	M41	Grogol Bus Terminal–Tambora
TRON		Duri–Baharia Park PIK II

== Incidents ==
- On 28 April 2013, an elderly woman was killed when she was hit by the Bogor-Jatinegara KRL. The victim died on the spot.
- On 13 April 2016, a middle-aged man died when he was hit by the Duri-Tangerang KRL. The victim died on the spot and sat in the middle of the tracks.
- On 11 August 2020, dozens of houses in the densely populated Pasar Duri area burned to the ground due to an electric short circuit. As a result, night trips of the Commuter Line Trains at Duri Station were temporarily suspended.

== Gallery ==
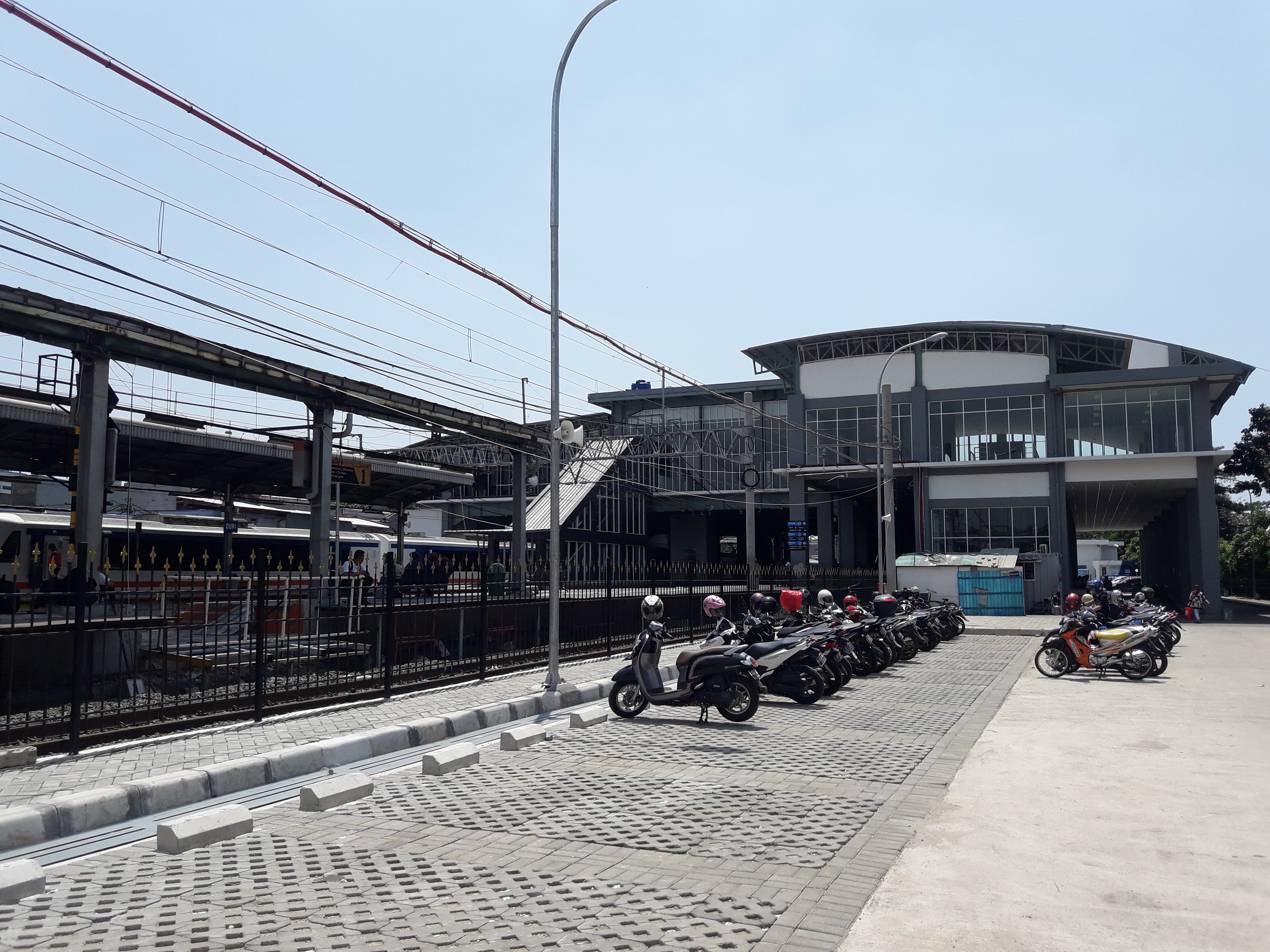
The exterior of the station in 2018

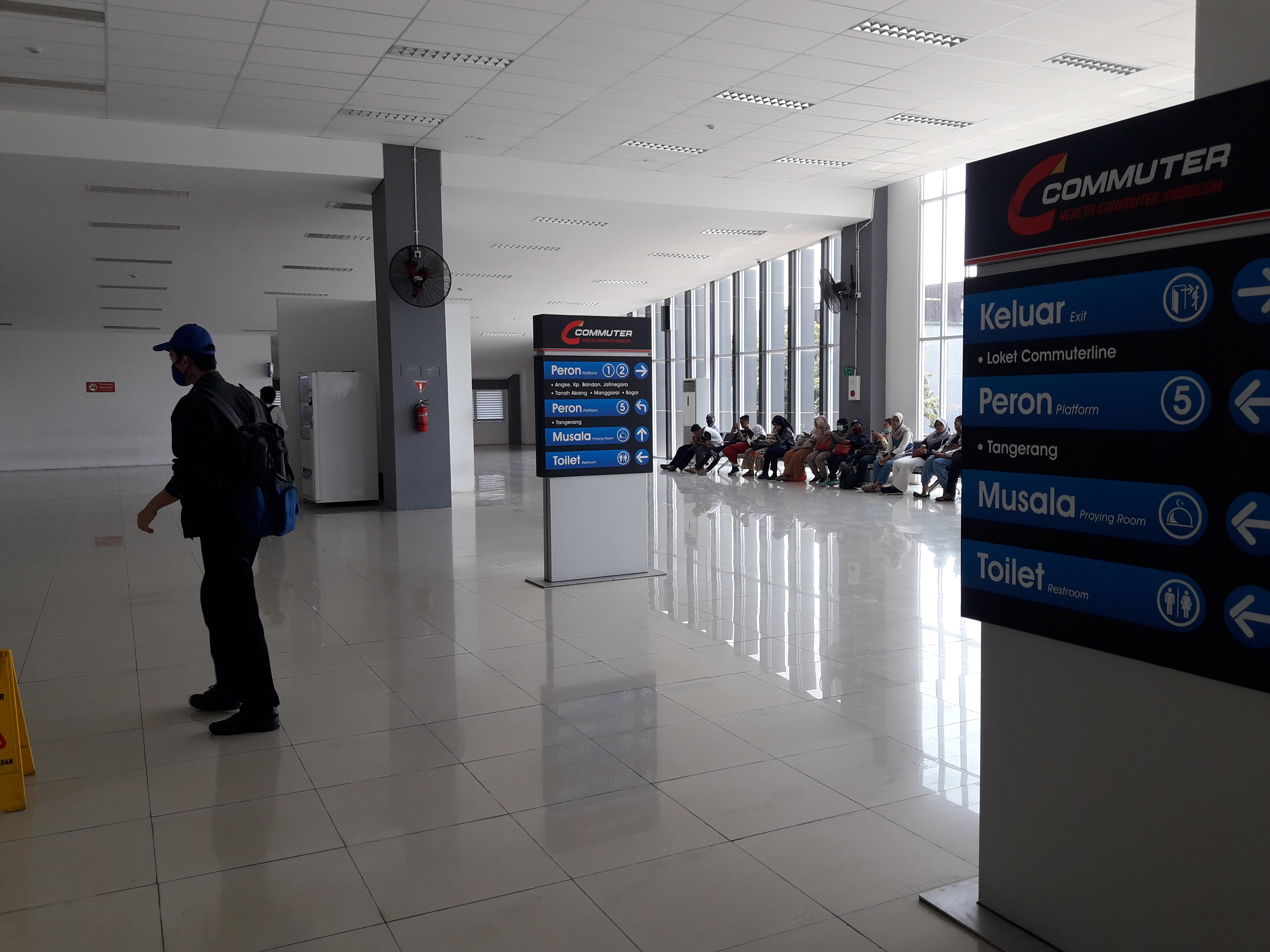
The concourse of the station
