= Tangerang railway station =

Railway station in Indonesia

T11 Tangerang Station Stasiun Tangerang
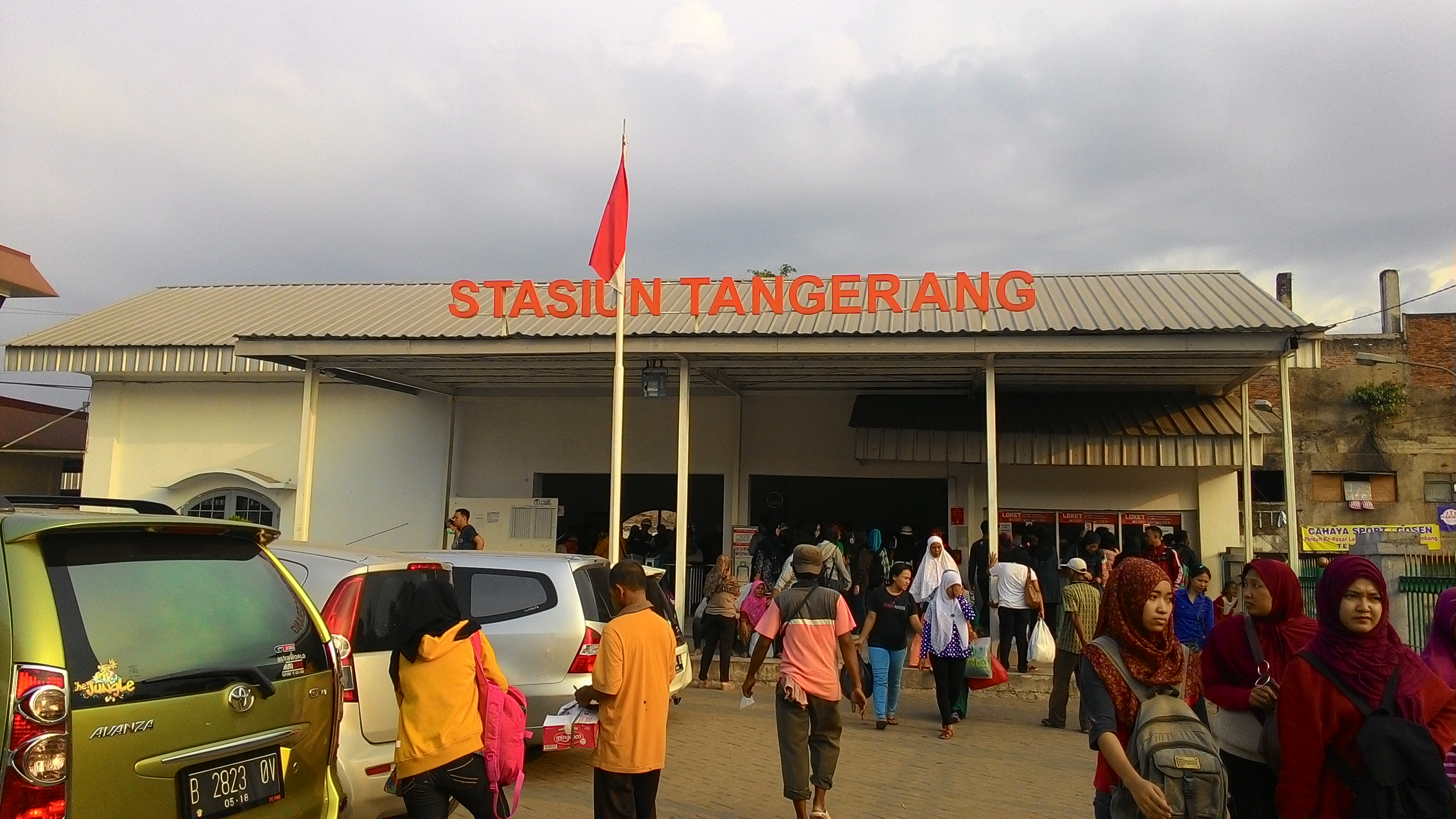
- The entrance of the station (2015)

General information
- Location: Jalan Ki Asnawi, Tangerang; Banten; Indonesia
- Coordinates: 6.1769°S 106.6330°E
- Elevation: +18 m (59 ft)
- Owner: Kereta Api Indonesia
- Operator: KAI Commuter
- Lines: Duri–Tangerang railway; Tangerang Line
- Platforms: 3 bay platforms
- Tracks: 4

Construction
- Structure type: Ground

Other information
- Station code: TNG
- Classification: Large class type C

History
- Opened: 2 January 1899
- Rebuilt: 2013

Passengers
- 2018: 6.6 million

Services
Preceding station		Following station
Tanah Tinggi towards Duri	Tangerang Commuter Line	Terminus
Location
- Location within Jakarta Metropolitan Area

Tangerang Station (Indonesian: Stasiun Tangerang) is a railway station located in the city of Tangerang, Banten. It is the western terminus of the Duri–Tangerang railway. This station only serves commuter trains operated by Kereta Commuter Indonesia. Passengers are mainly commuters going from the suburbs in Tangerang to Jakarta.

== History ==
Staatsspoorwegen built a branch line from Duri Station to Tangerang Station via Staatblad No. 180 dated 5 July 1896 to transport agricultural products, military needs, and passengers. The station along with the 19 km line was inaugurated on 2 January 1899.

In 1935, it was recorded that every day there were 12 train operations at this station, and vice versa with the same number of trips. The Duri-Tangerang train is available in two circuits, namely a special class 3 circuit and a mixed class between classes 2 and 3. Class 2 is intended for foreigners, Chinese and indigenous businessmen while class 3 is for indigenous people.

Most of the goods transported are agricultural products. The private lands previously managed by Chinese businessmen were planted with rice, peanuts, cassava, indigo, coconut and various types of vegetables. In addition to agricultural products, goods transported by train are household handicrafts. The most widely done craft is weaving hats from bamboo. The results of the hats were bought by the Chinese and Europeans. Most of the Chinese resold the bamboo hats they bought, while the Europeans sent them overseas via the Port of Tanjung Priok.

== Building and layout ==
This station has 4 train lines, with lines 1 and 2 being a straight line towards Tanah Tinggi. Right next to line 4 there is a KRL subdepot to store facilities.

In the past, Tangerang Station had a branch towards the Cisadane River, the branch line is believed to have been before the Pasar Anyar crossing but now there is no trace of it. This branch was used for the transportation of materials from the Cisadane River for the construction of Gelora Bung Karno Sports Complex in 1960–1962. It is said that the C300 locomotive took part in the process of delivering materials for the construction of GBK. This rail is adjacent to the Tangerang City Sports Hall, along Jalan Kampung Sukamulya, Babakan Ujung.

G	Main building
Platform floor	Side platform
Platform floor	Line 1	Tangerang Line from and towards Duri (Tanah Tinggi) →
Platform floor	Line 2	Tangerang Line from and towards Duri (Tanah Tinggi) →
Platform floor	Island platform
Platform floor	Line 3	Tangerang Line from and towards Duri (Tanah Tinggi) →
Platform floor	Line 4	Tangerang Line from and towards Duri (Tanah Tinggi) →
Platform floor	Island platform
Platform floor	Line 5	Train parking area
Platform floor	Line 6	Train parking area

== Services ==
The following is a list of train services at the Poris Station.

=== Passenger services ===
- KAI Commuter
  - Tangerang Line, to Duri

== Supporting transportation ==
Type	Route	Destination
Angkot (share taxi)	R01	Poris Plawad-Jatake
Angkot (share taxi)	R02	Poris Plawad-Cibodasari
Angkot (share taxi)	R03	Poris Plawad-Plaza Kotabumi
Angkot (share taxi)	R03A	Poris Plawad-Serpong Station
Angkot (share taxi)	R04	Poris Plawad-Selapajang Jaya
Angkot (share taxi)	R05	Poris Plawad-Kebon Besar
Angkot (share taxi)	T08	Poris Plawad-Sangiang Jaya
Angkot (share taxi)	R10	Poris Plawad-Danau Cipondoh
Angkot (share taxi)	T07 (Loop line)	Poris Plawad-Tangerang Station
Angkot (share taxi)	R11	Poris Plawad-Bencongan (via Jalan Beringin Raya–Jalan Cemara Raya)
Angkot (share taxi)	R14	Poris Plawad-Bencongan (via Jalan Teuku Umar–Jalan Gatot Subroto)
Angkot (share taxi)	R06A	Bojong Nangka-Poris Plawad
Angkot (share taxi)	B09	Dadap-Poris Plawad
Angkot (share taxi)	K17	Kampung Melayu Timur–Poris Plawad

== Controversy ==
- On July 19, 2016, there was a closure of access to enter Tangerang Station by the Tangerang City Government. Passengers were then diverted through the east station entrance. As a result, Tangerang residents have difficulty on accessing the station because they have to walk far from the station entrance towards Jalan Kisamaun. This is because the entrance to the station was closed because it unraveled the chaos of angkots waiting for passengers at Tangerang Station.

Preceding station	Kereta Api Indonesia	Following station
Tanah Tinggi towards Duri	Duri–Tangerang	Terminus
