= Jatinegara–Manggarai railway =

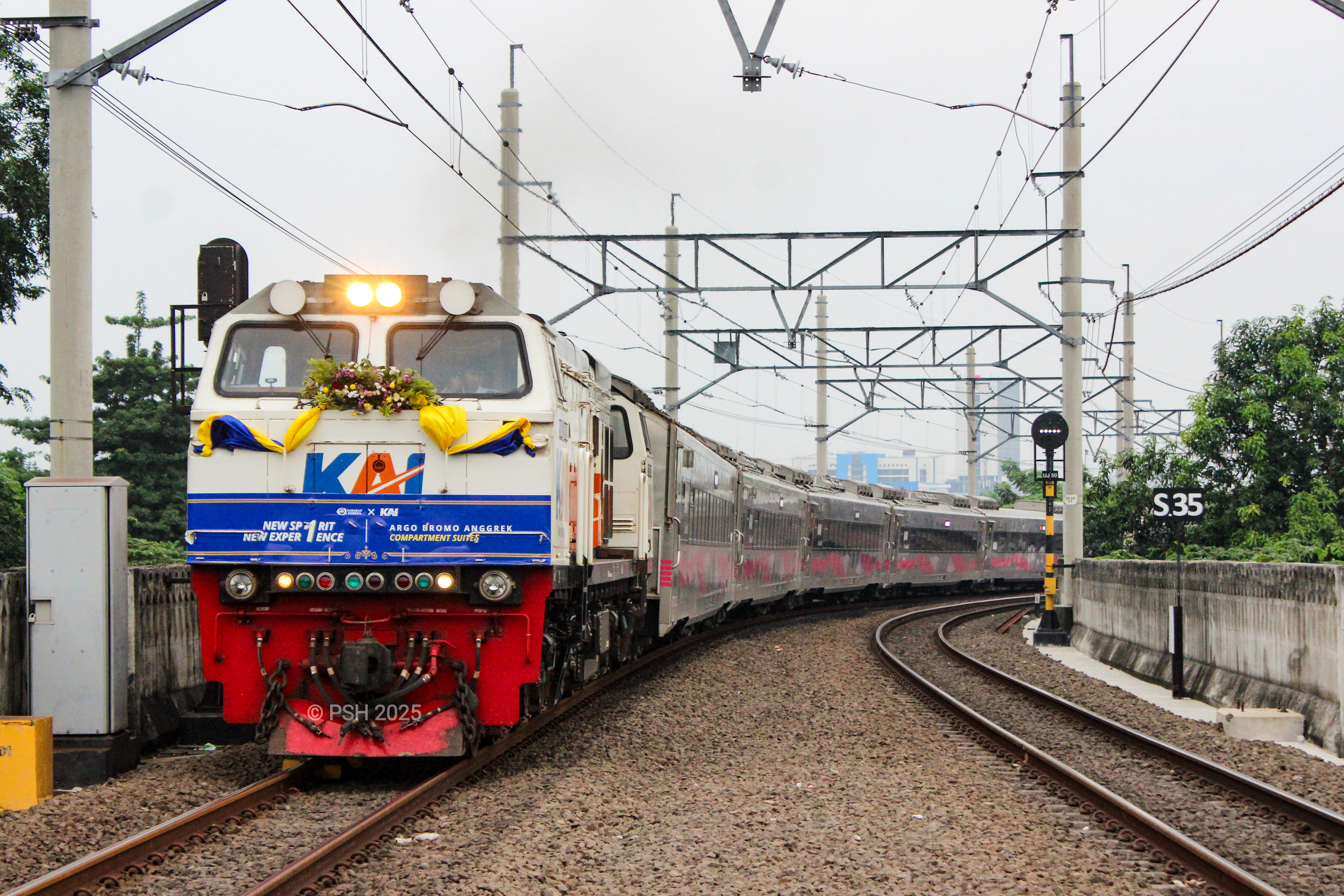
- Argo Bromo Anggrek passing in Matraman

Overview
- Native name: Jalur kereta api Jatinegara–Manggarai
- Status: Operational
- Locale: Indonesia
- Termini: Jatinegara; Manggarai

Service
- Operator(s): PT Kereta Api

Technical
- Number of tracks: Double track
- Track gauge: 3 ft 6 in (1,067 mm)
- Electrification: 1,500 V DC overhead catenary

The Jatinegara–Manggarai railway (Indonesian: Jalur kareta api Jatinegara–Manggarai) is a railway line in Indonesia.
