= Karet railway station =

Inactive railway station in Indonesia

C11a Karet Station Stasiun Karet
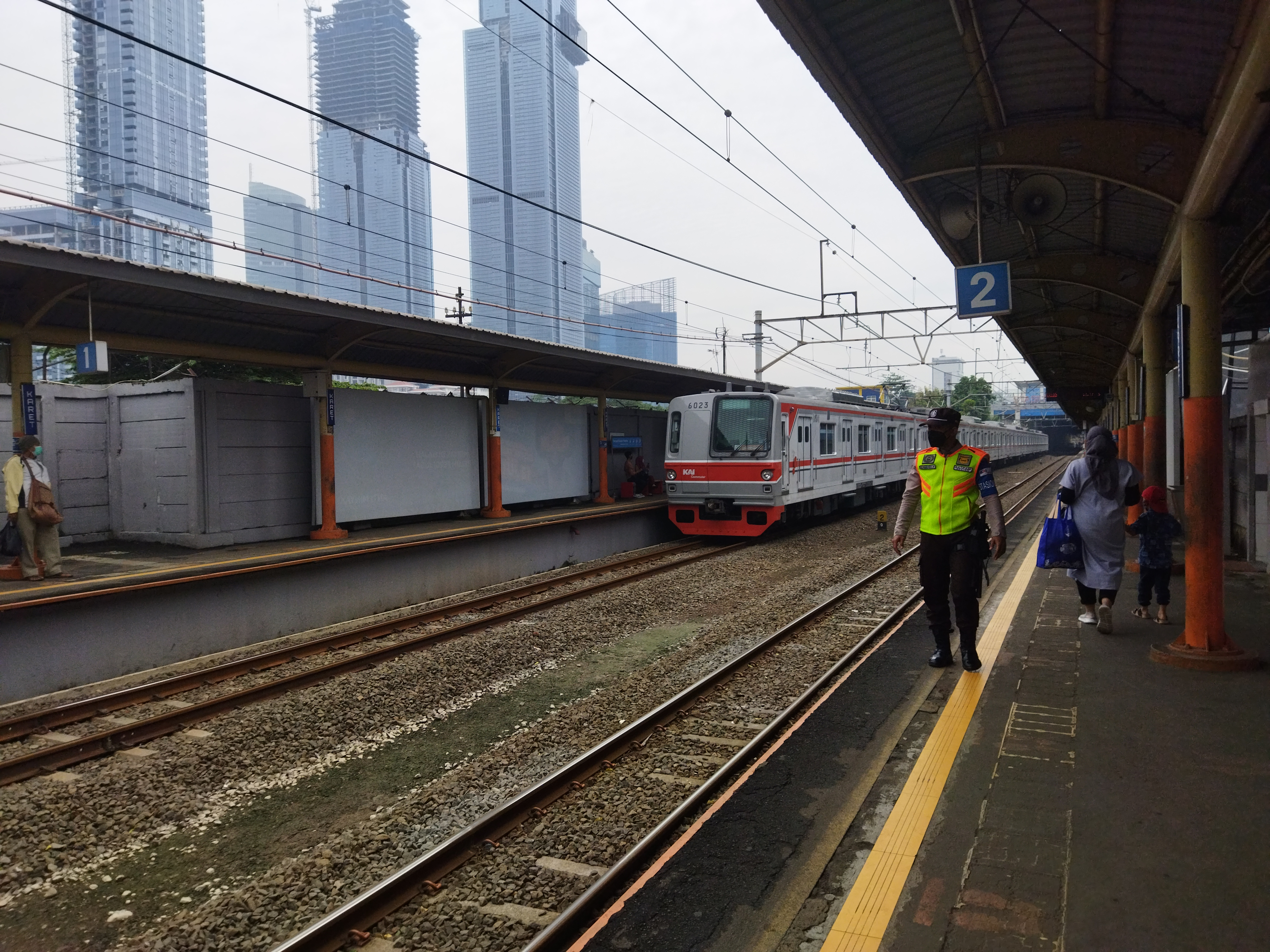
- Karet station platform, 2021

General information
- Location: Jl. KH Mas Mansyur, Kebon Melati, Tanah Abang, Central Jakarta 10230; Indonesia
- Coordinates: 6°12′03″S 106°48′57″E
- Elevation: +11 m (36 ft)
- Owner: Kereta Api Indonesia
- Operator: KAI Commuter
- Line: Cikarang Loop Line
- Platforms: 2 side platforms
- Tracks: 2

Construction
- Structure type: Ground
- Accessible: Available

Other information
- Station code: KAT

History
- Opened: 1 August 1922
- Closed: 1 September 2026
Location
- Location within Jakarta

Karet Station (KAT) was a railway station located in Kebon Melati, Tanah Abang, Central Jakarta, Indonesia. It lies on the north bank of West Flood Canal. Before its closure this station only served Commuterline trains. This station and Sudirman station are spaced only 0.8 km from each other, making it one of the shortest stretches between any two stations in the network. It only takes one minute to travel between these two stations. BNI City railway station, a station that serves Soekarno–Hatta Airport Rail Link along with the Cikarang loop line, is wedged between these two station. The station was closed on 1 September 2026 to give way for eventual merger with BNI City Station.

== History ==
=== Early operational ===
Karet Station was opened alongside the Tanah Abang–Manggarai (circle line) railway on 1 August 1922 to replace the previous line that passed through Salemba and present-day elite neighborhood of Menteng. Karet and other stations along the loop line were renovated and electrified in 1987 to accommodate an electric-propelled commuter train service along the loop line.

=== Closure and merger into BNI City Station ===
Rumors on the closure of Karet Station emerged in 2022, as the Cikarang Loop Line started to stop at the neighboring BNI City Station to the east, but was denied by KAI Commuter. This is due to the fact that both stations are wedging too close. As the VP Corporate Secretary of KAI Commuter, Anne Purba said that the Karet Station is not closed and would still serve KRL users. Related to this, KAI Commuter operates the station to divide traffic density at Sudirman Station by up to 40%.

On 2 January 2025, Minister of State-Owned Enterprise Erick Thohir stated that "Karet (station) would be closed" for failing to meet new standards, especially because of its narrow platforms. KAI also added that the closure could help speed up the travel times of both Cikarang Loop Line and Soekarno–Hatta Airport Rail Link trains. In response to the closure, the Provincial Government of Jakarta constructed a promenade along the Ciliwung River enbankment as a direct access of BNI City Station from and towards K.H. Mas Mansyur street to the west of Karet Station. On 30 January 2025, KAI Commuter stated that Karet Station would be merged into BNI City, with the process started sometime around April that year. It was reported that the station would not be closed, instead it would be merged with BNI City station.

On 1 September 2026, Karet Station was officially closed and passengers are redirected to BNI City. The former station would be modified into a new entrance of BNI City station.

== Station layout ==
C11a
P Platform floor	Inactive side platform, not serving passengers
P Platform floor	Line 1	← (Tanah Abang) Straight track to Kampung Bandan
P Platform floor	Line 2	Straight track to Manggarai (BNI City) →
P Platform floor	Inactive side platform, not serving passengers
G	Main building

== Services ==
The following is a list of train services at Karet Station until 31 August 2026.

=== Passenger services ===
- KAI Commuter
  - Cikarang Loop Line (Full Racket)
    - to Cikarang (counter-clockwise via Manggarai)
    - to Cikarang (clockwise via Tanah Abang and Duri)
  - Cikarang Loop Line (Half Racket), to Angke/Kampung Bandan (via Tanah Abang and Duri) and Cikarang

== Intermodal support ==
Public transport type	Line	Destination
Transjakarta	8C (MetroTrans)	Tanah Abang–Pasar Kebayoran Lama
Mikrotrans Jak Lingko	JAK 8	ITC Roxy Mas–Pasar Bendungan Hilir
Mikrotrans Jak Lingko	JAK 9	ITC Roxy Mas–Karet Tengsin

== Places of interest ==
- Karet Bivak Cemetery
- The London School of Public Relations
- LaSalle College Jakarta
- Wisma 46 BNI
- Shangri-La Hotel Jakarta
- Popular Theater Teguh Karya Building

Preceding station	Kereta Api Indonesia	Following station
Tanah Abang; Terminus	Jakarta Railway; THB–MRI	BNI City towards Manggarai
