= BNI City railway station =

Railway station in Indonesia

C11 A02 BNI City station Stasiun BNI City
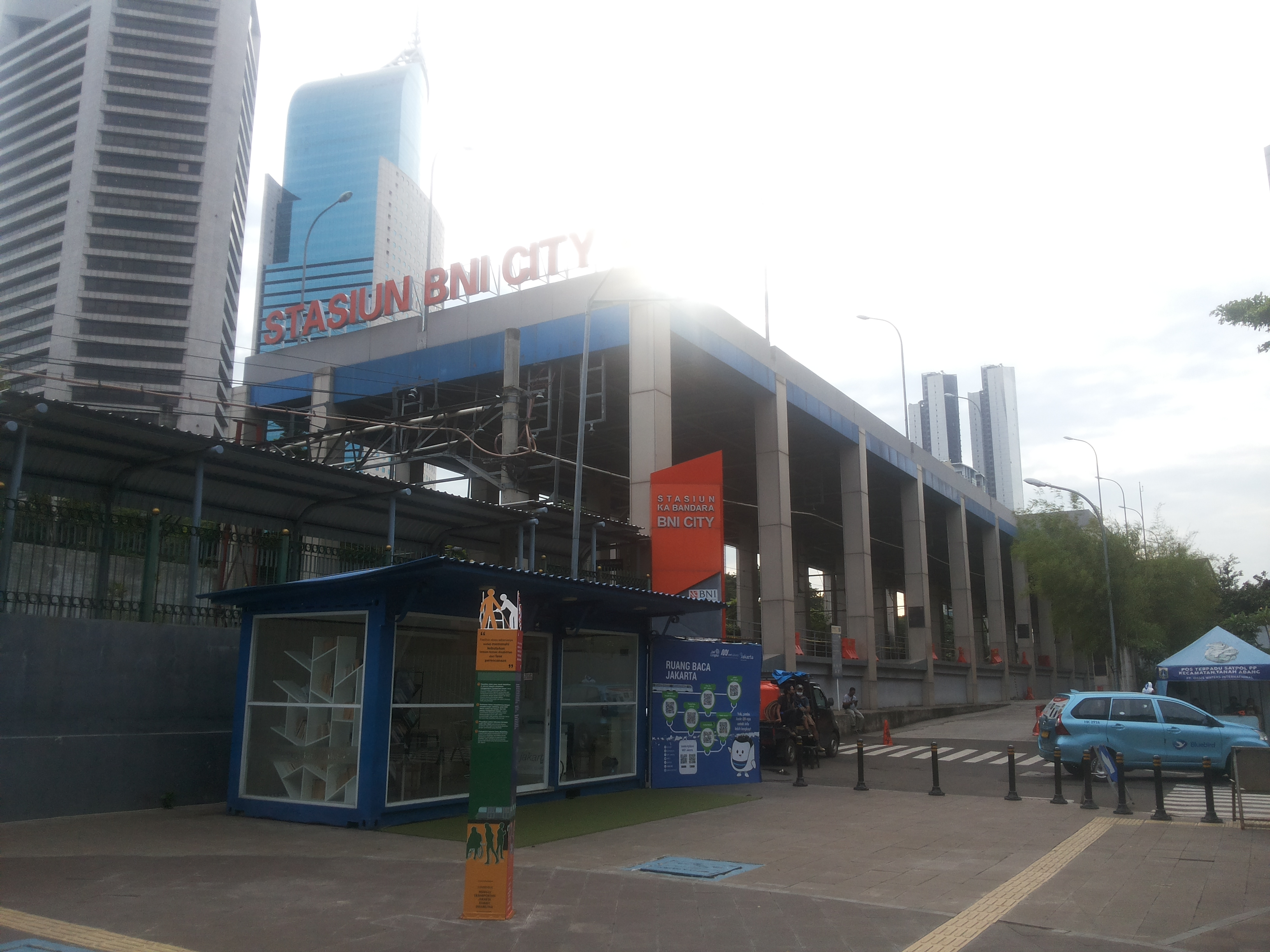
- BNI City station building in the evening, 2024

General information
- Location: Central Jakarta, Jakarta; Indonesia
- Coordinates: 6.201917°S 106.820913°E
- Owner: Kereta Api Indonesia
- Operator: KAI Commuter
- Lines: Cikarang Loop Line; Soekarno-Hatta Line
- Platforms: 2 side platforms
- Tracks: 2
- Connections: Sudirman; Dukuh Atas BNI; Dukuh Atas Bank Syariah Indonesia; Dukuh Atas; Galunggung

Construction
- Structure type: Ground
- Parking: Available
- Accessible: Available

Other information
- Station code: SUDB • BNC • KAT
- Classification: II

History
- Opened: 26 December 2017

Services
Preceding station		Following station
Manggarai Terminus	Soekarno–Hatta Airport Commuter Line	Duri towards SHIA
Tanah Abang towards Angke or Kampung Bandan	Cikarang Commuter Line	Sudirman towards Bekasi or Cikarang via Manggarai
Location
- Location within Jakarta

BNI City Station (BNC, Indonesian: Stasiun BNI City) is a station for the Soekarno-Hatta Airport Rail Link and KAI Commuter service. Bank Negara Indonesia (BNI) holds the naming rights for the station, which was known as Sudirman Baru station (SUDB, English: New Sudirman station) during construction period. The station is located in Central Jakarta, on the north bank of West Flood Canal, about a hundred meters from Sudirman Commuter Rail station. The station is part of Dukuh Atas TOD.

== History ==
Initially, this station was named Sudirman Baru because it is located on the west side of Jalan Jenderal Sudirman. This means that the name of this station must be distinguished from the Old Sudirman Station, which only serves Commuter Line routes. Bank Negara Indonesia (BNI), Kereta Api Indonesia (KAI), and Railink have agreed to name this station as BNI City as a strategy to create synergies between state-owned enterprises. BNI participates in managing this station with PT Railink and PT KAI; by providing supporting facilities such as ATMs and ticket machines.

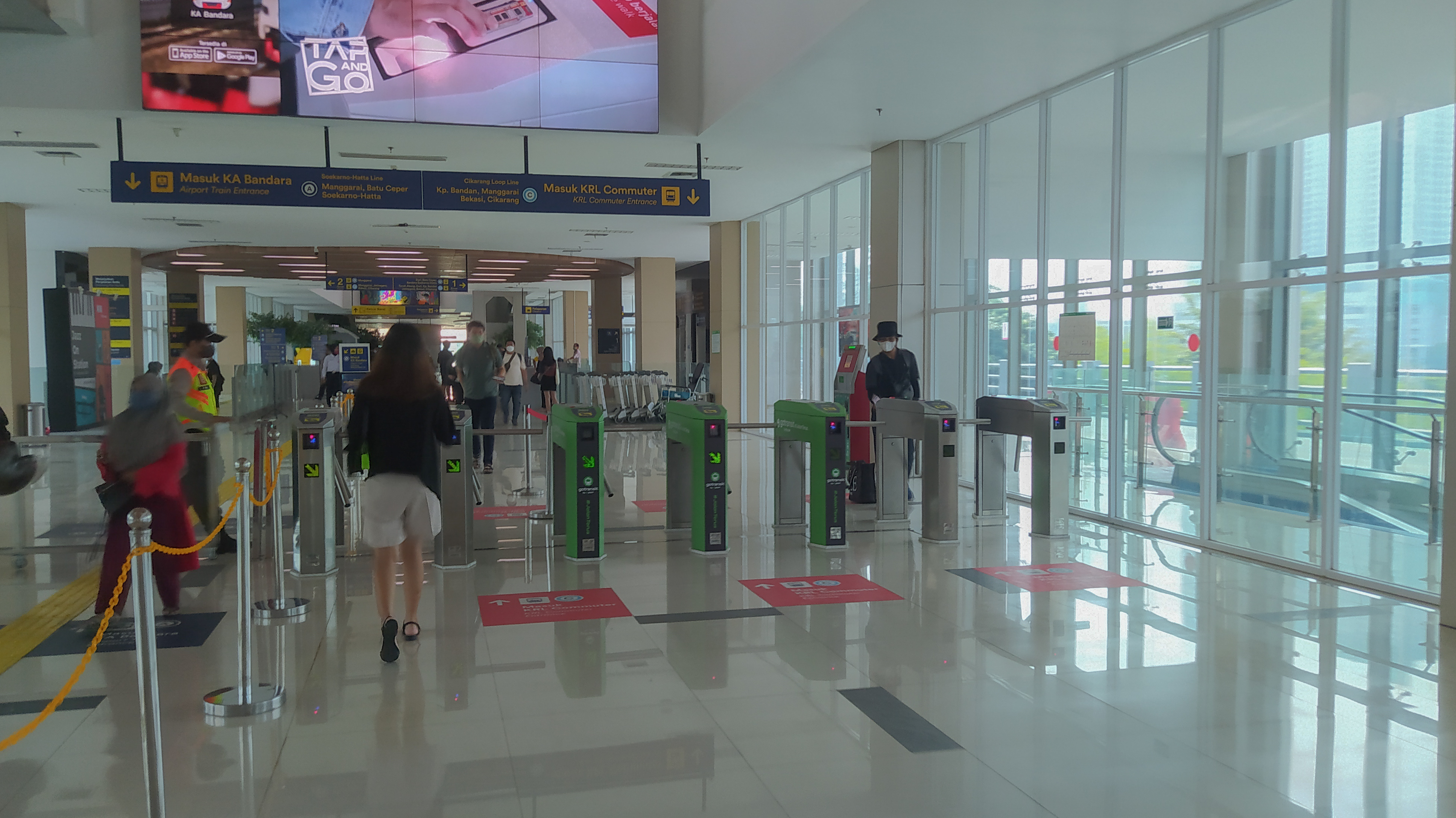
Entrance and exit gate of the station for Cikarang Loop Line passengers.

Sudirman Baru Station began serving passengers on 26 December 2017 and was inaugurated on 2 January 2018. With the presence of this station, it will facilitate the mobility of airport passengers, both from Soekarno–Hatta International Airport and from Jakarta and Tangerang.

As of 30 July 2022, BNI City start serving KAI Commuter Cikarang Loop Line's passengers. This operation is aim to share the density of passengers at Sudirman Station by 40%. This operations are carried out by separating the gate and the flow of incoming/outgoing passengers between Commuter Line and airport rail link, but the platform has not been separated between the two services. Anne Purba as the VP Corporate Secretary of KAI Commuter denied reports that the Karet Station would be closed due to the operation of the KRL in Sudirman Baru.

On 1 January 2025, Minister of State-Owned Enterprises Erick Thohir announced the closure of Karet Station due to the absence of this station on the 2025 Grafik Perjalanan Kereta Api (GAPEKA). The closure was accommodated by adding a footpath on the banks of the Ciliwung River (riverwalk) and a corridor connected to BNI City Station. The merger of this station with BNI City Station is expected to improve the railway ecosystem and optimize services to passengers.

Along with the merger of Karet Station and BNI City Station, PT KAI announced the transfer of Airport Train services from BNI City Station to Sudirman Station in April 2025, so that passengers from the LRT station who want to go to Soekarno-Hatta Airport no longer need to go to BNI City so that the performance of Airport Train occupancy can increase. The transfer will initially be carried out by opening services at both stations, Sudirman Station and BNI City Station.

On 1 September 2026, Karet Station was officially closed for merger renovation and all services were transferred to BNI City Station. Before that, a new entrance and western end of the latter's building were added to provide access to the K.H. Mas Mansyur street west of Karet Station via a promenade along the canal enbankment. The merger is planned to be completed on 31 December 2026.

== Naming rights ==
The station is named as BNI City (Indonesian: Stasiun BNI City), after its naming rights was purchased by Bank Negara Indonesia. It is the first railway station in Indonesia which granted its naming rights to a corporation.

== Station layout ==
This station have two train tracks. Both tracks are straight tracks.

BNI City station has three floors and is about 500 metres (1,600 feet) in length. On the ground floor, a number of station support facilities such as escalators, tap-in and tap-out machines, ticket vending machines, two seating areas for passengers, and lifts are located. There are also food outlets, minimarkets, toilets, mosques, clinics, and self-service flight check-in machines.

The upstairs of the station will also be used for platform, which is 240 metres (790 feet) long and 32 metres (105 feet) wide. There are four escalators in the station. The station has a parking lot.

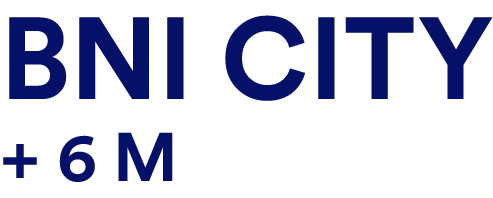
A02 C11
G	Main building
P Platform floor	Side platform, the doors are opened on the right side
P Platform floor	Line 1	← (Duri) Airport Rail Link to SHIA ← (Tanah Abang) Cikarang Loop Line (clockwise loop) towards Kampung Bandan
P Platform floor	Line 2	Airport Rail Link to Manggarai (Manggarai) → Cikarang Loop Line (counterclockwise loop) to Cikarang (Sudirman) →
P Platform floor	Side platform, the doors are opened on the right side
G	Main building

== Services ==
=== KRL Commuterline ===
Train name	Last destination	Notes
Cikarang Loop Line (half racket)	Angke	
Cikarang Loop Line (half racket)	Kampung Bandan	
Cikarang Loop Line (half racket)	Cikarang	
Cikarang Loop Line (Cikarang–Jatinegara–Pasar Senen–Kampung Bandan–Manggarai–Jatinegara–Cikarang)	Cikarang	Couter-clockwise trip
Cikarang Loop Line (Cikarang–Jatinegara–Manggarai–Kampung Bandan–Kemayoran–Jatinegara–Cikarang)	Cikarang	Clockwise trip

=== Airport Rail Link ===
Train name	Last destination	Notes
Airport Rail Link	Manggarai	
Airport Rail Link	SHIA	

== Supporting transportation ==
As the station is part of Dukuh Atas TOD, it is integrated with several mode of public transportation available in Jakarta. The station is located on the north bank of the West Flood Canal, about hundred meters away from Sudirman station of Jakarta Commuter service. Before 28 May 2022, Sudirman station only serves Loop Line, after 28 May, Loop Line ceased and replaced with Cikarang Loop Line.

=== Transjakarta ===
There are a number of Transjakarta routes that stop near the TOD area with a fare of Rp 3,500 (about 25 US cents) for regular class and Rp 20,000 (1.27 US dollars) for premium class known as RoyalTrans, as well as Rp 0 (no fare) microbus class known as Mikrotrans. The routes are:

- Regular
  - BRT routes
    - Corridor (Blok M - Kota), at Dukuh Atas shelter
    - Corridor (Ragunan - Balai Kota via Semanggi), at Dukuh Atas shelter
    - Corridor (Pulo Gadung - Galunggung), at Galunggung shelter
    - Corridor (Ragunan - Galunggung), at Galunggung shelter
  - Non-BRT feeder routes
    - Corridor (Blok M - Senen) towards Senen
    - Corridor (Tanah Abang - Pasar Minggu) towards Tanah Abang
- RoyalTrans premium class
  - Corridor (Cibubur - Balai Kota) towards Balai Kota
- Mikrotrans no fare microbus class
  - Corridor JAK 8 (ITC Roxy Mas–Pasar Bendungan Hilir)
  - Corridor JAK 9 (ITC Roxy Mas–Karet Tengsin)

=== MRT and LRT ===
The station is already integrated with the Dukuh Atas BNI MRT station of the Jakarta MRT and Jabodebek LRT on the Dukuh Atas Bank Syariah Indonesia LRT station via a multi-purpose crossing bridge. Passenger have to enter a separated paid area at the Sudirman railway station first before entering the crossing bridge to enter the LRT station.

=== Regular buses ===
Some regular buses also stops by the TOD area. All routes are towards Tanah Abang:

- Mayasari Bakti AC52 (Tanah Abang - Bekasi Timur)
- Mayasari Bakti AC52A (Tanah Abang - Jatiasih)
- Mayasari Bakti AC70 (Tanah Abang - Kampung Rambutan)
- Mayasari Bakti AC70A (Tanah Abang - Cileungsi)
- Mayasari Bakti (Tanah Abang - Ciawi)

== Incidents ==
- On 5 February 2018, BNI City Station was temporarily closed due to landslide around the airport which caused the Soekarno–Hatta Airport Rail Link temporarily stopping operations. On 8 February 2018, the station resumed services with 100 m-length speed restriction around the landslide point.

== See also ==
- Soekarno–Hatta International Airport
- Soekarno–Hatta Airport Rail Link
- KRL Commuterline

Preceding station	Kereta Api Indonesia	Following station
Tanah Abang	Jakarta Railway; THB–MRI	Sudirman towards Manggarai
