= Matraman railway station =

Railway station in Indonesia

Coordinates: 6.2124°S 106.8603°E

C14 Matraman Station Stasiun Matraman
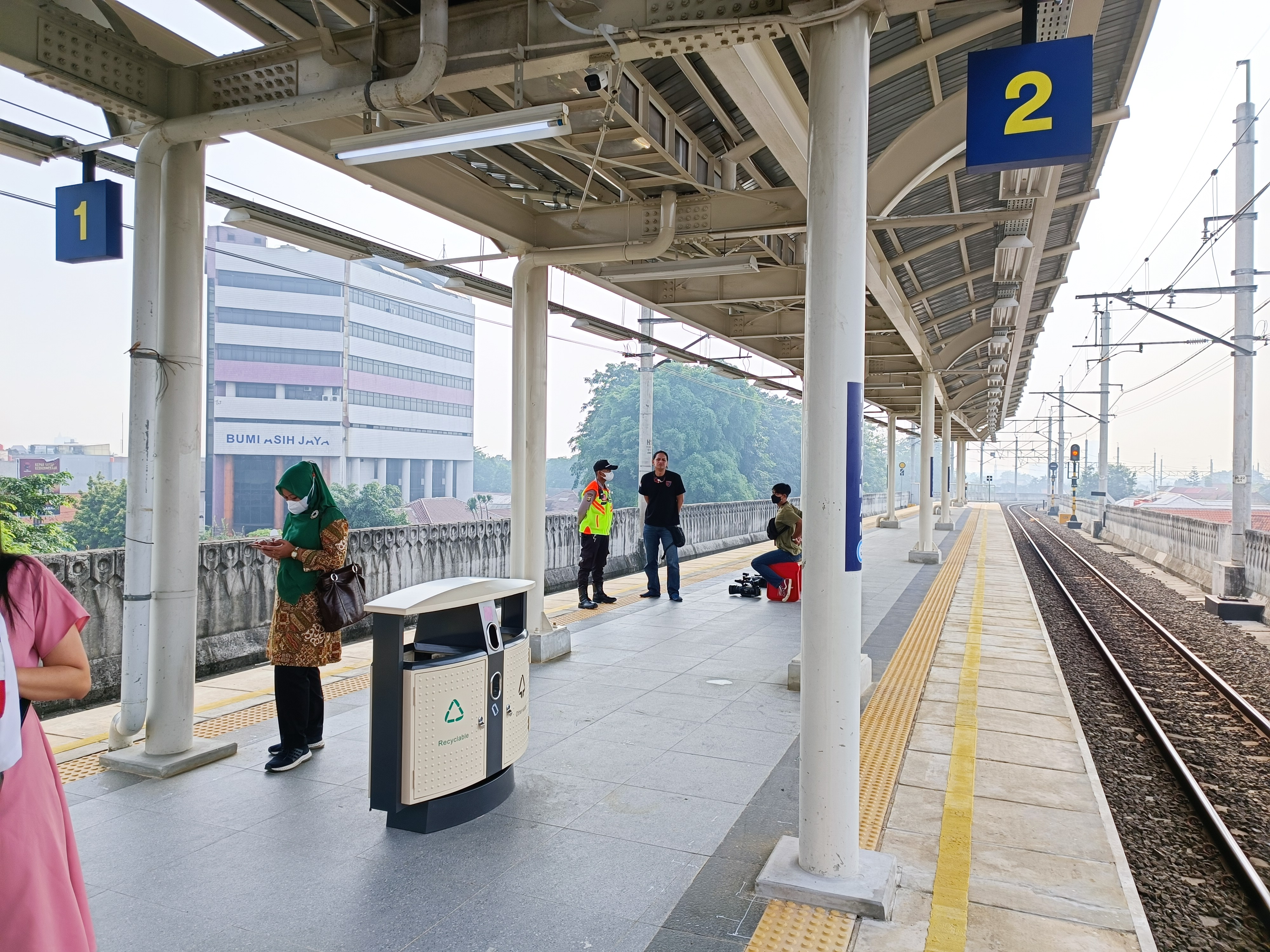
- The upper floor platform of Matraman Station

General information
- Location: Jalan Matraman Raya, Kebon Manggis, Matraman, East Jakarta, Jakarta 13320 Indonesia
- Owner: Kereta Api Indonesia
- Manager: Kereta Api Indonesia; KAI Commuter
- Line: Cikarang Loop Line
- Platforms: 1 high island platform
- Tracks: 2
- Connections: Matraman Baru

Construction
- Structure type: Elevated
- Parking: Available
- Accessible: Available

Other information
- Station code: MTR

History
- Opened: 17 June 2022 (public trial); 19 June 2022 (inauguration)

Services
Preceding station		Following station
Manggarai towards Angke or Kampung Bandan via Manggarai	Cikarang Commuter Line	Jatinegara towards Bekasi or Cikarang
Location

Matraman Station (MTR) is a railway station located on the border between the Kebon Manggis subdistrict (kelurahan), Matraman district (kecamatan) and Kampung Melayu, Jatinegara, East Jakarta, Indonesia, serving the Cikarang Loop Line of the KRL Commuterline system only. It is adjacent to the Gunung Antang localization area and was built as the part of the Manggarai–Cikarang doubled-double track project.

== History ==
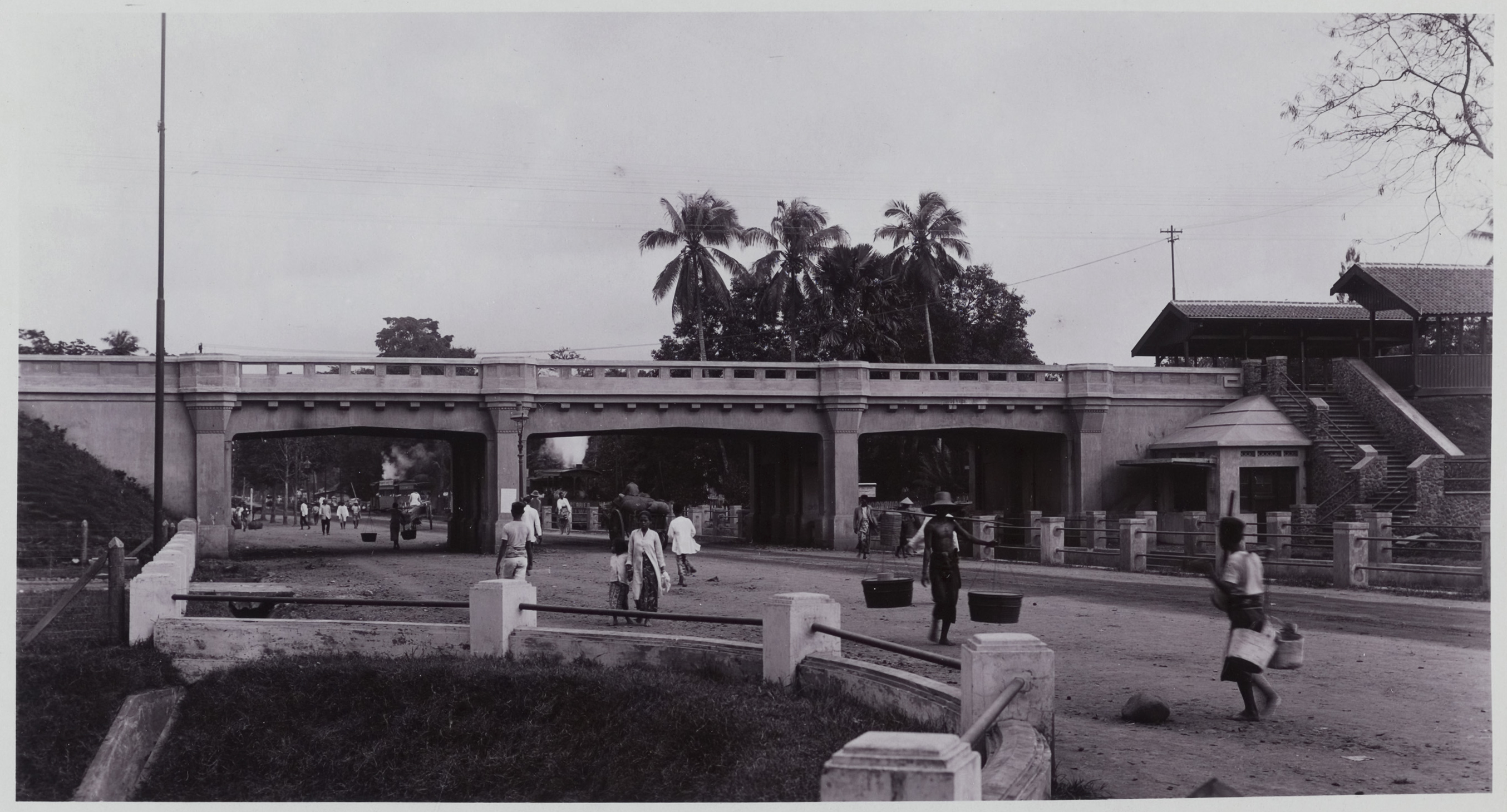
The Matraman viaduct during the Dutch colonial era. To the west (right of the photo) was the Meester Cornelis Kota/Kebon Pala Stop, which become the current location for the Matraman Station.

The plan for Matraman Station has been discussed since 2011, along with plans for new Mampang, Roxy, Tomang, and Bandengan stations. The discourse was then disclosed again in 2014, before the Manggarai–Cikarang double-double track project was still in the land acquisition stage.

Matraman Station was built near the former Kebon Pala Stop (km 1+471). The reason for its construction is to break up the passenger density at Manggarai and Jatinegara stations. Workers who work near Matraman Station can abord and alight from Matraman, thereby reducing the number of passengers in the aforementioned stations.

On 17 June 2022, the Directorate General of Railways conducted a trial of passenger services at Matraman Station. This trial was originally planned to start on 16 June 2022, but was pushed back. The trial lasted for a week. Two days later, on 19 June 2022, the Minister of Transportation Budi Karya Sumadi accompanied by the Indonesian Minister of Cooperatives and Small and Medium Enterprises Teten Masduki, inaugurated the Matraman Station. Also present at the soft launching were Director General of Railways Zulfikri, President Director of PT KAI Didiek Hartantyo, President Director of KAI Commuter Mukti Jauhari, representatives of disabilities, and a number of related officials.

== Building and layout ==
Matraman Station was made with the concept of a shelter (stop) because it only serves passengers going up and down and does not make arrangements for train travel like Jatinegara and Manggarai Stations. This station has only two railway lines.

This station has two floors. The 1st floor is a place to accommodate all facilities and shops, while the 2nd floor is the station platform.

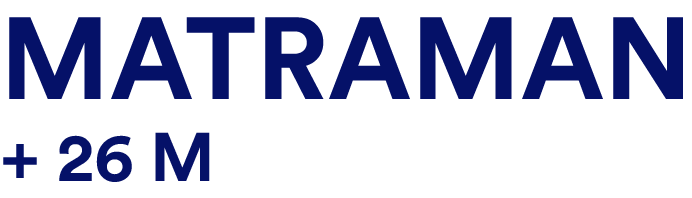
C14
Level 2	Line 1	← (Manggarai) Cikarang Loop Line (clockwise loop) towards Kampung Bandan
Level 2	Island platform, platform 1 and 2 doors are opened on the left side
Level 2	Line 2	Cikarang Loop Line (counterclockwise loop) to Cikarang (Jatinegara) →

== Services ==
=== Passenger services ===
==== KRL Commuterline ====
Train line name	Last destination	Notes
Cikarang Loop Line (half racket)	Angke	–
Cikarang Loop Line (half racket)	Kampung Bandan	–
Cikarang Loop Line (half racket)	Cikarang	–
Cikarang Loop Line (Cikarang–Jatinegara–Pasar Senen–Kampung Bandan–Manggarai–Jatinegara–Cikarang)	Cikarang	Counterclockwise trip
Cikarang Loop Line (Cikarang–Jatinegara–Manggarai–Kampung Bandan–Kemayoran–Jatinegara–Cikarang)	Cikarang	Clockwise trip

== Supporting transportation ==
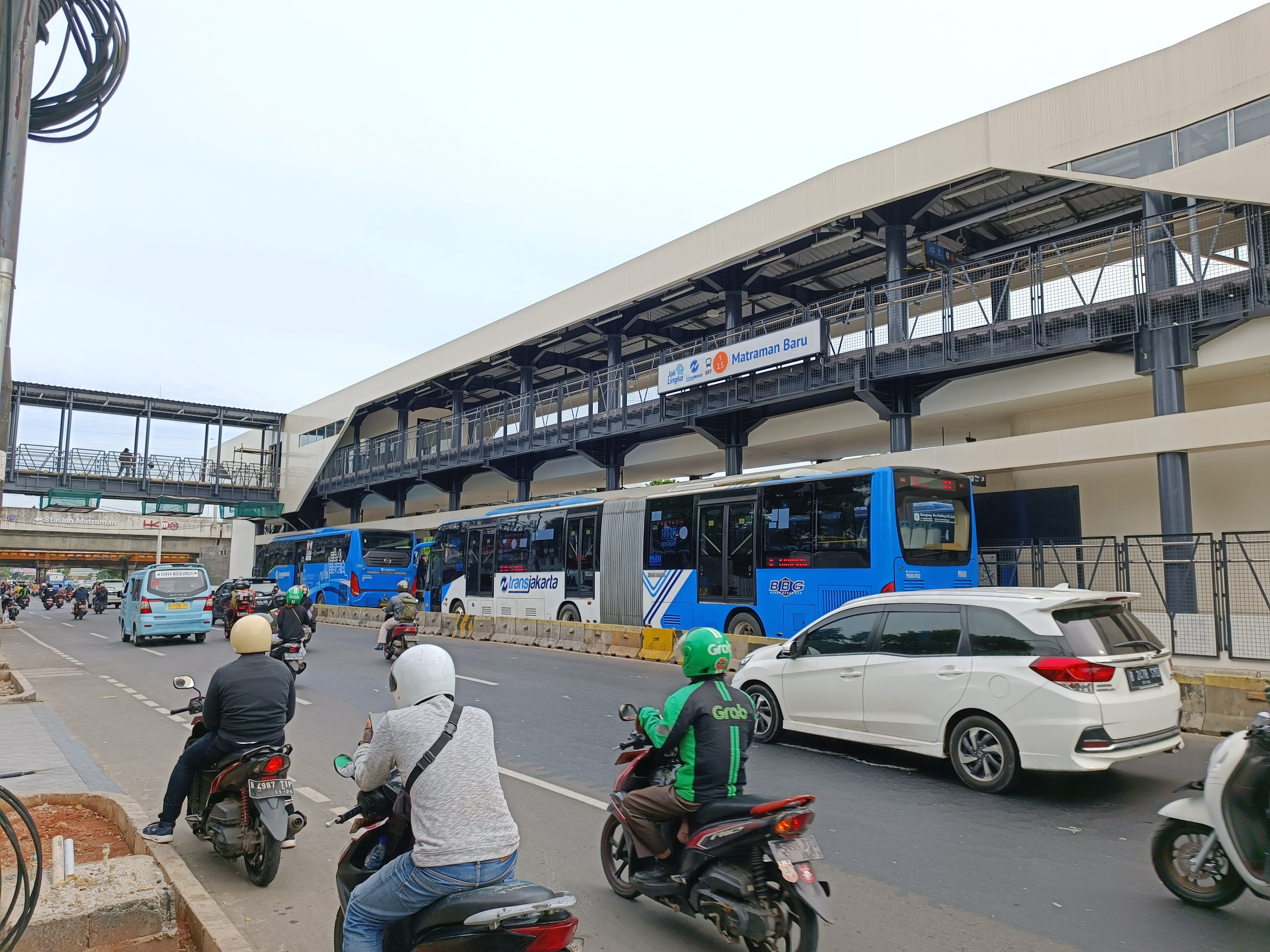
The Matraman Baru Transjakarta BRT station after being revitalized to be integrated with the Matraman Station.

The Matraman Station is integrated with Transjakarta buses at the Matraman Baru BRT station (formerly named Kebon Pala).

Transportation type	Station	Route	Destination
Transjakarta	Matraman Baru	List of Transjakarta corridors#Corridor 5	Ancol–Kampung Melayu
Transjakarta	Matraman Baru	List of Transjakarta corridors#Cross-corridor routes	Cililitan–Juanda
Transjakarta	Matraman Baru		Bekasi–Dukuh Atas via Becakayu Toll Road
Transjakarta	Matraman Baru		JIExpo Kemayoran–Kampung Melayu (only operates during the Jakarta Fair)
Mikrolet	N/A	M01	Kampung Melayu Bus Terminal—Senen Bus Terminal
Mikrolet	N/A	M01A	Kampung Melayu Bus Terminal—Senen Bus Terminal (via )
Regular Transjabodetabek	N/A	AC122 (Mayasari Bakti)	Senen Bus Terminal-Cikarang Bus Terminal
Regular Transjabodetabek	N/A	P9A (Mayasari Bakti)	Senen Bus Terminal-Bekasi Bus Terminal (via East Bekasi)

== Gallery ==
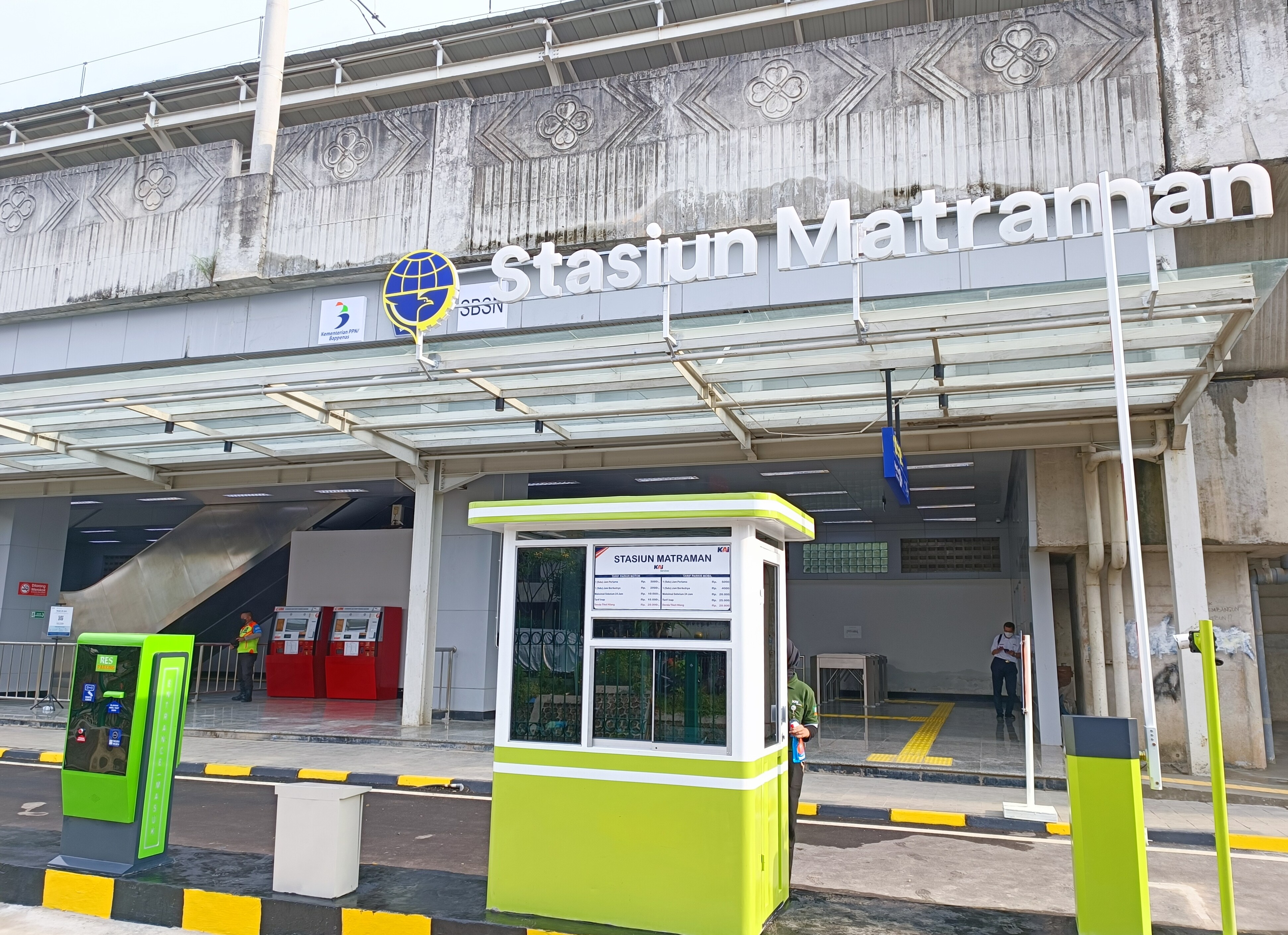
The entrance of the station

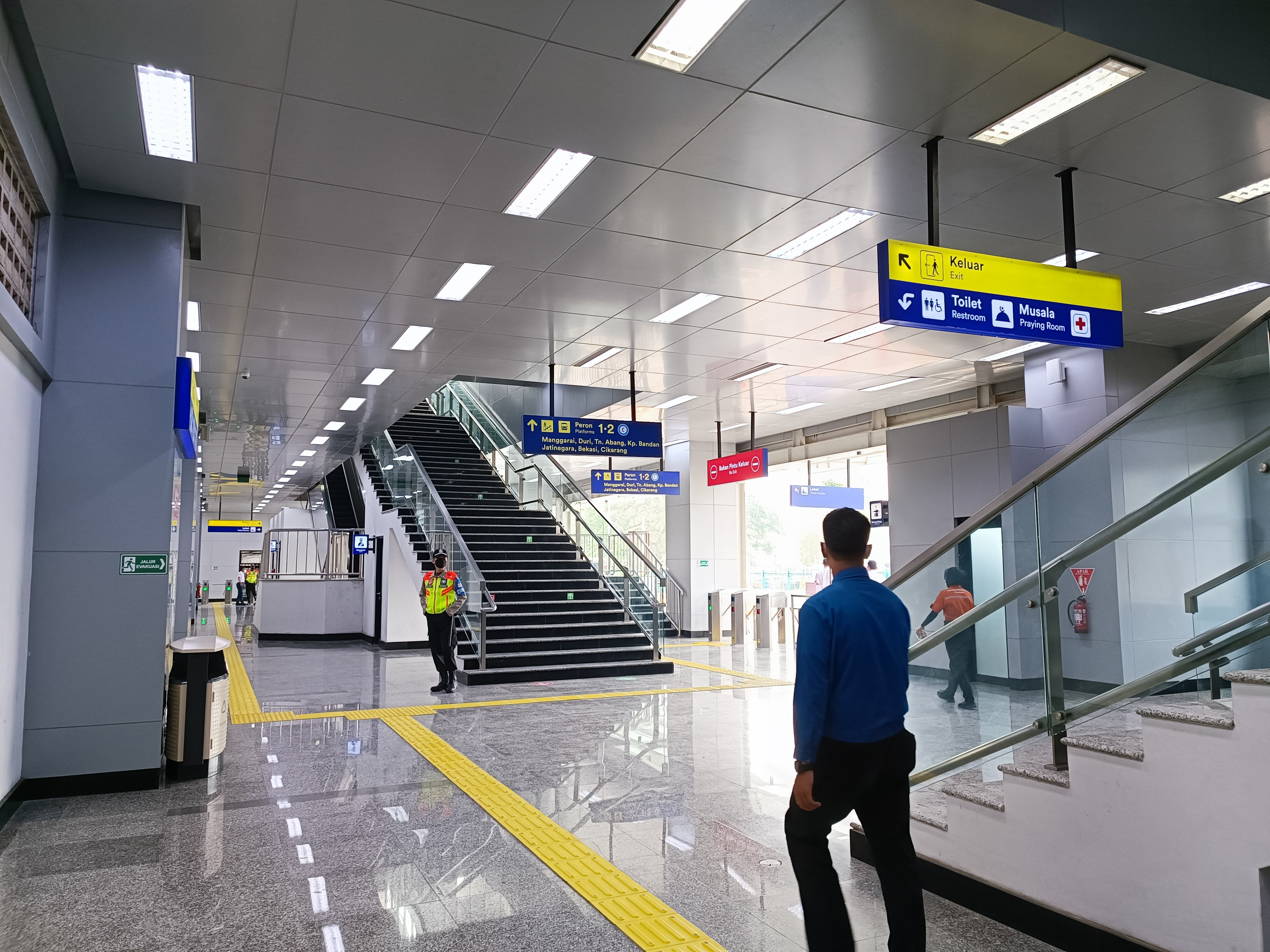
The ground floor of the station

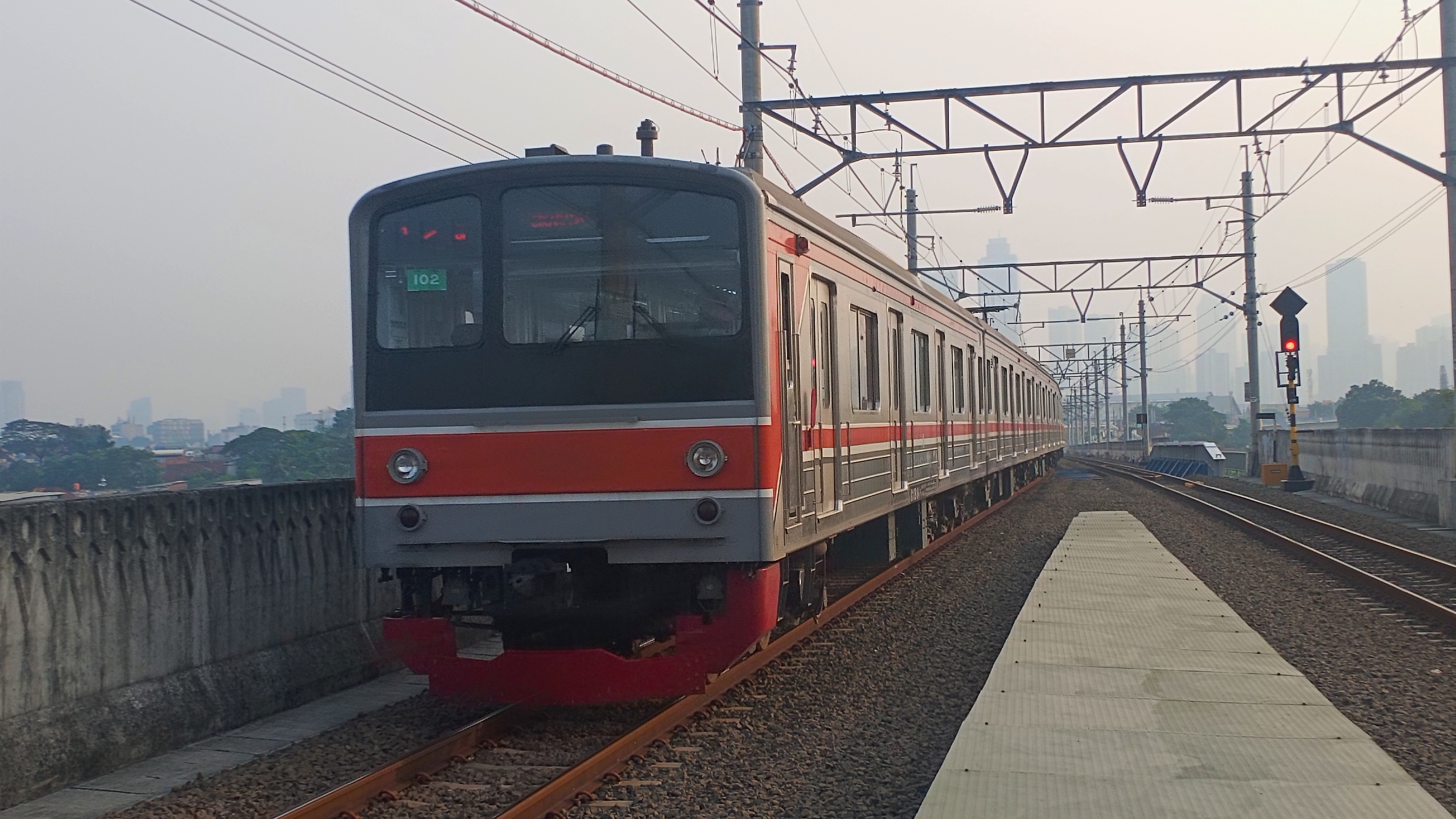
KAI Commuter JR205 train arriving at the station

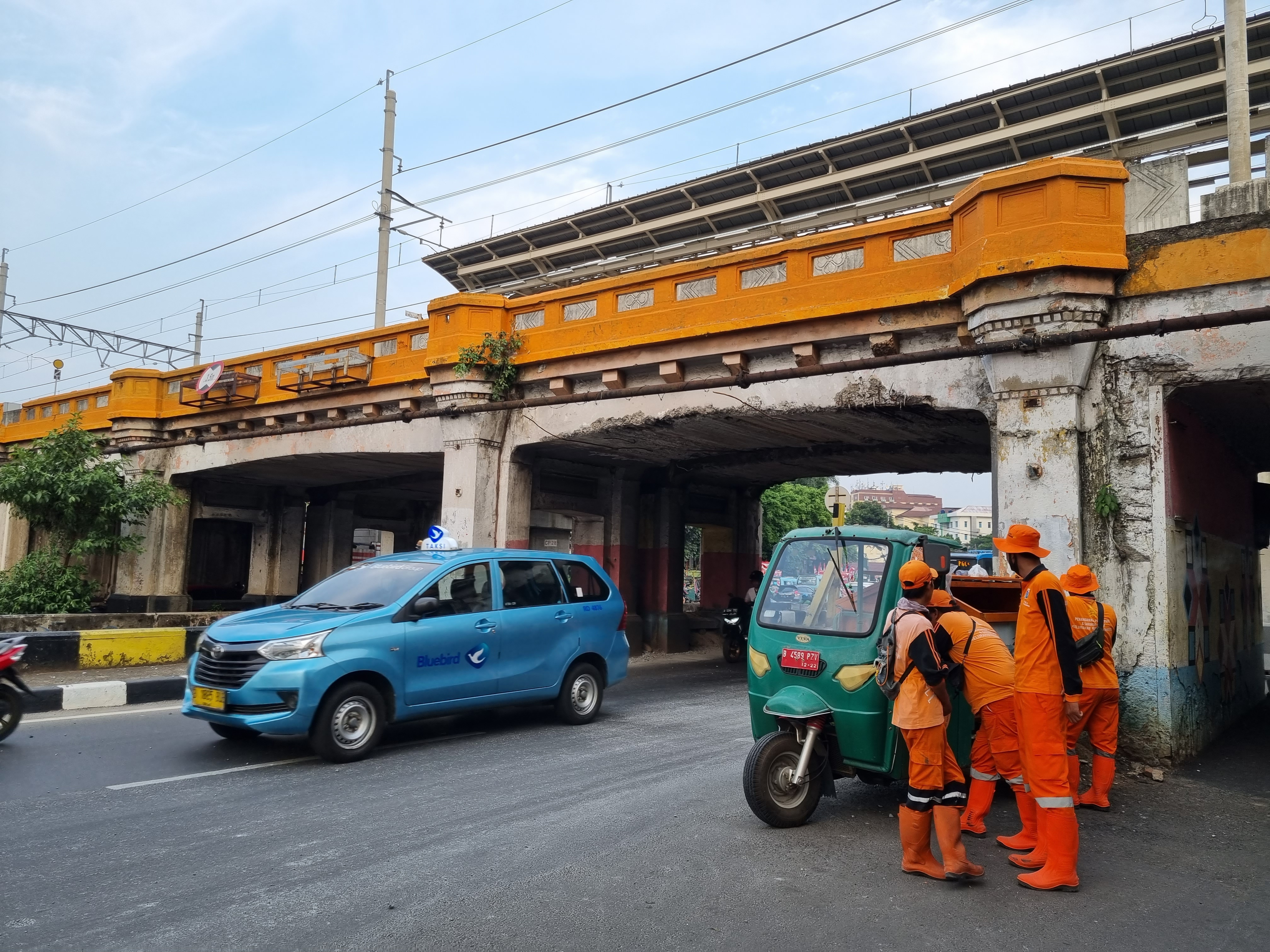
View of the station platform from under the Jatinegara Bridge/Viaduct

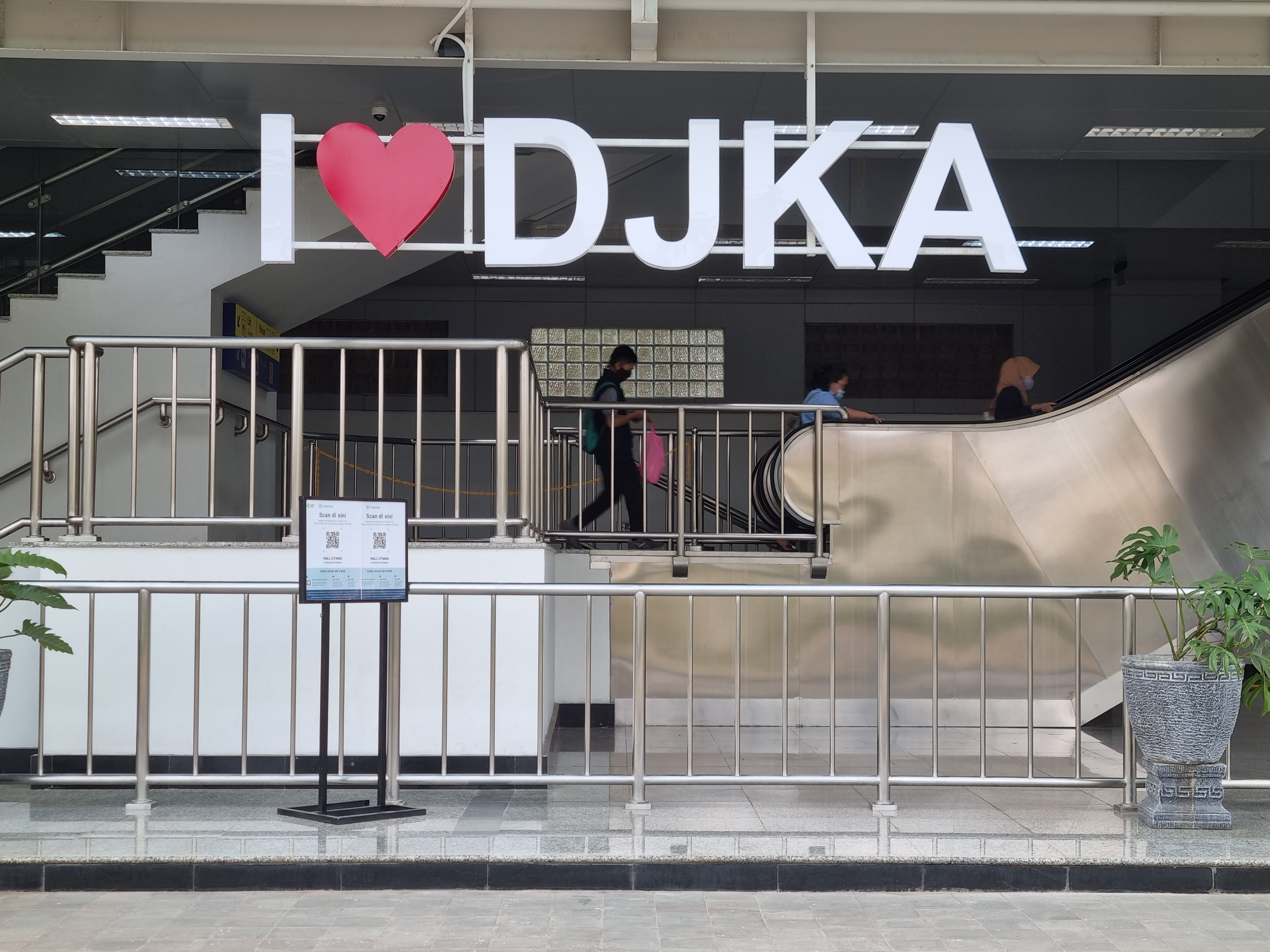
The "I ♥︎ DJKA" signage at the station's frontage. "DJKA" refers to the Directorate General of Railways of the Ministry of Transportation.

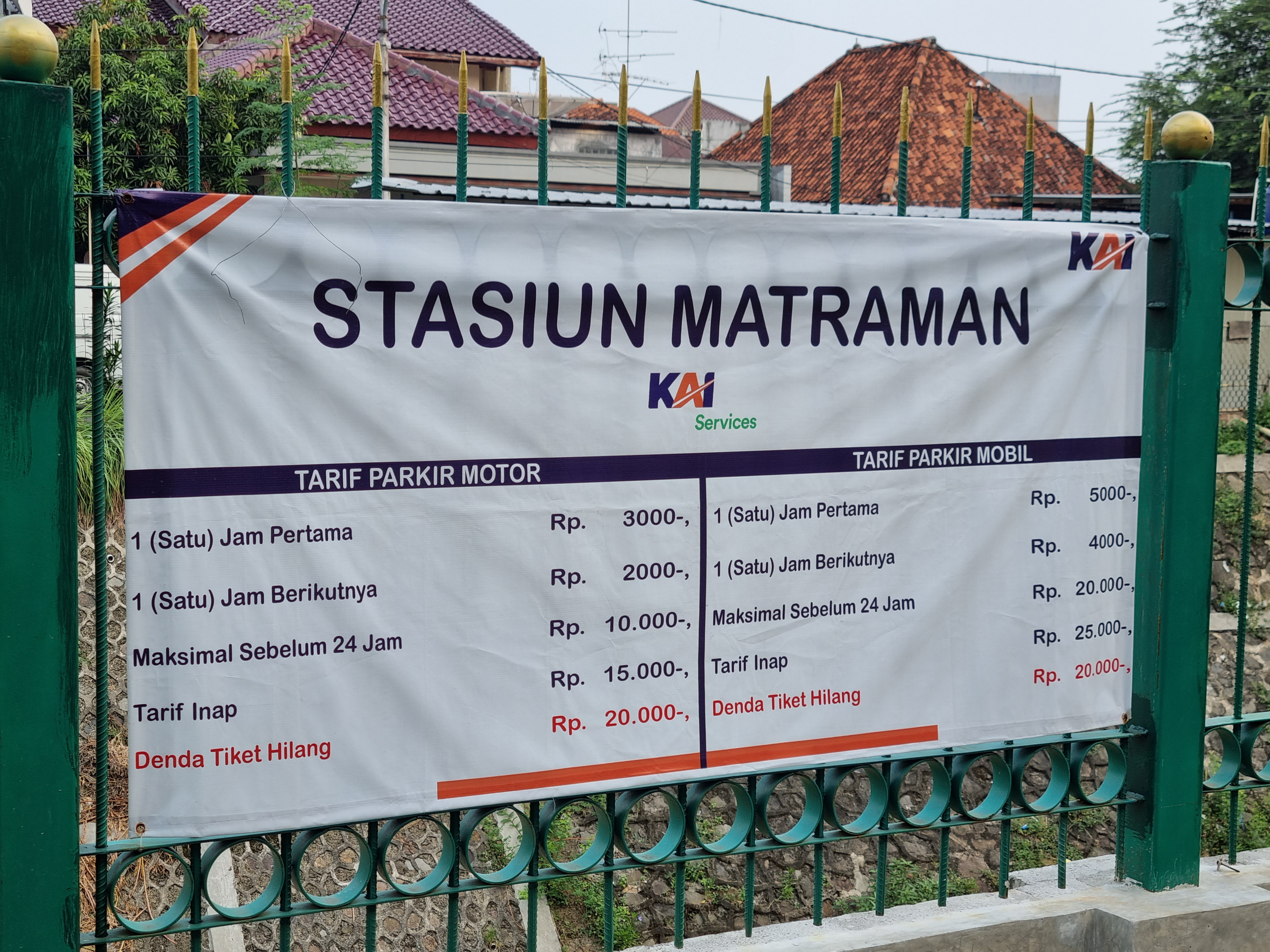
The banner showing parking rates at the station (as of 27 July 2022)
