= Manggarai railway station =

Railway station in Indonesia

B09 C13 A01 Manggarai Station Stasiun Manggarai
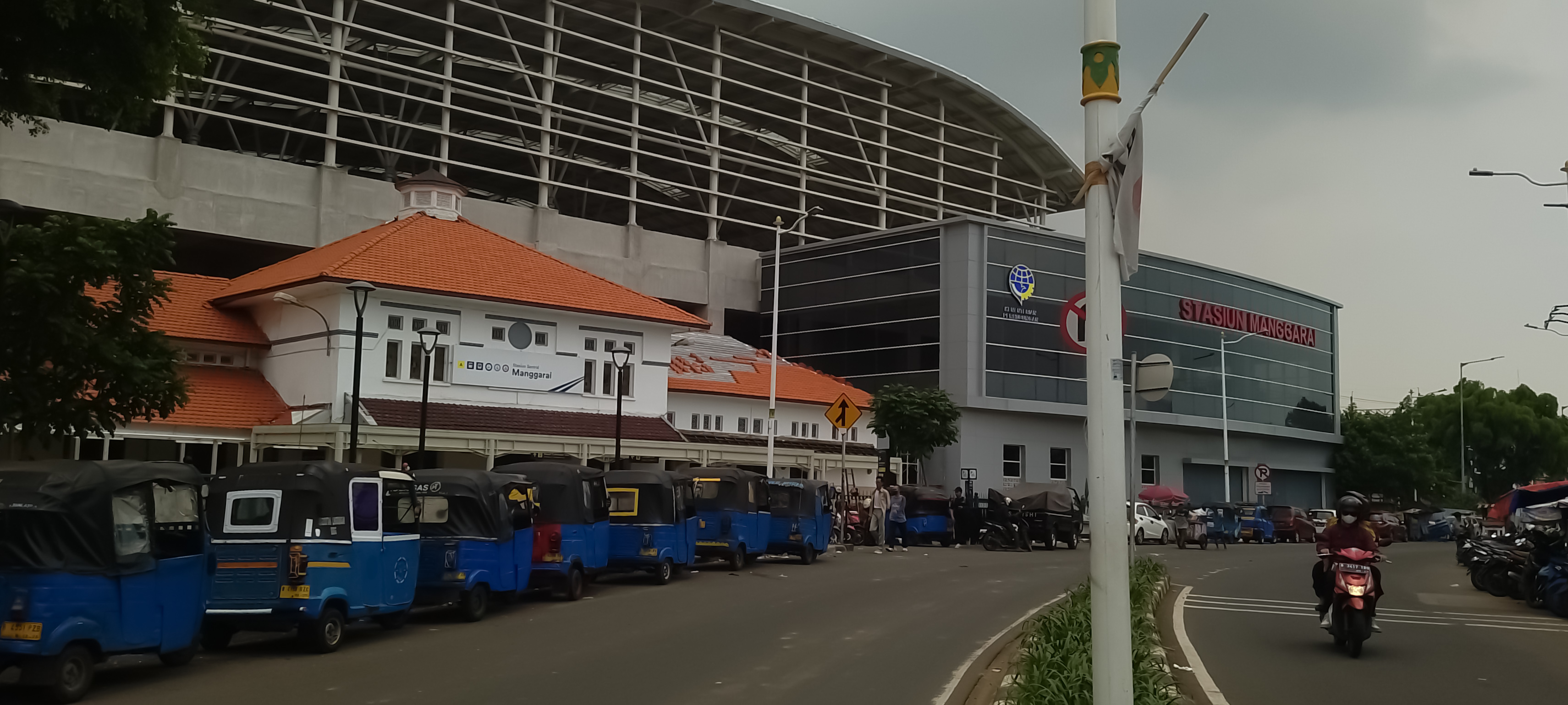
- Front view of Manggarai Station main building on the east side with text that reads "Manggarai Central Station" on the old building, March 2024.

General information
- Location: Jl. Manggarai Utara I, Manggarai, Tebet, South Jakarta; Indonesia
- Coordinates: 6.2099°S 106.8502°E
- Elevation: 13 m (43 ft)
- System: Commuter rail and airport rail link station
- Owner: Ministry of Transportation
- Operator: KAI Commuter (both KRL Commuterline and Soekarno-Hatta Airport Rail Link)
- Lines: Bogor Line; Cikarang Loop Line; Soekarno-Hatta Line
- Platforms: 6 island platforms 1 side platform
- Tracks: 13
- Connections: Manggarai

Construction
- Structure type: Elevated (Bogor Line); At-grade (Cikarang Loop Line and Airport Rail Link)
- Parking: Available
- Cycle facilities: Bicycle parking
- Accessible: Yes
- Architect: J. van Gendt (original)
- Architectural style: New Indies (original); Modern (new building)

Other information
- Station code: MRI • 0440
- Classification: Large type A

History
- Opened: 1 May 1918
- Electrified: 1 May 1927

Services
Preceding station		Following station
Cikini towards Jakarta Kota	Bogor Commuter Line	Tebet towards Bogor or Nambo
Sudirman towards Angke or Kampung Bandan via Manggarai	Cikarang Commuter Line	Matraman towards Bekasi or Cikarang
Terminus	Soekarno–Hatta Airport Commuter Line	BNI City towards SHIA
Location
- Location within Jakarta

S11 Manggarai LRT Station Stasiun LRT Manggarai
- Exterior view of Manggarai LRT station

General information
- Location: Sultan Agung St. Pasar Manggis, Setiabudi, South Jakarta, Jakarta, Indonesia
- System: Jakarta LRT
- Operator: Jakarta LRT
- Line: Southern Line
- Platforms: Two side platforms
- Tracks: 2
- Connections: Manggarai

Construction
- Structure type: Elevated
- Accessible: Yes

History
- Opening: 16 September 2026

Services
Preceding station	Jakarta LRT	Following station
Proklamasi towards Kelapa Gading	Southern Line	Terminus
Route map
Location

Manggarai Station (MRI) is a railway station complex at Manggarai, Tebet, South Jakarta, Jakarta, Indonesia. At present, it serves primarily as a transit station for KRL Commuterline's Bogor Line and Cikarang Loop Line, the Soekarno–Hatta Airport Rail Link, and the Jakarta LRT as well in a separated building connected via skybridge (though the connection bridge is not finished yet). As one of Jakarta's main transit stations, Manggarai has become increasingly congested on rush hours.

To the west of the main KRL Commuterline station building is the Manggarai LRT station of the Jakarta LRT system towards Kelapa Gading, which is the current terminus for phase 1B before an extension to Dukuh Atas is built.

To the south of the main building is the Manggarai Railway Workshop (Balai Yasa Manggarai), which is used for routine maintenance and repair of passenger trains. It also functions as a storage area for large trains with a train depot. Many executive, business, and economy class trains are stored in this depot before they are sent to Pasar Senen and Gambir stations to begin their journey. The Bukit Duri depot is located southeast of the station, used for storing and daily maintenance of various EMUs for the Commuterline system. This depot initially also kept diesel locomotives, but all of them were moved to another depot in Cipinang, East Jakarta.

Currently, the main KRL Commuterline station is undergoing massive upgrade into a large three-storey central station. After its completion, Manggarai will be the largest railway station in Indonesia, and will replace Gambir as the terminus for most intercity trains. There will also be a housing complex, a commercial complex, central business district and a 5-star hotel surrounding the station.

== History ==
=== 20th century ===
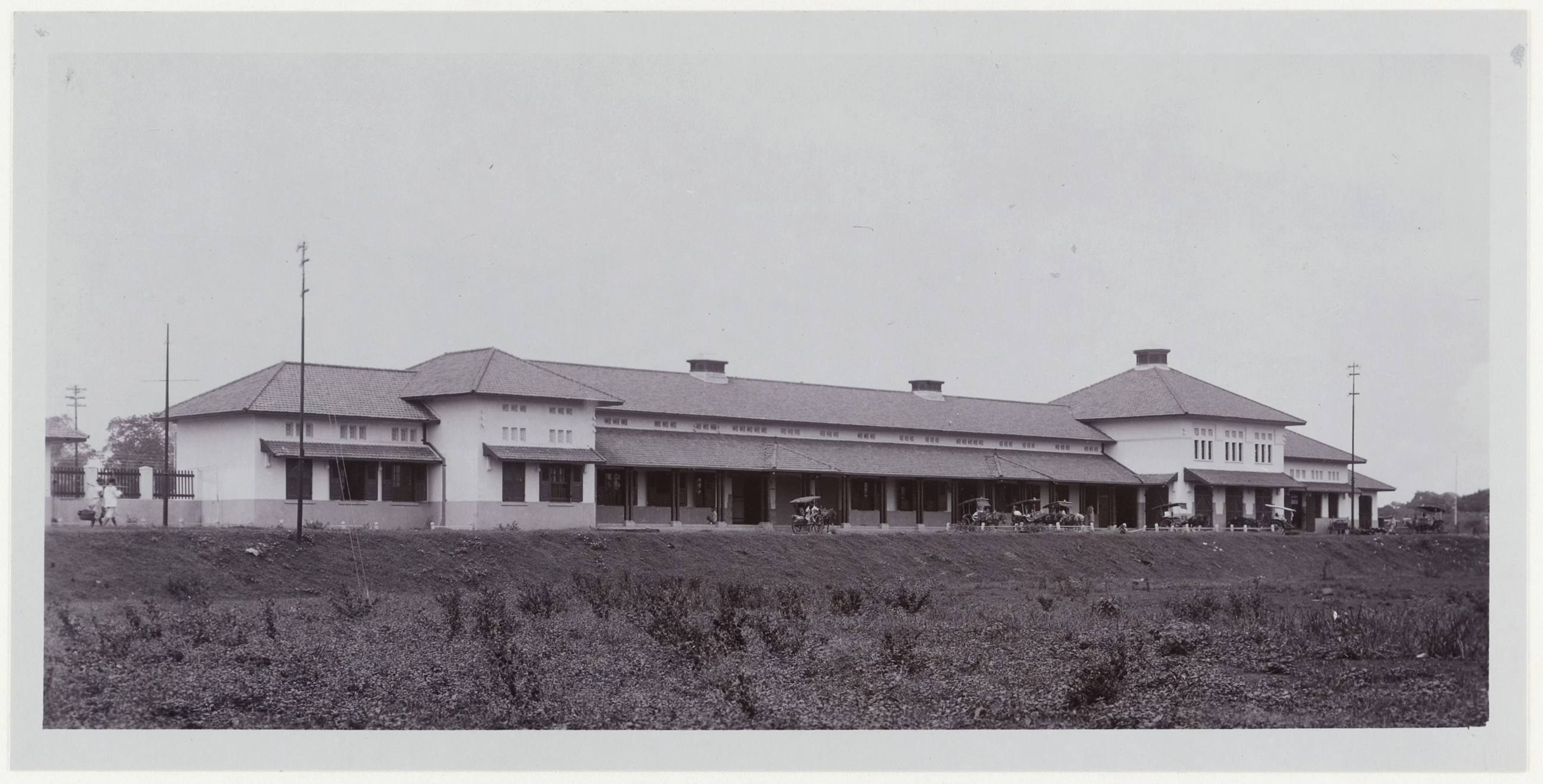
The Manggarai Station at c. 1920

The region of Manggarai has already been known since the 17th century. It is the residence and market for slaves from Manggarai, Flores which later developed into Gemeente Meester Cornelis. Although the Batavia—Buitenzorg line was built by the Nederlands-Indische Spoorweg Maatschappij (NIS) in 1873, Manggarai Station was built in 1914 and completed on 1 May 1918.

The construction was not fully finished when it was first opened — World War I in Europe delayed the delivery of certain parts of its roof. Its tracks branched to Meester Cornelis (Jatinegara), Tanah Abang, and continued to Bandung. The construction was supervised by Van Grendt, who also designed the railway education school building and official residences for employees around the station area. The first class waiting room has not changed since the 1910s. The station replaced the second Meester Cornelis Station, which was located a few hundred meters to the south.

The station witnessed an episode of Indonesian National Revolution, when on 3 January 1946 the extraordinary train (Indonesian: Kereta Luar Biasa or KLB) transported the entourage of President Sukarno to Yogyakarta. Secret preparations were made, including placing of rows of freight carriages on track 1. At around seven o'clock in the evening, the KLB passed very slowly from the direction of Pegangsaan through track 4.

=== Central station development ===
Until 2012, Manggarai had already serving both intercity trains and the KRL Commuterline. Major reformations of the KRL in 2011 had resulted a significant occupancy escalation, encouraging KAI to rearrange the railway traffic. Some intercity trains like Brantas, Bengawan, and Kutojaya Utara used to stop here before terminating at Tanah Abang until they were moved to Pasar Senen since 2013; since then, Manggarai has stopped serving intercity trains. Despite that, Argo Parahyangan remained stopping at Manggarai, according the 2014 Railway Travel Chart (Grafik Perjalanan Kereta Api, GAPEKA).

On 12 August 2016, PT KAI Commuter Jabodetabek, together with fans of KRL Commuterline discussed the Manggarai Central Station development plan. To answer the complaints of the passenger queue, which continues to increase every year, the completion of the Cikarang–Manggarai double-double track was accelerated. In addition, this station will be made multi-storey, which can accommodate inter-city trains and commuter trains with their respective tracks and platforms. It is expected to become the central station for the KRL Commuterline and also the terminus for the Soekarno–Hatta Airport Rail Link.

Later, the Directorate General of Railways (Indonesian: Direktorat Jenderal Perkeretaapian or DJKA) of the Ministry of Transportation began expanding the station in 2017 by adding a new three-storey building with a modern minimalist futuristic architecture. The old building, a legacy of Staatsspoorwegen, is maintained because of its status as a cultural heritage. By the completion of the central station development, it is planned that all long and medium-distance inter-city passenger trains that terminate at Gambir will be moved to Manggarai.

To accommodate Soekano–Hatta Airport Rail Link extension BNI City to Manggarai (previously it was extended to Bekasi for several months after opening), the west entrance building was constructed. Once completed, Manggarai Station officially served the airport rail link passengers on 5 October 2019.

The first phase of the Manggarai Central Station development was inaugurated by the President of Indonesia, Joko Widodo, on 26 December 2022. The second phase of the Manggarai Central Station development commenced construction in 2023. This aims to build platforms on the second floor above the Cikarang line platforms. These platforms will be used for long distance trains and when operational will replace Gambir Station. While initially planned for a 2025 inauguration, Manggarai Station is expected to start intercity services by the end of 2027.

==== Jakarta LRT ====
On 30 October 2023, the Jakarta LRT phase 1B officially broke ground as an extension of the existing Kelapa Gading–Velodrome route to Manggarai. Construction finished by mid-August 2026. The LRT extension to Manggarai, as well as Manggarai LRT station itself was originally set to be opened on 26 August 2026, but was ultimately postponed until further notice, citing unfinished facilities including the transfer skybridge from the main KRL Commuterline station and Transjakarta BRT station. On 16 September 2026, Manggarai LRT station and the LRT line extension was inaugurared by President Prabowo Subianto.

== Building and layout ==
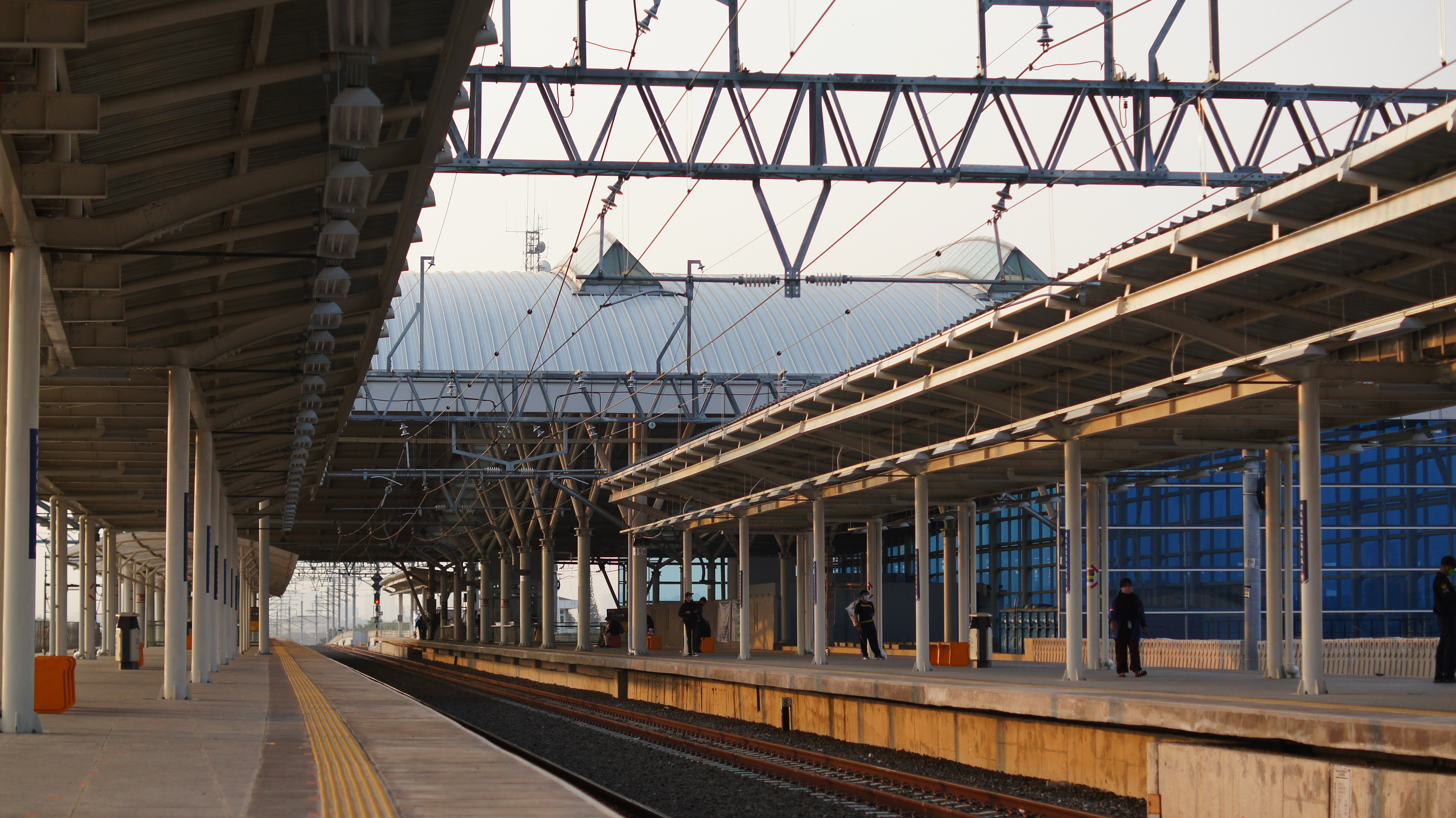
The third floor of Manggarai Station

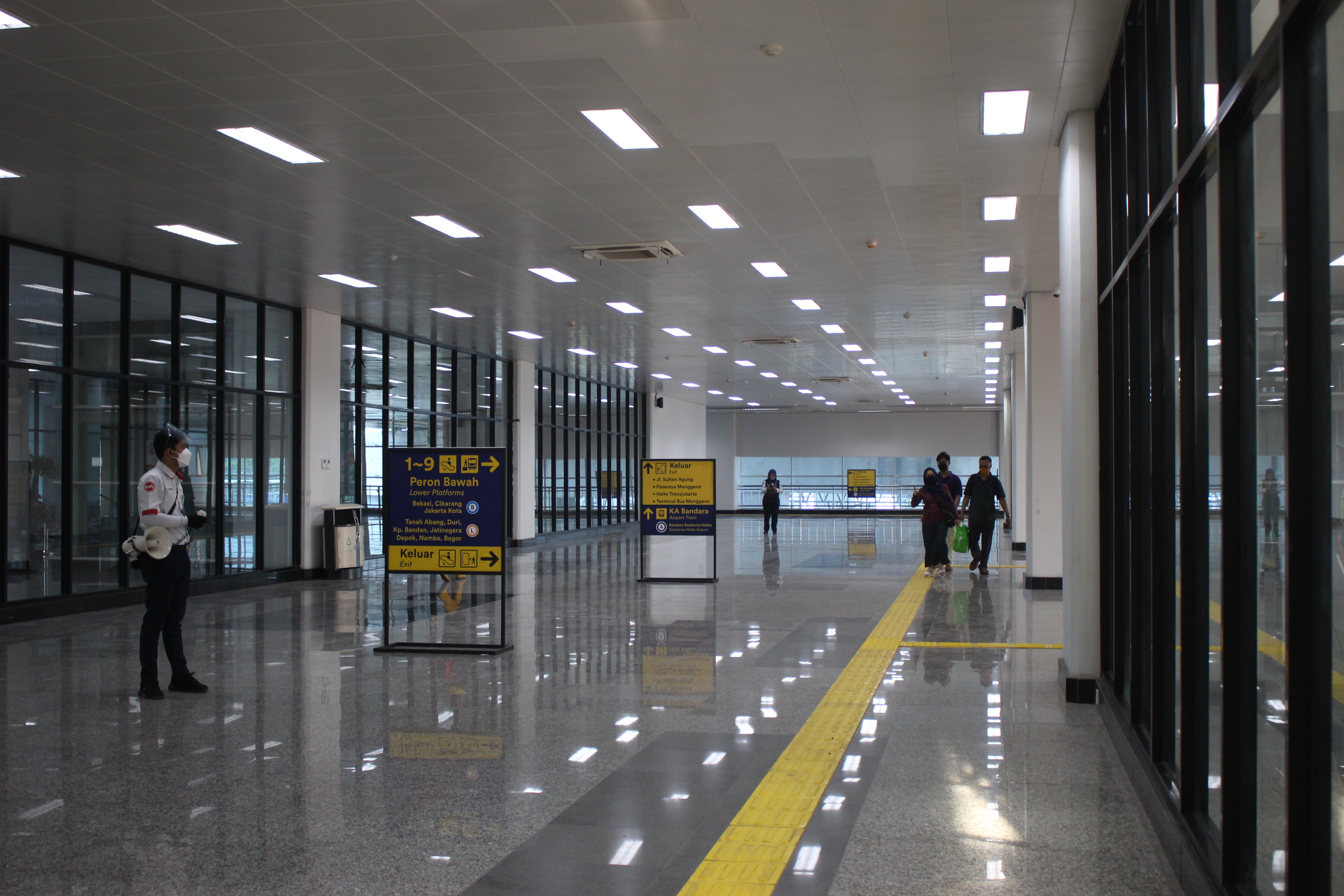
The station concourse on the second floor

The Manggarai Station main building has three floors: the first includes the lower platforms and rails for trains making stops at the station, the second floor is dedicated for passenger amenities and commercial areas, and the third floor is function as the upper platform, serving the same purpose as the first one. The building is built in a modern and minimalist design; it has curved-shaped roof, with glass cellings and facade to optimize natural lighting from the sunlight. The original building on the east since 1918 is retained as a cultural heritage. The heritage building is designed by Dutch architect J. van Gendt in the New Indies style (Nieuwe Indische Bouwstijl), a fusion between 20th-century European modernism and Indonesian vernacular architecture.

Manggarai Station had nine train tracks that were used for EMU stops plus one track each to the Train Affairs Supervisor, Bukit Duri Depot, and Manggarai Railway Workshop. Tracks 1 and 2 are dedicated to trains operating on the Cikarang Line, while tracks 3 and 4 serve as straight routes for inter-city trains and additional stops for Cikarang Line trains. Tracks 5-7 are allocated for trains on the Bogor Line, and tracks 8 and 9 are designated for stops on the Soekarno–Hatta Airport Rail Link.

As of 25 September 2021, the first phase of the station's development has been completed. It is in the form of a new multi-storey building that was built on the west side along with the upper tracks consisting of four railway tracks, so that the number of station tracks has increased to thirteen tracks. Simultaneously, the Central Line was renamed to Bogor Line and it was transferred to the upper tracks, which was numbered tracks 10 to 13. Tracks 10 and 11 were turning and straight tracks for KRL Commuterline to Jakarta Kota, while tracks 12 and 13 are straight and turning tracks, respectively, for the KRL Commuterline to Bogor. In addition, access to the platform through the main door on the west side is also integrated with Transjakarta via Manggarai BRT Station. As of 20 December 2023, inter-platform level crossing has been permanently closed and the heritage building returned to serve as the east ticket counter for KRL passengers.

A05 B09 C13
2nd floor
Line 9
← (Cikini) Bogor Line to Jakarta Kota
Single island platform, platform 9 doors are opened on the left side
platform 10 doors are opened on the right side
Line 10
← (Cikini) Bogor Line to Jakarta Kota

Straight tracks directly to Jakarta Kota

Line 11
Bogor Line to Bogor/Nambo (Tebet) →

Straight tracks directly to Bogor

single island platform, platform 11 doors are opened on the right side
platform 12 doors are opened on the left side
Line 12
Bogor Line to Bogor/Nambo (Tebet) →
G
West Ticket Gates, ticket vending machines, and ticket counters (KRL Commuterline and Airport rail link)
G
East gate, ticket gates, ticket vending machines, ticket counters, dan retail kiosk (KRL Commuterline), and cultural heritage building
Line 1
← (Sudirman) Cikarang Loop Line (clockwise loop) towards Kampung Bandan
Single island platform
Line 2
← (Sudirman) Cikarang Loop Line (clockwise loop) towards Kampung Bandan

Straight tracks directly to Jakarta Kota

Line 3
Straight tracks directly to Jatinegara
Cikarang Loop Line (counterclockwise loop) to Cikarang (Matraman) →
Single island platform
Line 4
Cikarang Loop Line (counterclockwise loop) to Cikarang (Matraman) →
Line 5
← Tracks for logistic trains and extraordinary train cart delivery
Inactive island platform
Line 6
Tracks for logistic trains and extraordinary train cart delivery →
Line 7
← (BNI City) Soekarno–Hatta Airport Rail Link to Soekarno–Hatta International Airport
Island platform, platform doors are opened on the left side
Line 8
← (BNI City) Soekarno–Hatta Airport Rail Link to Soekano–Hatta International Airport
Side platform (for Airport Rail Link), platform doors are opened on the left side

Access line to Manggarai railway workshop
West Gate

=== Jakarta LRT station ===
Manggarai's LRT station is built separated and is located 300 meters from the western entrance of the main station building. It lies further west from the Manggarai bus station and straddled above a three-way junction. It is an elevated station with two side platforms and a concourse below. A direct connection to the LRT station through a skybridge passing through the bus terminal is currently under construction.

S11 Manggarai
2nd floor
Single side platform, platform doors are opened on the left side

Line 1
Southern Line to Kelapa Gading (Proklamasi) →

Straight tracks directly to Kelapa Gading

Line 2
Southern Line to Kelapa Gading (Proklamasi) →

Straight tracks directly to Kelapa Gading

Single side platform, platform doors are opened on the right side

1st floor
Ticket Gates, ticket vending machines, and ticket counters (Jakarta LRT)

G
Exit and entry

== Services ==
The following is a list of train services at the Manggarai Station.

=== Passenger services ===
==== KAI Commuter ====
Train line name	Last destination	Notes
Upper floor
Bogor Line	Jakarta Kota	-
Bogor Line	Bogor	-
Bogor Line	Nambo	Only a few trips
Lower floor
Cikarang Loop Line (half racket)	Angke	-
Cikarang Loop Line (half racket)	Kampung Bandan	-
Cikarang Loop Line (half racket)	Cikarang	-
Cikarang Loop Line (Note: via Pasar Senen (Cikarang—Jatinegara—Pasar Senen—Kampung Bandan—Manggarai—Jatinegara—Cikarang))	Cikarang	Counter clockwise trip
Cikarang Loop Line (Note: via Manggarai (Cikarang—Jatinegara—Manggarai—Kampung Bandan—Kemayoran—Jatinegara—Cikarang))	Cikarang	Clockwise trip
Soekarno–Hatta Airport Rail Link	Manggarai	-
Soekarno–Hatta Airport Rail Link	SHIA	-

==== Jakarta LRT ====
Train line name	Last destination	Notes
Southern Line	Manggarai	Separated building
Southern Line	Kelapa Gading	Separated building

== Supporting transportation ==
Public transport type	Station	Route	Destination
Transjakarta	Manggarai	List of Transjakarta corridors#Corridor 4	Pulo Gadung—Galunggung
Transjakarta	Manggarai	List of Transjakarta corridors#Cross-corridor routes	Pulo Gadung—Patra Kuningan
Transjakarta	N/A	(Metrotrans)	Manggarai Station—University of Indonesia
Transjakarta	N/A	(non-BRT)	Manggarai Bus Terminal—Blok M Bus Terminal
Transjakarta	N/A	(non-BRT)	Bekasi–Galunggung
Mikrotrans Jak Lingko	N/A	JAK-86	Rawamangun Bus Terminal–Manggarai Bus Terminal
JR Connexion (Perum DAMRI)	N/A	x9	Bogor Station—Manggarai Station

== Criticisms and controversies ==
After undergoing a major overhaul and renovation, in early 2023 the Directorate General of Railways (DJKA, see above) of Ministry of Transportation installed an embossed accessory letter that reads "I ♡ DJKA" as the final touch, which is also installed at Matraman Station. The installation caused controversy because KRL Commuterline passengers questioned its importance. The directorate general considers that these accessories only aim to "motivate their employees to work even harder." A member of the Anak Kereta community (frequent passengers of KRL Commuterline) responded to this problem that DJKA only felt like appreciating themselves, while passengers continued to criticize a number of performances that had to be evaluated such as the escalators which often experienced disturbances. After receiving harsh criticism, the installation, located on the second floor, were removed on 22 February 2023.

== Incidents ==
On 24 June 2022, a passenger on the KRL Commuterline fell under the platform. It is said that the passenger fell when the passenger was about to enter KRL 5551 on the Cikarang–Kampung Bandan service of Cikarang Loop Line on the platform of tracks 6-7 of Manggarai Station. This triggered panic among all passengers at the station, considering the train was passing when the victim fells. Luckily, the victim survived and was immediately taken to the station health post to be given first aid. After being treated and confirming that the passenger's health is in good condition, the passenger resumed its journey using the train.

On 8 July 2022, two weeks after the previous incident, a child fell under the track of 6 platform at Manggarai Station while boarding the KRL TM 6000 New Livery along with the child's mother and young sister. The child was immediately rescued by the internal security officer (PKD), it was suspected that the child had fallen due to the train's full capacity as a result of the adjustment after the route change.

== In popular culture ==
Manggarai railway station is used as a background on horror movie, Kereta Setan Manggarai and Kereta Hantu Manggarai. Both films are based from an urban legend which circulating in the station.

== Gallery ==
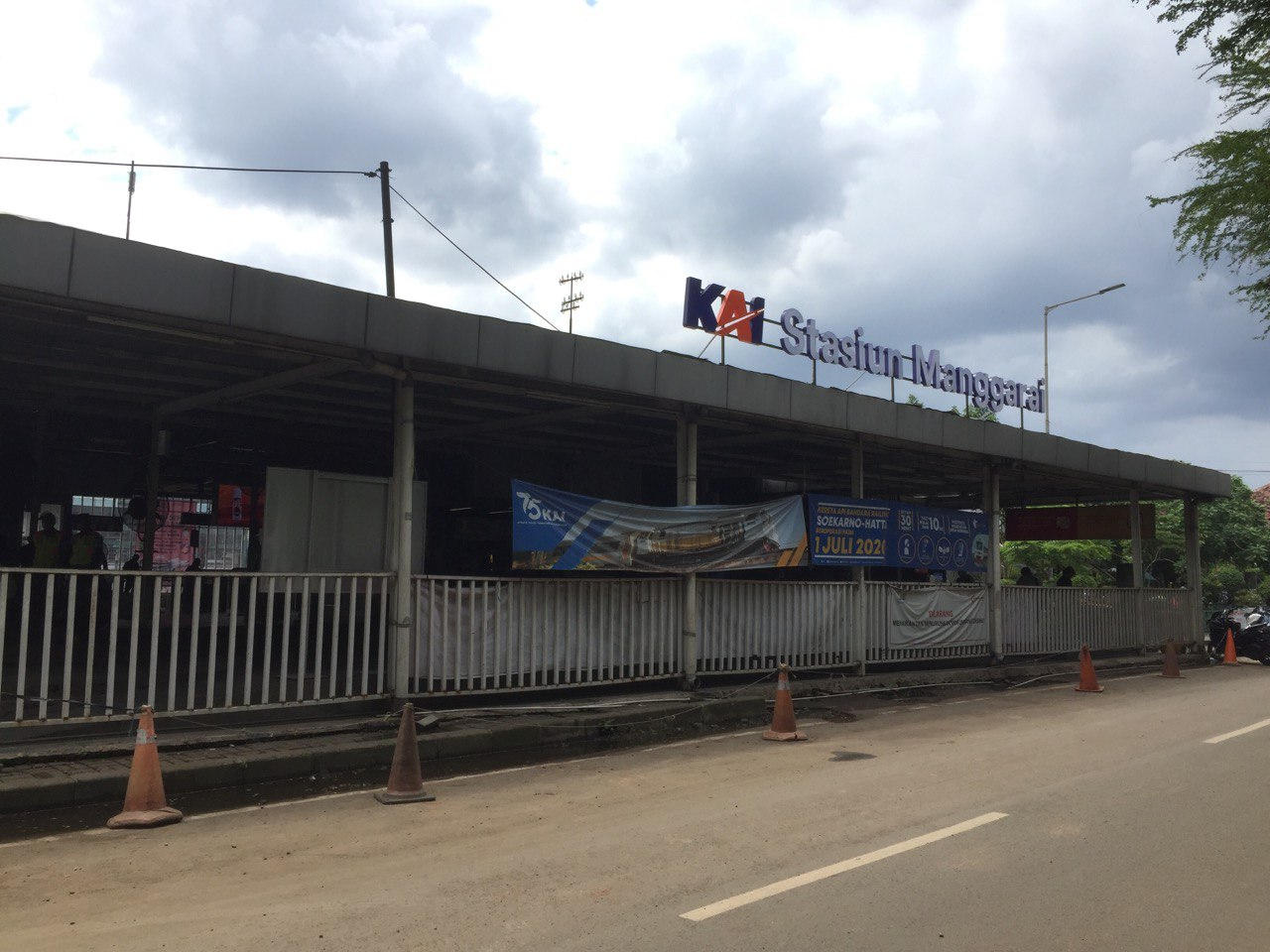
The east entrance of the Manggarai station, 2020

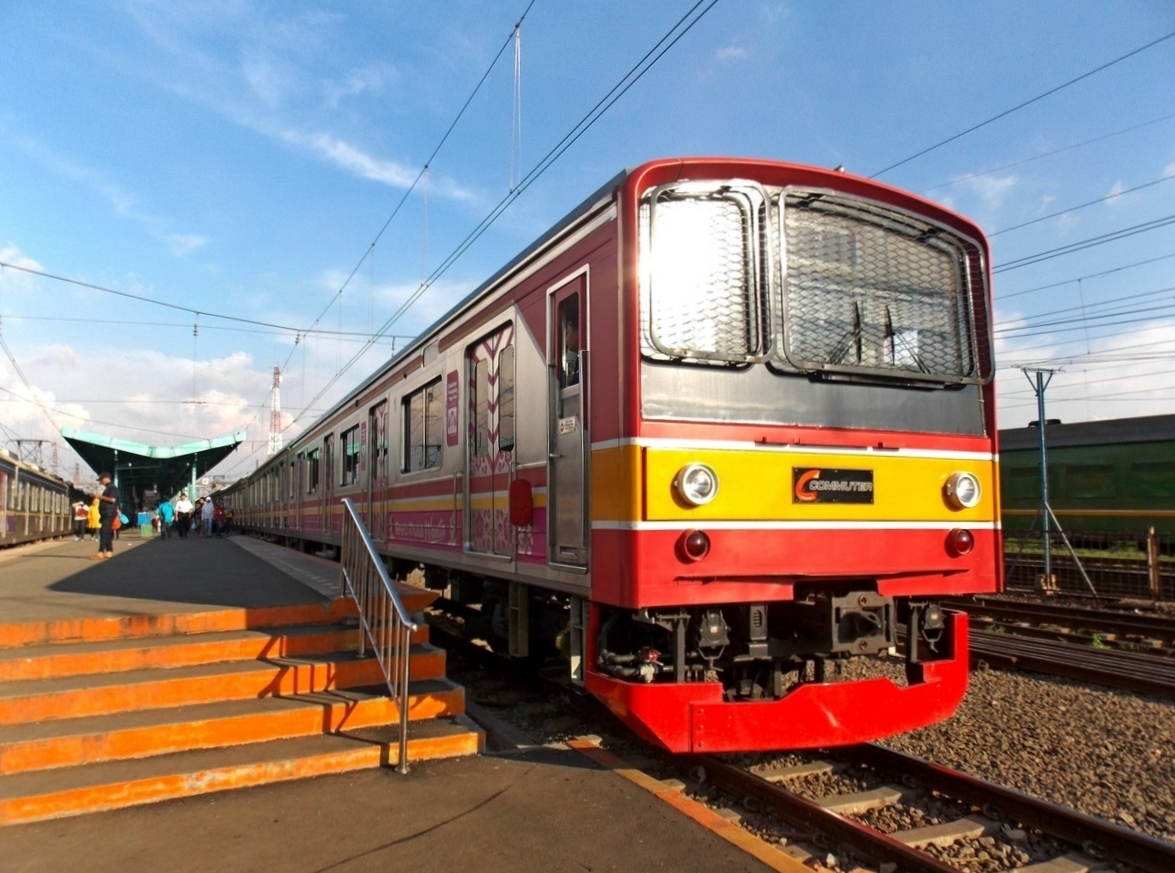
The KRL Commuterline's 205 series at the Manggarai Station

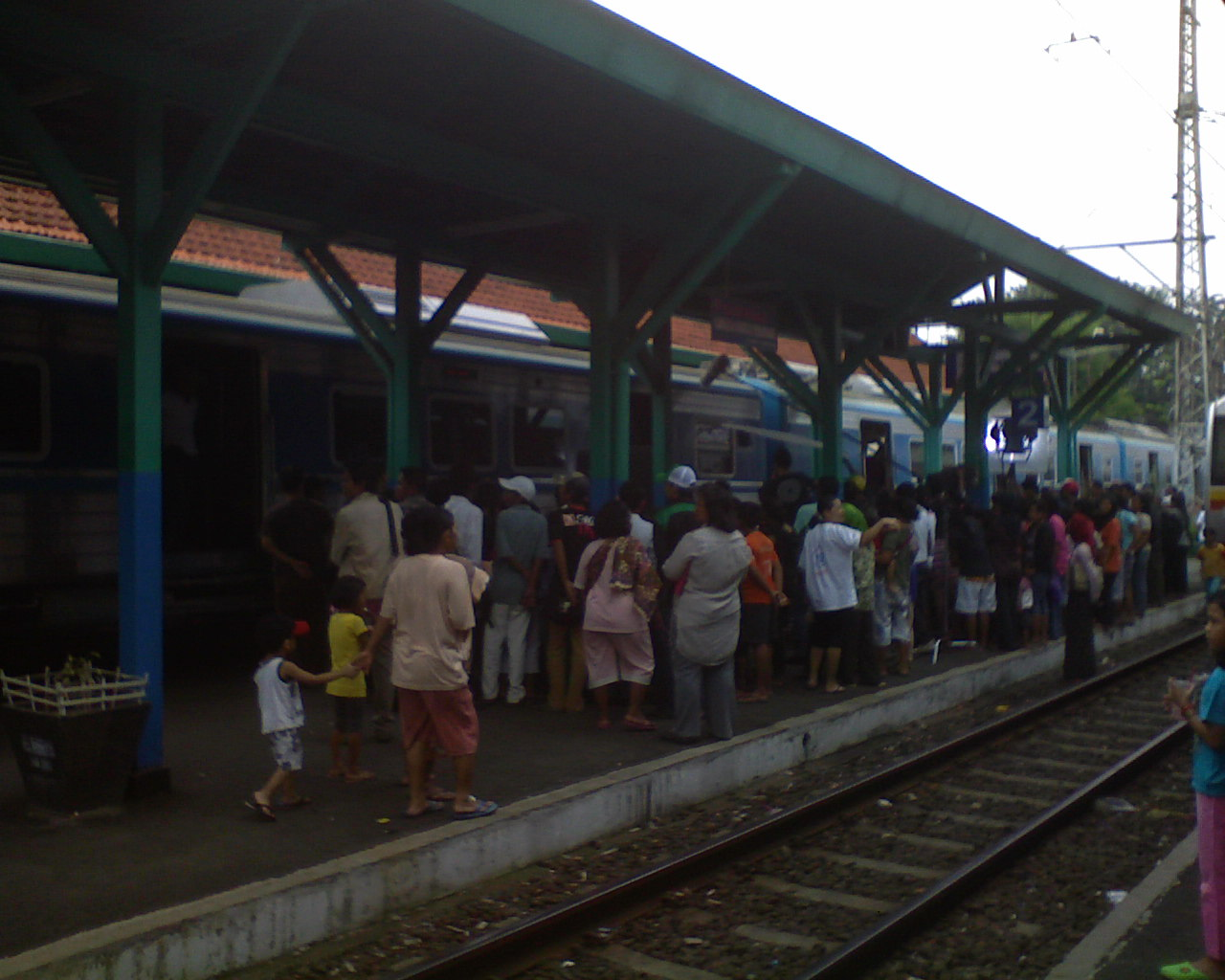
Manggarai Station platforms, 2009

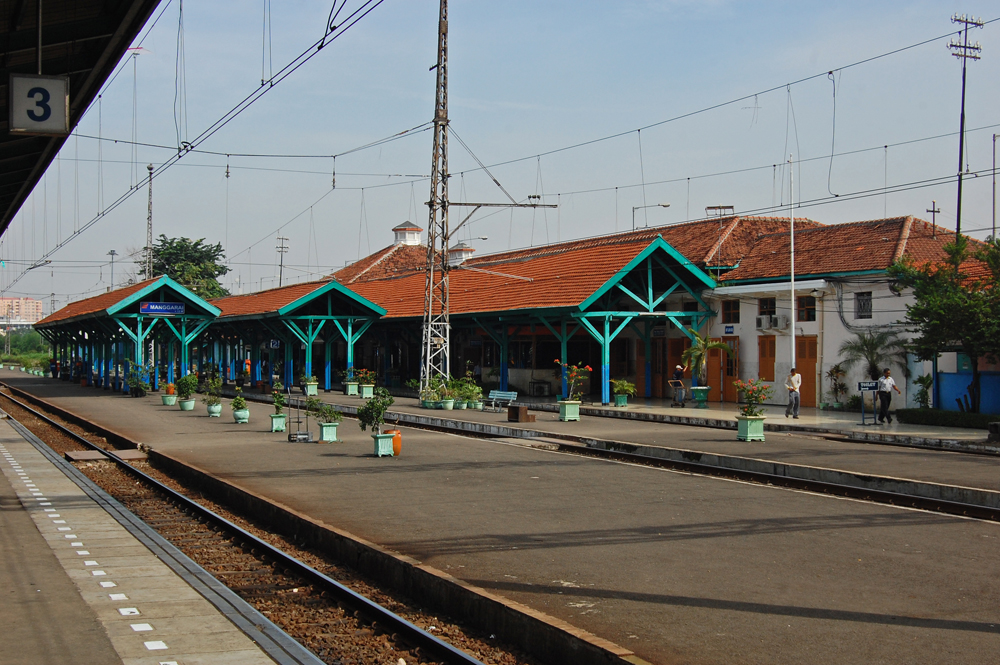
Manggarai Station platforms, 2010

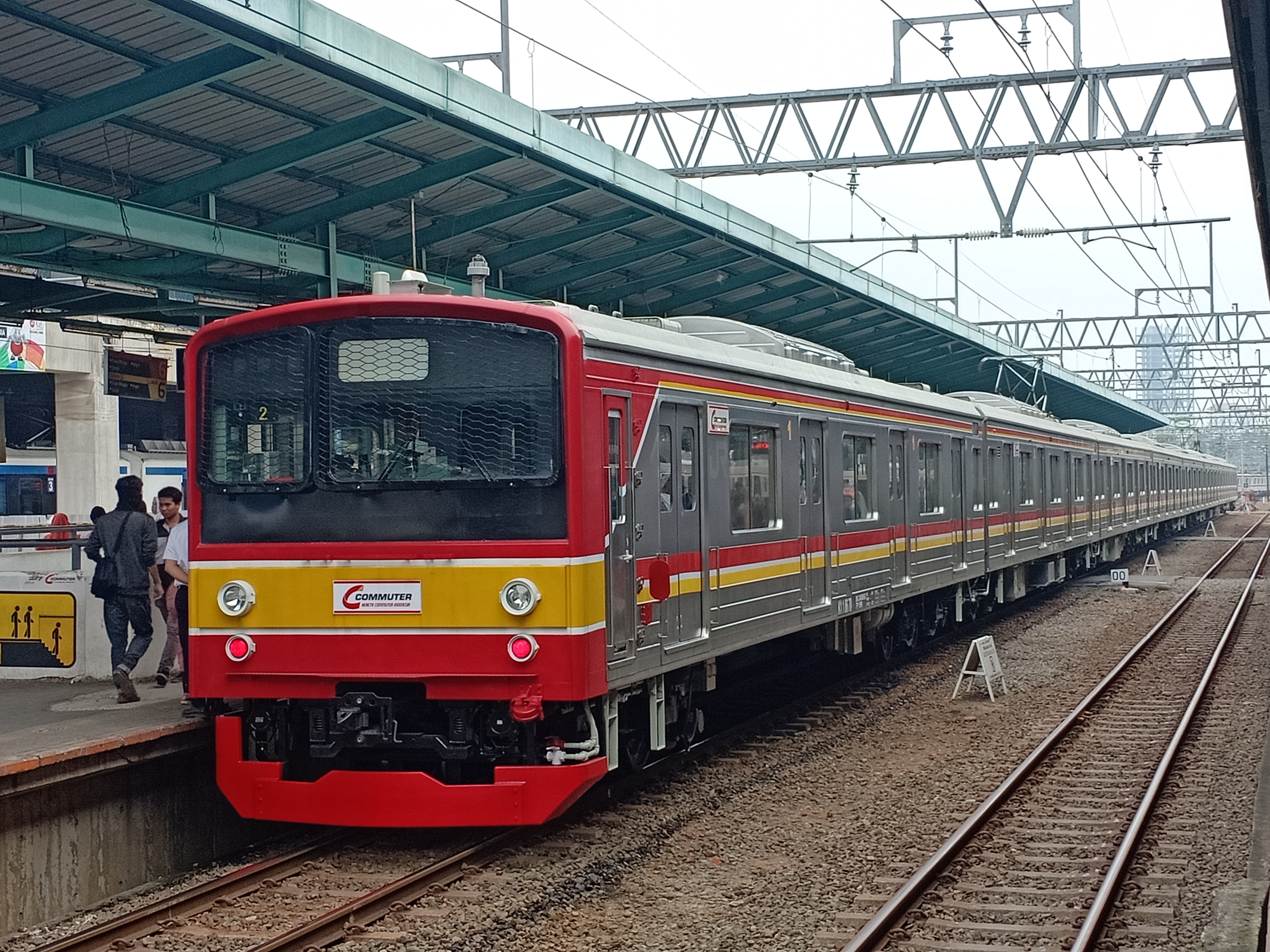
JR East series 205 ex Musashino line number 205-29F stops at Manggarai Station towards Jatinegara via Tanah Abang—Kampung Bandan—Kemayoran

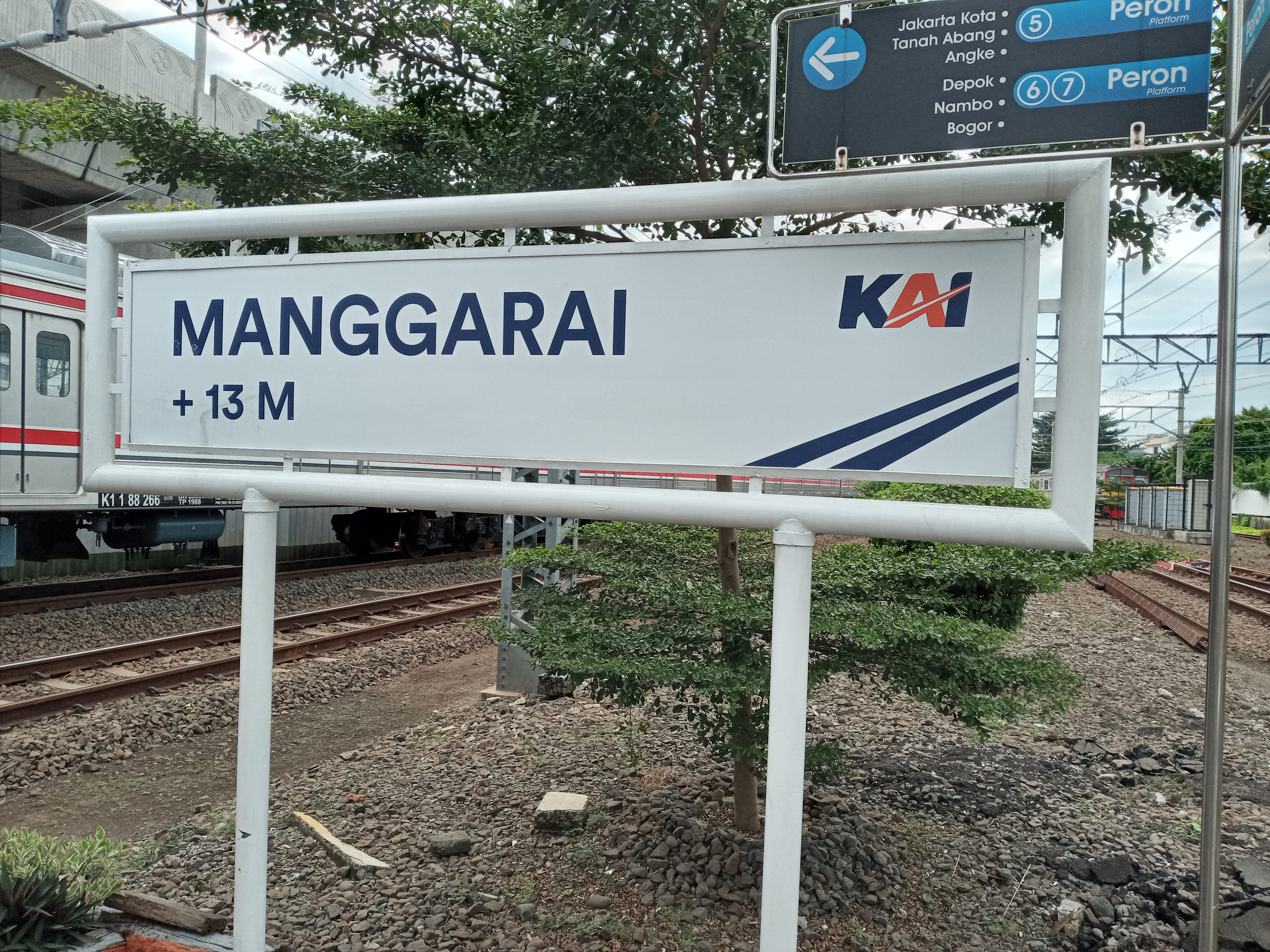
The station signboard as of April 2021

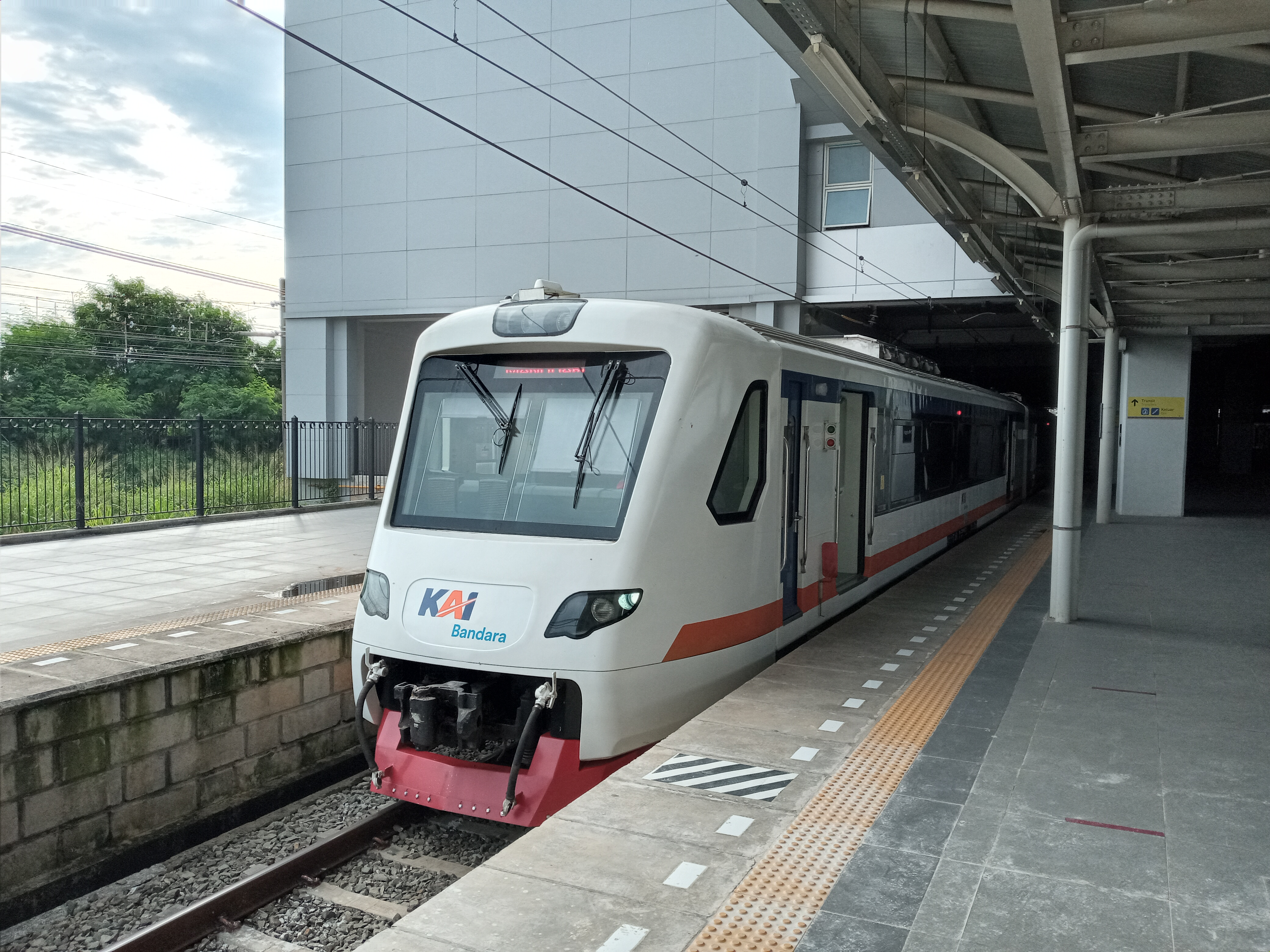
The EA203 series airport rail link train stopping at Manggarai Station heading to Soekarno-Hatta Airport Station via Duri-Batu Ceper, 2021

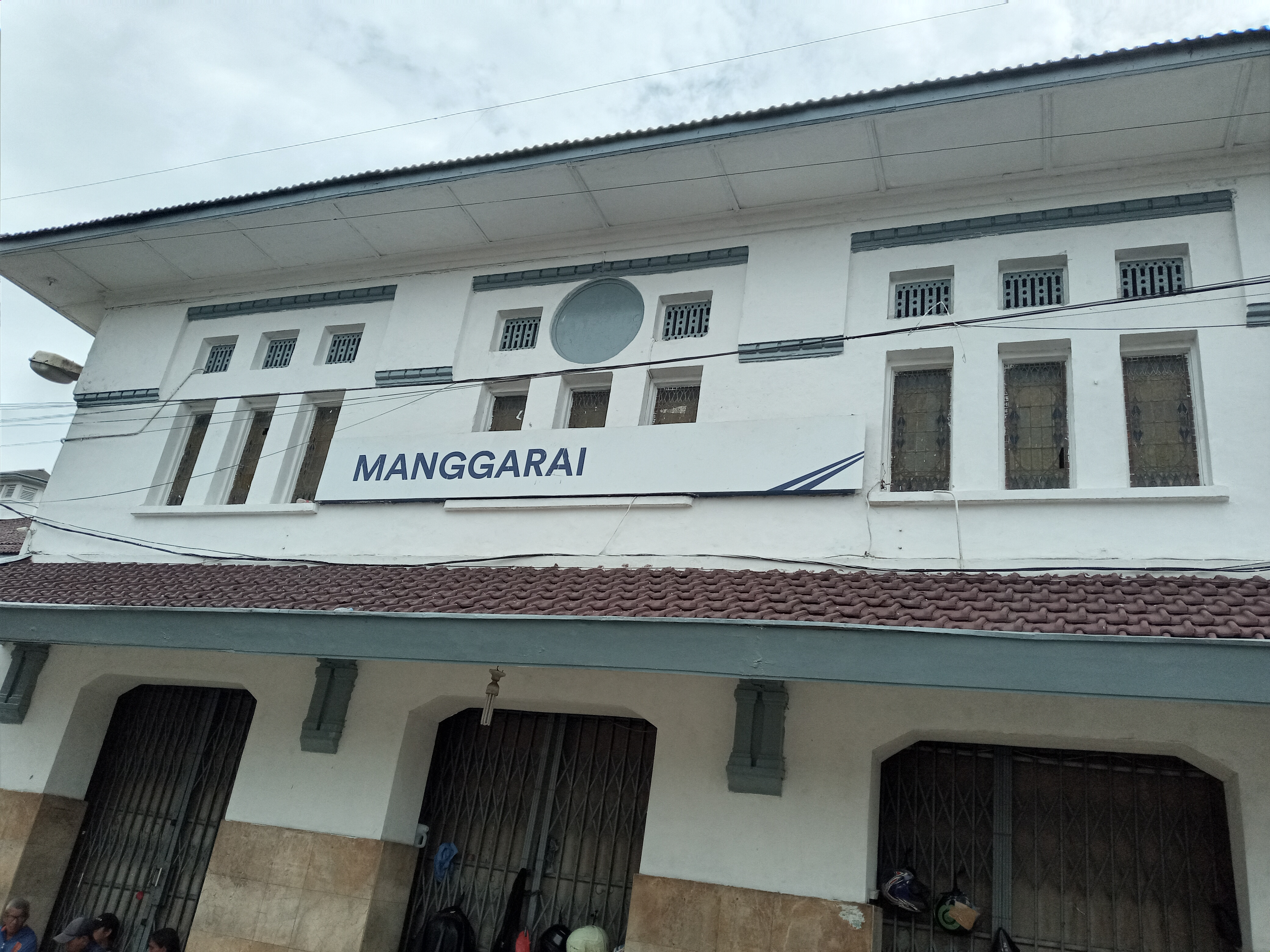
Manggarai Station old building with its name signage, 2021

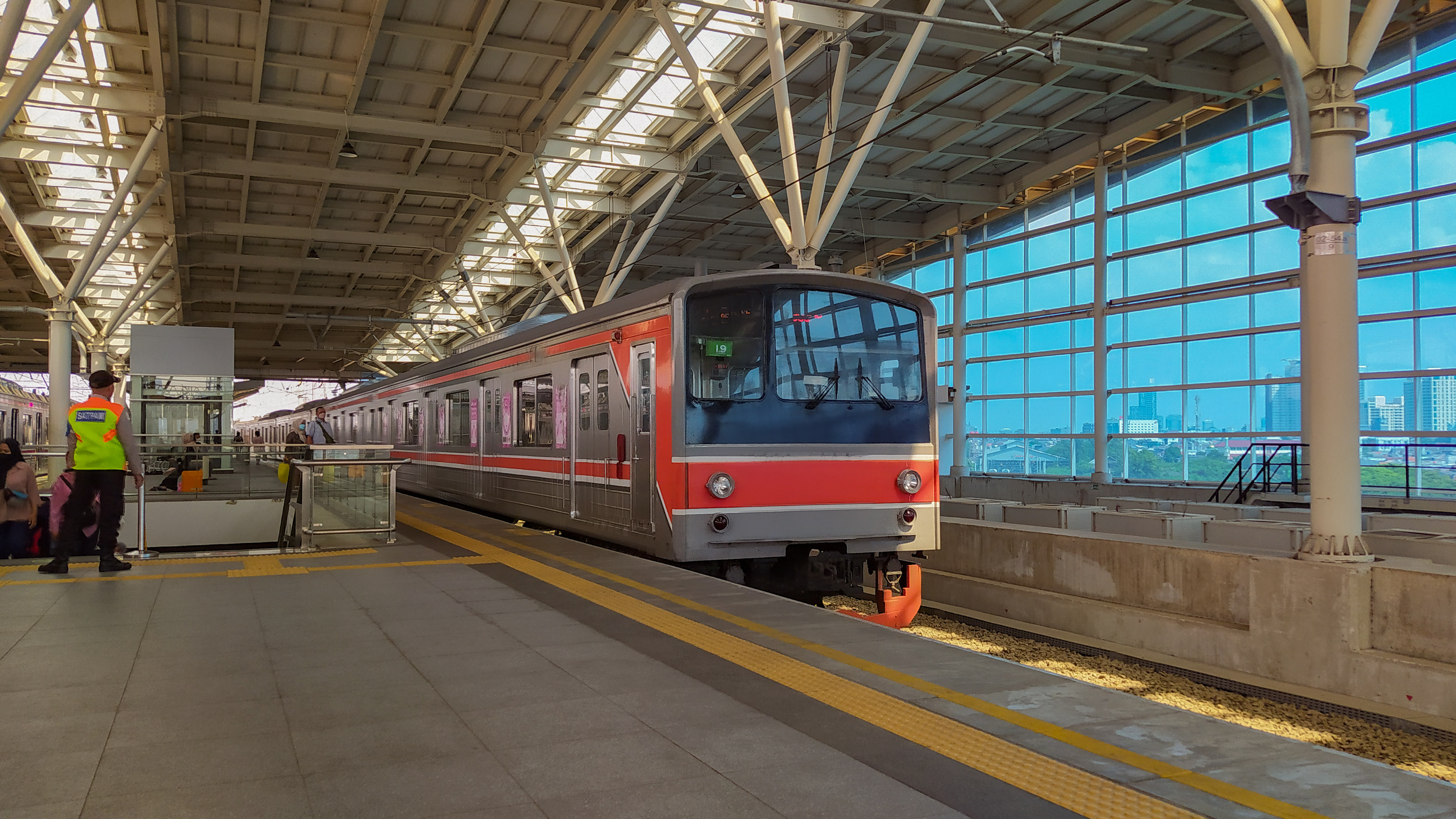
A commuter line train departing from the upper floor platform of Manggarai Station

== Notes ==
Preceding station	Kereta Api Indonesia	Following station
Terminus	Manggarai–Jatinegara	Matraman towards Jatinegara
~~Mampang~~ towards Tanah Abang	Tanah Abang–Manggarai	Terminus
Cikini towards Jakarta Kota	Jakarta Kota–Manggarai	Terminus
Terminus	Manggarai–Padalarang	Tebet towards Padalarang
