= Sawah Besar railway station =

Railway station in Indonesia

B04 Sawah Besar Station Stasiun Sawah Besar
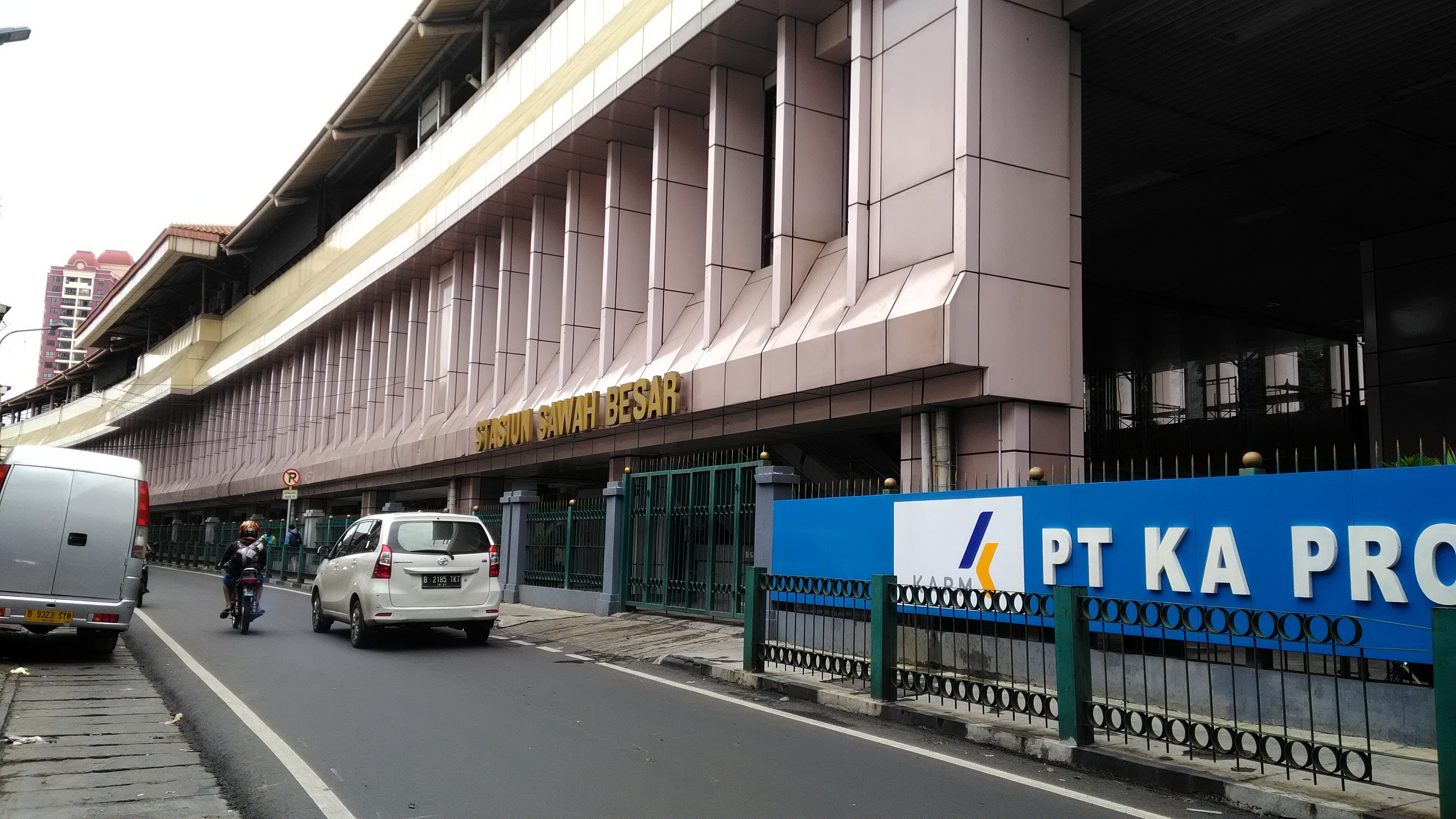
- Sawah Besar Station

General information
- Location: Jl. Kyai Haji Samanhudi, Sawah Besar, Central Jakarta; Jakarta; Indonesia
- Coordinates: 6.160667°S 106.827639°E
- Elevation: +15 m (49 ft)
- Owner: Kereta Api Indonesia
- Operator: KAI Commuter
- Line: Bogor Line
- Platforms: 2 (side platforms)
- Tracks: 2

Construction
- Structure type: Elevated
- Accessible: Available

Other information
- Station code: SW

History
- Opened: 15 September 1871 (NIS)
- Opening: 5 June 1992
- Electrified: 6 April 1925
- Former names: Sawah Besaar Station

Services
Preceding station		Following station
Mangga Besar towards Jakarta Kota	Commuter Line Bogor	Juanda towards Bogor or Nambo
Location
- Location within Jakarta

Sawah Besar Station (formerly Sawah Besaar Station) is a railway station, located on Jl. Kyai Haji Samanhudi. Altitude this station is 15 meters amsl, this station is one of seven elevated stations on Jakarta railway's Jakarta Kota–Manggarai segment, and is named after the Jakarta subdistrict with the same name. Pasar Baru market is within walking distance from this station.

== History ==
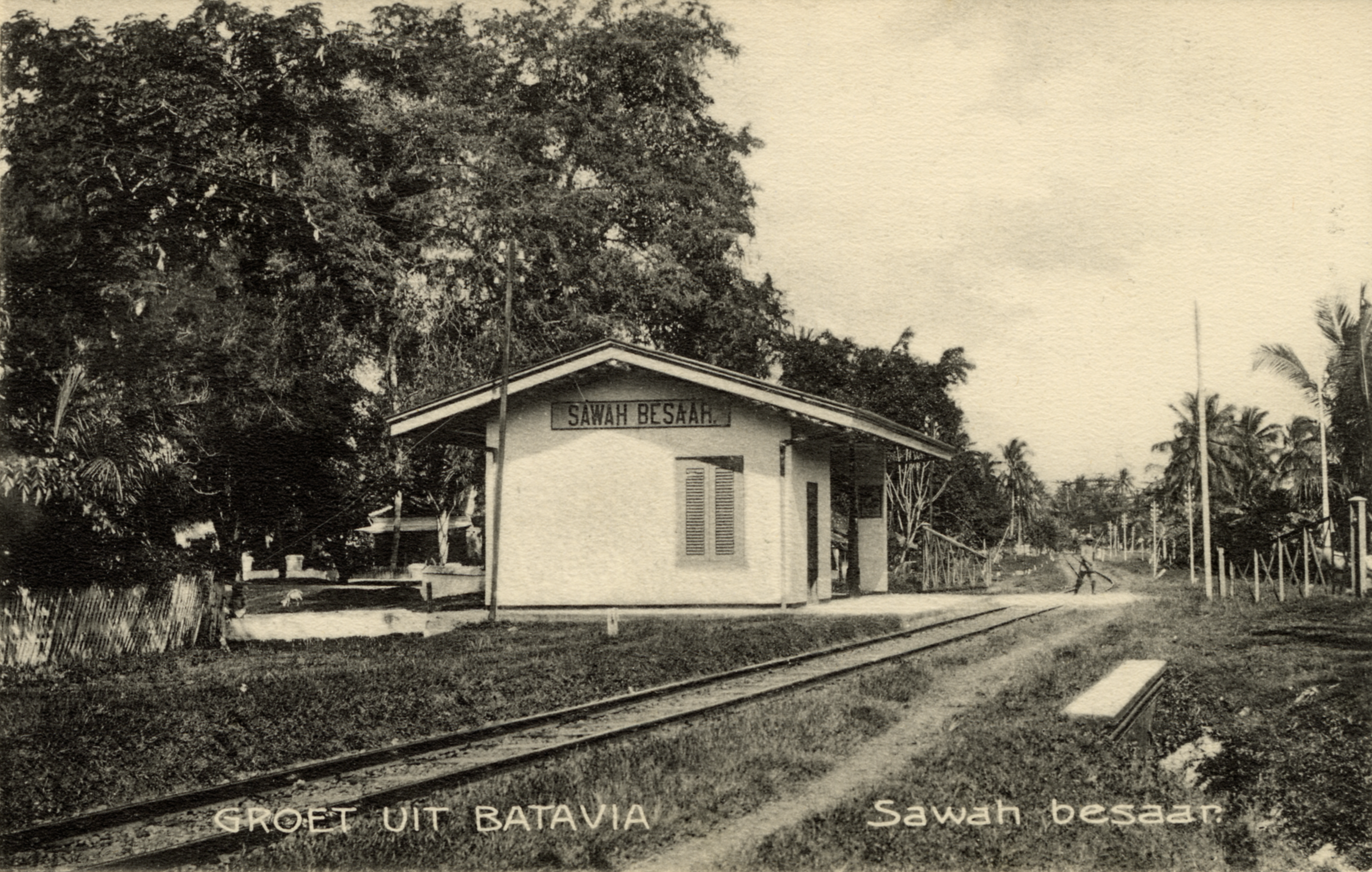
Sawah Besaar Station, unknown date.

Sawah Besar Station is one of the oldest railway stations in Batavia, located on the Batavia–Weltevreden section of the Batavia–Buitenzorg railway line which was inaugurated by the Nederlandsch-Indische Spoorweg Maatschappij (NIS) on 15 September 1871. Initially, this station was a simple train stop. which was named Sawah Besaar and changed its name to Sawah Besar in the late 1890s.

On 5 June 1992, President Suharto along with Mrs. Tien and staff in the government inaugurated the elevated track by riding the train from Gambir to Jakarta Kota station. The building of Sawah Besar Station is modern with touches of pink and white panels, which to this day are still preserved and have not been repainted. It is known, the project which was started in February 1988 spent Rp 432,5 billion and when it was inaugurated it was not completely finished until finally it could be fully operational a year later.

== Building and layout ==
The Sawah Besar Station building is modern with a touch of lilac colored panels which are still maintained to this day and have never been painted, only the pillars of the platform have now been painted pale pink. It is known that the project, which began in February 1988, spent Rp. 432.5 billion and was not fully completed when it was inaugurated, so that it was fully operational a year later.

This station has only two railway lines.

Platform floor	Side platform, the doors are opened on the right side	
Platform floor	Line 1	← (Mangga Besar) Bogor Line to Jakarta Kota
Platform floor	Line 2	Bogor Line to Bogor or Nambo (Juanda) →
Platform floor	Side platform, the doors are opened on the right side	

== Services ==
The following is a list of train services at the Sawah Besar Station.

=== Passenger services ===
- KAI Commuter
  - Bogor Line, to Jakarta Kota and Bogor
  - Bogor Line (Nambo branch), to Jakarta Kota and Nambo

== Supporting transportation ==
Type	Route	Destinatiom
Mikrotrans Jak Lingko	JAK-10	Jakarta Kota–Tanah Abang
Mikrolet	M12	Senen–Jakarta Kota
