= Cikini railway station =

Railway station in Indonesia

B08 Cikini Station Stasiun Cikini
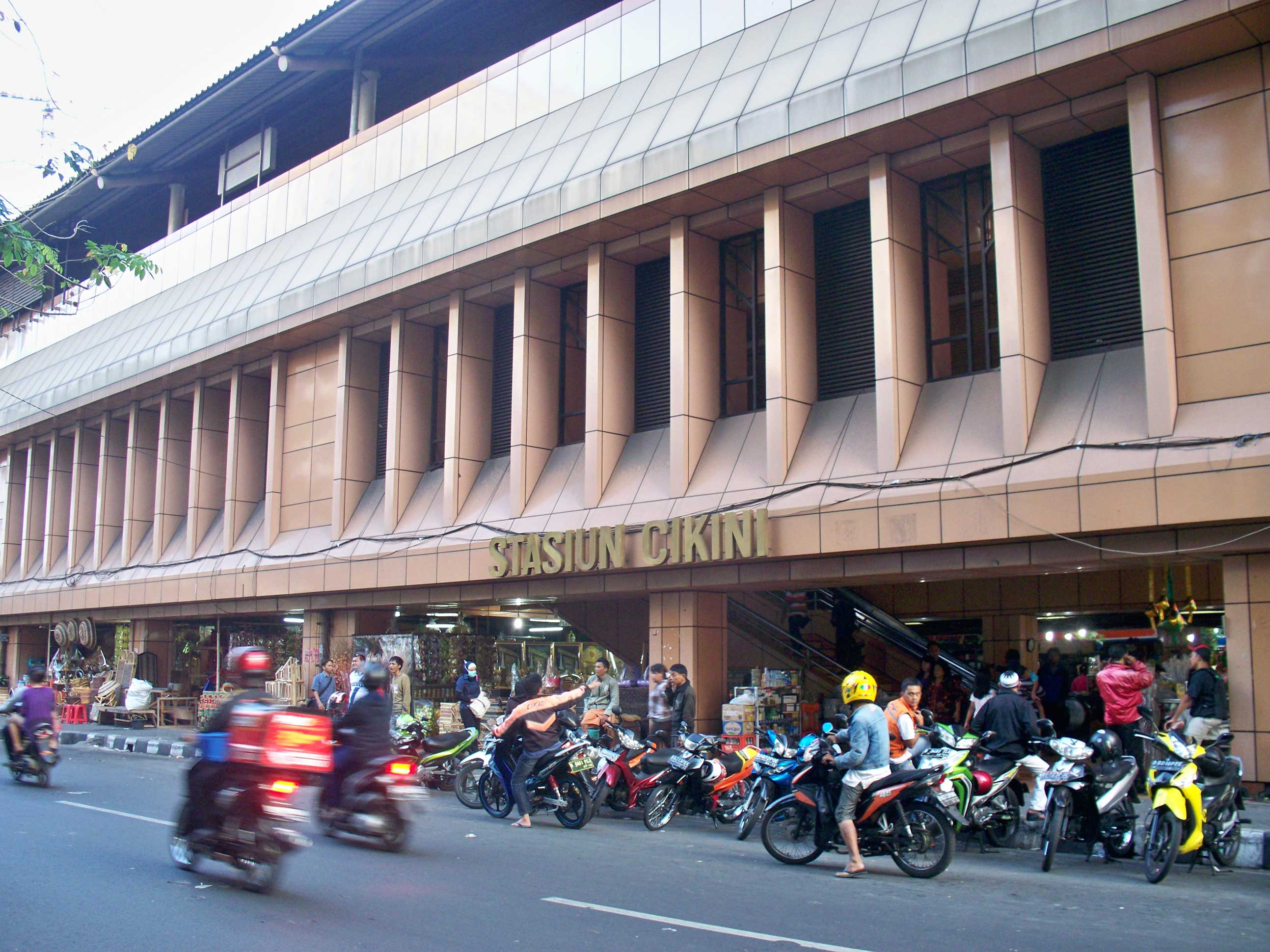
- Cikini Station

General information
- Location: Jl. Cikini Raya, Cikini, Menteng, Central Jakarta; Indonesia
- Coordinates: 6.1985°S 106.8413°E
- Elevation: +20 m (66 ft)
- Owner: Kereta Api Indonesia
- Operator: KAI Commuter
- Line: Bogor Line
- Platforms: 2 side platforms
- Tracks: 2

Construction
- Structure type: Elevated
- Parking: Available
- Accessible: Available

Other information
- Station code: CKI

History
- Opened: 1872
- Rebuilt: 1989

Services
Preceding station		Following station
Gondangdia towards Jakarta Kota	Commuter Line Bogor	Manggarai towards Bogor or Nambo
Location
- Location within Jakarta

Cikini Station is a railway station located on Jl. Cikini Raya, Cikini, Menteng, Jakarta. This station is only served by KRL Commuterline commuter trains from Jakarta Kota to Depok and Bogor.

== History ==
Cikini Station was originally a small railway stop which was built as a replacement for the Dierentuin railway stop. At that time, the Batavia City Council considered the location of the Dierentuin Stop to be bizarre and impractical for the development of the Gondangdia and Menteng areas. So that the Batavia City Council ordered the Staatsspoorwegen (SS) to build a new train stop as a replacement for the Dierentuin Stop. SS built 2 small bus stops located in Gondangdia and Menteng respectively. This railway stop was inaugurated in 1926 and was named Tjikini.

Until the late 1980s, to the south of this station, before Manggarai Station there used to be a train stop, namely Pegangsaan Stop which is located right on the north side of Jalan Diponegoro. The Pegangsaan railway stop was demolished in the late 1980s, when an elevated railroad was built between Manggarai and Jakarta Kota. From this railway stop, there was a branch line to Salemba Station.

Before the 1990s there was a railway track branching off to an opium factory located in Kramat and further on to the Rajawali–Jatinegara railway. After the factory closed in 1981, this side-track was dismantled.

Cikini Station, which is currently active, is an elevated railway station which is located in the southernmost part of the Jakarta Kota–Manggarai railway. On 5 June 1992, President Soeharto along with Mrs. Tien Soeharto and the ranks in the government inaugurated the elevated railway by taking the KRL from Gambir to Jakarta Kota Station.

Since 1 August 2019, this station, together with Sudirman, Palmerah, UI and Taman Kota Stations, has officially abolished the sale of single trip cards (Guaranteed Daily Tickets/THB) for KRL Commuter Lines. This is because the majority of KRL Commuter Line passengers are used to using multi-trip cards and electronic money. In this way, long queues to buy KRL tickets can be cut. However, service users can still tap-in/tap-out with THB cards at this station.

== Building and layout ==
The Cikini Station building is modern with a touch of brown panels which are still maintained to this day and have never been painted, only the platform pillars are now repainted to a beige color. It is known that the project, which began in February 1988, spent Rp. 432.5 billion and was not fully completed when it was inaugurated, so that it was fully operational a year later.

This station has only two railway lines. On the south side of this station there is a branch to the upper floor of the Manggarai Station, as part of the Manggarai Station renovation project.

Platform floor	Side platform, the doors are opened on the right side	
Platform floor	Line 1	← (Gondangdia) Bogor Line to Jakarta Kota
Platform floor	Line 2	Bogor Line to Bogor or Nambo (Manggarai) →
Platform floor	Side platform, the doors are opened on the right side	

== Services ==
The following is a list of train services at the Cikini Station.

=== Passenger services ===
- KAI Commuter
  - Bogor Line, to Jakarta Kota and Bogor
  - Bogor Line (Nambo branch), to Jakarta Kota and Nambo

== Supporting transportation ==
Type	Route	Destination
TransJakarta city bus	4A (non-BRT)	TU Gas–Jelambar
TransJakarta city bus	5A (non-BRT)	Kampung Melayu–Jelambar
TransJakarta city bus	5M (MetroTrans)	Kampung Melayu–Tanah Abang Station (via RP Soeroso–Medan Merdeka Selatan)
TransJakarta city bus	6H (non-BRT)	Pasar Senen–Lebak Bulus (via Cikini Raya–Pegangsaan Timur)
Mikrotrans Jak Lingko	JAK-10A	Cikini Station–Gondangdia Station (via Salemba Raya)
Mikrotrans Jak Lingko	JAK-10B	Cikini Station–Gondangdia Station (via Kramat Raya)

== Incidents ==
- On 31 August 2009 at 08:00 WIB, a man was stung by an electric cable while boarding the KRL 513 carriage from Bogor. As a result of this incident, the electricity between Manggarai–Gambir had to be turned off in order to evacuate the victim. This incident caused several KRL trips to be disrupted.

== See also ==
- Rail transport in Indonesia
