= Mangga Besar railway station =

Railway station in Indonesia

B03 Mangga Besar Station Stasiun Mangga Besar
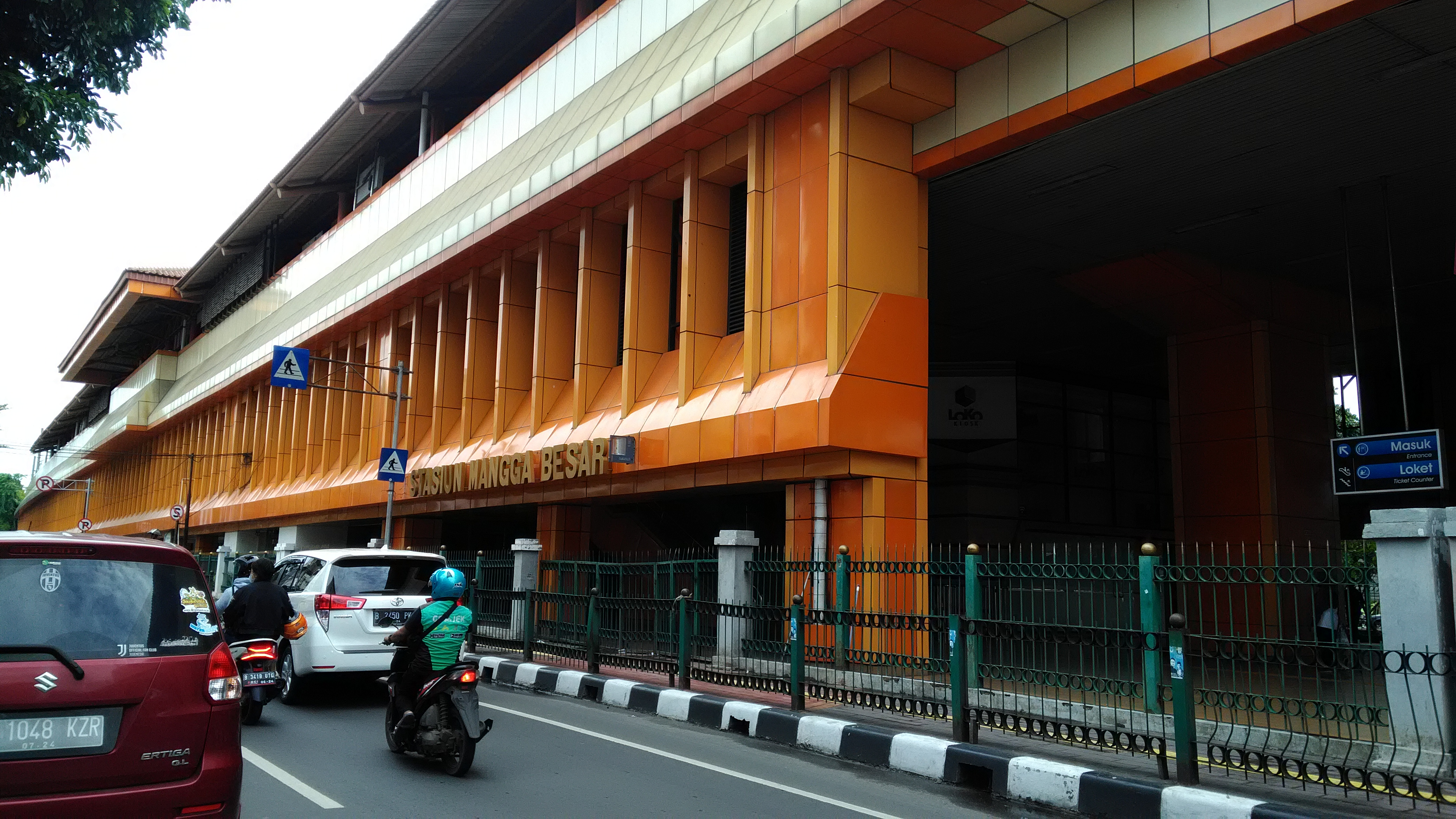
- Mangga Besar Station

General information
- Location: Jl. Mangga Besar Raya, Karang Anyar, Sawah Besar, Central Jakarta; Jakarta; Indonesia
- Coordinates: 6.1496813°S 106.8270263°E
- Elevation: +14 m (46 ft)
- Owner: Kereta Api Indonesia
- Operator: KAI Commuter
- Line: Bogor line
- Platforms: 2 (side platforms)
- Tracks: 2

Construction
- Structure type: Elevated
- Accessible: Available

Other information
- Station code: MGB
- Fare zone: 1

History
- Opened: 1992

Services
Preceding station		Following station
Jayakarta towards Jakarta Kota	Commuter Line Bogor	Sawah Besar towards Bogor or Nambo
Location
- Location within Jakarta

Mangga Besar Station (MGB) is a railway station serving by KRL Commuterline system. It's located at Jl. Mangga Besar Raya. It is the named after the major artery road that lies adjacent to the station with the same name, and is also part of the rail system's "Zone 1".

Mangga Besar Station is a new station built as an elevated station in the Manggarai-Jakarta Kota segment. On June 5, 1992, President Soeharto along with Mrs. Tien Soeharto inaugurated the elevated railway by taking the KRL from Gambir to Jakarta Kota Station.

== Building and layout ==
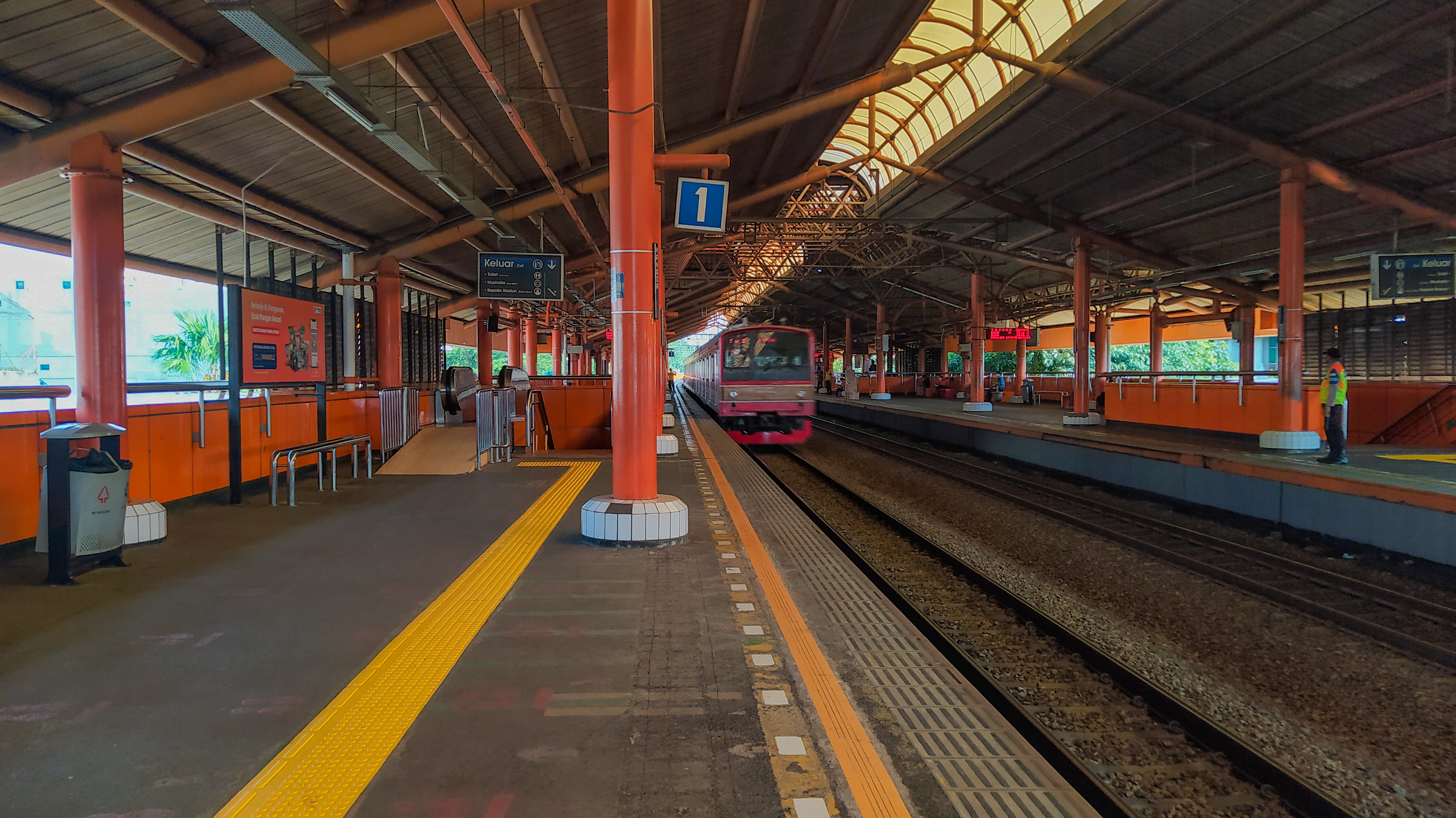
The platform of the station

The Mangga Besar Station building is modern with a touch of orange panels which are still maintained to this day and have never been painted. It is known that the project, which began in February 1988, spent Rp. 432.5 billion and at the time it was inaugurated was not fully completed until it was fully operational a year later.

Mangga Besar Station has two railway lines, both of them are straight tracks.

Platform floor	Side platform, the doors are opened on the right side	
Platform floor	Line 1	← (Jayakarta) Bogor Line to Jakarta Kota
Platform floor	Line 2	Bogor Line to Bogor (Sawah Besar) →
Platform floor	Side platform, the doors are opened on the right side	

== Services ==
The following is a list of train services at the Mangga Besar Station.

=== Passenger services ===
- KAI Commuter
  - Bogor Line, to Jakarta Kota and Bogor
  - Bogor Line (Nambo branch), to Jakarta Kota and Nambo

== Supporting transportation ==
Type	Route	Destinatiom
Mikrotrans Jak Lingko	JAK-10	Jakarta Kota–Tanah Abang
Mikrolet	JP01	Jakarta Kota–Pasar Baru
