= Jayakarta railway station =

Railway station in Indonesia

B02 Jayakarta Station Stasiun Jayakarta
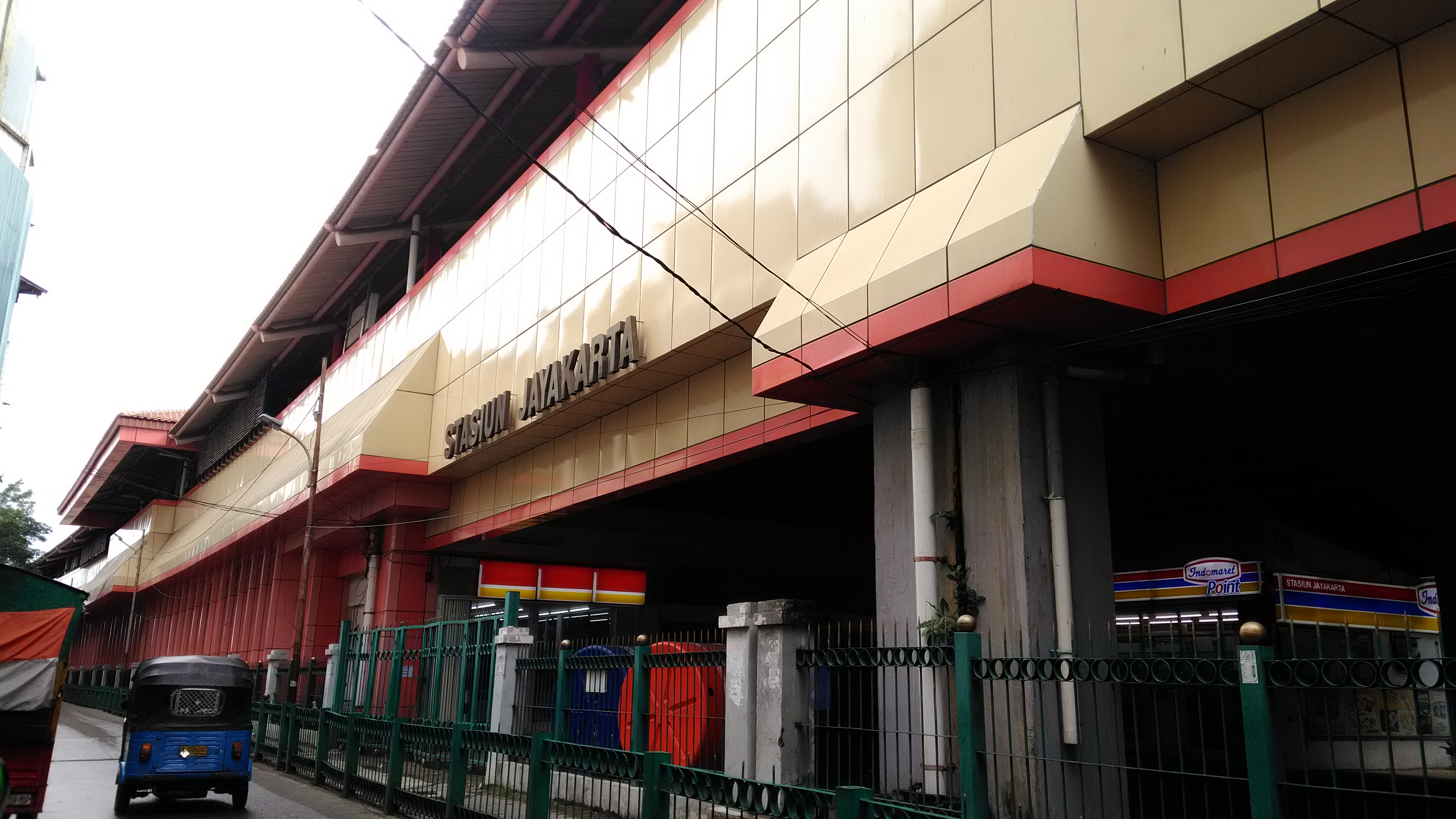
- Jayakarta Station

General information
- Location: Jl. Pangeran Jayakarta, Mangga Dua Selatan, Sawah Besar, Central Jakarta; Jakarta; Indonesia
- Coordinates: 6.141285°S 106.823133°E
- Elevation: +13 m (43 ft)
- Owner: Kereta Api Indonesia
- Operator: KAI Commuter
- Line: Bogor Line
- Platforms: 2 (side platforms)
- Tracks: 2

Construction
- Structure type: Elevated
- Accessible: Available

Other information
- Station code: JAY

History
- Opened: 1992

Services
Preceding station		Following station
Jakarta Kota Terminus	Commuter Line Bogor	Mangga Besar towards Bogor or Nambo
Location
- Location within Jakarta

Jayakarta Station (JAY) is a railway station serving by KRL Commuterline system. It is located at Jl. Pangeran Jayakarta. It is the named after a Banten prince with the same name.

This station is one of the new stations on the Manggarai-Jakarta Kota railway when it was converted an elevated train line. When the Manggarai-Jakarta Kota cross line was still below (at-grade with ground level), this station did not yet exist.

== History ==
In February 1988, the Manggarai–Jakarta Kota elevated railway project was held which cost Rp. 432.5 billion, this project also included the construction of new train stations on this line including Jayakarta Station.

On June 5, 1992, President Soeharto along with Mrs. Tien Soeharto and other government officials inaugurated this elevated train line by taking the executive class Rheostatic electric multiple unit (KRL) from Gambir Station to Jakarta Kota Station. At the time it was inaugurated, the construction of the elevated railway line had not been fully completed, until it was finally fully operational a year later.

== Building and layout ==
The Jayakarta Station building is in a modern style, with a touch of fanta pink panels which are still maintained to this day and have never been painted, only the platform poles have been changed to crimson.

Unlike other stations on the Jakarta Kota–Manggarai elevated railway which has three floors, this station only has two floors. The reason is that this elevated train line will descend and tread to the ground and end at Jakarta Kota Station.

In this station area there is also one remnant of the old railroad bridge left over from the Manggarai–Jakarta Kota route when it was still on the ground; the remains of this railroad bridge have now changed its function to become a road for residents. Previously, there were two bridges here because the Manggarai–Jakarta Kota route was a double track. However, the other bridge has been dismantled because the land will be used for the construction of the station's elevated platform foundation and only one bridge remains.

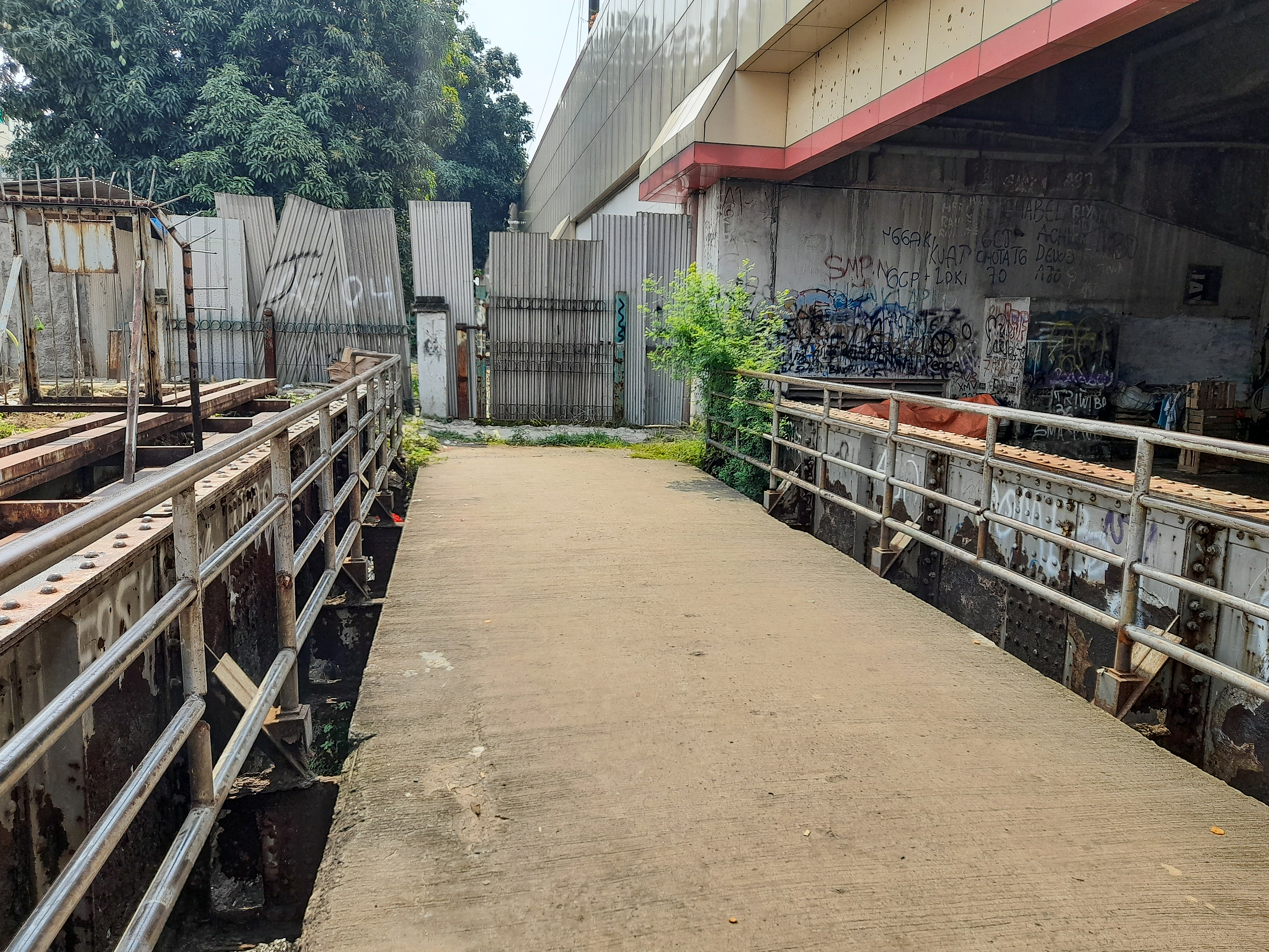
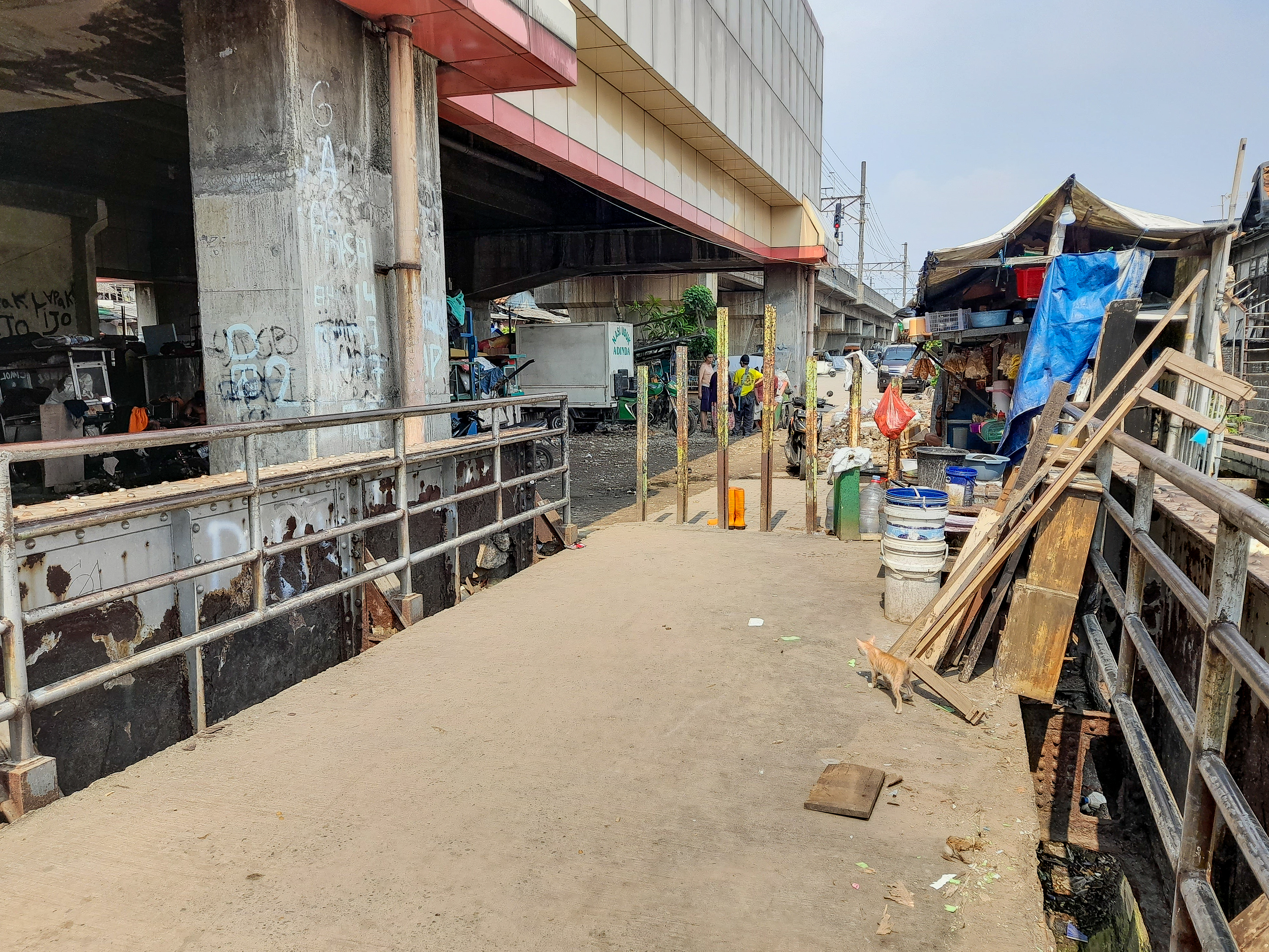
The original bridge of the Jakarta Kota–Manggarai railway towards Jakarta Kota (above) and Mangga Besar (below) before it was moved into an elevated lane in 1992

Jayakarta Station has two lines. In 2019–2020, a new crossing point was installed which is located about 50–70 meters to the south from Jayakarta Station, as well as an overhead line modification for the line on the station's railroad switch.

Jayakarta railway station layout
Platform floor	Side platform, the doors are opened on the right side	
Platform floor	Line 1	← (Jakarta Kota) Bogor Line to Jakarta Kota
Platform floor	Line 2	Bogor Line to Bogor or Nambo (Mangga Besar) →
Platform floor	Side platform, the doors are opened on the right side	

== Services ==
The following is a list of train services at the Jayakarta Station.

=== Passenger services ===
- KAI Commuter
  - Bogor Line, to Jakarta Kota and Bogor
  - Bogor Line (Nambo branch), to Jakarta Kota and Nambo

== Supporting transportation ==
Type	Route	Destination
TransJakarta city bus	12K (Asemka Explorer)	Jakarta Kota Station (via Pangeran Jayakarta)
Mikrotrans Jak Lingko	JAK-10	Jakarta Kota–Tanah Abang
Mikrotrans Jak Lingko	JAK-120	Muara Angke–Jakarta International Stadium
