= Juanda railway station =

Railway station in Jakarta, Indonesia

B05 Juanda Station Stasiun Juanda
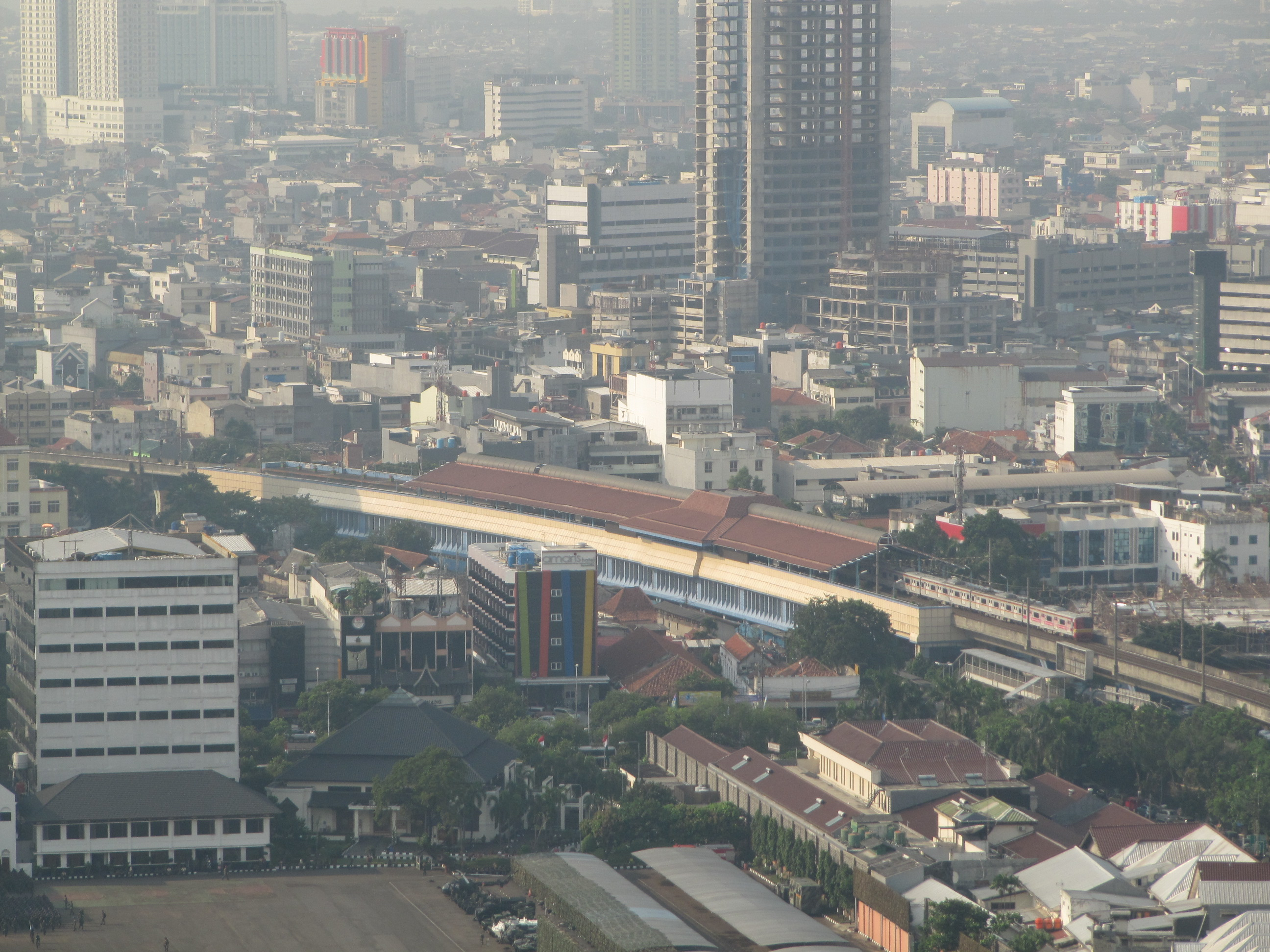
- Juanda Station

General information
- Location: Jl. Ir. H. Juanda No. 1, Kebon Kelapa, Gambir, Central Jakarta; Jakarta; Indonesia
- Coordinates: 6.1667216°S 106.830473°E
- Elevation: +15 m (49 ft)
- Owner: Kereta Api Indonesia
- Operator: KAI Commuter
- Line: Bogor Line
- Platforms: 2 side platforms
- Tracks: 2
- Connections: Juanda

Construction
- Structure type: Elevated
- Accessible: Available

Other information
- Station code: JUA
- Classification: II

History
- Opened: 15 September 1871
- Rebuilt: 1992
- Former names: Noordwijk Station; Pintu Air Station

Services
Preceding station		Following station
Sawah Besar towards Jakarta Kota	Bogor Commuter Line	Gondangdia towards Bogor or Nambo
Location
- Location within Jakarta

Juanda Station (Indonesian: Stasiun Juanda, station code: JUA) is a railway station located in Kebon Kelapa, Gambir, Central Jakarta, Jakarta, Indonesia. Since Gambir station stopped serving Commuterline trains, Juanda, along, with Gondangdia station, has become the alternative for passengers going to Merdeka Square and surrounding areas. It is located near the Istiqlal Mosque.

The station gets its name from the nearby road, which in turn is named after Djuanda Kartawidjaja, the 11th and final Prime Minister of Indonesia.

KAI Commuter, a subsidiary of Kereta Api Indonesia and the Commuterline operator, has their headquarters in the station's northern side.

== History ==
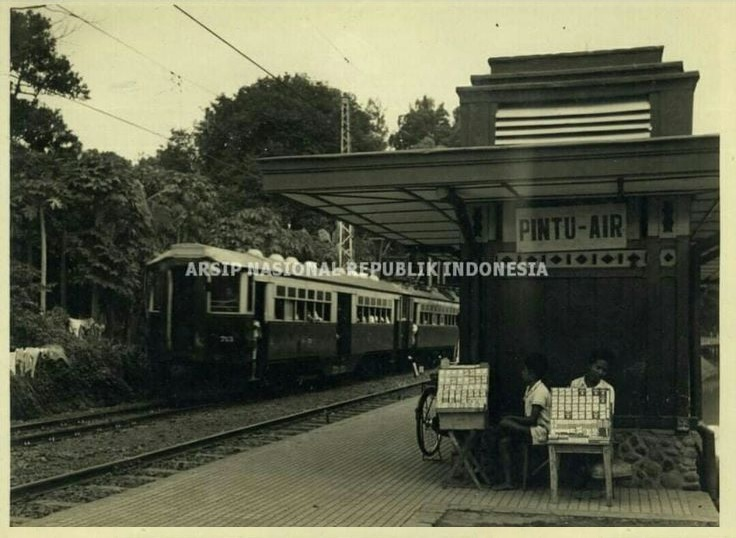
A street vendor at the Pintu Air station in 1951

This station is a train station located on the first section of the Batavia–Buitenzorg railway line which was inaugurated by the Nederlandsch-Indische Spoorweg Maatschappij (NIS), namely the Batavia–Weltevreden section. At first, this station was a small stop which was inaugurated on 15 September 1871, simultaneously with the opening of the first section of the railroad line. This station was named Noordwijk Station which later changed its name to Pintoe-air Station (Pintu Air Station after the enactment of the Republican Spelling System) during the Japanese occupation of Indonesia.

In the 1990s, Pintu Air Station was massively reconstructed into an elevated station. The remodeled station was inaugurated as one of the Manggarai–Jakarta Kota elevated stations on 5 June 1992, along with a name change to Juanda Station. At the time, President Suharto along with his wife Siti Hartinah and other ranks in the government inaugurated the elevated railway by taking the electric train from Gambir Station to Jakarta Kota Station.

== Building and layout ==
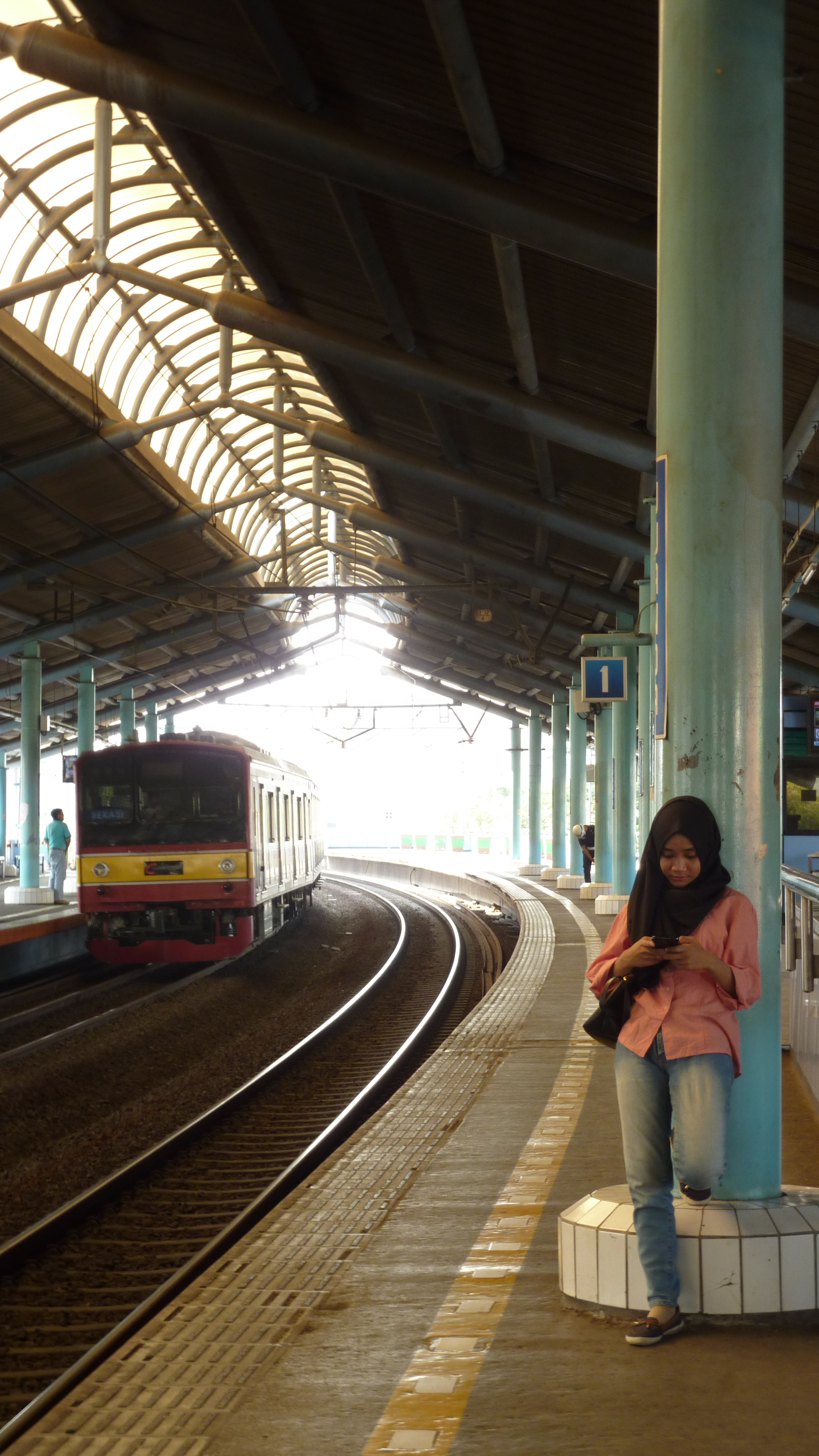
A passenger waiting at the station platform

Like other Manggarai–Jakarta Kota elevated stations, work on the station was done by Inti Era Cipta, a consortium formed by Encona Engineering, Wiratman, PT Chandra Wahana Raya and PT Asianenco. The project also involved 3 Japanese firms: Pacific Consultant International, Japan Transportation Consultants, and Japan Electrical Consulting.

Manggarai–Jakarta Kota elevated stations were designed with post-modernism, incorporating hi-tech aesthetics with local traditional architecture. Stations were designed with bright colors to serve as local landmarks for the area, and also for easy recognition. Juanda station has an azure blue enamel metal sheet finish, to prevent the building from vandalism and fires.

Originally, the first floor of the station was open-air, before being closed off for more retail space. Its known that the project, which began in February 1988 and completed by 1992, costed 432.5 billion rupiah. It wasn't completed by its inauguration date, it was fully operational a year after.

This station has two railway lines.

B05
Platform floor	Side platform, the doors are opened on the right side	
Platform floor	Line 1	← (Sawah Besar) Bogor Line to Jakarta Kota
Platform floor	Line 2	Bogor Line to Bogor or Nambo (Gondangdia) →
Platform floor	Side platform, the doors are opened on the right side	

== Services ==
The following is a list of train services at the Juanda Station.

=== Passenger services ===
- KAI Commuter
  - Bogor Line, to Jakarta Kota and Bogor
  - Bogor Line (Nambo branch), to Jakarta Kota and Nambo

== Supporting transportation ==
Juanda station is connected to the Juanda Transjakarta BRT station and the Istiqlal Mosque by a pedestrian bridge.

Type	Station	Route	Destination
Transjakarta BRT	Juanda	List of Transjakarta corridors#Corridor 2	Pulo Gadung–Monumen Nasional
Transjakarta BRT	Juanda	List of Transjakarta corridors#Cross-corridor routes	PGC–Juanda
Transjakarta BRT	Juanda	Transjakarta Corridor 7	Kampung Rambutan–Juanda via Cempaka Putih
Transjakarta BRT	Juanda	List of TransJakarta corridors#Corridor 8	Lebak Bulus–Pasar Baru
Transjakarta BRT	Juanda	Transjakarta Corridor 10	Tanjung Priok–Bundaran Senayan
Transjakarta city bus	Juanda	14A (non-BRT)	Monumen Nasional–Jakarta International Stadium
Transjakarta cross-border feeder (Transjabodetabek)	Juanda	T12	Poris Plawad bus terminal–Juanda (via Cengkareng–Kunciran Toll Road)
Mikrotrans Jak Lingko	N/A	JAK-10	Jakarta Kota–Tanah Abang
Perum DAMRI	N/A	x2	Jakarta Fair–Poris Plawad bus terminal (via Grogol)
JR Connexion (Perum DAMRI)	N/A	x7	Bogor Station–Juanda Station
JR Connexion (Perum DAMRI)	N/A	x8	Tamansari Persada–Juanda Station
JR Connexion (Perum DAMRI)	N/A	x14	BSD Intermodal Terminal–ITC Mangga Dua
JR Connexion (Perum DAMRI)	N/A	x15	Sentul City–Juanda Station
JR Connexion (Perum DAMRI)	N/A	x16	Sawangan, Depok–Juanda Station

== Incidents ==
- On 26 October 2008, at 15.30 WIB, the pantograph which was located in Car 1 of the Commuter Rail Jakarta Kota-Bogor route was caught on fire. As a result of this incident, a number of Commuter Train trips were hampered. There were no casualties in this incident.
- On 11 September 2009, there was a power outage at Juanda Station, causing a number of Commuter Train trips to be disrupted for 15–20 minutes.
- On 3 October 2009, at 09.50 WIB, the Jakarta Kota-Bogor Economy class EMU was rammed by a locomotive at Juanda Station. This incident did not result in delays in train travel, but a 10-year-old homeless girl suffered a fracture of her right leg.
- On 23 September 2015, at 15.25 WIB, the 2015 Juanda Train Tragedy occurred which involved two JR 205 EMUs at Juanda Station. Both front train driver's cabins were badly damaged. Forty-two people were injured as a result of the accident. This incident resulted in the EMU 1156 driver, Gustian, being seriously injured and rushed to the Gatot Soebroto Army Central Hospital, Central Jakarta.
