= Jakarta–Bogor railway =

Railway line in Indonesia

Jakarta-Bogor railway

Overview
- Native name: Jalur kereta api Jakarta–Bogor
- Status: Operational
- Owner: DJKA
- Locale: Indonesia
- Termini: Jakarta Kota; Bogor
- Stations: 33

Service
- Operator: Kereta Api Indonesia

History
- Opened: 1871-1873

Technical
- Line length: 15 km (9.3 mi)
- Track length: 54.81 km (34.06 mi)
- Num of tracks: 2
- Character: Elevated
- Track gauge: 3 ft 6 in (1,067 mm)
- Electrification: 1,500 V DC overhead line

The Jakarta–Bogor railway (Indonesian: Jalur kereta api Jakarta–Bogor), is 54.81 km long railway line that connects Jakarta Kota with Bogor. This railway is one of the main line in Jakarta Greater Area.

== History ==
Between 1871 and 1873, the Dutch railway company Nederlandsch-Indische Spoorweg Maatschappij built the railway as part of the line to Bogor. Originally there were two northern termini, each on a separate rail branch: one next to the former city hall at "Station Batavia Noord", and the other at "Kleine Boom" on the east side of the Sunda Kelapa harbor near current day Pasar Ikan. "Kleine Boom" was the location of a customs office, and therefore this terminus was primarily meant for foreign boat passengers.

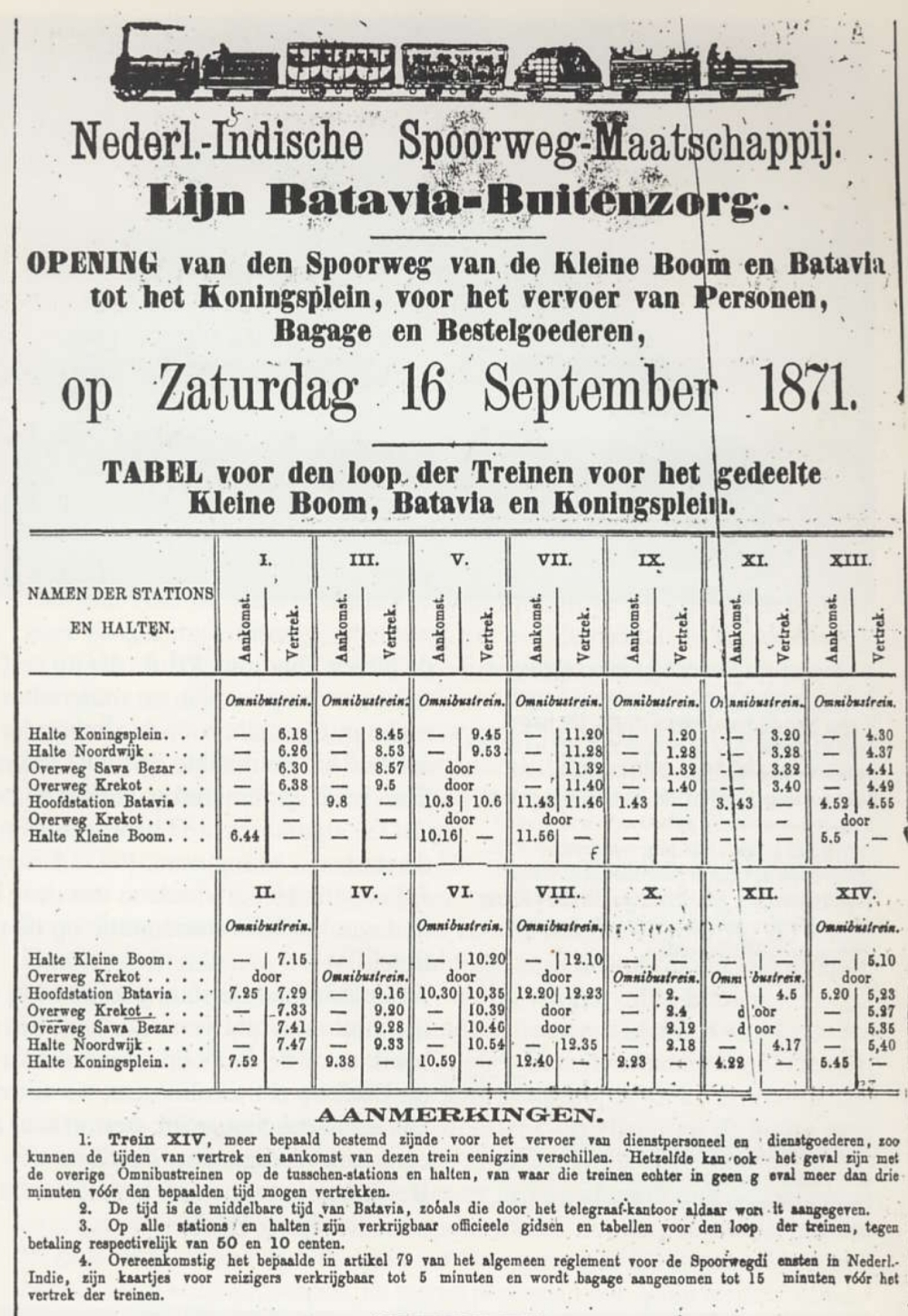
The first train timetable in 16 September 1871. cited from De Javabode.

Initially built as a standard gauge (which at the time was referred to as 1067 mm gauge) and single-track railway, the line gained a second track and was electrified in the early 1920s in a project to improve the entire Batavian railway network. There had been plans to elevate the line between Sawah Besar and Manggarai, but this was cancelled due to the depression of 1920-21.

Between 1988 and 1992, the so far ground-level railway was reconstructed into an elevated railway after all, aimed at providing grade separation to avoid level crossing accidents with other traffic. The elevated stations were each colored differently, hence the "rainbow line" nickname.

== Trains ==
Both intercity and local trains use the Jakarta Kota-Manggarai line. Intercity trains will typically only serve Gambir Station, while local commuter trains call at every station. The following is a list of scheduled trains on this route:

=== Intercity trains ===
- Argo Bromo Anggrek to Surabaya Pasar Turi, East Java
- Argo Dwipangga to Solo Balapan, Central Java
- Argo Cheribon to Cirebon, West Java and Tegal, Central Java
- Argo Lawu to Solo Balapan, Central Java
- Argo Muria to Semarang Tawang, Central Java
- Argo Parahyangan to Bandung,[West Java
- Argo Sindoro to Semarang Tawang, Central Java
- Bangunkarta to Jombang, East Java
- Bima and Argo Semeru to Surabaya Gubeng, East Java
- Gajayana to Malang, East Java
- Purwojaya to Cilacap, Central Java
- Sembrani to Surabaya Pasar Turi, East Java
- Taksaka to Yogyakarta, Yogyakarta

=== KRL Jabodetabek commuter trains ===
- Bogor Line: Jakarta Kota-Depok(-Bogor)

== See also ==
- PT Kereta Api
