= Nederlandsch-Indische Spoorweg Maatschappij =

Railway company in Java, Dutch East Indies

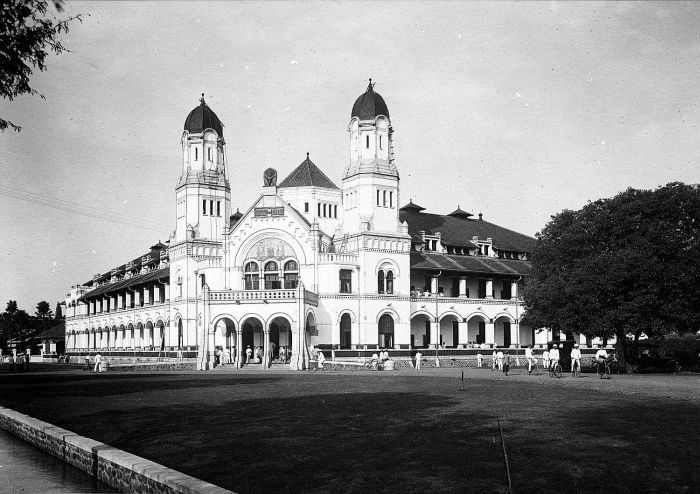
- NIS company head office in Semarang, Dutch East Indies, now known as Lawang Sewu

Overview
- Headquarters: The Hague, Netherlands; Registered office Administration Office of the NIS, Semarang, Dutch East Indies; Corporate headquarters
- Locale: Batavia, Buitenzorg, Central Java, East Java, and Vorstenlanden, Dutch East Indies
- Dates of operation: August 27, 1863–1942
- Successor: Kereta Api Indonesia

Technical
- Track gauge: 1,435 mm (4 ft 8 1/2 in) standard gauge 1,067 mm (3 ft 6 in)

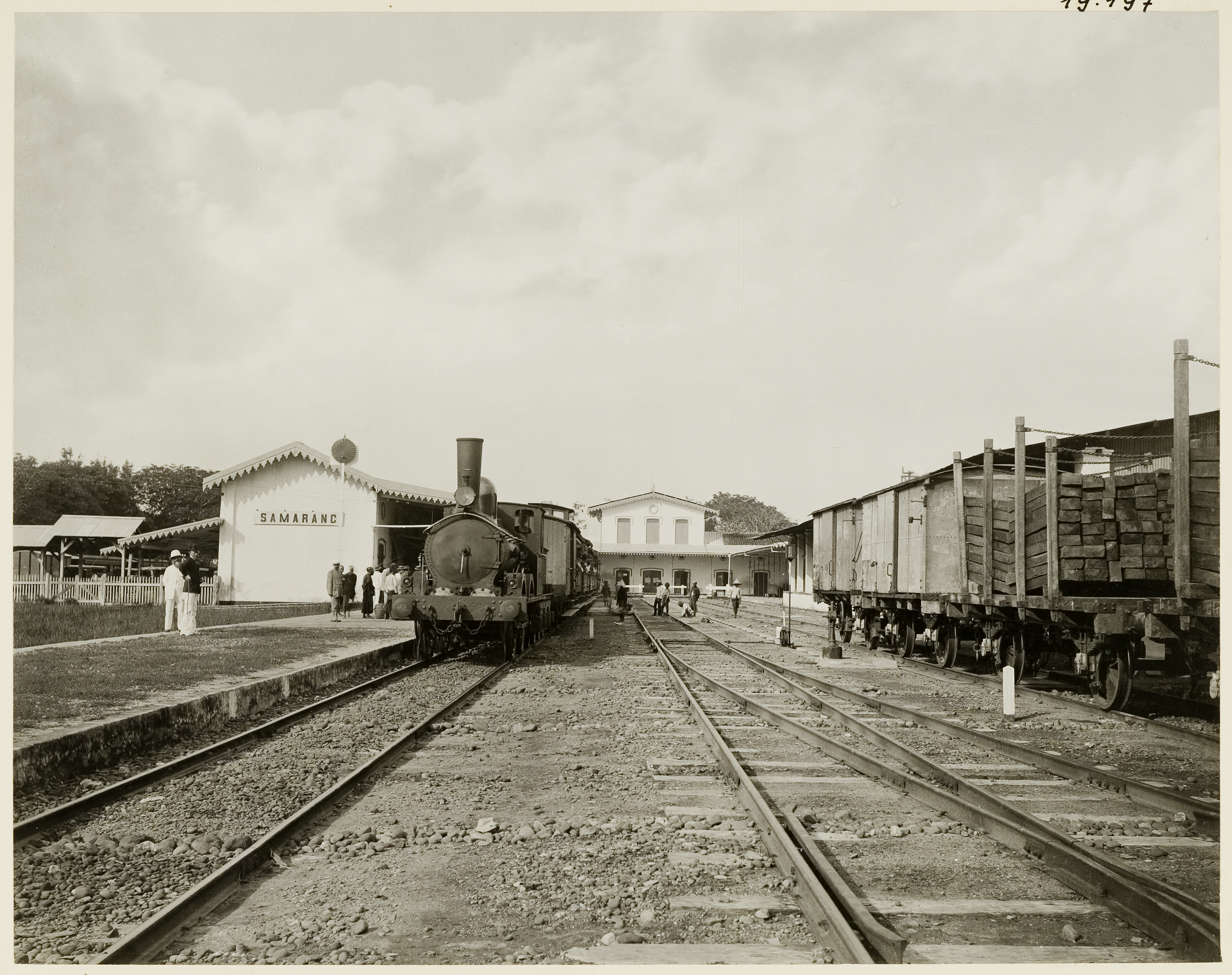
Samarang as the first station in Dutch East Indies (Indonesia) operated by NIS, also showed by its track which used standard gauge

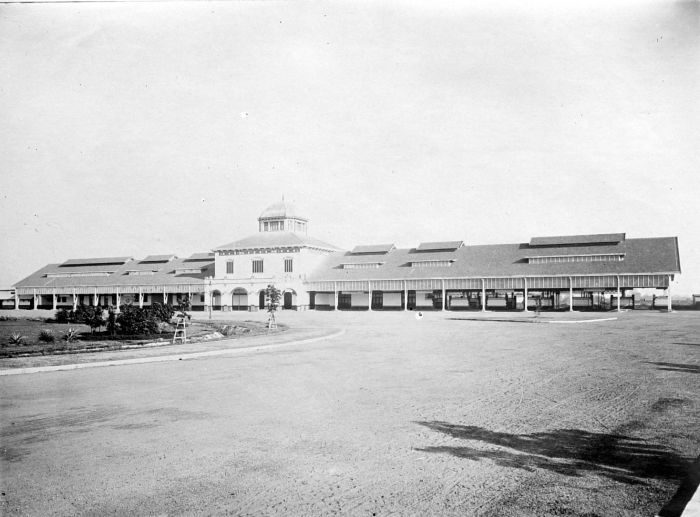
Samarang Tawang as a new operational NIS station, taken between 1910 and 1920

N.V. Nederlandsch-Indische Spoorweg Maatschappij (lit. 'Dutch East Indies Railway Company plc'), abbreviated to NIS, NISM or N.V. NISM was a private-owned railways company in charge of rail transport in Java, Dutch East Indies. The company's headquarters were in Semarang, Central Java. The company started its maiden route from Semarang (at Kemidjen village) to the Vorstenlanden (Yogyakarta and Surakarta) and in 1873 they also built their line to the Willem I Railway Station of Ambarawa–Kedungjati and Batavia–Buitenzorg lines. It was absorbed into the present Kereta Api Indonesia after Indonesian independence in 1949. It was the main competitor to Staatsspoorwegen as state-owned railway company and established on April 6, 1875.

The company's registered office is in The Hague (in the building now used by the South African embassy in the Netherlands), but it mainly operates from an administrative headquarters building in Semarang (now become Lawang Sewu in Javanese or The Thousand Doors) which was designed by Cosman Citroen and was renovated in 2009.

== History ==
In 1842, after a railway system had been successfully implemented in the Netherlands in 1837, the Dutch States General repeatedly urged the Dutch government to build a railroad network in their colony of Dutch East Indies. It was not until in 1864 that the colonial government, under the command of L. A. J. W. Baron Sloet van de Beele, built the first railway line in Java. This company was established on August 27, 1863: the concession was granted to W. Poolman, Alex Frazer and E.H. Kol, the founders of the company, to build the line from Samarang to Yogyakarta.

Construction started on Friday, June 17, 1864, from Kemidjen village, Samarang. They named the station Samarang or Samarang NIS as the starting point of the line to Tangoeng (Tanggung) via Allas-Toewa (Alastua) and Broemboeng (Brumbung) which was also among the oldest stations on a distance of around 25 km (16 miles) and was opened on August 10, 1867, and inaugurated for public service in 1873. In 1914, Samarang station was closed due to the frequent tidal floods and land subsidence which disrupted train operations. Starting from June 1, 1914, they moved to Samarang Tawang as their main operational station. The former Samarang station now is located at Kampung Spoorlan, Kemijen while the former building is buried as deep as 2 meters (6.6 ft) between densely populated houses. At the same time, they also built the head office in Samarang, now Lawang Sewu, which was completed in 1907. At the start of their operation, the company had no profitable business prospects, so they submitted proposals to the colonial government for additional funding for the 166 km (103 miles) line to Yogyakarta (Lempuyangan) via Surakarta (Balapan). Financial assistance and dividend guarantees were provided on condition that a 111 km (69 miles) booster line had to be built to Ambarawa to provide a rail connection from Kedungjati to the strategic military stronghold named Fort Willem I. They named it Willem I station and after Indonesian independence it changed its name to Ambarawa station. This station finally closed in 1977 and became Ambaa Railway Museum). By 1870, 109 km (68 miles) of the line had been built, and by 1917, a total of 206 km (128 miles) km had been operated in 1,435 mm (4 ft 8 1/2 in) standard gauge. With a branch line, the total track length is 419 km (260 miles).

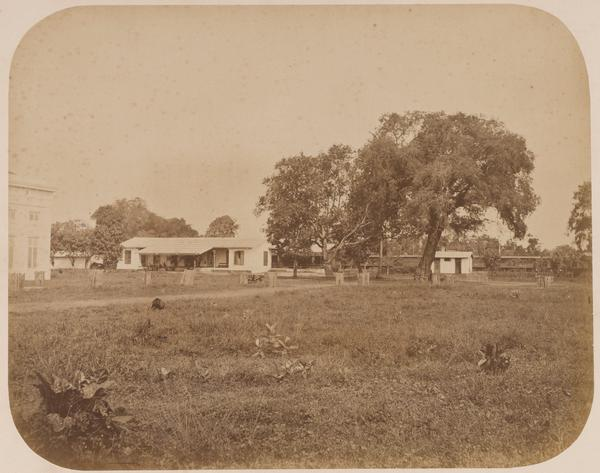
Batavia NIS station which was built in 1871. Located just southeast of Jakarta History Museum before it was closed in 1929 by Staatsspoorwegen (SS).

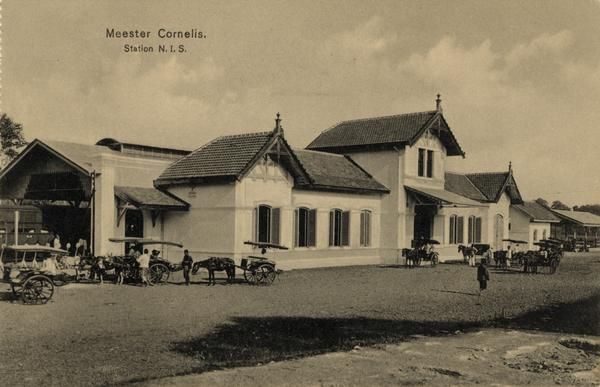
Meester Cornelis NIS ca. 1910, before it was closed by SS in 1918. It was located to the south of Manggarai and now become Bukit Duri KRL's depot.

The first narrow gauge, 1,067 mm (3 ft 6 in), of NIS railway line stretched from the governor's office in Buitenzorg (now Bogor) to the capital city of Batavia (Batavia Noord or Batavia NIS) for 25 km (16 miles) and had branches to Meester Cornelis (just south of Manggarai) around 1 km (0.62 miles) and Kleine Boom (Pasar Ikan near Sunda Kelapa) for around 2 km (1.2 miles). After a two-year construction period, the line opened on January 31, 1873, and quickly proved profitable. The short town line to Kleine Boom was abandoned in 1891, because it had no connection to the rest of the NIS rail network and the port activities had been transferred to Tanjung Priok, and the line itself was removed in 1897. On 1 November 1913, the Batavia NIS station was sold to Staatsspoorwegen (SS, "State Railways") along with the Buitenzorg–Batavia line and it was closed in 1929 after Batavia-Benedenstad (Jakarta Kota) had been built. By the end of 1918, the NIS had 57 locomotives, 35 passenger cars, 136 baggage cars and 1,393 freight cars. There were almost 23,000 train movements, with a total distance of around 1.23 million km. In 1917, nearly 4 million passengers were carried, of whom 3.99 million passengers were in class 3. By 1928, the NIS had carried 13.8 million passengers.

By 1936, the second-class network had been extended to a length of 602 km (374 miles), while the second mainline, 1,067 mm (3 ft 6 in), had a total length of 863 km (536 miles). The company received compensation for the Staatsspoorwegen (SS) rail transit between Batavia and Surabaya. The board of directors (Raad van Beheer) was based in Den Haag (The Hague), while the Committee van Bestuur (management committee) managed business in the colony. At the end of 1937, there were 37 employees in the senior service, 274 employees in the middle service and 3,557 employees in the regular service.

The first maintenance workshop was in Semarang and around 1915, it was moved to Yogyakarta (it is now Pengok Workshops or Balai Yasa Pengok). There is also a small workshop in Cepu.

During World War II, the Beijnes diesel-electric train car order had to be cancelled. Likewise, the high-performance steam locomotives ordered from Werkspoor could not be delivered after the German occupation in June 1940. For strategic reasons, the Solo-Gundih line was given a third rail to allow narrow gauge, 1,067 mm (3 ft 6 in), locomotives to operate from Semarang to Solo via Gambringan. Many of the NIS Class 380 locomotives, later designated as the C52 series, were taken to other areas by the Japanese. Although the locomotives were returned after the war, they fell into disrepair due to a regauging of the track to cape gauge size.

== Gallery ==
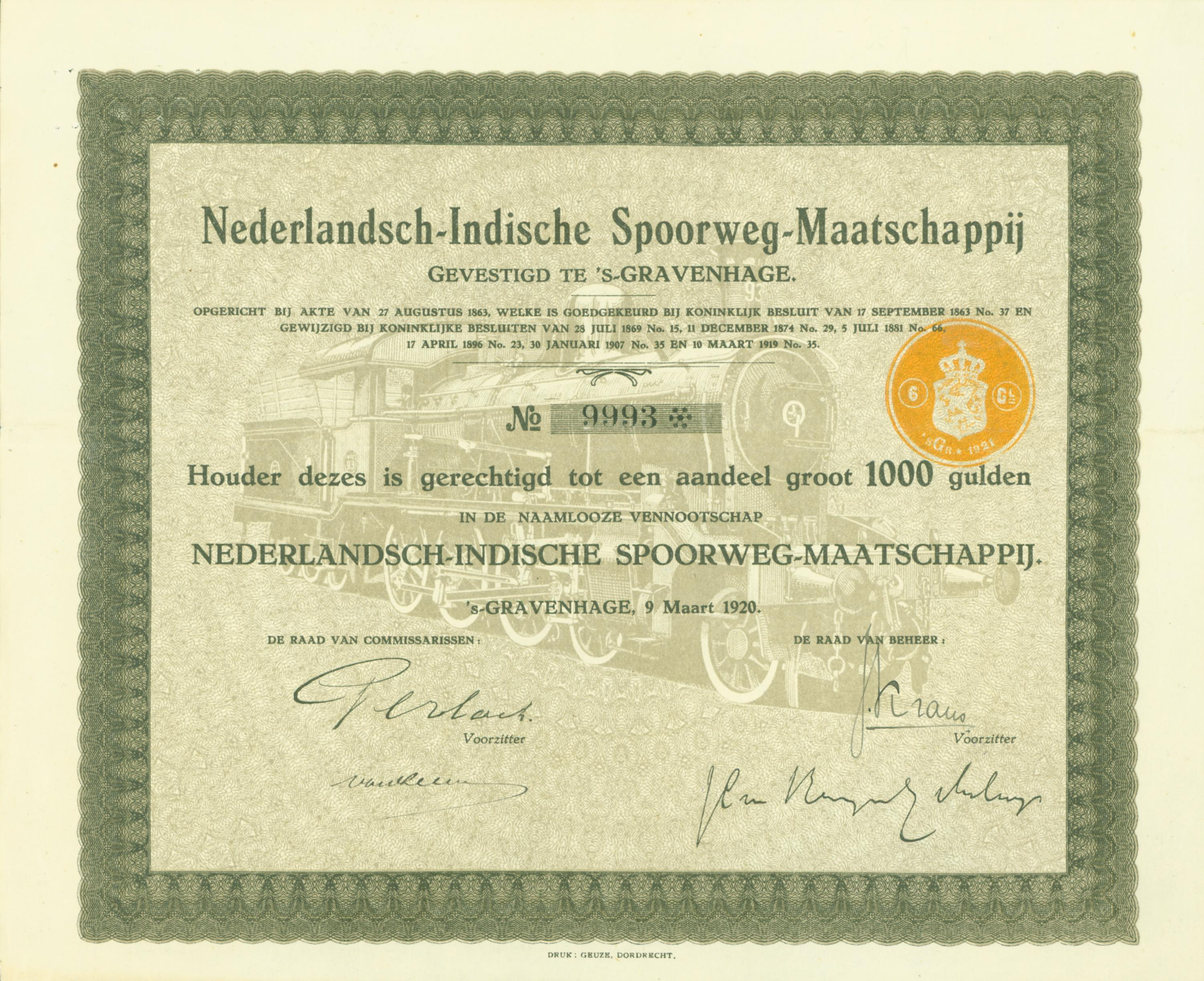
Share of the Nederlandsch-Indische Spoorweg-Maatschappij, issued 9 March 1920

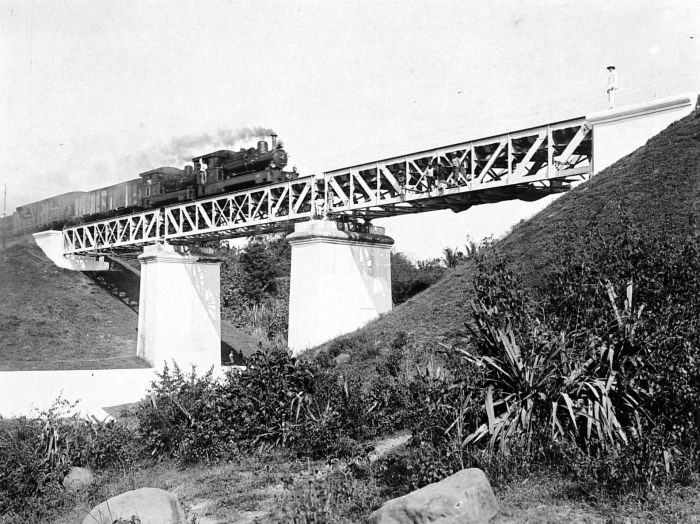
A NIS 3XX (now known as C 20 XX) with NS 2XX (now known as C 16 XX) crosses a railway bridge over the Code River (pronounced: [tʃo:ɖe]) in Yogyakarta on the line between Semarang to the "Vorstenlanden" or Royal Lands of the Surakarta Sunanate and the Sultanate of Jogjakarta

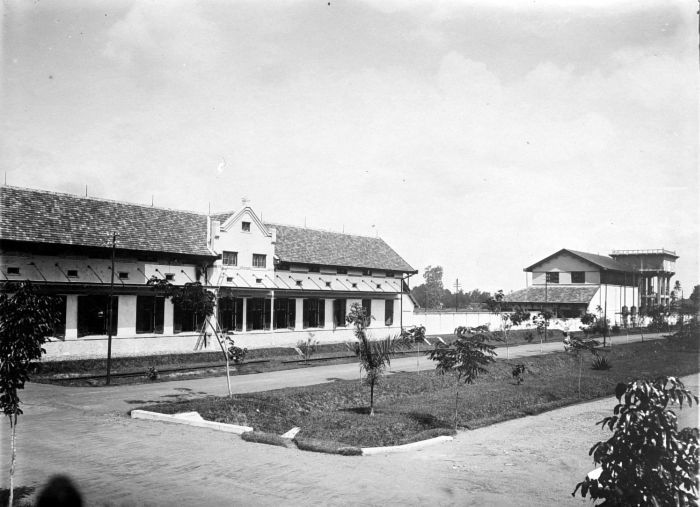
Offices, power station and high-reservoir of the Central Working-Hall of the NIS in Jogjakarta (now Indonesian Railways Locomotive Workshop)

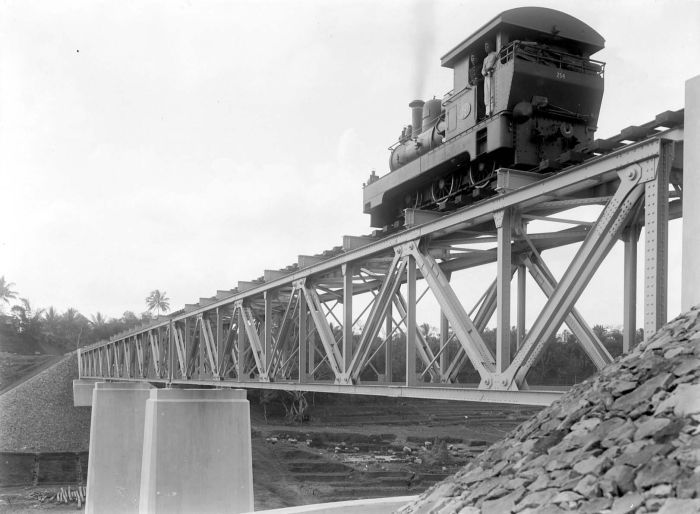
A NIS 254 (now known as DKA C 16 03) steam locomotive runs on a railway bridge of the private-owned Dutch East Indies Railway Company on the line between Secang, Magelang and Parakan, Temanggung, Central Java

== See also ==
- Kereta Api Indonesia—a successor of the company.
