= Bogor railway station =

Railway station in Java, Indonesia

B26 Bogor Station Stasiun Bogor
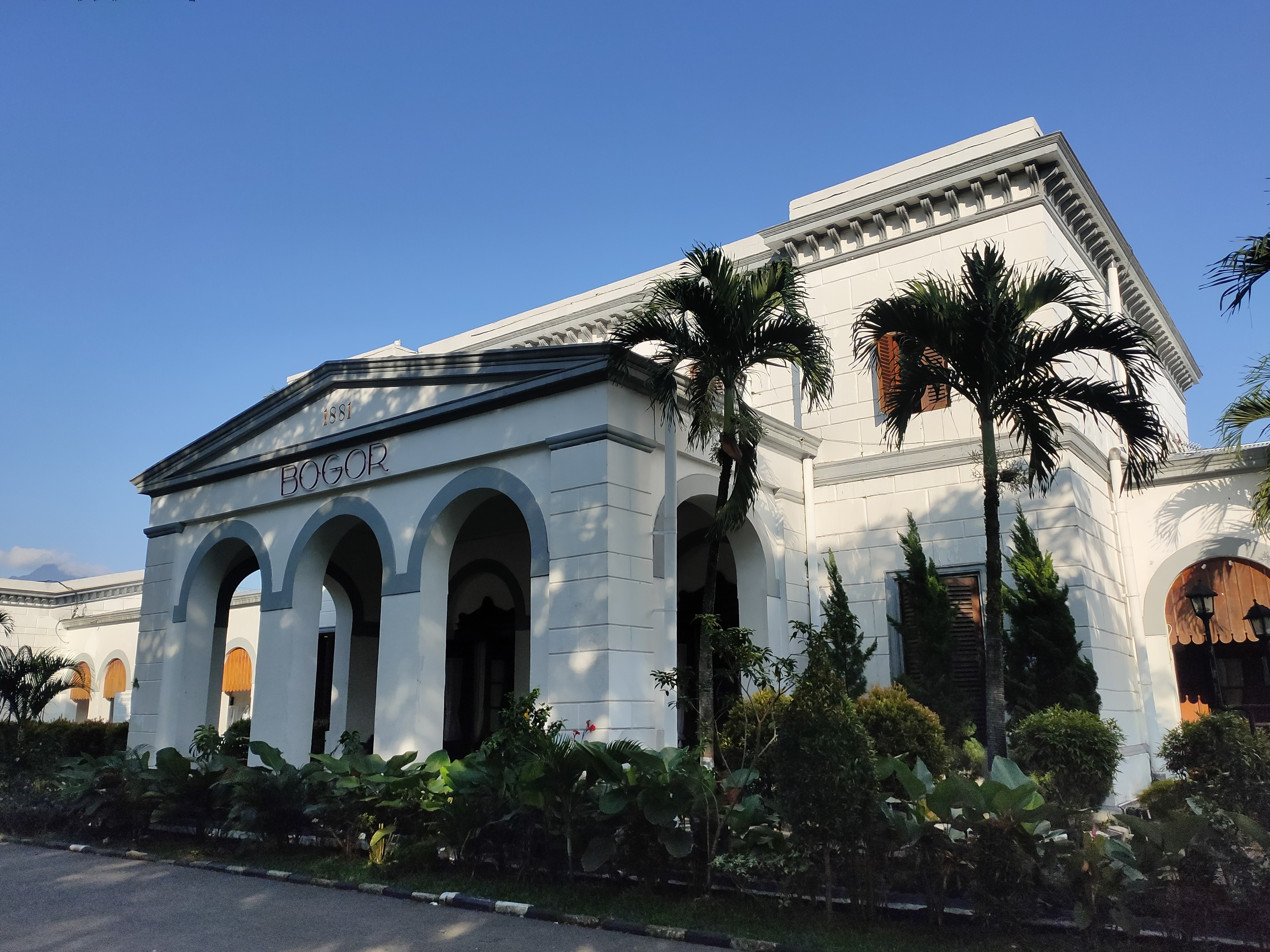
- The gate station in 2022

General information
- Location: Jalan Nyi Raja Permas No.1 Bogor 16124, Central Bogor; Bogor; Indonesia
- Coordinates: 6°35′39″S 106°47′27″E
- Elevation: +246 m (807 ft)
- Owner: Kereta Api Indonesia
- Operator: KAI Commuter
- Lines: Manggarai–Padalarang railway; Bogor Line
- Platforms: 6 bay platforms
- Tracks: 8

Construction
- Structure type: Ground
- Parking: Available
- Accessible: Available
- Architectural style: Indies Empire, Neoclassic

Other information
- Station code: BOO
- Classification: Large type A

History
- Opened: 1873
- Rebuilt: 1881
- Electrified: 1929-1930
- Former names: Buitenzorg Station

Passengers
- 2018: 17.2 million

Services
Commuter:: KRL Commuterline
Agglomeration train: Pangrango train
Preceding station		Following station
Cilebut towards Jakarta Kota	Bogor Commuter Line Jakarta Kota–Bogor, vice versa.	Terminus
Location
- Location within Java

Bogor Station (BOO), formerly Buitenzorg Station, is a railway station located in the city of Bogor, West Java. This station serves as the terminus for the Red Line service of KRL Commuterline. The station has five island platforms and two side platforms. The station is located +246 meters above sea level.

This station is the terminal station for Commuterline trips that serve the Jabodetabek area. Completed in 1881, the station originally faced east. However, with the development of the increasingly crowded KRL Commuterline, the departure gate for Commuterline passengers was moved to the west. Since 17 December 2021, both doors have been operated equally.

This station is busy with commuters from Bogor to Jakarta. Currently, this station serves the Bogor Line towards and from Jakarta Kota. Since 1 June 2022, the Pangrango train line, which previously only served shunting, now serves passengers regularly.

This station is used to serve intercity trains. Nowadays, the intercity services have moved from this station to the nearby Bogor Paledang station.

== History ==
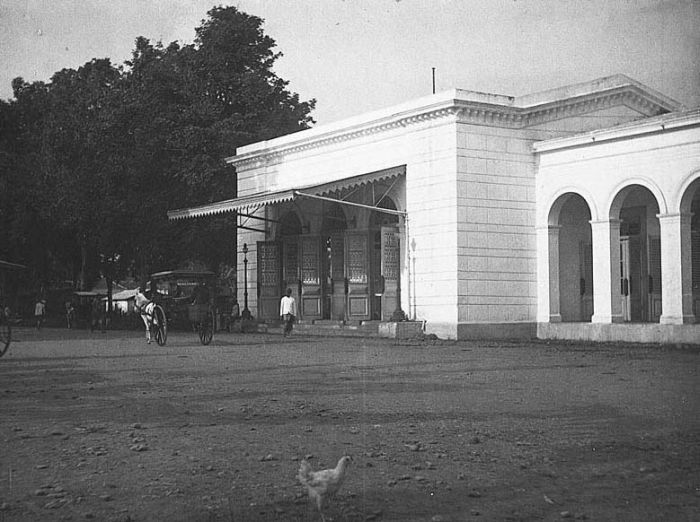
The Buitenzorg station in October 1904

In the early 1870s, the Nederlandsch-Indische Spoorweg Maatschappij built a station at Buitenzorg (Bogor's previous name) as the last section of the Batavia–Buitenzorg railway linking Kleine Boom with Buitenzorg. The station opened for the first time to the public on 31 January 1873 and it was built in the style of Neoclassical architecture. No less than the first 40 years, this station was managed by NIS.

In 1881, Staatsspoorwegen (SS) built the second Buitenzorg Station as part of the construction of the Bogor–Bandung–Banjar–Kutoarjo–Yogyakarta railway line. The construction of this railroad line requires the role of the government considering the construction costs are more expensive than the construction of flat tracks. By appointing David Maarschalk as head of the service, the first phase of the SS railway line was built, namely the construction of the southern Java line and the construction of the Surabaya-Pasuruan-Malang line. As of 5 October 1881, the first segment of the railroad line, Bogor–Cicurug, had been completed. As of 17 May 1884, the route had extended to Bandung.

In 1913, the Batavia–Buitenzorg railway line was purchased by the SS. In the past, a large field called Wilhelmina Park was once part of the Bogor station.

The station renovation was once carried out by the Ministry of Transportation in 2009. The station building which reads "1881", which faces Nyi Raja Permas street, was never used as the station entrance for the public with the station door being moved to face Mayor Oking street.

On 20 October 2016, KRL Commuterline unveiled a new 570 square meter hall built in front of the station. This expansion was built mainly to maximize the passenger flow and to separate both incoming and outgoing passengers.

After years of not being serviced, the old station building facing east was reopened on 17 December 2021. This east door faces Bogor City Square (Indonesian: Alun-alun Kota Bogor). The departure gate on the east side of the station is directly integrated with the square. To support the operations of the east gate, KAI Commuter has built a ticket box at the entrance, ten e-gates, and two vending machines in the hall of the station building.

== Architecture ==
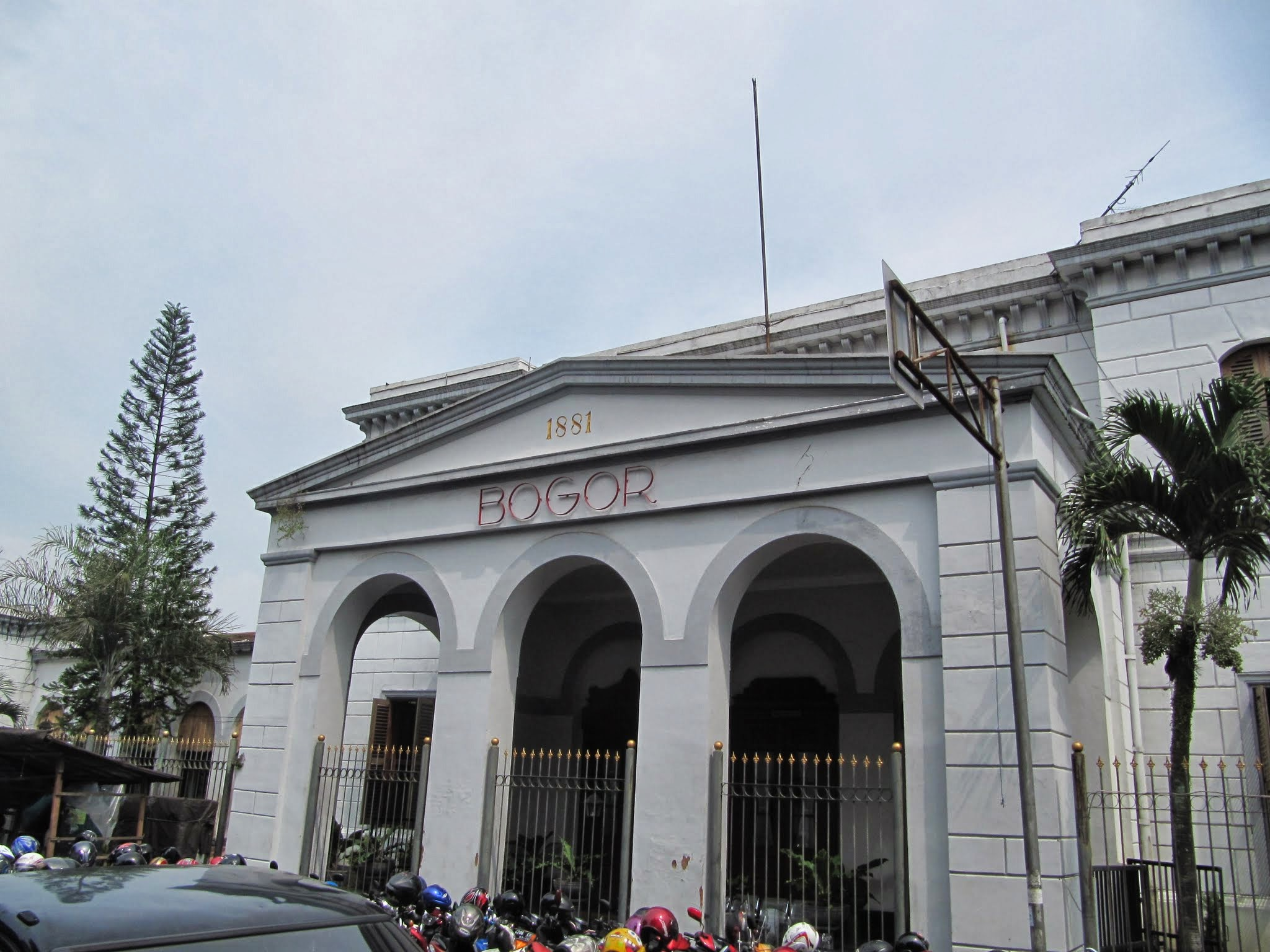
The façade of the Bogor station (2013)

This station is thick with European nuances; rich in geometric ornaments such as clouds, lion's legs, and niches influenced by the Classical Greek style with symmetrical and all-geometric elements. The style of the station building is Indische Empire with a touch of Neoclassical style main entrance and lobby.

In the VIP room stands a marble inscription as high as 1 meter. This monument is a symbol of congratulations from SS employees to David Maarschalk who is entering retirement for his efforts to develop railroads in Java. This inscription was made as a substitute for the statue of David Maarschalk which was previously in place of this inscription.

The gable shape and arched arch on the front façade give the building a graceful impression. The walls are made of stucco bricks with striped strokes and a molding cornice framing the gable roof above. Windows and doors are made of wood with a strong size so as to give the building a classic impression. The station platform is covered with an overcapping umbrella made of corrugated iron supported by a steel frame. The station has two floors connected by a winding staircase.

Currently, although the main station building has remained relatively unchanged, the overcapping of the station has undergone changes. The roof overpass of the station has now been partially hollowed out and cut, and the steel framework has also been partially cut above line 3 to accommodate the overhead power cables when the Batavia–Buitenzorg KRL was in operation. The KRL started operating in 1925 to commemorate the 50th anniversary of the SS.

== Station layout ==
The station has two adjoining buildings. The main building is the entrance area to the station, lobby, administration office, ticket sales, and other facilities. Meanwhile, the second building is an overcapping building that houses the platform and two railroad tracks.

This station has eight railway lines. Line 3 is a straight line in the direction of Depok-Jakarta as well as a single-lane railway in the direction of Cianjur–Padalarang. Line 5 is a double track straight downstream direction (from Depok-Jakarta).

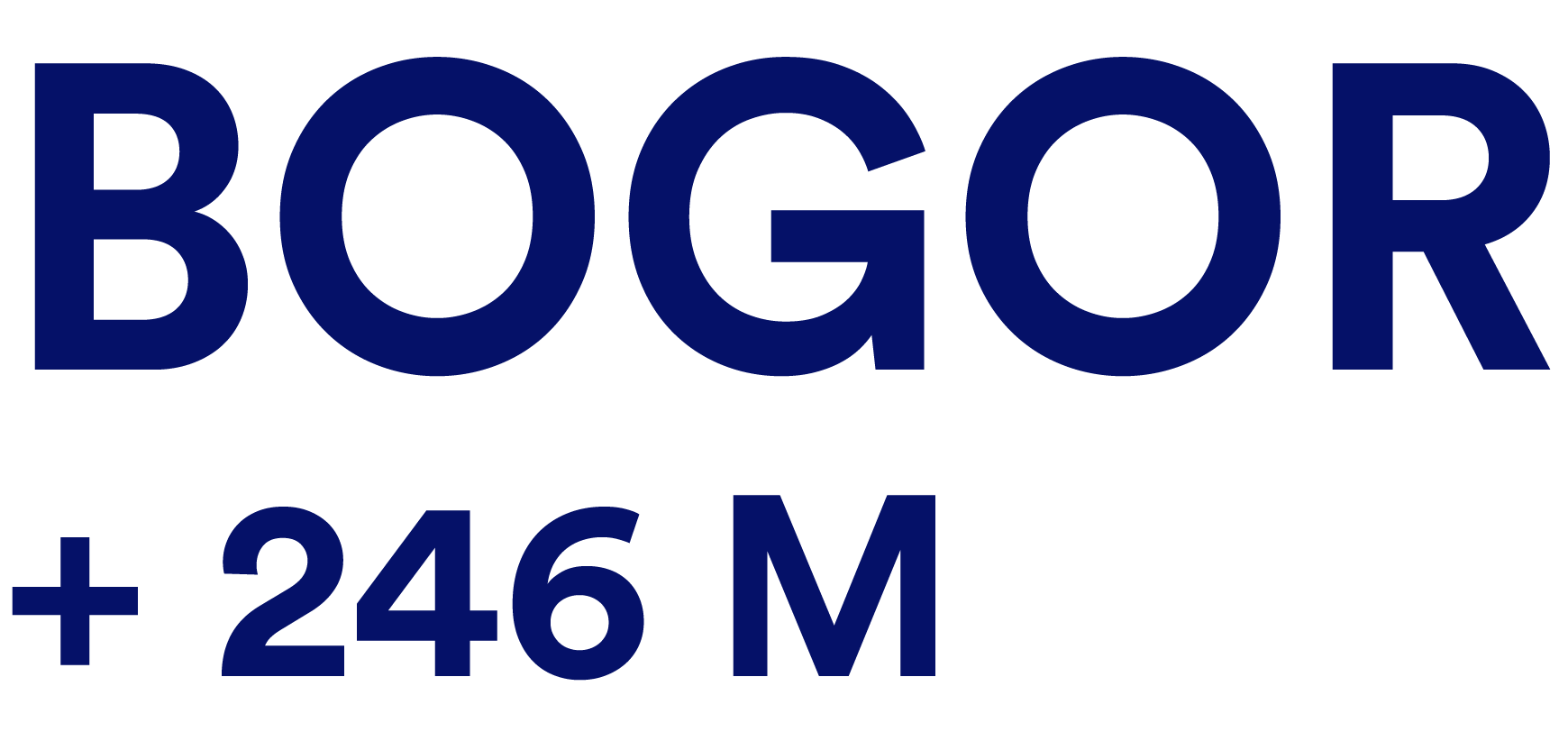
B26
G
Main building (departures and arrivals)
P

Platform floor

Side platform
Line 1
Shutter path from and towards the Bogor KRL Depot
Line 2
End line of the Bogor Line→

PG Pangrango to Sukabumi (Bogor Paledang) →

Island platform, the doors are opened on the right side of the train arrival on line 2, or on the left side of the train arrival on line 3
Line 3
← (Cilebut) Bogor Line to Jakarta Kota
Straight double tracks to Depok–Jakarta

Straight single track to Sukabumi

Island platform, the doors are opened on the right side of the train arrival on line 3, or the left side of the train arrival on line 4
Line 4
← (Cilebut) Bogor Line to Jakarta Kota
Pangrango train shutter path
Island platform, the doors are opened on the right side of the train arrival on line 4, or on the left side of the train arrival on line 5
Line 5
End line of the Bogor Line →

Straight double tracks from Depok–Jakarta
Pangrango train shutter path

Line 6
End line of the Bogor Line →
Island platform, the doors are opened on the right side of the train arrival on line 6, or on the left side of the train arrival on line 7
Line 7
← (Cilebut) Bogor Line to Jakarta Kota
Line 8
End line of the Bogor Line→
Side platform, the doors are opened on the right side of the train arrival
G
Passenger departure and arrival building

== Services ==
The following is a list of train services at the Bogor Station.

=== Passenger services ===
- KAI Commuter
  - Bogor Line, to Jakarta Kota
- Agglomeration train
  - Pangrango (From Bogor to Sukabumi Station)

== Supporting transportation ==
Type	Route	Destination
BISKITA-Trans Pakuan (BRT)	2F	Bubulak Bus Terminal–Ciawi (via Cidangiang–Baranangsiang Bus Terminal) (at the Stasiun Bogor 2 bus stop/west gate)
BISKITA-Trans Pakuan (BRT)	3F	Bubulak Bus Terminal–Sukasari (at the Stasiun Bogor 2 bus stop/west gate)
BISKITA-Trans Pakuan (BRT)	5F	Ciparigi–Bogor Station (at the Stasiun Bogor bus stop/east gate)
JR Connexion (Perum DAMRI)	x7	Bogor Station–Juanda Station
JR Connexion (Perum DAMRI)	x8	Bogor Station–Manggarai Station
JR Connexion (Perum DAMRI)	x9	Bogor Station–Tebet Station
JR Connexion (Perum DAMRI)	x10	Bogor Station–Tanah Abang Station
Angkot	02	Sukasari-Terminal Bubulak (via Jalan Ir. H. Juanda–Jalan Pajajaran)
Angkot	03	Baranangsiang Bus Terminal- Bubulak Bus Terminal (via Jalan Otto Iskandardinata–Jalan Suryakencana)
Angkot	05	Merdeka Bus Terminal–Ciparigi
Angkot	14	Bubulak Bus Terminal-Katulampa
Angkot	16	Pasar Anyar-Kedung Badak
Angkot	17	Pasar Anyar-Curug
Angkot	18	Pasar Anyar-Bubulak Bus Terminal
Angkot	19	Merdeka Bus Terminal-Situgede
Angkot	20	Bogor Station–Bubulak Bus Terminal
Angkot	32	Merdeka Bus Terminal–Pamoyanan
Angkot	F05	Ciomas-Merdeka Bus Terminal
Angkot	F06	Pasar Parung-Merdeka Bus Terminal
Angkot	F06A	Pasar Ciampea-Merdeka Bus Terminal
Angkot	F07	Bojong Gede Bus Terminal-Pasar Anyar

== Places of interest ==
- Bogor Botanical Gardens
- Bogor Palace
- Museum Nasional Sejarah Alam Indonesia (Indonesian Museum of Ethnobotany)
- Museum Perjuangan Bogor (Bogor Perjuangan Museum)
- Pembela Tanah Air Museum
- Bogor Agricultural University Baranangsiang Campus
- Jagorawi Toll Road Bogor Toll Gate

== Incidents ==
- On 30 August 2022, an angkot with route number 08 heading for Citeureup-Pasar Anyar, it was suspected that the brakes failed at the railroad crossing on Jalan Kebon Pedes in the Bogor–Cilebut compartment. The angkot was also hit by the KRL Commuterline heading for Jakarta Kota with train number KA 4073 and rolled over to the side of the rails. Luckily the driver managed to get out before the train hit the angkot. As a result, several KRL trips experienced diversions resulting in a buildup of passengers at Bogor Station and a number of other stations.

== Gallery ==
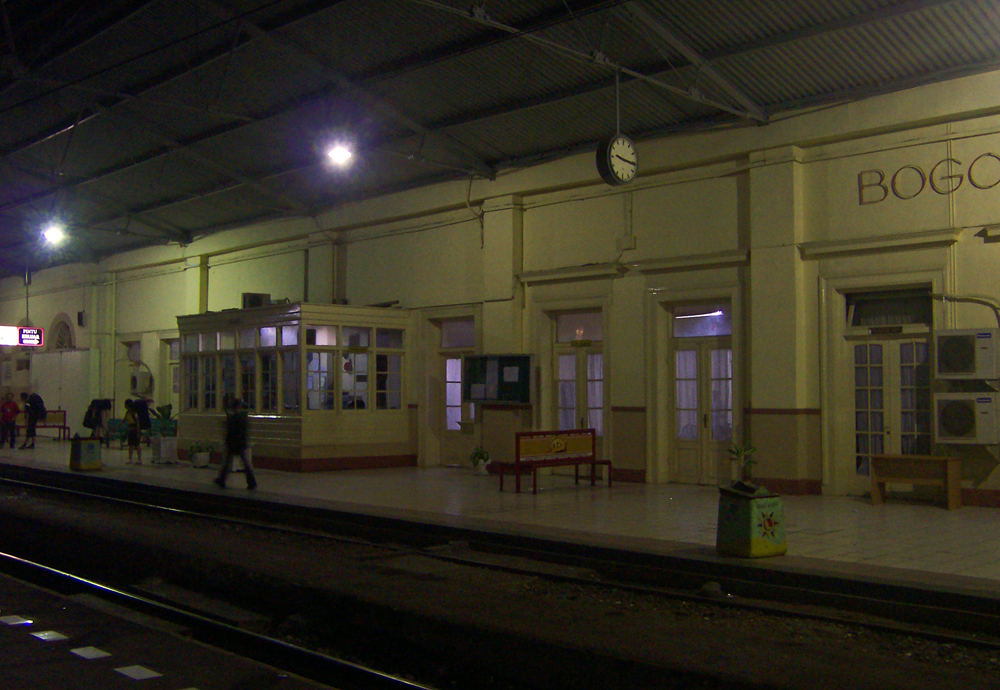
The station platform at night (2005)

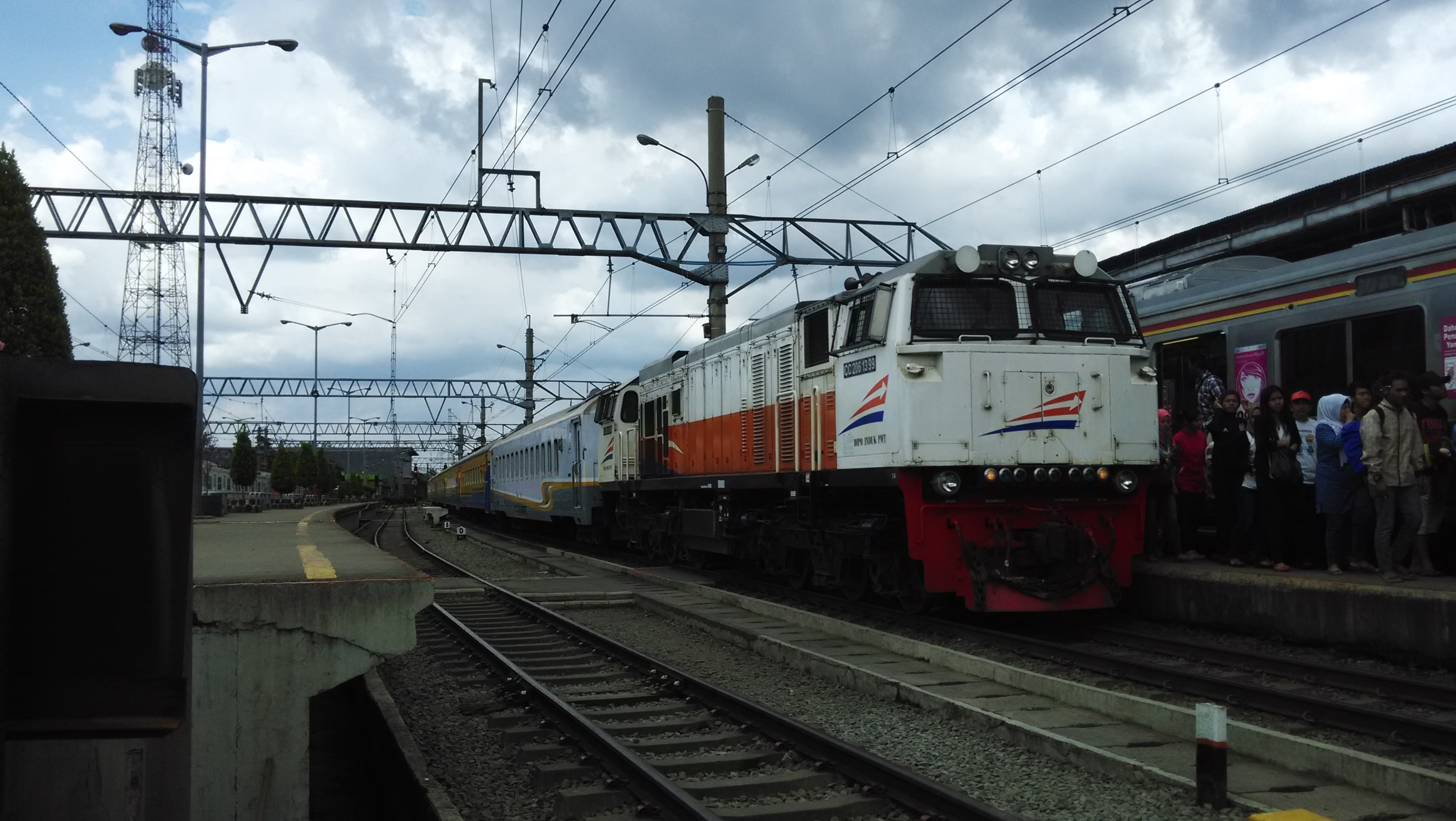
Pangrango train shutter path preparing to depart from Bogor Station to Bogor Paledang station

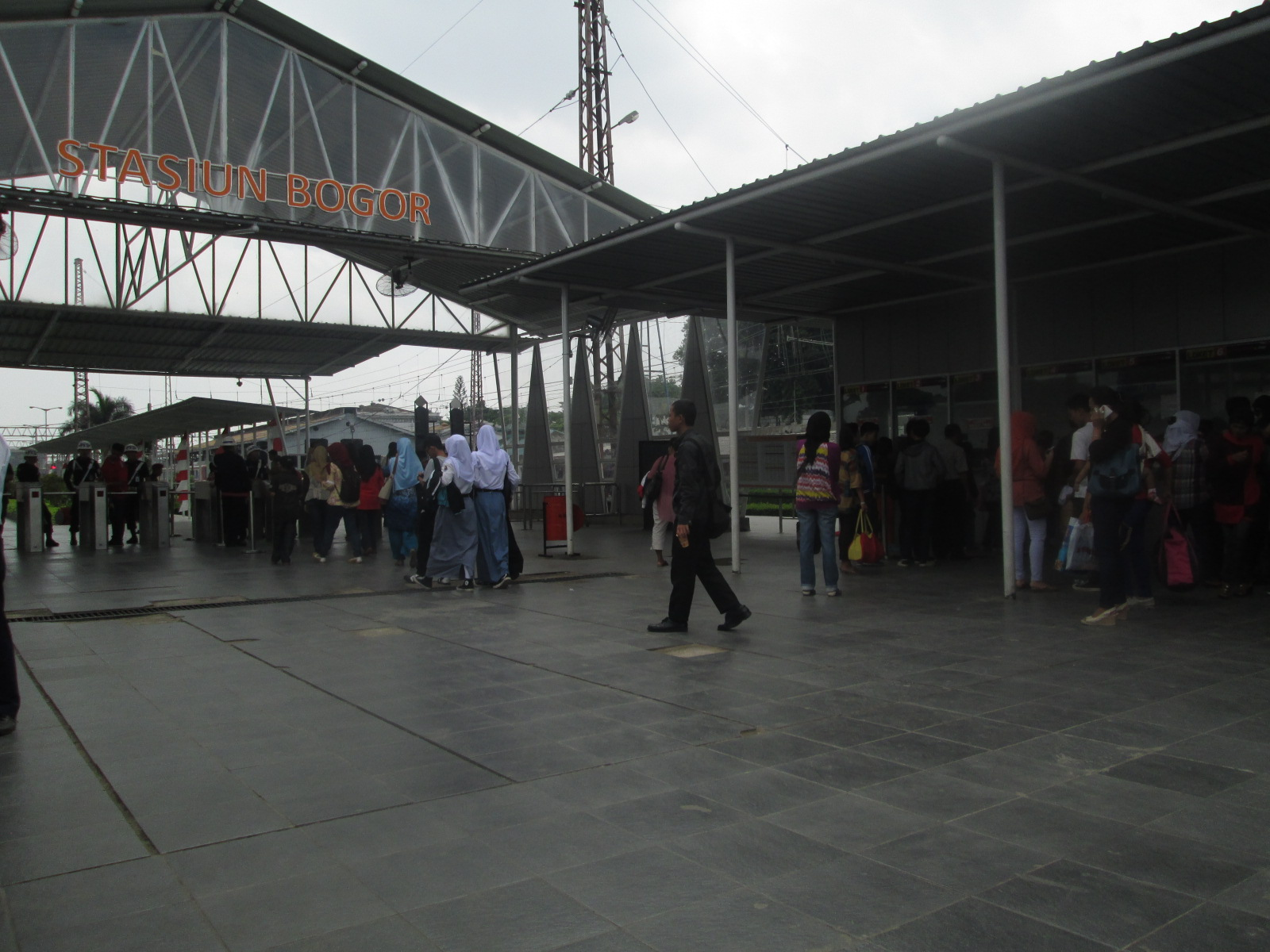
The west entrance gate of the station

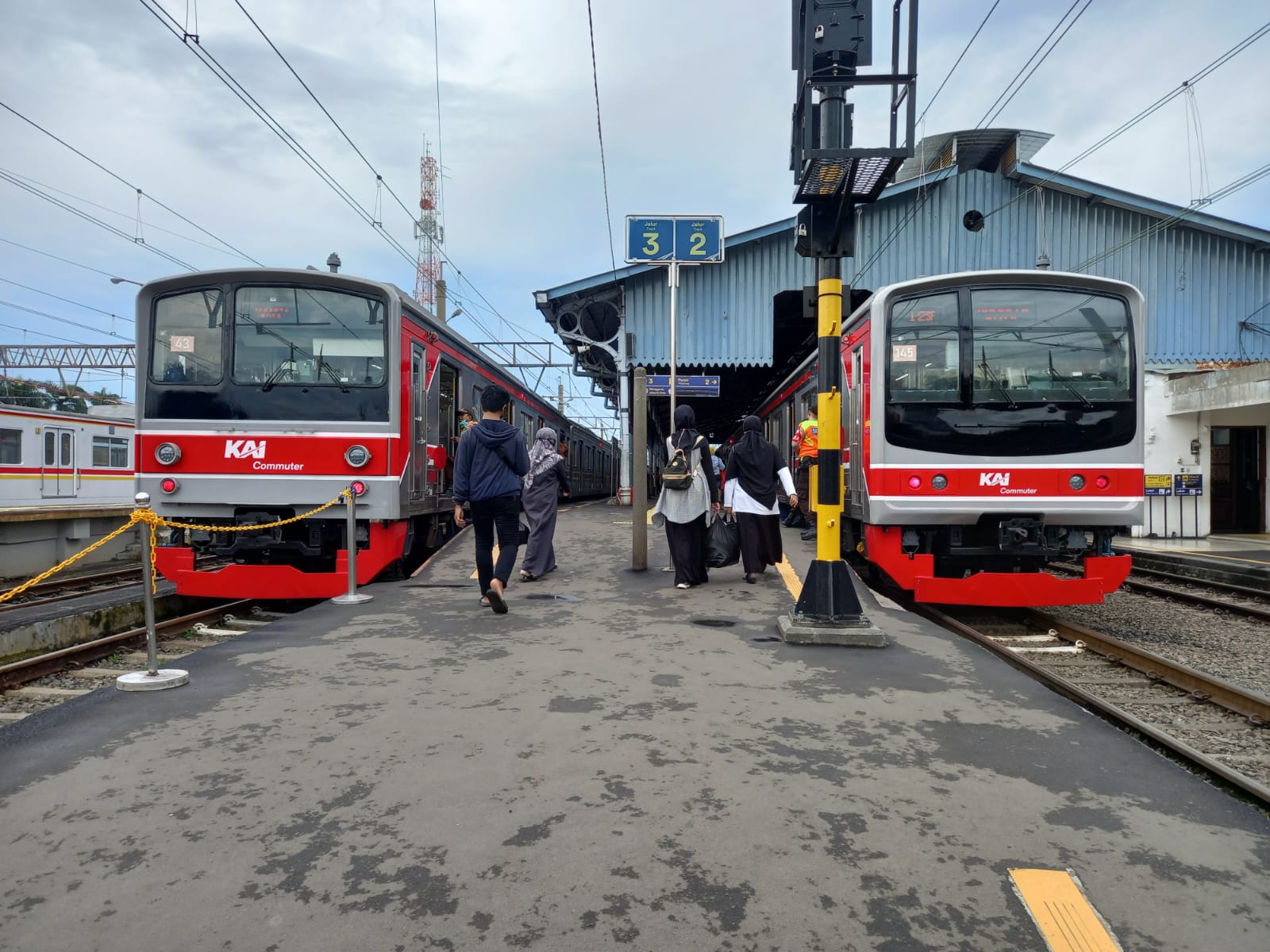
Two JR 205 trains at Bogor Station

Preceding station	Kereta Api Indonesia	Following station
Cilebut towards Jakarta Kota	Jakarta Kota–Bogor	Termini

Preceding station	Kereta Api Indonesia	Following station
Termini	Bogor–Padalarang–Kasugihan	Bogor Paledang towards Kasugihan
