= Jakarta Kota railway station =

Railway station in Indonesia

B01 TP01 Jakarta Kota Station Stasiun Jakarta Kota
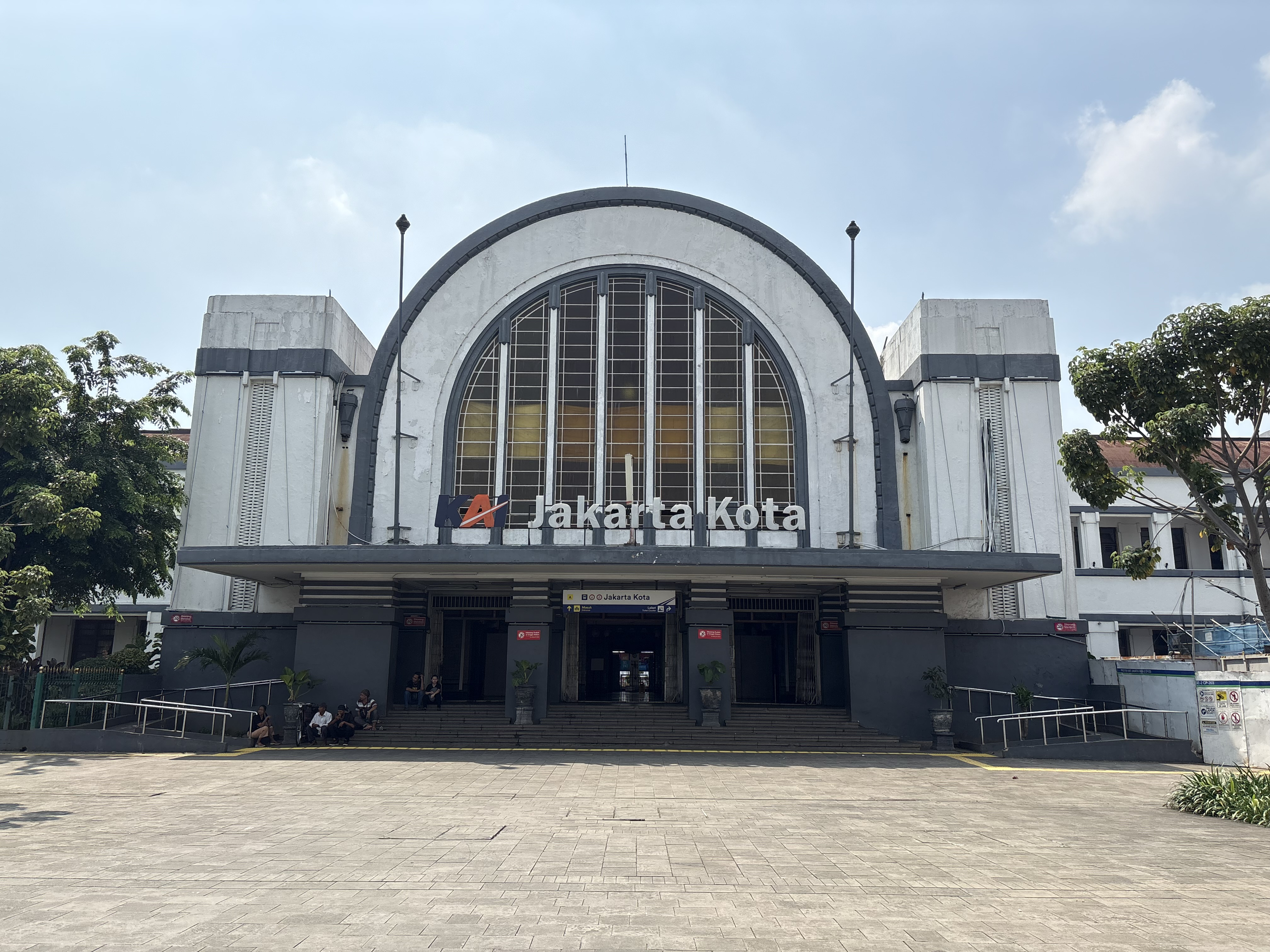
- Jakarta Kota station west entrance

General information
- Location: Jalan Stasiun Kota No. 1 Pinangsia, Taman Sari; West Jakarta 11110; Indonesia
- Coordinates: 6.137579°S 106.814634°E
- Elevation: +4 m (13 ft)
- System: Commuter rail station
- Owner: Kereta Api Indonesia
- Operator: Kereta Api Indonesia; KAI Commuter
- Lines: Bogor Line; Tanjung Priuk Line
- Platforms: 6 bay platforms
- Tracks: 12
- Connections: Kota

Construction
- Accessible: Available
- Architect: Frans Johan Louwrens Ghijsels
- Architectural style: Art deco

Other information
- Station code: JAKK • 0420
- Classification: Large type A

History
- Opened: 1887 (old building); 1929 (current building)
- Rebuilt: 1926–1929
- Former names: Batavia Zuid; Batavia-Benedenstad; Djakarta
- Original company: Batavian Eastern Railway Company

Services
Preceding station		Following station
Terminus	Commuter Line Bogor	Jayakarta towards Bogor or Nambo
Terminus	Tanjung Priok Line	Kampung Bandan towards Tanjung Priok
Terminus	Commuter Line Cikarang Branch towards Jakarta Kota; Only for midnight and dawn schedules	Kampung Bandan towards Bekasi or Cikarang via Pasar Senen
Location
- Location within Jakarta

Jakarta Kota Station (Indonesian: Stasiun Jakarta Kota, station code: JAKK) is a railway station, located in the old city core of Kota Tua, Jakarta, Indonesia. It serves as one of the major terminus stations in Jakarta, serving two of the five Greater Jakarta commuter rail lines.

The station was named Batavia Zuid (or South Batavia) until the beginning of the 20th century. The station was also popularly known as the Beos Station as an abbreviation of the station's former owner Bataviasche Oosterspoorweg Maatschapij (BOS).

== History ==
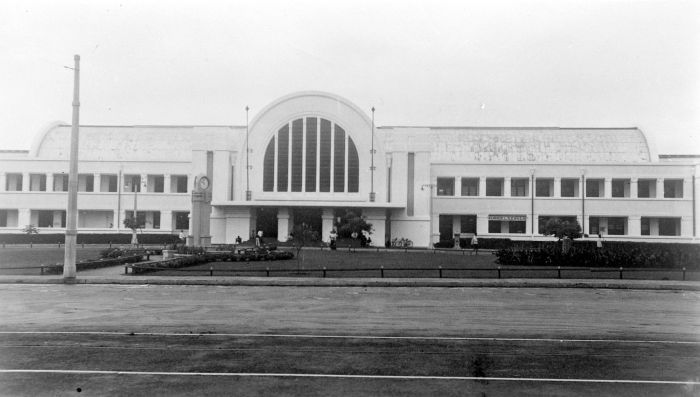
The station in 1938

The name Beos on the station's nickname has many versions. First, the name Beos refers to the owner of the Batavia station Bataviasche Oosterspoorweg Maatschapij (Batavia Eastern Railway Company or BOS), which was at the same location before it was demolished. This was a private railway company that connected Batavia with Kedunggedeh. On another version, Beos comes from the word Batavia En Omstreken, which means "Batavia and its Surroundings", which comes from the station's function as a rail transportation center that connects Batavia with other cities such as Bekassie (Bekasi), Buitenzorg (Bogor), Parijs van Java (Bandung), Karavam (Karawang), and others.

Actually, there is still another name for this Jakarta Kota Station, namely Batavia Zuid which means South Batavia Station. This name arose because at the end of the 19th century, Batavia already had more than two train stations. One of them is the Batavia Noord Station (North Batavia), located south of the present-day Jakarta History Museum. Batavia Noord originally belonged to the Nederlandsch-Indische Spoorweg Maatschappij railway company and was the terminus for the Batavia-Buitenzorg line. In 1913 the Batavia-Buitenzorg line was sold to the Dutch East Indies government and managed by the Staatsspoorwegen. At that time the Jatinegara and Tanjung Priok areas were not yet part of the Batavian gemeente.

The first station was built in 1887 by the BOS, a private railway company. The station was named Batavia Zuid (South Batavia) to distinguish it from the older Batavia Noord (North Batavia) station (owned by the Nederlandsch-Indische Spoorweg Maatschappij, another private railway company), which was situated a small distance to the north, directly behind the former city hall. The public railway company Staatsspoorwegen acquired both the southern and northern station in 1898 and 1913 respectively.

The southern BOS station was closed in 1923, and was rebuilt between 1926 and 1929, during which all rail services were temporarily taken over by the Batavia North station. The station building was designed in 1927–1928 by the architects Asselbergs, Frans Johan Louwrens Ghijsels, and Hes from the architectural company Algemeen Ingenieurs-en Architectenbureau (AIA) in Batavia. During construction in 1928–1929 concrete from the Hollandsche Beton Maatschappij ("Dutch Concrete Company") was used. The main building was designed with 12 railway tracks, designated to connect Batavia with Buitenzorg, the port of Tandjoeng Priok, and the port of Merak near the Sunda Strait with a ferry connecting Western Java with Southern Sumatra. The new and current building was officially opened on 8 October 1929 with a private ceremony by the company staff. All rail services to the old city were then reassigned to the new southern station, while the remaining northern station was demolished.

Jakarta Kota Station was finally designated as a cultural heritage through Special Capital Region of Jakarta Governor Decree No. 475 in 1993. Although it is still functioning, there are still some corners that are not well maintained. Its existence began to be disturbed by the news of the construction of a shopping mall on top of the station building. Likewise, cleanliness is not maintained properly, trash is scattered on the railroad tracks. In addition, many people who live on either side of the tracks near the station reduce the aesthetic value of this station. Now, Kereta Api Indonesia, through the Preservation Unit for Historical Objects and Buildings, has begun to organize this historic station.

== Building and layout ==
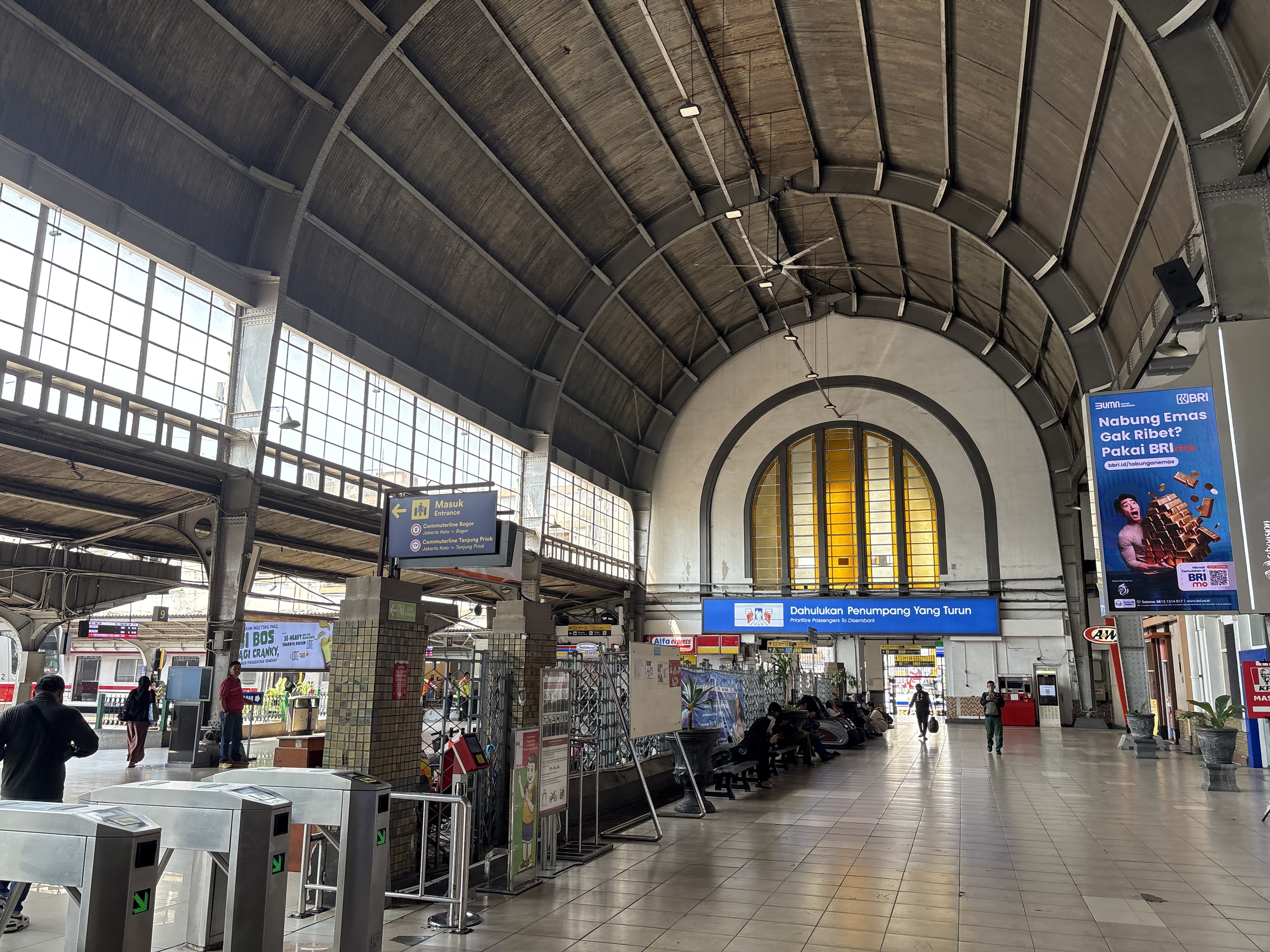
The main hall inside

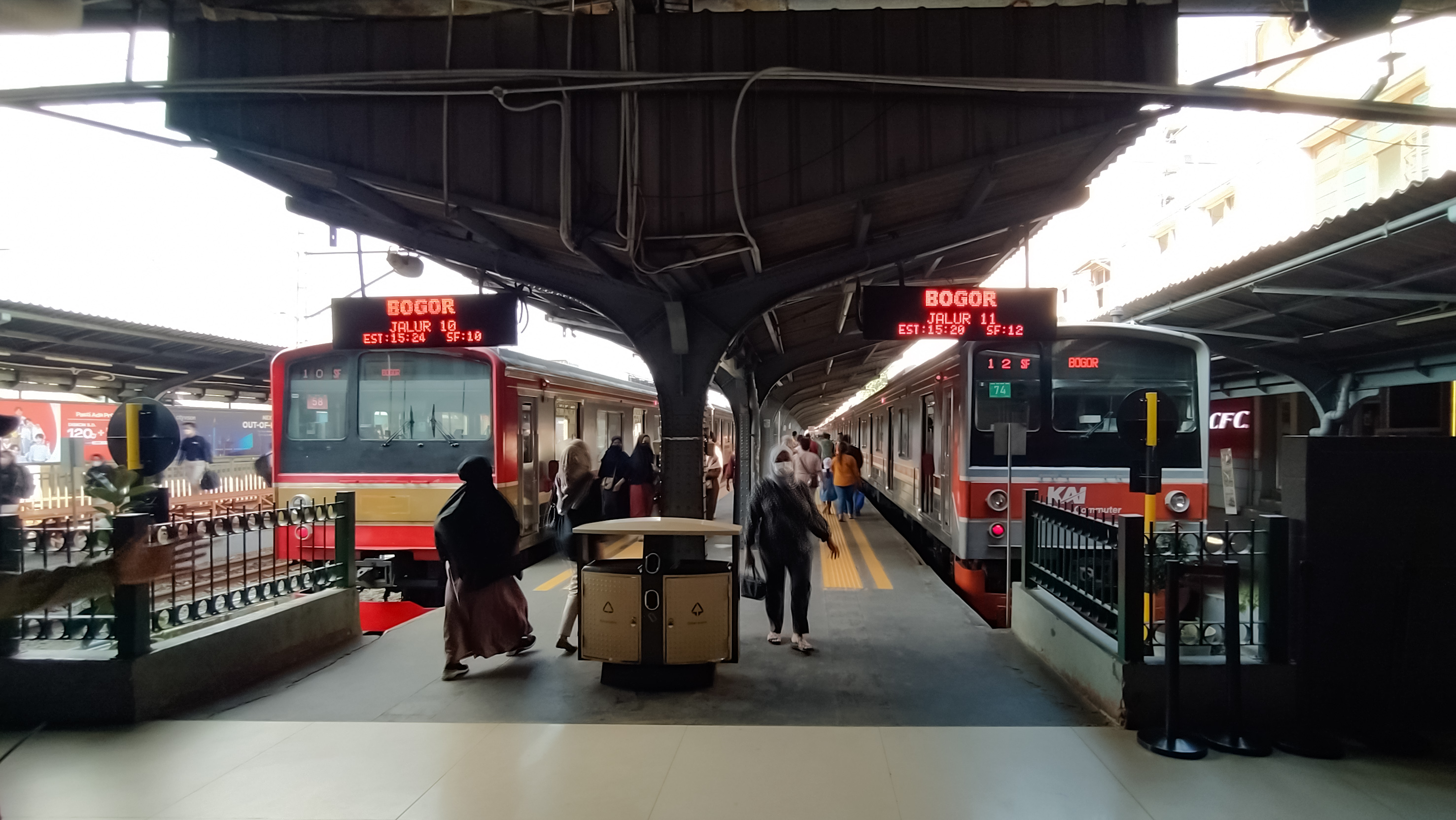
Two KRL Commuterline trains heading to Bogor

The station was designed by Dutch architect Frans Johan Louwrens Ghijsels. The architecture is Ghijsels' masterpiece known as the Het Indische Bouwen expression, which is a combination of western modern art deco structures and techniques combined with local traditional forms. With a thick art deco dressing, this Ghijsels design seems simple even though it has a high taste of architectural value, adhering to an ancient Greek philosophy: simplicity is the shortest path to beauty.

Jakarta Kota Station is a two-storey station surrounded by streets on three sides with one main entrance and two side entrances. The main entrance and hall are characterized by a barrel vault roof with openings horizontally composed with the top dominated by vertical units (lunettes).

The inside wall of the hall is finished with rough-textured brown ceramic and the outside wall at the bottom of the whole building was covered with green-yellowish plaster. The station floor uses yellow teak and grey wood, and for the platform floor yellow waffle teakwood is used. Jakarta Kota Station has six platforms serving 12 tracks. The platforms are sheltered by canopies supported by steel columns.

Initially, this station had twelve railway lines with tracks 4 and 5 being a double track straight line from and towards Kampung Bandan Bawah–Pasar Senen–Jatinegara, lines 8 and 9 being a double track straight line from and towards Kampung Bandan Atas–Tanjung Priuk, as well as lines 11 and 12 are straight double track elevated tracks from and towards Gambir–Manggarai. However, the number of lines has decreased to eleven lines because the old line 1 has been closed and converted to a passenger waiting room for intercity train passengers prior to service withdrawal in 2025.

The station was last renovated in 2019. As of 23 February 2020, the English railroad switch and station scissors which have been in use for almost fifty years have now been replaced with the latest ones.

B01 TP01
G
North entrance/exit
Station hall
Side platform
Line 1
Train parking lane
Line 2
Train parking lane
Bay platform
Line 3
← End line of the Bogor Line
Line 4
Bogor Line to Bogor or Nambo (Jayakarta) →
Bay platform
Line 5
Train parking lane
Line 6
Train parking lane
Bay platform
Line 7
← End line of the Tanjung Priok Line
Line 8
Tanjung Priok Line to Tanjung Priok (Kampung Bandan) →
Bay platform
Line 9
Train parking lane

Straight tracks from and towards the train depot

Line 10
Bogor Line to Bogor or Nambo (Jayakarta) →
Bay platform
Line 11
Bogor Line to Bogor or Nambo (Jayakarta) →
Side platform
G
South entrance/exit

== Services ==
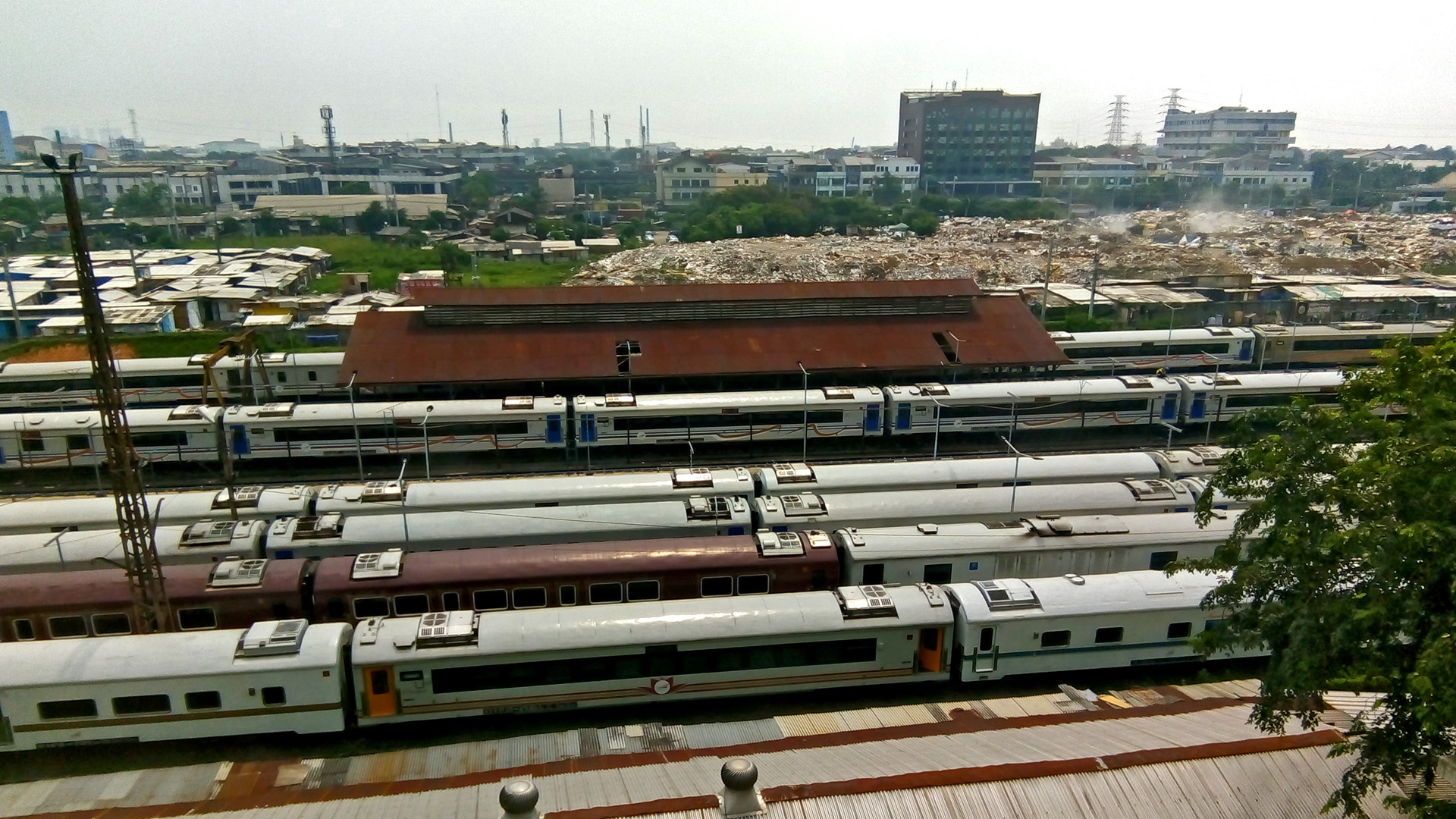
The train depot of the station

Since around 2013–2014 all long and medium distance passenger trains that used to have a terminus to Jakarta Kota Station were diverted to Pasar Senen Station, including the Gumarang, Gaya Baru Malam Selatan, Tegal Arum (now defunct), and Serayu. The transfer was also carried out to Gambir for Argo Parahyangan and Gajayana trains. Since 9 February 2017 all local train trips to the east (Walahar Ekspres/Local Purwakarta and Jatiluhur/Lokal Cikampek) have been moved to Tanjung Priuk Station.

Since May 29, 2019, three economy class long and medium distance train trips which originally ended at Pasar Senen Station (Jayakarta, Menoreh and Kutojaya Utara), have now been moved to Jakarta Kota Station. With the implementation of Gapeka 2021, on 10 February 2021, the Jayakarta train terminal station was returned to Pasar Senen Station to facilitate long-car train passenger services.

On 1 February 2025, Kutojaya Utara ceased operating as a regular intercity service, being absorbed into the Sawunggalih service, although the service occasionally returns during high demand but terminates at Pasar Senen instead. The last Kutojaya Utara trains departed and arrived on 31 January 2025 as the very last intercity trains ever to and from Jakarta Kota, and the station now only serves commuter trains.

=== Passenger services ===
Type	Route	Destination	Notes
KRL Commuterline	Bogor Line	Bogor	
KRL Commuterline	Bogor Line (Nambo branch)	Nambo	
KRL Commuterline	Tanjung Priok Line	Tanjung Priuk	

== Supporting transportation ==
System		Station	Route	Destination	Notes
Transjakarta	BRT	Kota	List of Transjakarta corridors#Corridor 1	Blok M–Kota	–
Transjakarta	BRT	Kota		Jelambar–Kota	–
Transjakarta	BRT	Kota	List of TransJakarta corridors#Corridor 12	Pluit–Tanjung Priok	–
Transjakarta	Transjakarta city bus (non-BRT)	Kota	1A	Pantai Maju Promenade—Balai Kota (regular)	–
Transjakarta	Transjakarta city bus (non-BRT)	Kota	2M	Jakarta Kota Station–Pulo Gadung	–
Transjakarta	Transjakarta city bus (non-BRT)	Kota	12A	Kota–Kaliadem (regular)	–
Transjakarta	Transjakarta city bus (non-BRT)	Kota	12B	Pluit—Senen via Pasar Ikan—Muara Karang (regular)	–
Transjakarta	MikroTrans Jak Lingko (non-BRT)	N/A	JAK 10	Jakarta Kota Station—Tanah Abang Station	–
Transjakarta	MikroTrans Jak Lingko (non-BRT)	N/A	JAK 13	Jakarta Kota Station—Tanah Abang Station via Jembatan Lima	–
Transjakarta	MikroTrans Jak Lingko (non-BRT)	N/A	JAK 120	Muara Angke–Jakarta International Stadium	–

== Incidents ==
- On 26 December 2014 at 06.30, the CC201 89 07 locomotive crashed into the platform at Jakarta Kota Station, when it was shunting the Argo Parahyangan train circuit. The locomotive was too fast to stop, so it jumped off the rails and then crushed the platform floor. There were no casualties in this incident.

== See also ==
- Rail transport in Indonesia
