= KAI Commuter Loop Line =

Commuter rail line in Indonesia

Loop Line
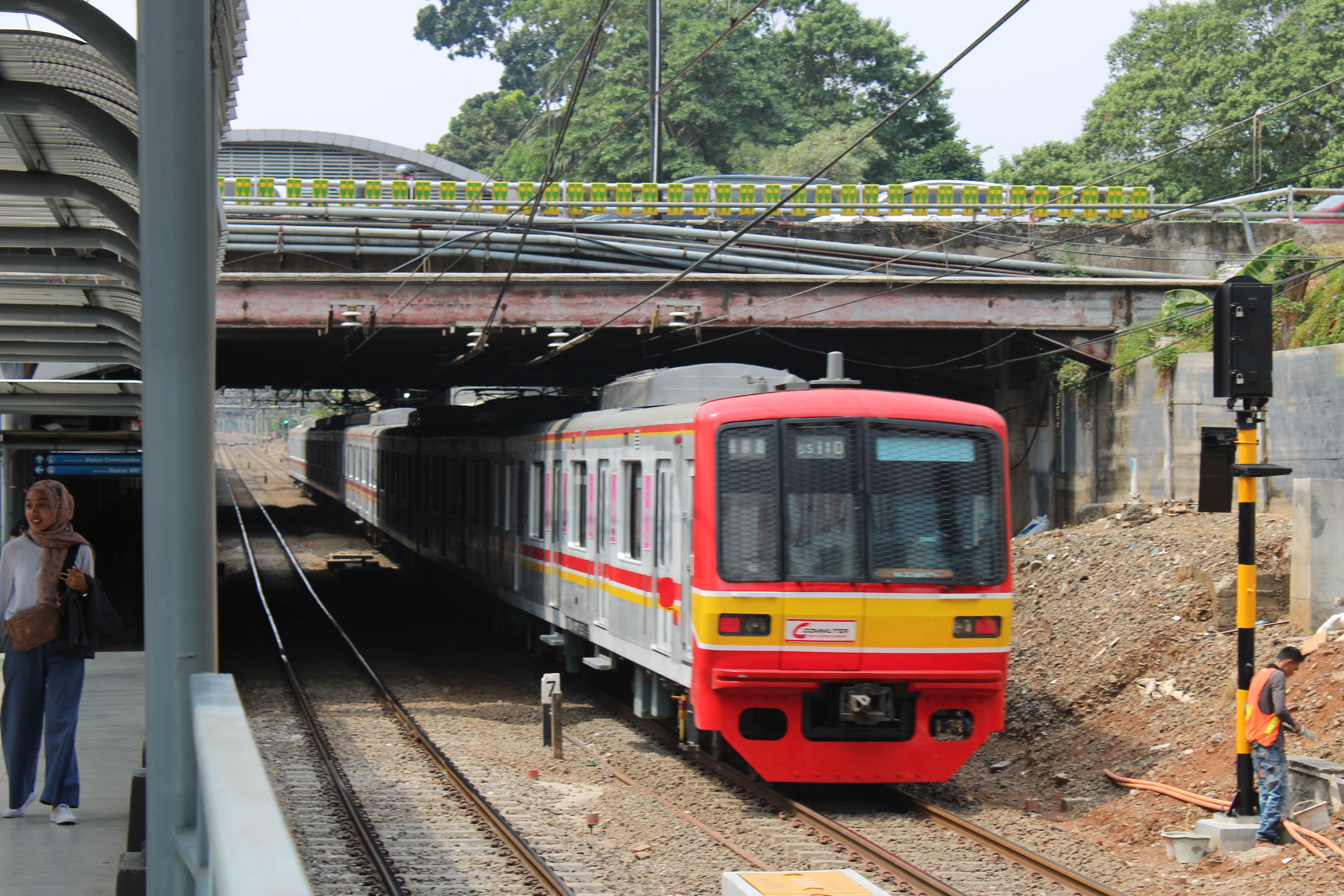
- A Commuterline train at Sudirman heading to Nambo.

Overview
- Status: Inactive
- Owner: PT Kereta Api Indonesia
- Locale: East Jakarta; Central Jakarta; North Jakarta; West Jakarta; South Jakarta; Depok; Bogor (regency); Bogor
- Termini: Jatinegara Angke; Bogor Depok Nambo
- Stations: 31
- Website: http://www.krl.co.id/

Service
- Type: Commuter rail
- System: KRL Commuterline
- Services: 2
- Operator(s): PT Kereta Commuter Indonesia
- Depot(s): Bukit Duri (BUD); Depok (DP); Bogor(BOO)
- Rolling stock: 203 series 205 series Tokyo Metro 05 series

History
- Opened: 1987 (original); 5 December 2011 (as 'Yellow Line')
- Closed: 27 May 2022

Technical
- Line length: 69.352 km (43.093 mi)
- Track gauge: 1,067 mm (3 ft 6 in)

KAI Commuter Loop Line (also known as Jatinegara–Bogor Line) or the Jakarta loop line was a commuter rail line in Indonesia, operated by PT Kereta Commuter Indonesia (KCI). The line connected Jatinegara station in East Jakarta and Bogor station in Bogor, West Java. On maps and diagrams, the line was shown using the colour "yellow" ( ). The Jatinegara–Bogor line was the second busiest line in the KA Commuter system. Covering the distance of 69.35 kilometres, it was the longest KA Commuter line, combining the loop-line on Jatinegara–Kampung Bandan–Tanah Abang–Manggarai with Manggarai–Depok–Bogor lines.

The yellow line, especially the loopline corridor between Jatinegara and Manggarai stations was the main trunk line or feeder for KA Commuter line system. It connects to the Tanjung Priok Line at Kampung Bandan, Tangerang Line at Duri, Rangkasbitung Line at Tanah Abang, and the then-named Cikarang Line at Jatinegara and Manggarai. The line and stations between Manggarai and Bogor were shared with the then-named Central Line. There was a branch line connecting Duri in West Jakarta to Nambo station in Bogor Regency, the intersection was located after Citayam.

KAI Commuter announced on 21 May 2022 that the line would be deactivated by 28 May 2022, as part of Manggarai station upgrade. Its inner city loop section was absorbed by a new alignment of the Cikarang Line, which was renamed Cikarang Loop Line, with trains running in a full loop in addition to existing Jatinegara-Cikarang section. Its branch to Nambo was absorbed by the Central Line, which was renamed Bogor Line, with trains running to and from Jakarta Kota instead of Angke.

== Stations ==
The distance table of Commuterline stations. This data was correct on 27 May 2022.

Station	Distance (km)		Transfers/ Notes		Location		Now Part Of
Station	From previous station	From Jakarta Termini	Transfers/ Notes		Location		Now Part Of
Jatinegara	-	0.0	KAI Commuter Cikarang Loop Line	Terminal station Interchange station to Jatinegara Pasar Jatinegara Stasiun Jatinegara 2	East Jakarta	Jakarta	Cikarang Loop Line
Pondok Jati	1.236	1.236			East Jakarta	Jakarta	Cikarang Loop Line
Kramat	1.829	3.065			Central Jakarta	Jakarta	Cikarang Loop Line
Gang Sentiong	0.973	4.038			Central Jakarta	Jakarta	Cikarang Loop Line
Pasar Senen	1.567	5.605		Normal stop (Bogor/Kampung Bandan-bound) Pass-through (Jatinegara-bound) Pasar Senen Senen (planned) Senen Senen Sentral Senen Bus Terminal	Central Jakarta	Jakarta	Cikarang Loop Line
Kemayoran	1.436	7.041			Central Jakarta	Jakarta	Cikarang Loop Line
Rajawali	1.901	8.942			Central Jakarta	Jakarta	Cikarang Loop Line
Kampung Bandan	1.444	10.386	KA Commuter Line Jakarta Kota–Tanjung Priok	Interchange station to	North Jakarta	Jakarta	Cikarang Loop Line
Angke	4.102	13.540		Some services & Nambo branch services started here	West Jakarta	Jakarta	Cikarang Loop Line
Duri	1.230	14.770	Soekarno–Hatta Airport Rail Link KA Commuter Line Duri–Tangerang	Interchange station to	West Jakarta	Jakarta	Cikarang Loop Line
Tanah Abang	3.632	18.402	KA Commuter Line Tanah Abang–Rangkasbitung	Interchange station to	Central Jakarta	Jakarta	Cikarang Loop Line
Karet	2.029	20.431			Central Jakarta	Jakarta	Cikarang Loop Line
BNI City			Railink station		Central Jakarta	Jakarta	Cikarang Loop Line
Sudirman	0.811	21.242		Dukuh Atas BNI Dukuh Atas BNI City Dukuh Atas 1 Dukuh Atas 2	Central Jakarta	Jakarta	Cikarang Loop Line
Mampang			Ghost station		Central Jakarta	Jakarta	Cikarang Loop Line
Manggarai	3.186	24.428	KAI Commuter Cikarang Loop Line KAI Commuter Bogor Line	Interchange station to Manggarai Manggarai Bus Terminal Manggarai (U/C)	South Jakarta	Jakarta	Bogor Line Cikarang Loop Line
Tebet	2.610	27.038	KAI Commuter Bogor Line		South Jakarta	Jakarta	Bogor Line
Cawang	1.301	28.339	KAI Commuter Bogor Line	Cikoko Cikoko Stasiun Cawang	South Jakarta	Jakarta	Bogor Line
Duren Kalibata	1.475	29.814	KAI Commuter Bogor Line		South Jakarta	Jakarta	Bogor Line
Pasar Minggu Baru	1.509	31.323	KAI Commuter Bogor Line		South Jakarta	Jakarta	Bogor Line
Pasar Minggu	1.695	33.018	KAI Commuter Bogor Line	Pasar Minggu Bus Terminal	South Jakarta	Jakarta	Bogor Line
Tanjung Barat	3.031	36.049	KAI Commuter Bogor Line		South Jakarta	Jakarta	Bogor Line
Lenteng Agung	2.460	38.509	KAI Commuter Bogor Line		South Jakarta	Jakarta	Bogor Line
Universitas Pancasila	1.029	39.538	KAI Commuter Bogor Line		South Jakarta	Jakarta	Bogor Line
Universitas Indonesia	2.264	41.802	KAI Commuter Bogor Line		Depok	West Java	Bogor Line
Pondok Cina	1.109	42.911	KAI Commuter Bogor Line		Depok	West Java	Bogor Line
Depok Baru	2.570	45.481	KAI Commuter Bogor Line	Depok City BRT (corridor 1) at Terminal Depok Depok Bus Terminal (via short walk)	Depok	West Java	Bogor Line
Depok	1.741	47.222	KAI Commuter Bogor Line	Some services terminate here	Depok	West Java	Bogor Line
Citayam	5.084	52.306	KAI Commuter Bogor Line	Interchange to Nambo Branch	Depok	West Java	Bogor Line
Bojong Gede	5.197	57.503	KAI Commuter Bogor Line	Bojong Gede Bus Terminal (via short walk)	Bogor Regency	West Java	Bogor Line
Cilebut	4.331	61.834	KAI Commuter Bogor Line		Bogor Regency	West Java	Bogor Line
Bogor	7.518	69.352	KAI Commuter Bogor Line	Terminal station Pangrango regional train (at Bogor Paledang)	Bogor	West Java	Bogor Line

=== Nambo branch line ===
Station	Distance (km)		Transfers/ Notes		Location		Now Part Of
Station	From previous station	From Jakarta Termini	Transfers/ Notes		Location		Now Part Of
Angke	-	0.0		Nambo branch terminus	West Jakarta	Jakarta	Cikarang Loop Line
From Angke to Citayam follows Loop line
Branching off Loop line at Citayam
Citayam	5.084	38.766	KAI Commuter Bogor Line	Interchange to Interchange to main line	Depok	West Java	Bogor Line
Pondok Rajeg			Ghost station		Depok	West Java	Bogor Line
Cibinong	6.740	45.506		Cibinong Bus Terminal	Bogor Regency	West Java	Bogor Line
Gunung Putri			Ghost station		Bogor Regency	West Java	Bogor Line
Nambo	6.527	52.033		Terminal station	Bogor Regency	West Java	Bogor Line

=== Proposed extension ===
Ministry of Transportation have attempted to examine the possibility of extending the line beyond Bogor towards Sukabumi. In February 2021, a tender for feasibility study for Bogor-Lido track electrification was announced by Kemenhub's e-procurement website. In May 2021, a regional office of the ministry posted an update to existing Bogor-Sukabumi double-tracking project, mentioning the possibility of KRL Commuterline extension to Sukabumi.

== Rolling stocks ==
- Former JR East 203 series (8, 10 car per set)
- Former JR East 205 series (8, 10 car per set)
- Tokyo Metro 05 series
- Tokyo Metro 6000 series (8, 10 car per set)
- Tokyo Metro 7000 series

== Incidents and accidents ==
- On Sunday, March 10, 2019, a former Tokyu 8500 series trainset (no. 8612F) travelling as KA 1722 on Jatinegara–Bogor line derailed between Cilebut and Bogor station. KA 1722 crashed, rolled over, and hit the LAA (overhead catenary) pole until it collapsed and the train body dented on the front side. Meanwhile, car no. 8712 and 8912 rolled over. There are no reports of casualties, the four undamaged cars were joined to trainset 8610F to form a 12-car trainset and the rest were written off.
