= Universitas =

Universitas is a Latin word meaning "the whole, total, the universe, the world", or in Roman law a society or corporation; the latter sense is where the word university is derived from.

Universitas may also refer to:

- Universitas 21, an international network of research-intensive universities
- Universitas 21 Global or U21Global, an online graduate school backed by Universitas 21
- Universitas (newspaper), a weekly student newspaper at the University of Oslo
- Universitas, Bloemfontein, a suburb of Bloemfontein, South Africa
- 905 Universitas, an asteroid
- A student body, first used to describe the University of Bologna in the 11th century
- Universitas Indonesia railway station, a railway station in Depok, West Java, Indonesia
- Universitas Pancasila railway station, a railway station in Jakarta, Indonesia
- UNIVERSITAS, the Scientific Papers Authors and Publishers Society, located in Kraków, Małopolska, Poland
