= Pondok Cina railway station =

Railway station in Indonesia

B19 Pondok Cina Station Stasiun Pondok Cina
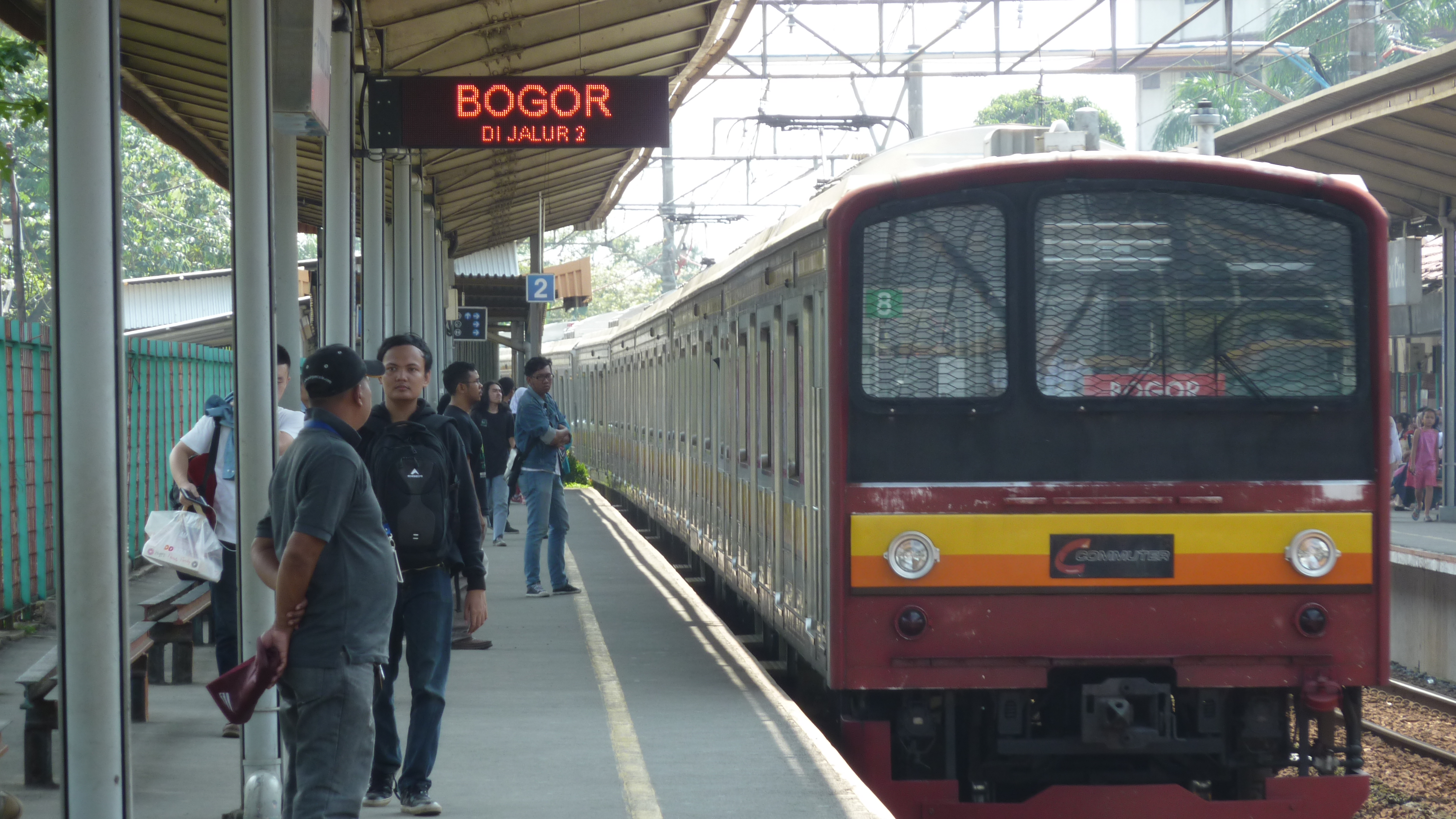
- KRL Commuterline train arriving at Pondok Cina station

General information
- Other names: Pocin Station
- Location: Jalan Margonda Raya, Pondok Cina, Beji, Depok, West Java 16421, Indonesia
- Elevation: +74m
- Owner: Kereta Api Indonesia
- Manager: Kereta Api Indonesia; KAI Commuter
- Line: Bogor Line
- Platforms: 2 side platforms
- Tracks: 2

Construction
- Accessible: Available

Other information
- Station code: POC • 0705
- Classification: II

History
- Opened: 31 January 1873
- Electrified: 1 May 1930
- Former names: Halte Pondok Tjina

Services
| Preceding station | | Following station |
|---|---|---|
| Universitas Indonesia towards Jakarta Kota | Commuter Line Bogor | Depok Baru towards Bogor or Nambo |
Location

Pondok Cina Station (POC) or usually shortened as Pocin Station (casually pronounced pocin or "paw-chin") is a class II railway station in Pondok Cina, Beji, Depok, West Java, Indonesia. The station, which is located at an altitude of +74 m, only serves KRL Commuterline route. Pondok Cina Station is one of the stations that is located nearby the University of Indonesia and Gunadarma University.

The station is commonly used by students from the University of Indonesia and Gunadarma University to get on and off the KRL and is also used by residents who live in Beji. It is located in strategic point, behind Depok Town Square and Margo City shopping malls as well as Code Margonda co-working space.

== History ==
In 1898, the station was called Pondok Tjina railway stop (Halte Pondok Tjina) and located between Lentengagoeng (Lenteng Agung) Station and Depok Station.

Pondok Cina Station area has been redeveloped into a transit-oriented development with new apartments surrounding the station. The residential development is the result of collaboration between KAI and Perumnas. The development was inaugurated by President Joko Widodo on 13 April 2023.

== Station layout ==
Pondok Cina station has two railway tracks.

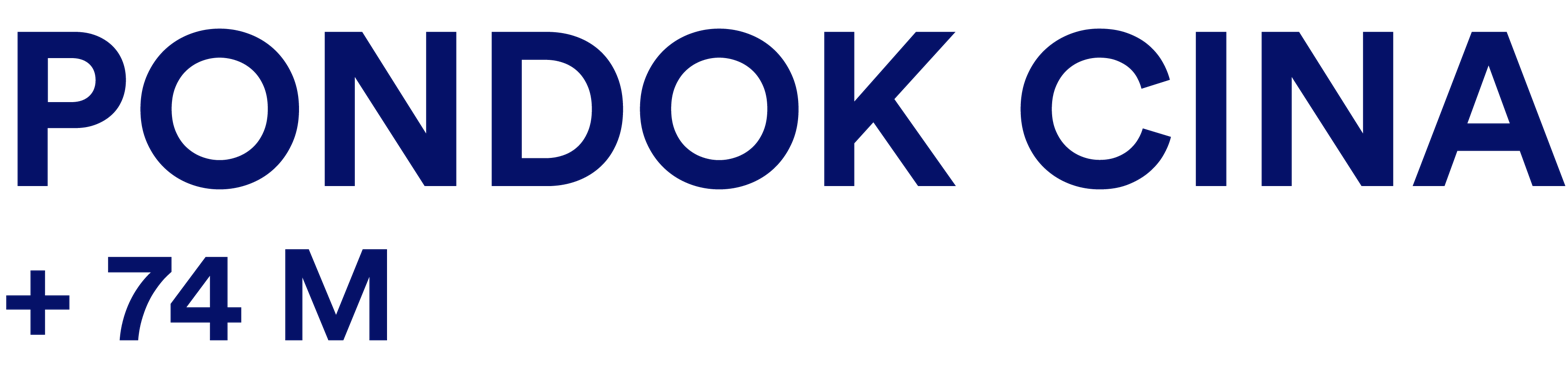
B19
| G | Main building | |
| Platform floor | Side platform, the doors are opened on the right side | |
| Platform floor | Line 1 | ← (Universitas Indonesia) Bogor Line to Jakarta Kota |
| Platform floor | Line 2 | Bogor Line to Bogor or Nambo (Depok Baru) → |
| Platform floor | Side platform, the doors are opened on the right side | |

== Services ==
| Train line name | Destination | Notes |
|---|---|---|
| Bogor Line | Jakarta Kota | - |
| Bogor Line | Bogor | - |
| Bogor Line | Nambo | Only a few trips |

== Supporting transportation ==
| Type | Route | Destination |
|---|---|---|
| Transjabodetabek | DJ2 (regular) | Depok Bus Terminal–Kalideres Bus Terminal (via T.B. Simatupang–Metro Pondok Indah–Sultan Iskandar Muda–Daan Mogot) |
| Angkot | D11 | Depok Bus Terminal–Akses UI–PAL |
| Angkot | D112 | Depok Bus Terminal–Kampung Rambutan Bus Terminal |
| Angkot | T19 | Depok Bus Terminal–Lenteng Agung–Kampung Rambutan Bus Terminal |
| Angkot | M03 | Depok Bus Terminal–Pasar Minggu Bus Terminal |
| Angkot | M04 | Taman Merdeka Depok Timur–Pasar Minggu Bus Terminal |

== Incidents ==
- On 31 July 2010 at 01:45 WIB, Pondok Cina Station was destroyed by a great fire. The ticket counters and several kiosks around the station were also destroyed. When the incident occurred, dozens of residents were unable to take any action to extinguish the fire. This is because Pondok Cina Station is far from a water source. About 40 minutes later, at 02.30 WIB, the Depok Fire Department finally arrived. The fire was then extinguished around 04.00 WIB. Even so, this fire did not disrupt the signaling of incoming trains.
- On 20 January 2022 at 13:25 WIB, The KRL Commuterline train bound for Bogor collided with a student member of the University of Indonesia Faculty of Pharmacy student body who lives in East Jakarta on behalf of Bonita Melia Simatupang, aged 24, when she was about to take her bachelor's degree. The victim initially broke through the rail of the train door and was about to cross the rails. At the time of crossing the victim did not realize that a KRL was about to enter Pondok China Station, the position of the train was very fast and the victim was wearing a headset at that time. The victim's body was picked up and brought home by his family to be buried according to Christian teachings.

| Preceding station | Kereta Api Indonesia | Following station |
|---|---|---|
| Universitas Indonesia towards Manggarai | Manggarai–Padalarang | Depok Baru towards Padalarang |
