= Betawi Museum =

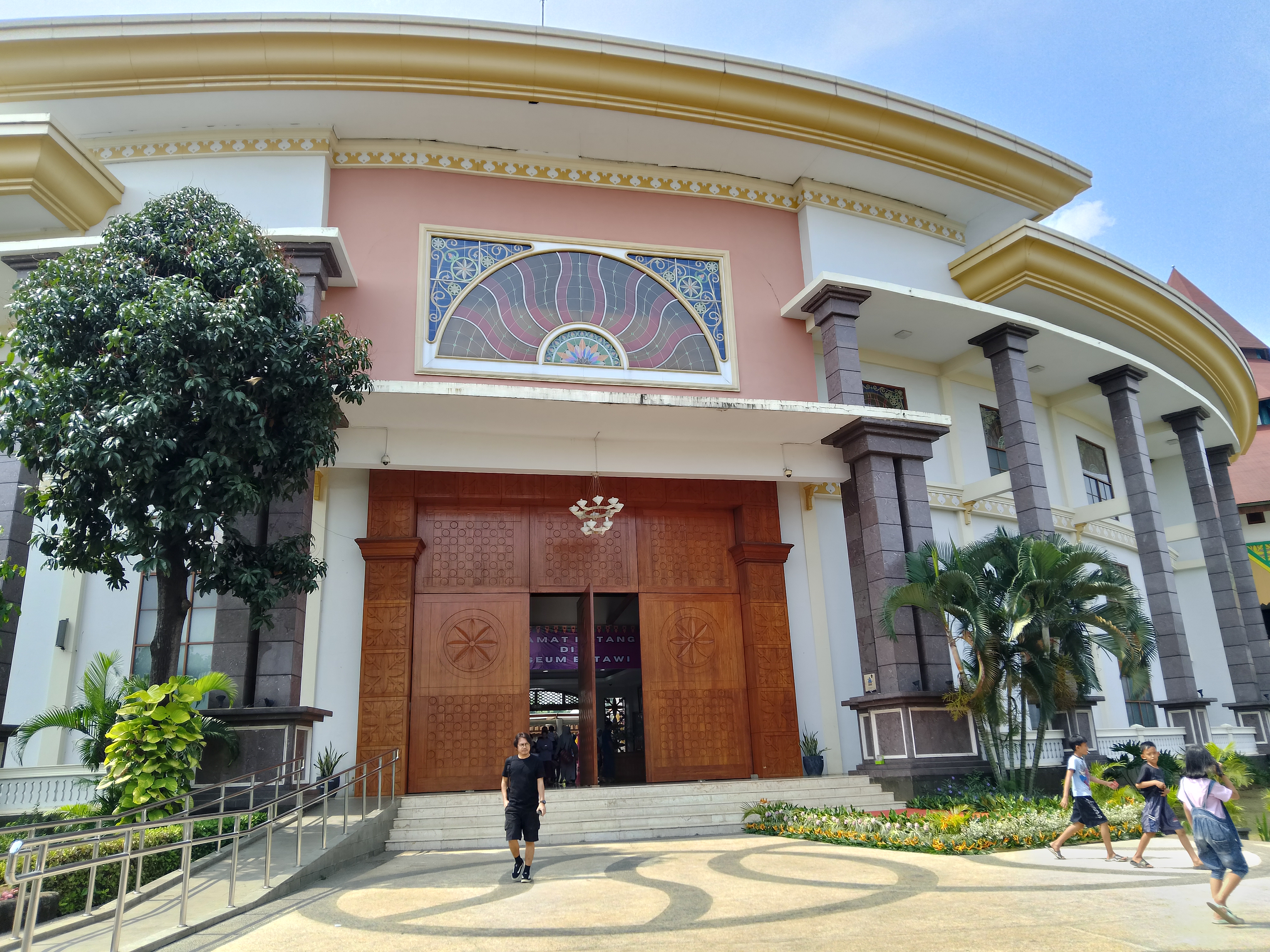
- Facade of the Betawi Museum in South Jakarta, Indonesia
- Established: 30 Juli 2017
- Location: RM. Kahfi II Street, Jagakarsa district, Jakarta, Indonesia
- Coordinates: 6.338308654917041°S 106.82498519698987°E
- Type: Special museum
- Website: Betawi Museum official site

Betawi Museum (Indonesian: Museum Betawi, also known as Museum Betawi Setu Babakan), is an ethnograhical museum located at RM. Kahfi II Street of Jagakarsa district in South Jakarta administrative city of Jakarta, Indonesia. The museum showcases collections related to the activities of the Betawi ethnic group.

== History ==
The museum was constructed over three years from 2012 to 2015, and was initially one of the units managed by the Betawi Cultural Village management body. On July 30, 2017, the museum was officially opened and made available for public visits during the 11th Betawi Lebaran celebration, attended by Indonesian President Joko Widodo.

At the beginning of its opening, only one room was available, displaying collections borrowed from various museums such as the Fatahillah Museum, Mohammad Hoesni Thamrin Building, Textile Museum, Wayang Museum, and Maritime Museum. In 2018, the exhibition space was expanded to two floors, with the first and third floors used as museum spaces, while the second floor remained an office. Eventually, by 2020, the entire building from the first to the third floor was fully utilized as exhibition space for the museum.

On January 11, 2022, Museum Betawi was officially registered and included in the museum database compiled by the Directorate of Cultural Heritage Preservation under the Ministry of Education, Culture, Research, and Technology of Indonesia.

== Collections and building structure ==
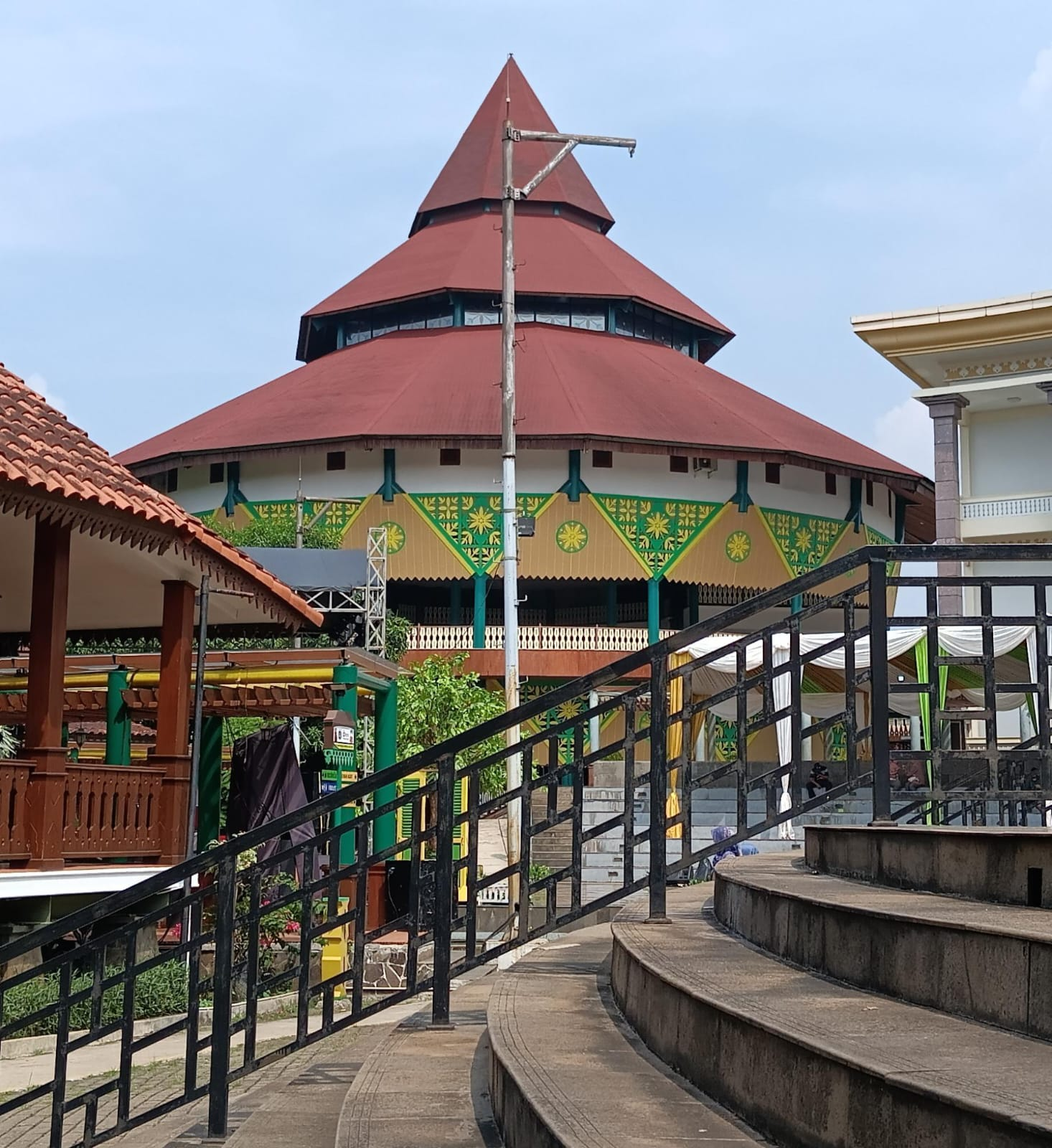
Betawi Museum building, with its three-tiered roof

The three-story building is situated on a 3.2-hectare site, in Zone A area. These three floors house various collections.

The first floor consist of two galleries: the Betawi Cultural Icon Gallery and the Betawi Wedding Gallery. The Cultural Icon Gallery features the traditional Rumah Kebaya house with gigi balang decorative ornaments, and colorful kembang kelapa (coconut flowers) that decorate ondel-ondel puppet and Betawi wedding attire. Beside clothing, iconic food items such as kerak telor (Betawi-style omelet) and bir pletok (non-alcoholic herbal drink) are displayed. Also displayed various Betawi batiks which are characterized by bright colors. Examples are the kebaya kerancang (lace kebaya), and baju sadariah typically worn by men with a peci (cap) and kain cukin (shawl). The Wedding Gallery presents all the wedding accessories, including bridal attire, wedding gifts, musical instruments, and roti buaya (crocodile-shaped bread).

The second floor contains various traditional Betawi household items, such as kukusan (steamer), alu (pestle), pane (wooden rice basket), meja kanjengan (traditional table), and sepeda ontel (vintage roadster). The third floor displays Betawi musical instruments and portraits of Betawi artists like Benyamin Sueb and Mpok Nori.

== See also ==
- Betawi people
