= Pasar Minggu Baru railway station =

Railway station in Indonesia

B13 Pasar Minggu Baru Station Stasiun Pasar Minggu Baru
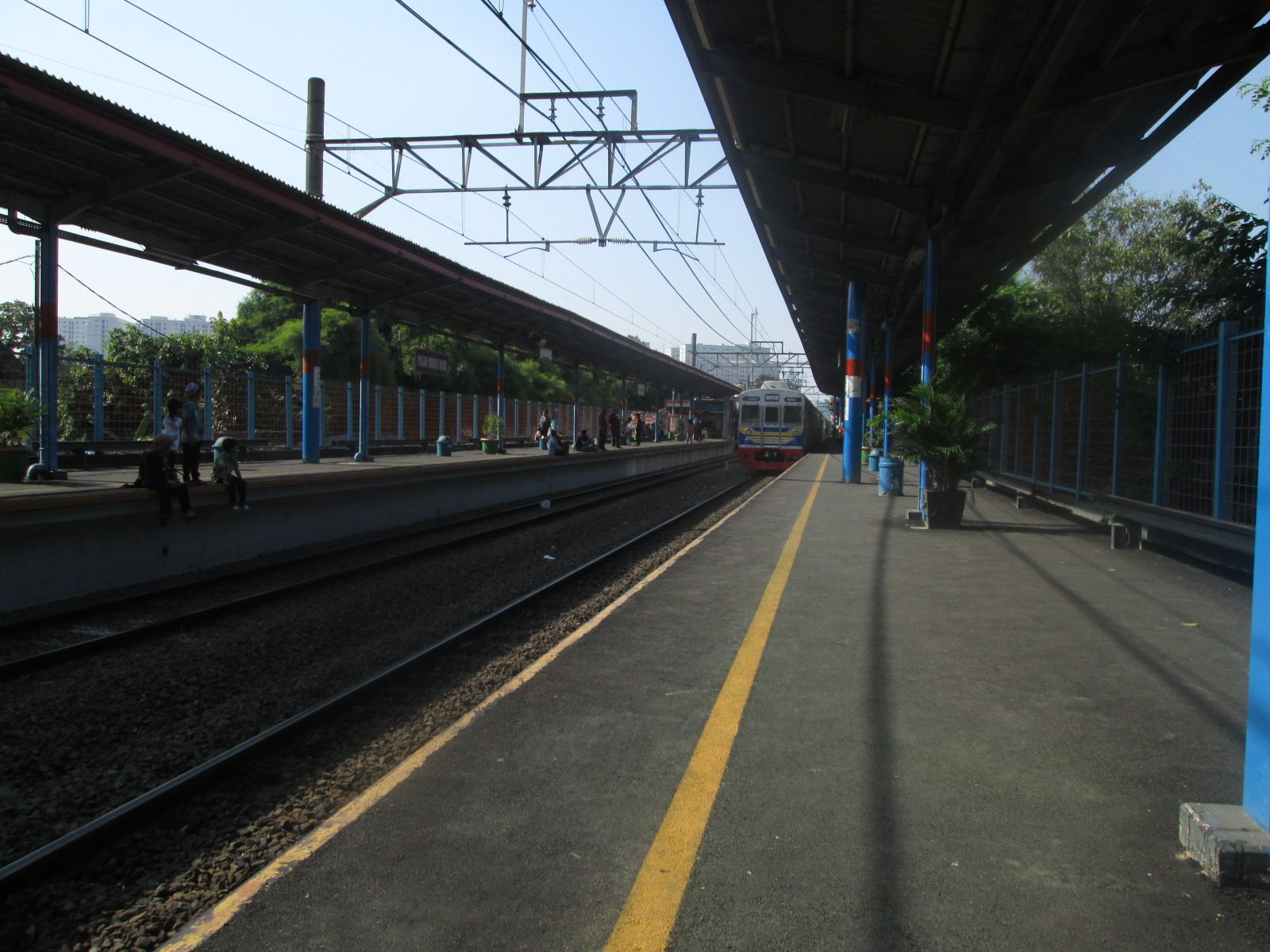
- Northbound platform

General information
- Location: Jl. Rawajati Timur, East Pejaten, Pasar Minggu, South Jakarta; Jakarta; Indonesia
- Coordinates: 6.2628°S 106.8518°E
- Elevation: +29 m (95 ft)
- Owner: Kereta Api Indonesia
- Operator: KAI Commuter
- Lines: Manggarai–Padalarang railway; Bogor Line
- Platforms: 2 side platforms
- Tracks: 2

Construction
- Structure type: Ground
- Parking: Unavailable
- Accessible: Available

Other information
- Station code: PSMB
- Classification: Class II

Services
Preceding station		Following station
Duren Kalibata towards Jakarta Kota	Commuter Line Bogor	Pasar Minggu towards Bogor or Nambo
Location
- Location within Jakarta

Pasar Minggu Baru Station (PSMB) (Indonesian: Stasiun Pasar Minggu Baru) is a railway station in East Pejaten, Pasar Minggu, South Jakarta, Indonesia. The station, which is located at an altitude of + 29 metres, is included in the Jakarta Operational Area I and only serves the KRL Commuterline route.

Since 8 September 2021, this station and Universitas Pancasila Station already have a pedestrian tunnel, which facilitates access for passenger crossing, as well as being equipped with an elevator located in the middle of both sides of the platform.

== Building and layout ==
This station has two railway tracks.

B13 Pasar Minggu Baru
G	Main building	
Platform floor	Side platform, the doors are opened on the right side	
Platform floor	Line 1	← (Duren Kalibata) Bogor Line to Jakarta Kota
Platform floor	Line 2	Bogor Line to Bogor or Nambo (Pasar Minggu) →
Platform floor	Side platform, the doors are opened on the right side	
G	Main building	

== Services ==
The following is a list of train services at the Pasar Minggu Baru Station

=== Passenger services ===
- KAI Commuter
  - Bogor Line, to Jakarta Kota and Bogor
  - Bogor Line (Nambo branch), to Jakarta Kota and Nambo

== Supporting transportation ==
Public transport type	Line	Destination
Angkot (share taxis)	S05	Pasar Minggu Terminal–Rawajati

Preceding station	Kereta Api Indonesia	Following station
Duren Kalibata towards Manggarai	Manggarai–Padalarang	Pasar Minggu towards Padalarang
