= KAI Commuter Bogor Line =

Commuter rail line

Bogor Commuter Line Bogor Line
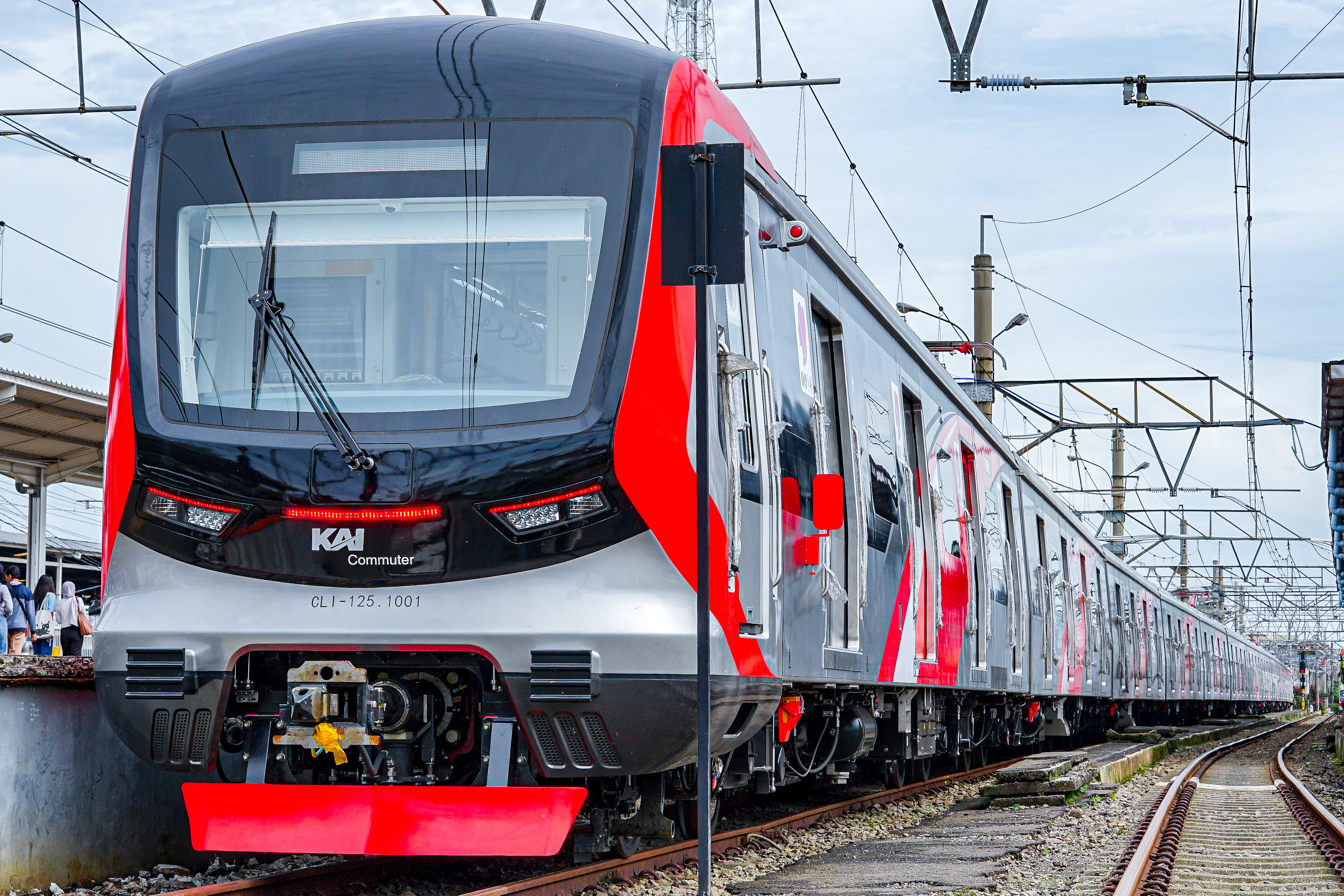
- SFC120-V Series Trainset 1 in Bogor railway station

Overview
- Status: Operational
- Owner: Kereta Api Indonesia
- Locale: West Jakarta; Central Jakarta; South Jakarta; Depok; Bogor Regency; Bogor
- Termini: Jakarta Kota; Bogor Nambo Manggarai Depok (some services)
- Stations: 26
- Website: www.krl.co.id

Service
- Type: Commuter rail
- System: KRL Commuterline
- Services: 2
- Operator: KAI Commuter
- Depot(s): Depok (DP); Bogor (BOO); Bukit Duri (BUD); Manggarai (MRI)
- Rolling stock: 205 series Tokyo Metro 6000 series SFC120-V Series; CLI-225 series

History
- Opened: 1930

Technical
- Line length: Jakarta Kota - Bogor; 54.8 km (34.1 mi); Jakarta Kota - Nambo; 51.033 km (31.710 mi)
- Number of tracks: Double-track (Jakarta Kota-Bogor) Single-track (Citayam-Nambo)
- Character: At-grade, Elevated
- Track gauge: 1,067 mm (3 ft 6 in)
- Electrification: 1,500 V DC overhead line
- Operating speed: 80 km/h (50 mph)

The Bogor Line (formerly known as Central Line, also known as KRL Commuter Line Jakarta Kota–Bogor/Nambo), officially the Bogor Commuter Line, is a commuter rail line in Indonesia, operated by PT Kereta Commuter Indonesia (KCI). The line connects Jakarta Kota station in West Jakarta and Bogor station in Bogor, West Java. On maps and diagrams, the line is shown using the color "red" ( ). The line is the busiest in the KA Commuter system.

The Bogor Line was the second electrified rail line to be built, after Tanjung Priuk–Jatinegara line. Until May 2022, the elevated tracks and stations between Jakarta Kota and Manggarai are shared with the Cikarang Line, whereas the ground tracks and stations between Manggarai and Bogor are shared with the Loop Line.

After a planned switchover at Manggarai on 27 May 2022, the line was renamed as Bogor Line with new abbreviation (B). Before the renaming, it was named as the Central Line with the abbreviation (C) on system maps until May 2022. The former abbreviation would be later used for the Cikarang Loop Line. It absorbed Nambo branch line from the deactivated Loop Line.

== Route patterns ==
There are four main service patterns of the line. Three serve patterns serve the main Bogor branch of the line and one another serves the Nambo branch.

=== Bogor branch line ===
Service pattern	Route	Listed as	Stations served
Jakarta Kota–Bogor	Towards Bogor: Jakarta Kota → Manggarai → Depok → Citayam → Bogor; Towards Jakarta Kota: Bogor → Citayam → Depok → Manggarai → Jakarta Kota	Towards Bogor: "Bogor"; Towards Jakarta Kota: "Jakarta Kota"	8 stations from Jakarta Kota to Manggarai (excluding Gambir, bidirectional); 12 stations from Tebet to Depok (bidirectional); 4 stations from Citayam to Bogor (bidirectional)
Jakarta Kota–Depok	Towards Depok: Jakarta Kota → Manggarai → Depok; Towards Jakarta Kota: Depok → Manggarai → Jakarta Kota	Towards Depok: "Depok"; Towards Jakarta Kota: "Jakarta Kota"	8 stations from Jakarta Kota to Manggarai (excluding Gambir, bidirectional); 12 stations from Tebet to Depok (bidirectional)
Manggarai –Bogor	Towards Bogor: Manggarai → Depok → Citayam → Bogor; Towards Manggarai: Bogor → Citayam → Depok → Manggarai	Towards Bogor: "Bogor"; Towards Manggarai: "Manggarai"	13 stations from Manggarai to Depok (bidirectional); 4 stations from Citayam to Bogor (bidirectional)

=== Nambo branch line ===
This branch runs every 60-120 minutes and has a fixed schedule.

Service pattern	Route	Listed as	Stations served
Jakarta Kota–Nambo	Towards Nambo: Jakarta Kota → Manggarai → Depok → Citayam → Nambo; Towards Jakarta Kota: Nambo → Citayam → Depok → Manggarai → Jakarta Kota	Towards Nambo: "Nambo"; Towards Jakarta Kota: "Jakarta Kota"	8 stations from Jakarta Kota to Manggarai (excluding Gambir, bidirectional); 12 stations from Tebet to Depok (bidirectional); 4 stations from Citayam to Nambo (bidirectional)

== Stations ==
Station		Distance (km)		Transfers/notes		Location	
Code	Name	From previous station	From Jakarta Termini	Transfers/notes		Location	
Core section: From top to bottom (downwards) towards Bogor or Nambo; from bottom to top (upwards) towards Jakarta Kota
B01 TP01	Jakarta Kota	-	0.0	KA Commuter Line Jakarta Kota–Tanjung Priok	Terminal station. Interchange station to Kota (U/C) Kota	West Jakarta	Jakarta
B02	Jayakarta	1.4	1.4			West Jakarta	Jakarta
B03	Mangga Besar	1.0	3.4			West Jakarta	Jakarta
B04	Sawah Besar	1.1	4.5			Central Jakarta	Jakarta
B05	Juanda	0.7	5.2		Juanda	Central Jakarta	Jakarta
B06	Gambir			Pass-through (train does not stop here, reopening soon)		Central Jakarta	Jakarta
B07	Gondangdia	2.2	7.4		Kebon Sirih (planned)	Central Jakarta	Jakarta
B08	Cikini	1.7	9.1			Central Jakarta	Jakarta
B09 C13 A01	Manggarai	1.6	10.7	KAI Commuter Cikarang Loop Line Soekarno–Hatta Airport Rail Link	Some trains terminate here Interchange station to or Manggarai (U/C) Manggarai Manggarai Manggarai Bus Terminal (via short walk)	South Jakarta	Jakarta
B10	Tebet	2.6	13.3			South Jakarta	Jakarta
B11	Cawang	1.3	14.6		Cikoko Cikoko	South Jakarta	Jakarta
B12	Duren Kalibata	1.4	16.0			South Jakarta	Jakarta
B13	Pasar Minggu Baru	1.5	17.5			South Jakarta	Jakarta
B14	Pasar Minggu	1.7	19.2		Pasar Minggu Bus Terminal (via short walk)	South Jakarta	Jakarta
B15	Tanjung Barat	3.0	22.2		Tanjung Barat (planned)	South Jakarta	Jakarta
B16	Lenteng Agung	2.4	24.8			South Jakarta	Jakarta
B17	Universitas Pancasila	1.0	25.8			South Jakarta	Jakarta
B18	Universitas Indonesia	2.2	28.0			Depok	West Java
B19	Pondok Cina	1.1	29.1			Depok	West Java
B20	Depok Baru	2.5	31.6		Depok Bus Terminal (via short walk) K1 Terminal Depok	Depok	West Java
B21	Depok	1.7	33.3		Some trains terminate here	Depok	West Java
B22	Citayam	5.0	38.3		Branch intersection between Bogor and Nambo branch lines	Depok	West Java
Towards Bogor heads straight to Bojong Gede
Towards Nambo heads straight to Pondok Rajeg
Bogor branch section: From top to bottom (downwards) towards Bogor; from bottom to top (upwards) towards Jakarta Kota
Towards Jakarta Kota heads straight to Citayam
B23	Bojong Gede	5.2	43.5		Bojong Gede Terminal (via short walk)	Bogor Regency	West Java
B24	Cilebut	4.3	47.8			Bogor Regency	West Java
B25	Sukaresmi			Planned		Bogor	West Java
B26	Bogor	7.5	54.8	Pangrango (train)	Terminal station Interchange station to (via Bogor Paledang by skywalk) K2 Stasiun Bogor K5 Stasiun Bogor 1	Bogor	West Java
Nambo branch section: From top to bottom (downwards) towards Nambo; from bottom to top (upwards) towards Jakarta Kota
Towards Jakarta Kota heads straight to Citayam
b23	Pondok Rajeg	3.3	41.5			Depok	West Java
b24	Cibinong	3.2	44.7		Cibinong Bus Terminal (via 10-minute walk)	Bogor Regency	West Java
b25	Gunung Putri			Planned to be under reconstruction		Bogor Regency	West Java
b26	Nambo	6.3	51.0		Terminal station	Bogor Regency	West Java

=== Proposed extension ===
Ministry of Transportation have attempted to examine the possibility of extending the line beyond Bogor towards Sukabumi. In February 2021, a tender for feasibility study for Bogor–Lido (near Cigombong station) track electrification was announced by Jabodetabek Transportation Authority on the ministry's e-procurement website. In May 2021, a regional office of the ministry posted an update to existing Bogor–Sukabumi double-tracking project, mentioning the possibility of KRL Commuterline extension to Sukabumi.

=== Proposed plan to stop at Gambir ===
Currently, Gambir station does not serve Commuterline trains because it is specialised as a terminus for intercity trains on all of its platforms and does not have any electronic money gates. In June 2022, Ministry of Transportation announces that starting in 2025, intercity trains will terminate at the newly-refurbished Manggarai station on specialised platforms which means Gambir will cease its service of intercity trains and start serving Commuterline trains. Gambir will be the second-largest station of Bogor Line after Manggarai and the only one on the line with elevated track that has more than two platforms.

== Rolling stock ==
Present:

- Ex-JR East 205 series

(2013–present)

- Ex-Tokyo Metro 6000 series

(2011–present)

- SFC120-V Series

(2025–present)

- iE305 series

(2025–present)

Past:

- Ex-Toei 6000 series

(2000-2016)

- Ex-JR East 103 series

(2004-2016)

- Ex-Tokyu 8000 series

(2006-2024)

- Ex-Tokyu 8500 series

(2006-2025)

- Ex-Tokyo Metro 5000 series

(2007-2020)

- Ex-Tōyō Rapid 1000 series

(2007-2019)

- Ex-Tokyo Metro 05 series

(2010-2025)

- Ex-JR East 203 series

(2011-2025)

- Ex-Tokyo Metro 7000 series

(2011-2025)

== Incidents and accidents ==
- On 18 June 2011, during the trial for the new Commuterline services, an angry passenger threw stones at a former Tokyu 8500 series trainset number 8613F on idle at Jakarta Kota station, damaging its crucial components, because he was confused by the new train system.
- On Thursday, October 4, 2012, a former Tokyo Metro 05 series trainset (no. 05-007F) travelling as KA 435 derailed on a switch before Cilebut station, with the third car impacted station platform's end. No fatal injury reported, the whole trainset was later written off due to damage beyond repair.
- 23 September 2015 – Two electric trains (former 205 series trainset no. 205-54F and 205-123F) travelling as KA 1154 and KA 1156 (both serving Central line, Bogor-bound) were involved in a rear-end collision at Juanda Station. No one was killed, but 42 passengers were hurt, with some required intensive treatment. Some cars involved returned to service combined in trainset 205-54F, while the rest was written off
- On June 16, 2023, a JR 205 train collided with angkot that stuck in an unguarded railway crossing intersection in Citayam, Depok, West Java. No injuries were occurred (although only the angkot and JR 205 that has minor damage) and the unguarded railway crossing intersection were subsequently tore down.

=== Pre-2011 route and services reform ===
- 20 September 1968, an Economy local train hauled by class 3200 electric locomotive travelling as KA 406 to Bogor collided with another economy train (KA 309) to Jakarta near Ratu Jaya, Depok. 46 deaths and 115 injuries reported. The crash was attributed to malfunctioning indicator in the signaling system as well as lack of verification by the dispatcher.
- 2 November 1993, two Economy train, both of Rheostatic EMU class from 1976 and 1980s batch, running this line were involved in a head on collision near Ratu Jaya, Depok around 07:30 am during the morning rush hour. 20 people were killed, including drivers of both trains, and further 100 was injured. Being the same type, 4 surviving cars from both side were combined, colloquially known as CatDog trainset due to their different body type. The rest were written off. This accident prompted the government to start double-tracking project of the Depok-Bogor segment of the line.
- 4 October 2003, KRL Holec KL3-97242F travelling as KA 490 (Economy) bound for Bogor collided with the rear end of a fellow KRL Holec train KL3-94212F traveling as KA 488 (Economy) also bound for Jakarta Kota on this line between Cilebut and Bogor stations. 39 people were injured.
- 12 December 2003, a KRL Rheostatic trainset KL3-76112F set in idle position on Bogor station prepared for KA 459 (Economy) slid uncommanded down the line all the way until stopped by the steeper upward climb of the Manggarai-Cikini elevated track. Further investigation proved the trainset was not secured enough to prevent it to slide away from idle position.
- 30 June 2005, KRL Rheostatic KL3-76110F travelling as KA 583 (Economy) from Bogor bound for Jakarta Kota collided with the rear end of a KRL Holec trainset KL3-2000202F traveling as KA 585 (Economy) on the same line between Tanjung Barat and Pasar Minggu stations. 5 deaths and 113 injuries reported.
- 2 January 2007, KA 241 (Economy) running on Bojong Gede-Jakarta Kota sector derailed while reaching track 10 of Jakarta Kota terminus station, no casualty reported.
- 5 June 2009, KRL Holec travelling as KA 521 (Economy) bound for Jakarta Kota collided with the rear end of a former Toyo Rapid 1000 series trainset traveling as KA 265 (Express) on this line between Tebet and Manggarai stations.
- 4 August 2009 – Former Toei 6000 series trainset no. 6151F traveling as KA 211 (Express) collided with the rear end of KRL Holec KL3-97234F travelling as KA 549 (Economy) on this line between Bogor and Cilebut stations. Assistant driver and a technician on board KA 211 was killed. Some cars from KA 211 involved returned to service redistributed to other trainsets, including 6181F (involved in other accident) and shortened 4-car 6151F well until Commuterline era, while the rest (including the Holec trainset) was written off
