= Bir pletok =

Indonesian traditional drink

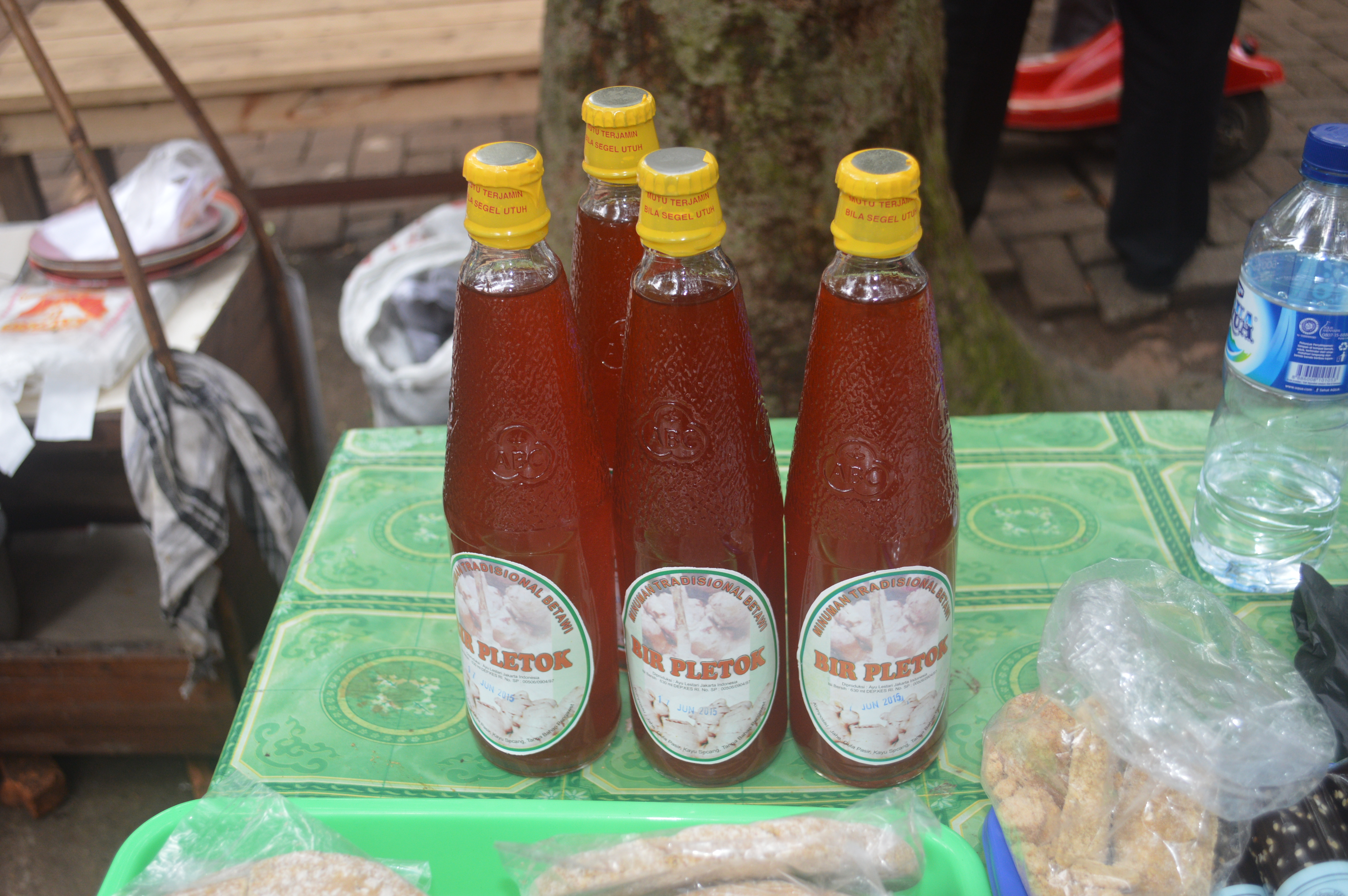
- Course: Beverage
- Place of origin: Indonesia
- Region or state: Jakarta
- Serving temperature: Hot
- Main ingredients: ginger, pandan leaves, lemongrass

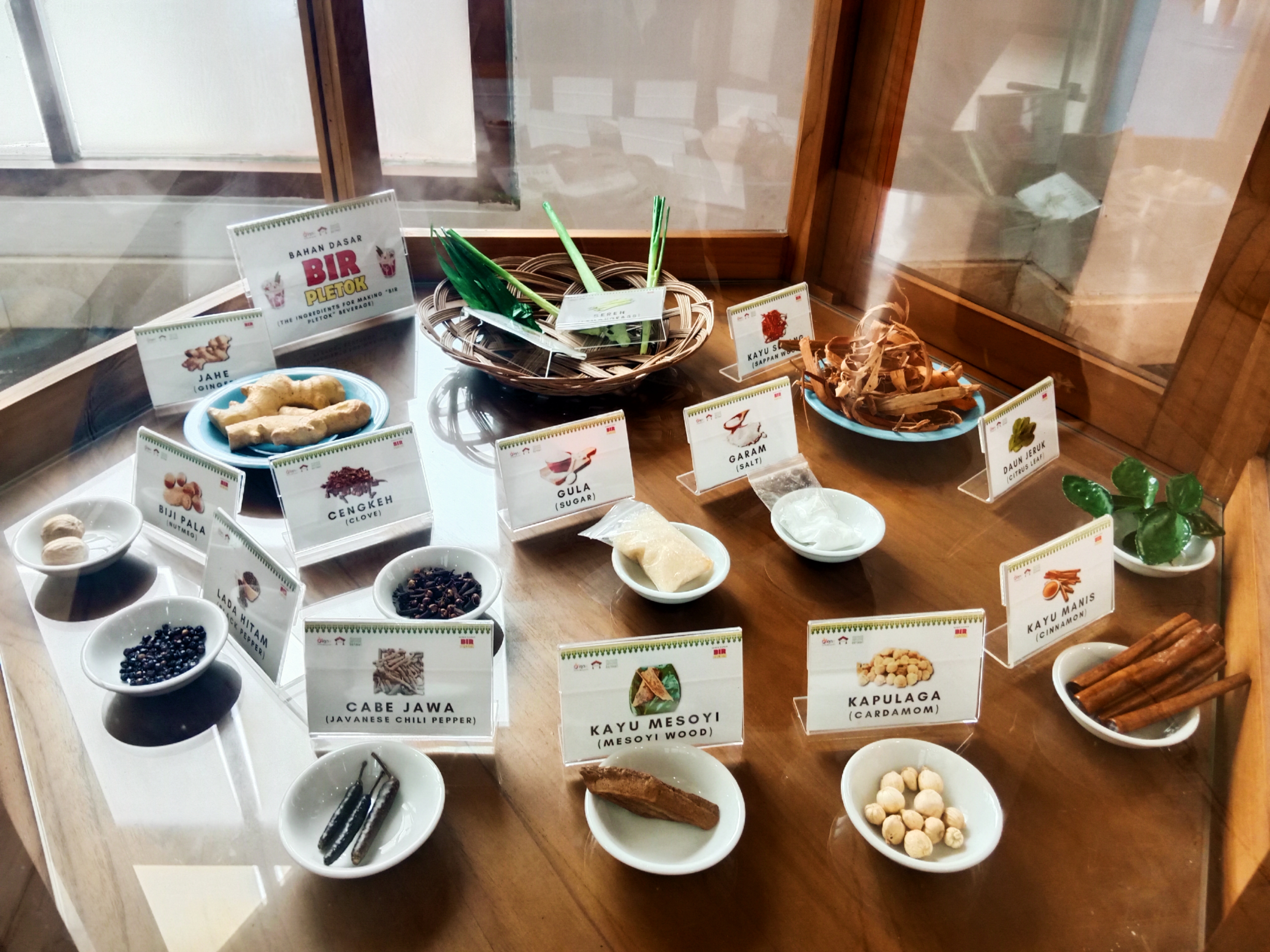
The many spices used as ingredients in bir pletok, displayed at the Betawi Museum, Jakarta.

Bir pletok is a non-alcoholic Indonesian drink of the Betawi people in Jakarta, Indonesia. Pletok beer is made from several spices, namely ginger, pandan leaves, boiled sappan wood, and lemongrass.

Bir pletok is mostly found in Indonesia and is considered a genuine Betawinese drink.

Most lagers are alcoholic and are known to have negative health effects but, despite being referred to as a "beer", Pletok does not contain alcohol.

The drink is inspired by the Dutch colonists that brought new traditions to Batavia; one being drinking alcoholic drinks late at night. The nearby individuals of Betawi made their own particular home-made, alcohol-free brew, since a large portion of Betawi individuals were Muslim, for whom alcohol consumption is forbidden.

== See also ==
- List of Indonesian drinks
