= Universitas Indonesia railway station =

Railway station in Indonesia

B18 Universitas Indonesia Station Stasiun Universitas Indonesia
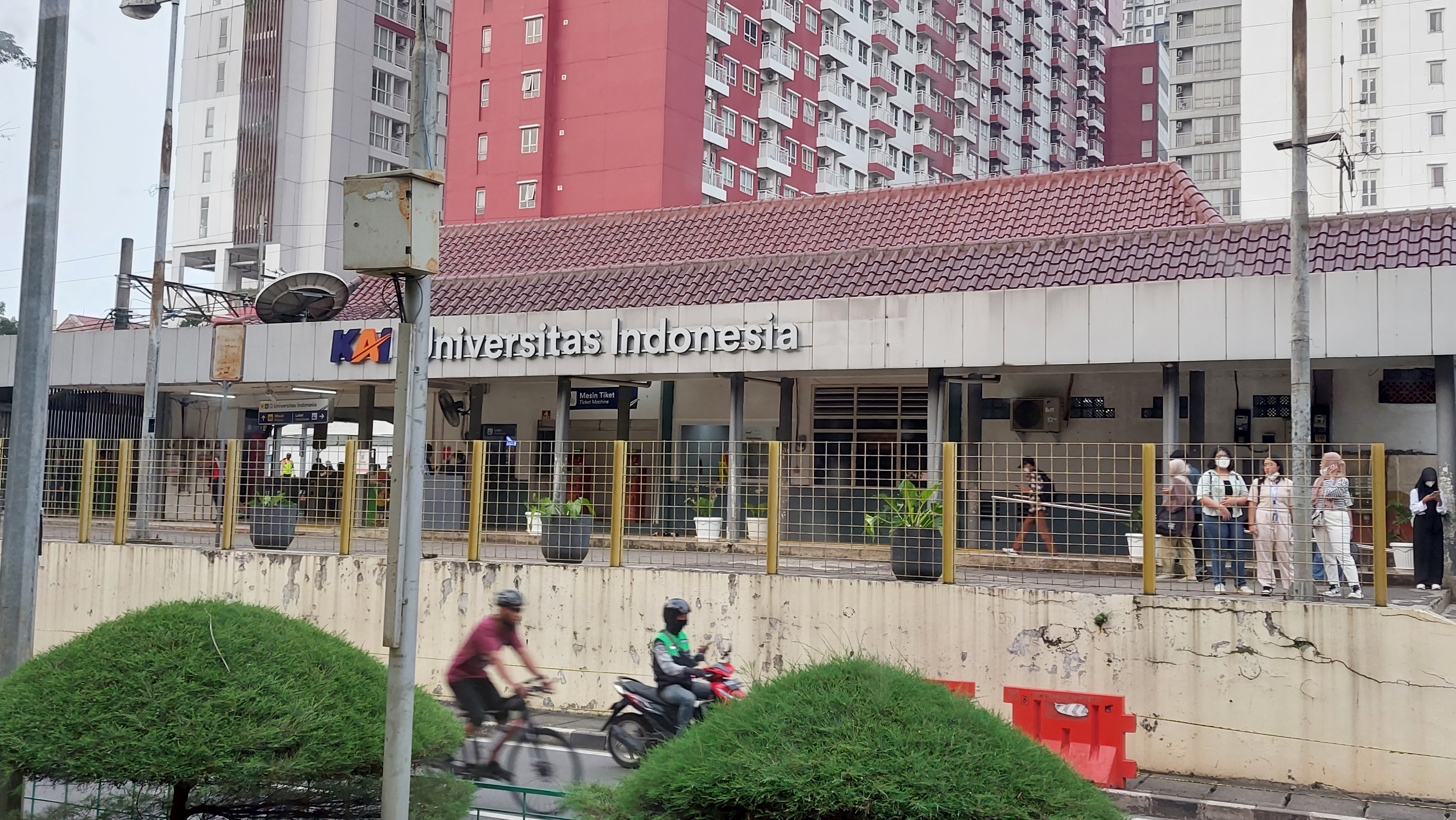
- Entrance of the Universitas Indonesia Station

General information
- Location: Jl. Lingkar Utara UI, Pondok Cina, Beji, Depok; West Java; Indonesia
- Coordinates: 6.360754099999999°S 106.8317481°E
- Elevation: +69 m (226 ft)
- Owner: Kereta Api Indonesia
- Operator: KAI Commuter
- Lines: Manggarai–Padalarang railway; Bogor Line
- Platforms: 2 side platforms
- Tracks: 2

Construction
- Structure type: Ground
- Parking: Unavailable
- Accessible: Available

Other information
- Station code: UI
- Classification: Class I

Services
Preceding station		Following station
Universitas Pancasila towards Jakarta Kota	Commuter Line Bogor	Pondok Cina towards Bogor or Nambo
Location
- Location within Depok

Universitas Indonesia Station (UI) is a railway station located in Pondok Cina, Beji, Depok, West Java, Indonesia. The station is located on the eastern perimeter of University of Indonesia complex, between Pondok Cina Station and Universitas Pancasila Station. This station is one of two railway stations serving University of Indonesia along with Pondok Cina Station, about 1 kilometer to the south which is located closer to the university rectorate building.

KRL Commuterline passenger at the station are dominated by the University of Indonesia students and local people who live around the campus area. Its position inside the campus environment causes the frequency of crowds inside the station to be seen only during the hours of entering and leaving the office/campus. Unlike the stations located on the Manggarai-Depok route, whose canopy forms the letter Y, the canopy for UI Station (and also Tebet Station) forms the letter T.

Since 1 August 2019 Universitas Indonesia Station, together with Sudirman, Palmerah, Cikini, and Taman Kota Stations, officially abolished the sale of single trip cards (Guaranteed Daily Tickets/Tiket Harian Berjaminan or THB) for KRL Commuterline passengers. This is due to the majority of KRL Commuterline passengers are used to using multi-trip cards and electronic money. In this way, long queues to buy KRL tickets can be cut. However, service users can still tap-in/tap-out with THB at the station.

== Building and layout ==
Universitas Indonesia Station has two railway tracks.

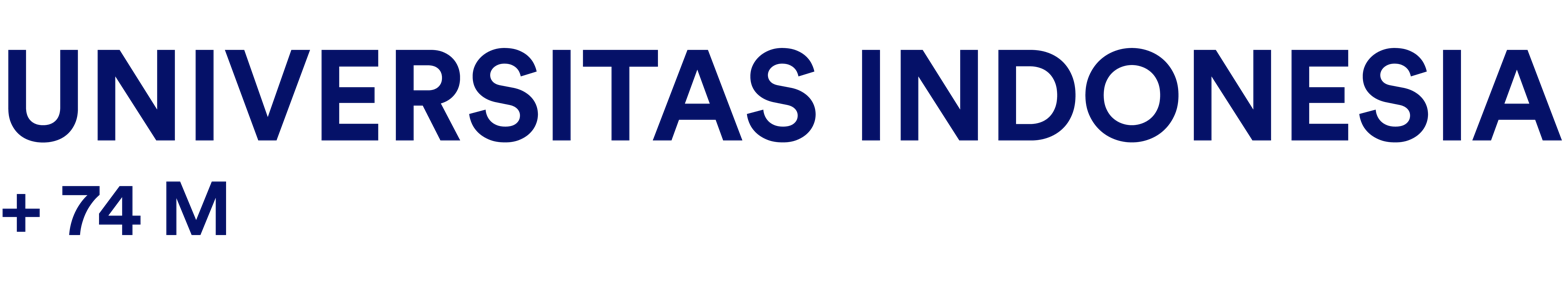
B18
Platform floor	Side platform, the doors are opened on the right side	
Platform floor	Line 2	← (Universitas Pancasila) Bogor Line to Jakarta Kota
Platform floor	Line 1	Bogor Line to Bogor or Nambo (Pondok Cina) →
Platform floor	Side platform, the doors are opened on the right side	
G	Main building	

== Services ==
The following is a list of train services at the Universitas Indonesia Station.

=== Passenger services ===
- KAI Commuter
  - Bogor Line, to Jakarta Kota and Bogor
  - Bogor Line (Nambo branch), to Jakarta Kota and Nambo

== Supporting transportation ==
About 50 meters from the station there is a bus stop for the Yellow Bus, a transportation on the University of Indonesia's campus for transportation between faculties.

Public transport type	Line	Destination
TransJakarta	4B	University of Indonesia-Manggarai Station (transit using the Yellow Bus first)
TransJakarta	D21	University of Indonesia-Lebak Bulus Grab Station
DAMRI	Intermodal Bus Soekarno–Hatta International Airport	University of Indonesia-Soekarno–Hatta International Airport

== Incidents ==
- On 22 December 2008 at around 14.08 WIB, a 14-year-old boy was electrocuted by overhead line (LAA) on the roof of KRL with train number KA 456 bound for Jakarta Kota, the incident took place between Universitas Indonesia Station and Universitas Pancasila Station. The KRL trip was delayed for up to 30 minutes due to the overhead line blackout from Universitas Indonesia Station to Tanjung Barat Station to evacuate the victim's body, and was immediately taken to the authorities.
- On 15 October 2010 at around 07.00 WIB, a 12 year old boy was electrocuted by overhead line current (LAA) on the roof of the Economy KRL while the train was stopping at Universitas Indonesia Station bound for Jakarta Kota. As a result of this incident, a number of KRL trips that passed this station were delayed because the Economy KRL on which the child was traveling (bound for Jakarta Kota) could not depart because the victim's body had only been evacuated 20 minutes later to the Indonesian National Police Hospital in Kramat Jati, East Jakarta.
- On 11 April 2015 at 18:00 WIB, a tree fell in the area of the University of Indonesia Station and destroyed the side of the platform and made the KRL lines impassable, a number of KRL series from the direction of Jakarta or Bogor were delayed for more than two hours, especially the trip to Bogor with train numbers 1184, 1188, 1628, 1192. The route can only be traversed again at 20.30 WIB.

Preceding station	Kereta Api Indonesia	Following station
Universitas Pancasila towards Manggarai	Manggarai–Padalarang	Pondok Cina towards Padalarang
