= Pasar Minggu railway station =

Railway station in Indonesia

B14 Pasar Minggu Station Stasiun Pasar Minggu
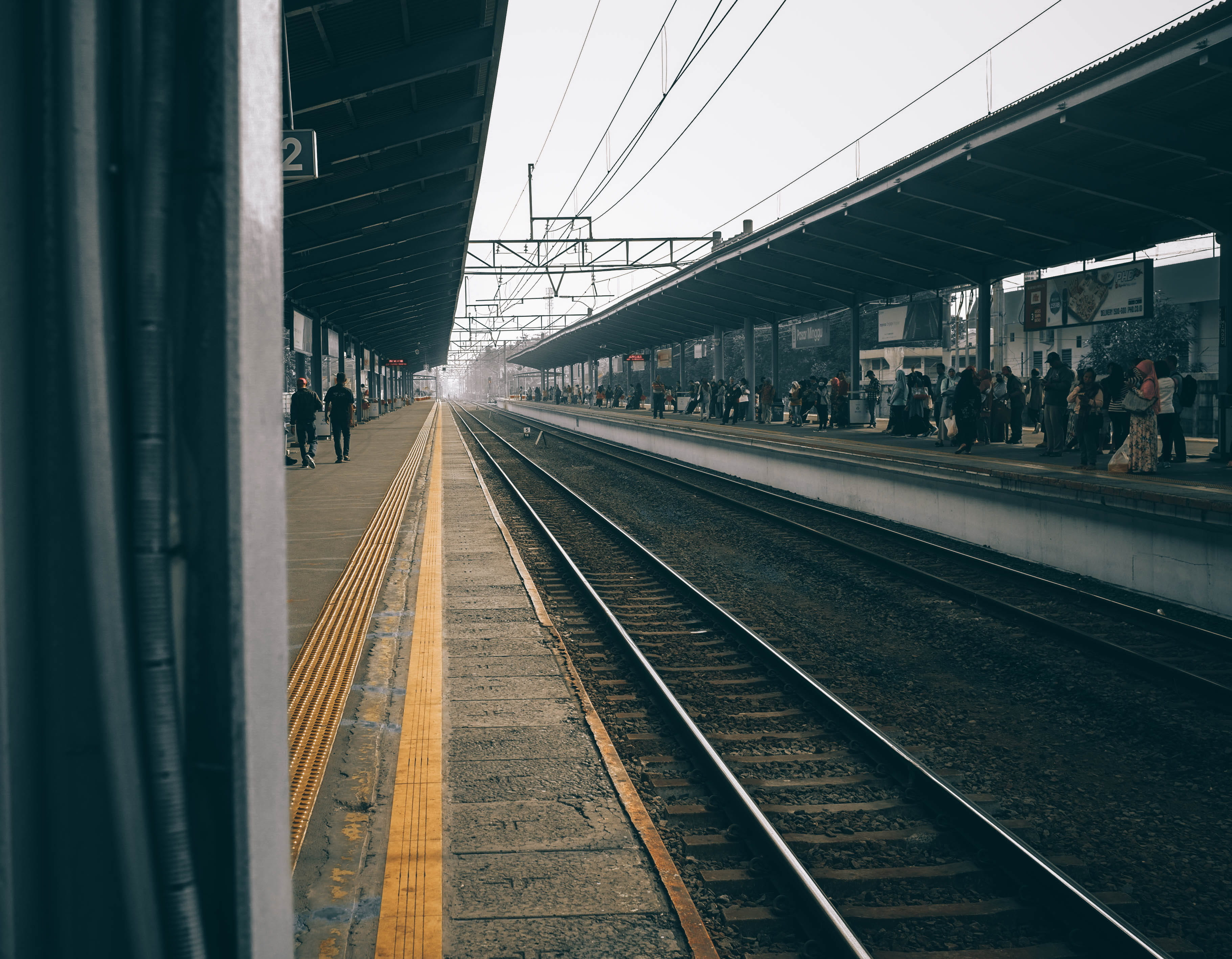
- The platform of the Pasar Minggu station

General information
- Location: Jl. Raya Pasar Minggu, Pasar Minggu, Pasar Minggu, South Jakarta; Jakarta; Indonesia
- Coordinates: 6.2828°S 106.8449°E
- Elevation: +36 m (118 ft)
- Owner: Kereta Api Indonesia
- Operator: KAI Commuter
- Lines: Manggarai–Padalarang railway; Bogor Line
- Platforms: 2 island platforms
- Tracks: 4

Construction
- Structure type: Ground
- Parking: Available
- Accessible: Available

Other information
- Station code: PSM

History
- Opened: 1873
- Rebuilt: 1988
- Electrified: 6 April 1925

Services
Preceding station		Following station
Pasar Minggu Baru towards Jakarta Kota	Commuter Line Bogor	Tanjung Barat towards Bogor or Nambo
Location
- Location within Jakarta

Pasar Minggu Station (PSM) (Indonesian: Stasiun Pasar Minggu) is a railway station in Pasar Minggu, Pasar Minggu, South Jakarta. The station, which is located at an altitude of +36 meters, is included in the Operation Area I Jakarta and only serves the KRL Commuterline route.

At the front of this station, there is a new pedestrian bridge that connects the station with the Robinson department store. The pedestrian bridge is equipped with an elevator, to ease disabled people to use the pedestrian bridge. Apart from the KRL that passes at Pasar Minggu station, cement and coal transport trains also pass here.

Pasar Minggu Station now has a pedestrian tunnel to ease passengers to cross to the platform next to it. Near the Pasar Minggu Lama Station there is the PJL 19 crossing. The crossing connects the road from Condet to Tanjung Barat and Jatipadang or from the opposite direction.

== Building and layout ==
This station has four railway lines. Line 2 is used for a straight line towards Bogor, while line 3 is used for a straight line towards Manggarai. Lines 1 and 4 are used as turnstiles for overtaking between trains. This station has had its platform extended to accommodate the KRL series which consists of 12 train series. During the Perumka era, this station had 2 access points (the other one was on the north side), but after the platform was extended, the north access door was closed, causing access to this station only on the south side, in the main station building.

B14 Pasar Minggu
P Platform floor	Line 4	← (Pasar Minggu Baru) Bogor Line to Jakarta Kota
P Platform floor	Island platform, the doors are opened on the right side of the train arrival on line 3, or on the left side of the train arrival on line 4
P Platform floor	Line 3	← (Pasar Minggu Baru) Bogor Line to Jakarta Kota
P Platform floor	Line 2	Bogor Line to Bogor or Nambo (Tanjung Barat) →
P Platform floor	Island platform, the doors are opened on the right side of the train arrival on line 2, or on the left side of the train arrival on line 1
P Platform floor	Line 1	Bogor Line to Bogor or Nambo (Tanjung Barat) →
G	Main building

== Services ==
The following is a list of train services at the Pasar Minggu Station

=== Passenger services ===
- KAI Commuter
  - Bogor Line, to Jakarta Kota and Bogor
  - Bogor Line (Nambo branch), to Jakarta Kota and Nambo

== Supporting transportation ==
Public transport type	Line	Destination
Angkot	D129	Tugu–Pasar Minggu Terminal
Angkot	D61	Limo–Pasar Minggu Terminal
Koperasi Wahana Kalpika (KWK)	S05	Pasar Minggu Terminal–Rawajati
Koperasi Wahana Kalpika (KWK)	S11	Pasar Minggu Terminal–Lebak Bulus Terminal
Koperasi Wahana Kalpika (KWK)	S15	Pasar Minggu Terminal–Cijantung
Koperasi Wahana Kalpika (KWK)	S15A	Ragunan Zoo–Pinang Ranti Terminal
Mikrolet	M16	Pasar Minggu Terminal–Kampung Melayu Terminal
Mikrolet	M17	Pasar Minggu Terminal-Pasar Lenteng Agung
Mikrolet	M17A	Pasar Minggu Terminal-Jagakarsa (via Kebagusan)
Mikrolet	M20	Pasar Minggu Terminal-Ciganjur
Mikrolet	M36	Pasar Minggu Terminal-Jagakarsa (via Ampera Raya)
Miniarta	M03	Depok Terminal–Pasar Minggu Terminal
Miniarta	M04	Abadijaya–Pasar Minggu Terminal
Kopaja	614	Pasar Minggu Terminal-Cipulir
Kopaja	616	Blok M Terminal-Cipedak
MetroMini	62	Pasar Minggu Terminal-Manggarai Terminal
MetroMini	75	Pasar Minggu Terminal–Blok M Terminal
MetroMini	640	Pasar Minggu Terminal-Tanah Abang Station
DAMRI		Pasar Minggu Terminal–Soekarno–Hatta International Airport
Transjakarta	4B	Manggarai Station-University of Indonesia (integrated with corridors
Transjakarta	6T	Pasar Minggu–Velbak (integrated with corridor)
Transjakarta	6U	Blok M–Pasar Minggu via Mampang (integrated with corridors 10H)
Transjakarta	9D	Pasar Minggu Terminal–Tanah Abang Station (integrated with corridors)
Transjakarta	9H	Blok M Terminal-Cipedak (integrated with corridors (4K) (10H) (13B)
Transjakarta	JAK 46 (Mikrotrans Jak Lingko)	Pasar Minggu Terminal-Ciganjur (via Kebagusan Raya)
Transjakarta	JAK 47 (Mikrotrans Jak Lingko)	Pasar Minggu Terminal-Ciganjur (integrated with corridors (4H), via Cilandak KKO)

Preceding station	Kereta Api Indonesia	Following station
Pasar Minggu Baru towards Manggarai	Manggarai–Padalarang	Tanjung Barat towards Padalarang
