= Pancasila University =

Indonesian university in Jakarta

- Universitas Pancasila
- Type: Private
- Established: 28 October 1966
- Rector: Prof. Dr. Wahono Sumaryono, Apt
- Location: Jakarta, Indonesia; 6.3398°S 106.8334°E
- Website: univpancasila.ac.id

Pancasila University (Indonesian: Universitas Pancasila) is a private university located in Jakarta, Indonesia. Its main campus is located in Jagakarsa, South Jakarta while its postgraduate campus is located in Menteng, Central Jakarta.

The university was founded in 1966, following the merger of the old Pancasila University (founded in 1963) and Bung Karno University. The university has produced in excess of 50,000 alumni, with an annual graduating class of over 1,500.

== History ==
The university was declared on 28 October 1966, following the merger of the older Pancasila University which was itself founded in 1963 and the Bung Karno University which was founded in 1964 (not to be mistaken with another identically named university founded in 1999), partially due to the pressure from the Suharto government against symbolism of the former president. Amir Murtono acted as the first rector of the university until 1978.

In 1985, it received a grant from the Indonesian Ministry of Education and Culture in form of 10,160 square meters of land in Menteng, Central Jakarta, and later on the university moved its undergraduate location to its newly constructed faculty of economics building in Jagakarsa on 1988.

On 2015, the university put forth a proposal to nationalize the university, claiming that they were willing to hand over Rp 40 trillion (US$3 billion) in assets to the government. However, the proposal fell out with the provost citing the lack of land in the university's possession as a primary cause. During the 50th anniversary of the university in 2016, 1,711 scholars graduated from the university, which had a total of 13,000 active students and over 52,000 alumni.

According to Tempo, the university's faculty of law is one of the favorites in Indonesia among other private universities such as Pelita Harapan University and Islamic University of Indonesia. The current rector is Wahono Sumaryono, who will serve until 2018.

== Faculties ==
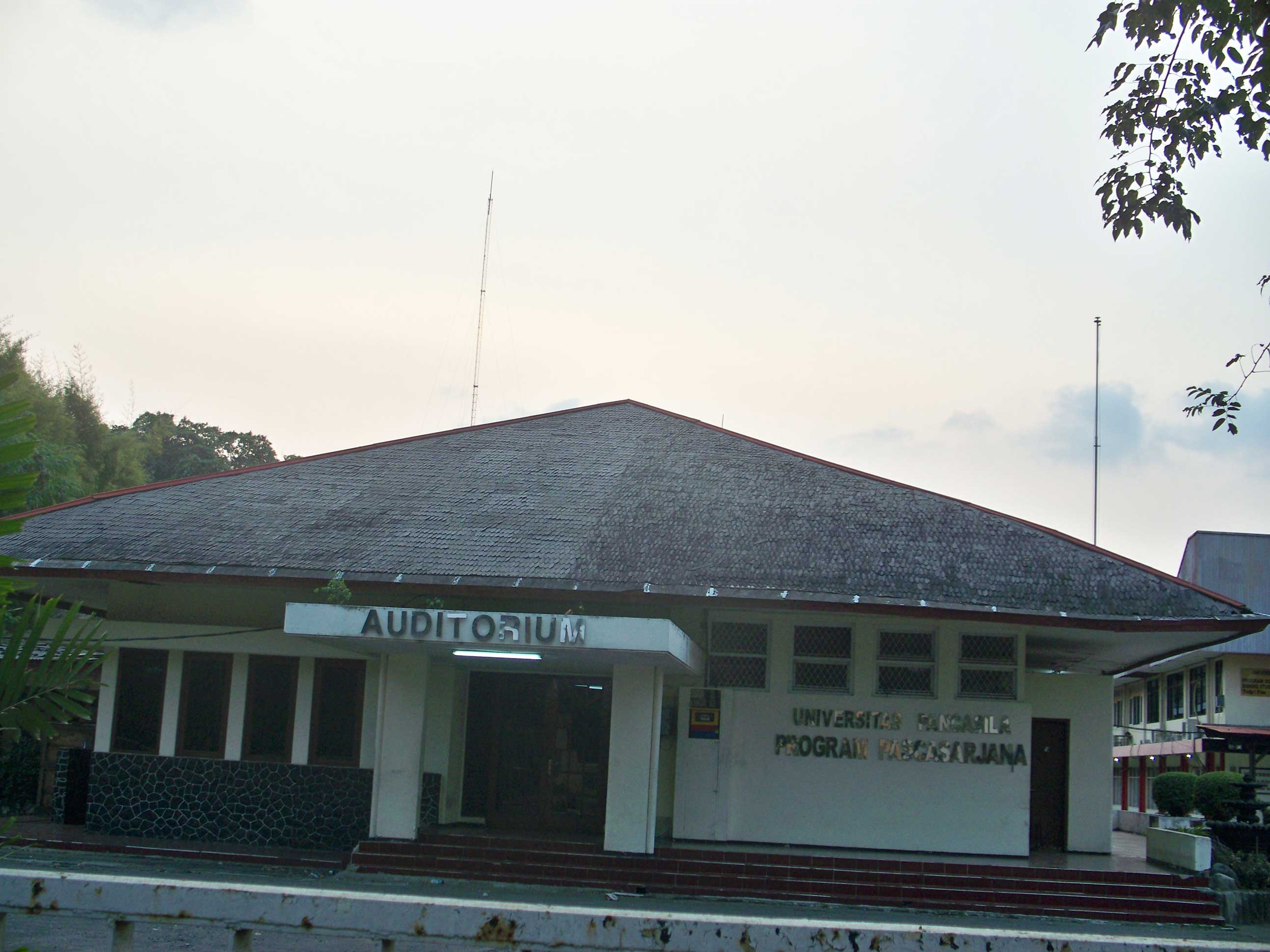
Postgraduate Auditorium in Central Jakarta.

St. Peter Catholic Church (Gereja Katolik Santo Petrus) within the main campus

Pancasila University offers the following undergraduate subjects, divided into seven faculties:

1. Faculty of Economics and Business
  - Accounting
  - Management
  - Accounting (Diploma only)
  - Taxation (Diploma only)
2. Faculty of Law
3. Faculty of Pharmacy
  - Pharmacy (Diploma, Bachelor, Masters, Doctoral, Pharmacist Profession)
4. Faculty of Engineering
  - Architecture
  - Information Engineering
  - Civil Engineering
  - Electrical Engineering
  - Mechanical Engineering
  - Industrial Engineering
5. Faculty of Psychology
6. Faculty of Communication
7. Faculty of Tourism

== See also ==
- Trisakti University
- Esa Unggul University
