= Jagakarsa =

District in South Jakarta, Indonesia

- District
- Interactive map of Jagakarsa
- Coordinates: 6°20′03″S 106°49′18″E
- Country: Indonesia
- Province: Jakarta
- Administrative city: South Jakarta

Area
  - Total: 24.87 km^{2} (9.60 sq mi)
- Elevation: 52 m (171 ft)

Population (2023)
  - Total: 383,420
  - Density: 15,417/km^{2} (39,930/sq mi)
- Time zone: UTC+7 (Asia/Jakarta)
- Postal code: 12530, 12610, 12620, 12630, 12640
- Area code: 021

Jagakarsa is the southernmost kecamatan or district in the administrative city of South Jakarta, Indonesia. Jagakarsa is bounded by Ciliwung River to the east, Krukut River to the west, and Margasatwa-Sagu-Joe-T.B.Simatupang-Poltangan Road to the north, while the boundary marches with Depok to the south.

As one of the southernmost districts of Jakarta, Jagakarsa has a relatively higher elevation (average 52-meter above sea level) and a cooler climate than the rest of Jakarta (average 25–27-degree Celsius). Jagakarsa has been allotted for water reservoir use, resulting in low footprint for buildings in Jagakarsa and high amount of green area.

== History ==
The oldest part of Jagakarsa formed part of the particuliere land or private domain of Tandjong West. Its first recorded owner was Jan Andries Duurkoop, who bought the estate from an unknown prior owner between 1760 and 1780. Duurkoop utilized the estate as grazing land where he kept about five thousand cattle heads, producing milk and meat for the growing urban settlement of Batavia (now Jakarta). Duurkoop died in 1792; and his widow, Johanna Adriana Christina Duurkoop, remarried to Conraag Johnas, then moved to Japan for the latter's military career. The couple later returned to Batavia, where Conraag Johnas died in 1803. The estate of Tandjong West was inherited by descendants of Johanna Adriana Christina Duurkoop in 1838.

By the early twentieth century, the estate of Tandjong West was owned by a company, N. V. Landbouw Maatschappij Tandjong West, headed by the prominent landlord ('landheer') Tan Liok Tiauw, of the late colonial period.

== Cultural significance ==
Jagakarsa contains the northern portion of the complex of University of Indonesia.

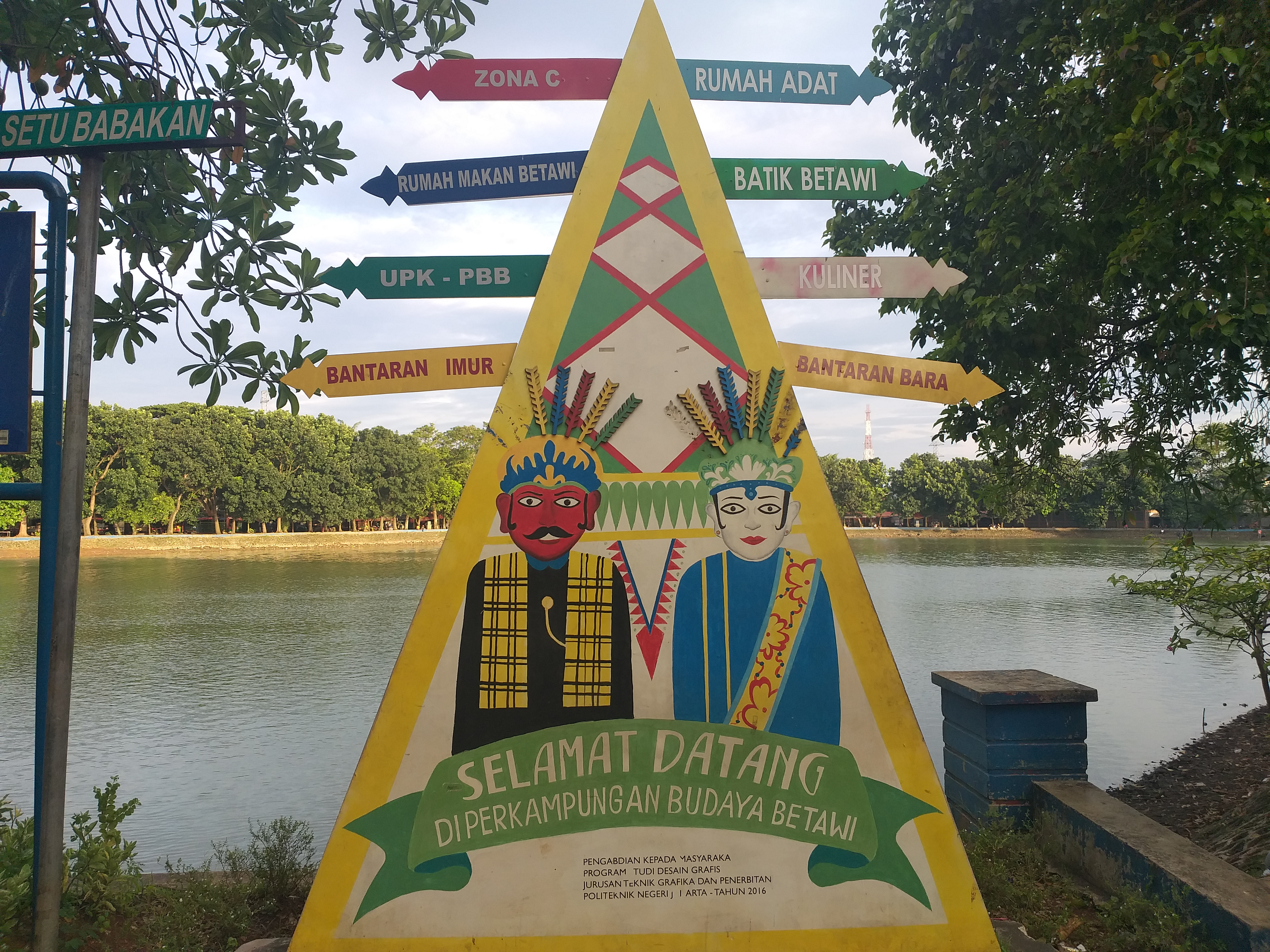
Welcome sign at Setu Babakan

The area is also strongly associated with the local Betawi culture of Jakarta, in particular local music. Various Betawi musical genres that thrive in Jagakarsa include Tanjidor, Tari Topeng, Wayang kulit, Gambus ensemble, and Gambang Kromong. Many Betawi kampungs in the locality are also famous for their rebana ensembles, including in the kelurahan or subdistrict of Jagakarsa, Lenteng Agung, and Tanjung Barat.

Lake Babakan and Lake Mangga Bolong are the largest water reservoirs in Jagakarsa, also functioning as recreation areas. Lake Babakan is particularly known for its Betawi people, who used the edges of the lake for fish-farming.

== Urban villages ==
The district of Jagakarsa is divided into six urban villages (kelurahan).

Name	Postal code	Area (km^{2})	Population [2023]
Tanjung Barat	12530	3.65	50,573
Lenteng Agung	12610	2.28	69,704
Jagakarsa	12620	4.85	82,363
Ciganjur	12630	3.51	51,672
Srengseng Sawah	12640	6.75	76,064
Cipedak	12630	3.97	52,044

== Transportation ==
The Bogor-Kota line of Jakarta Commuter rail passed through Jagakarsa District.

Rail access to the district is:

Railway line	Railway station
Manggarai-Bogor railway (operating)	Tanjung Barat
Manggarai-Bogor railway (operating)	Lenteng Agung
Manggarai-Bogor railway (operating)	Universitas Pancasila
Tebet-Serpong railway (planned)	Jagakarsa
Tebet-Serpong railway (planned)	Tanah Baru

== Landmarks ==
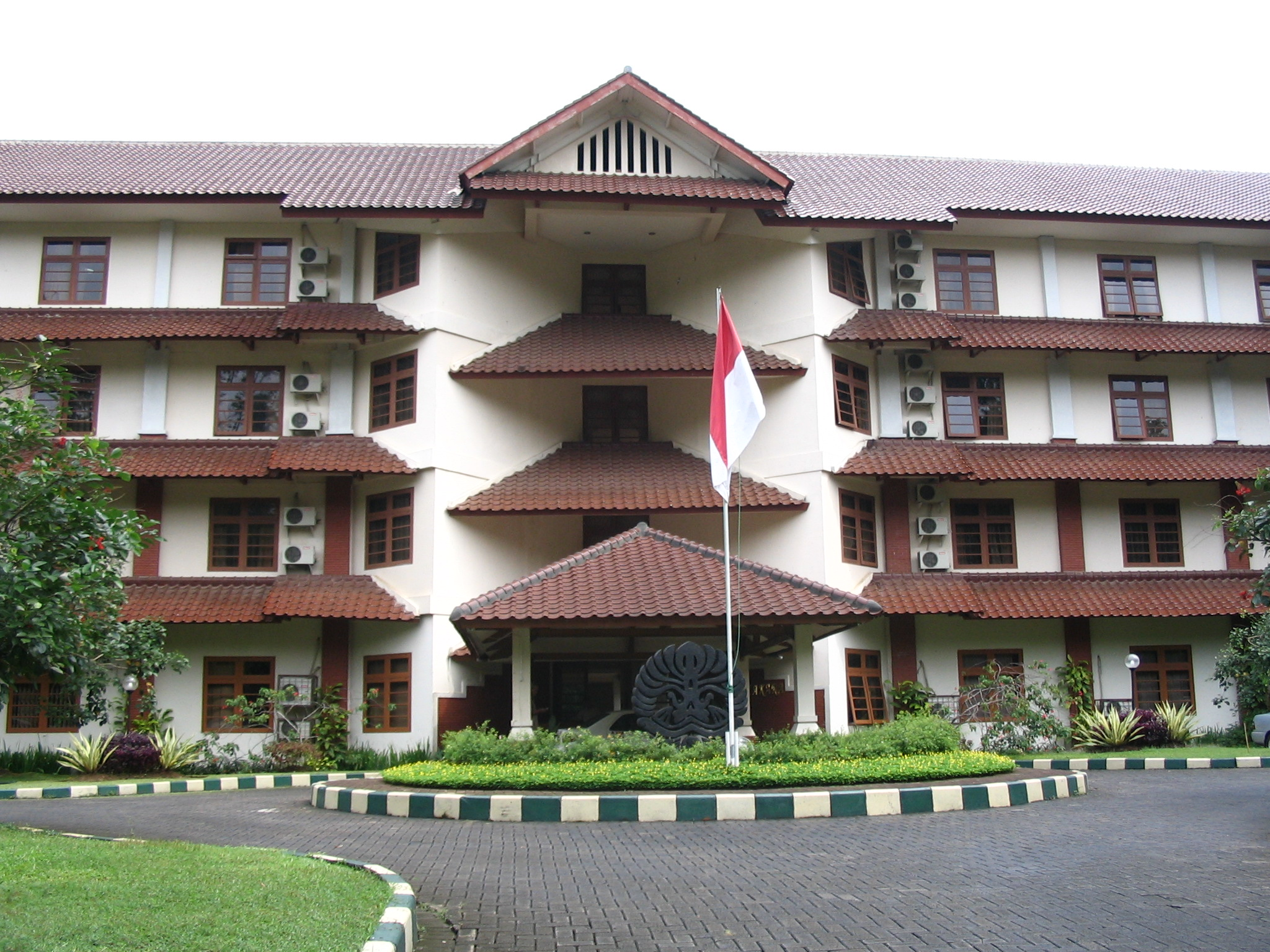
Wisma Makara or Makara Lodge, is a student meeting facility building situated in Jagakarsa Subdistrict, in the Jakarta side of the complex of University of Indonesia.

- ÆON Mall Tanjung Barat
- Defunct Rawa Bambu Railway Station. closed in 1996 because of the construction of Jakarta Outer Ring Road section Pondok Pinang – TMII.
- Lenteng Agung railway station
- National Science and Technology Institute
- Northern portion of University of Indonesia
- Pancasila University
- Setu Babakan or Lake Babakan
- Setu Mangga Bolong or Mangga Bolong Lake
- Tanjung Barat Tollgate
- Tanjung Barat railway station
- Tomb of Jagakarsa Prince. Tomb of the local Betawi heroes who defended the area during the 17th century English transitional period. The tomb is sacred for the Betawi people, where the wayang kulit of Betawi is performed during maulid.
