= Setu Babakan Betawi Cultural Village =

Cultural park in Jakarta, Indonesia

Setu Babakan Betawi Cultural Village Setu Babakan
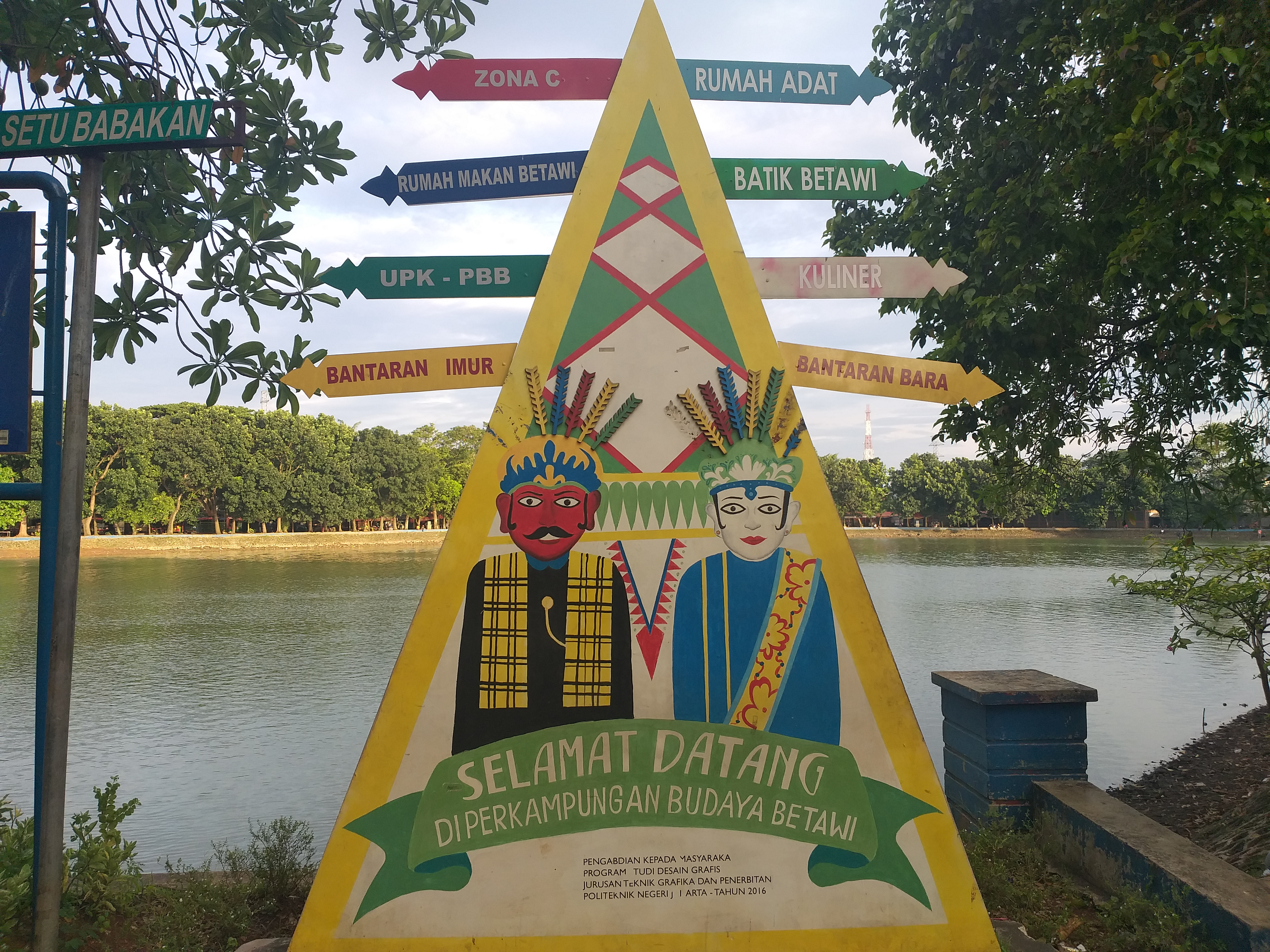
- Welcome sign to Setu Babakan

- Location within Jakarta Location within Indonesia
- Type: Urban park
- Location: Jagakarsa, Jakarta
- Coordinates: 6.341667°S 106.823889°E
- Area: 117 hectares (290 acres)
- Owner: Pemprov DKI Jakarta
- Operator: Department of Parks and Cemetery, Jakarta
- Status: Open all year

Setu Babakan Betawi Cultural Village or Setu Babakan is a cultural park of Betawi people, which is located at Srengseng Sawah, Jagakarsa, Jakarta in Indonesia. The village is about 5 kilometers southeast of Ragunan Zoo at the center of the Betawi Cultural Village, a site considered as part of the cultural heritage of Jakarta, which is devoted to the preservation of the indigenous Betawi culture. The location of the Betawi Cultural Village is replacement of the previous Condet (Betawi) Cultural Village which is eroded by the time.

== Attractions ==
Betawi Cultural Village has an area of about 289 hectares, and divided into five zones. The first one, Zone A, consists of a three-story Betawi Museum, amphitheater, traditional houses, workshop areas and other public facilities. Variety of Betawi cultural arts performance such as Cokek dance, Topeng dance, Marawis, Gambus art, Lenong, Tanjidor, Gambang Kromong and Ondel-ondel is often performed on an outdoor stage every weekdays. Every year in the month of July a special Betawi Cultural Festival is held here that include wedding, circumcision ceremonies, seven-months’ pregnancy rites, and more.

At Zone E of the village souvenirs, food, snack and beverage vendors can be found. There are numerous food stalls serving Betawi cuisines such include Kerak Telor (thin omelet mixed with glutinous rice), Toge Goreng (fried beansprouts), Arum Manis (candy floss), Soto Betawi, Bir Pletok, Nasi Uduk, and many more.

The village has two natural lakes namely, Setu Babakan and Setu Mangga Bolong. Setu Babakan/Babakan lake (Setu or Situ means Small Lake) has an area of 32 hectares (79 ac) in which the water flows in from the Ciliwung River and currently is used for fish farming by the Betawi people who live in the vicinity of the lake. There are more than 100 floating net cages placed in the lake to breed different kinds of fish, including carp, tilapia, and several species of ornamental fish. The lake is a place for aquatic recreational activities, such as rafting, and fishing. The garden surrounding the lake is cultivated with fruit and other plants, such as banana, coconut, and guava.

== See also ==
- List of drainage basins of Indonesia
