= Beji =

Beji Kecamatan Beji
- Town and District
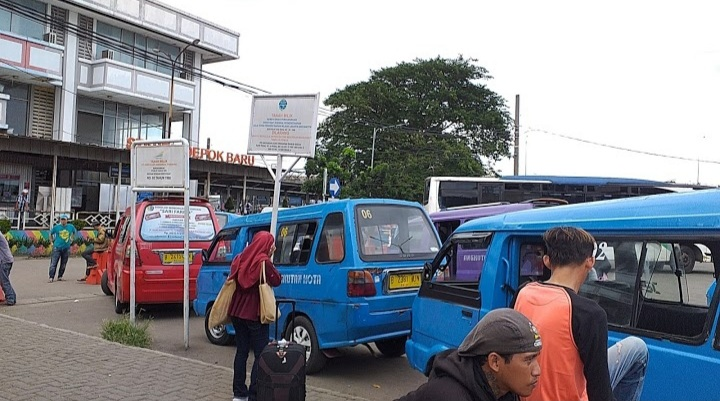
- Metropolitan area

- Location in the city of Depok, Java and Indonesia Beji (Java) Beji (Indonesia)
- Coordinates: 6.370410°S 106.817558°E
- Country: Indonesia
- Province: West Java
- City: Depok

Area
  - Total: 14.56 km^{2} (5.62 sq mi)

Population (mid 2023 estimate)
  - Total: 171,660
- Time zone: UTC+7 (IWST)
- Area code: (+62) 21
- Villages: 6
- Website: beji.depok.go.id

Beji is a town and an administrative district (kecamatan) within the city of Depok, in the province of West Java, Indonesia, within the Jakarta metropolitan area. It covers an area of 14.56 km^{2} and had a population of 165,903 at the 2010 Census and 171,700 at the 2020 Census; the official estimate as at mid 2023 is 171,660. The University of Indonesia, Gunadarma University, Bina Sarana Informatika and Jakarta State Polytechnic are located in this area.

== Communities ==
Beji District is sub-divided into six urban communities (kelurahan) listed below with their areas and their officially-estimated populations as at mid 2022, together with their postcodes.

Regional Code	Name of kelurahan	Area in km^{2}	Population mid 2022 estimate	Post code
32.76.06.1001	Beji (town)	1.94	47,744	16421
32.76.06.1002	Kukusan	3.47	18,307	16425
32.76.06.1003	Tanah Baru	3.47	34,397	16426
32.76.06.1004	Kemirimuka	2.27	32,074	16423
32.76.06.1005	Pondok Cina	2.78	12,239	16424
32.76.06.1006	Beji Timur	0.71	11,099	16422
32.76.06	Totals	14.53	155,860 ^{(a)}	

Notes: (a) comprising 78,042 males and 77,818 females.

== Facilities and infrastructure ==
There are many educational institutions located in this area including the University of Indonesia, Gunadarma University and Bina Sarana Informatika. The area has several hospitals, and many places of worship such as mosques and churches. At Tanah Baru Village, there are housing areas such as Arroyyan Tanah Baru, Beji Permai, Depok Mulya III, and Griya Sakinah.

In Tanah Baru, there are Integrated Islamic Primary Schools such as SDIT Taman Ilmu. Sweet Bee Playground and Arroyyan Kindergarten are located in the Arroyyan Tanah Baru Housing.

Margo City and Depok Town Square shopping malls are located in this area, and are very popular spots for general recreation.

== Transportation ==
Pondok Cina and UI station of Jakarta Metro-rail is located in this area. Beji is connected by Cinere–Jagorawi Toll Road.
