= Lenteng Agung railway station =

Railway station in Indonesia

B16 Lenteng Agung Station Stasiun Lenteng Agung
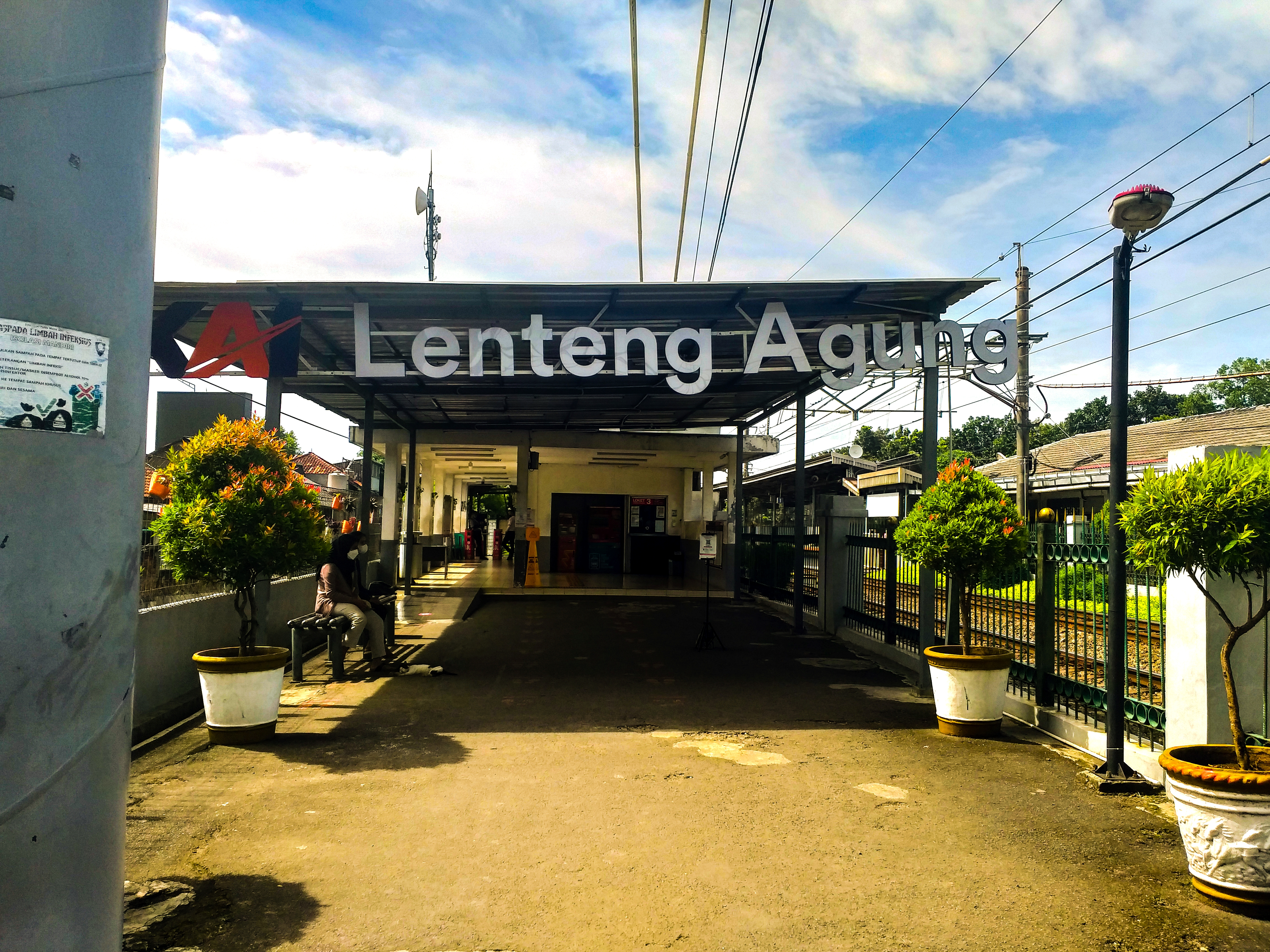
- Lenteng Agung station west entrance, 2022

General information
- Location: Jl. Raya Lenteng Agung Timur, Lenteng Agung, Jagakarsa, South Jakarta; Jakarta; Indonesia
- Coordinates: 6.3304°S 106.8345°E
- Elevation: +57 m (187 ft)
- Owner: Kereta Api Indonesia
- Operator: KAI Commuter
- Lines: Manggarai–Padalarang railway; Bogor Line
- Platforms: 2 side platforms
- Tracks: 2

Construction
- Structure type: Ground
- Parking: Available
- Accessible: Available

Other information
- Station code: LNA • 0704
- Classification: Class II

History
- Opened: 31 January 1873; 153 years ago
- Electrified: 1 May 1930
- Former names: Lenteng Agong Station

Services
Preceding station		Following station
Tanjung Barat towards Jakarta Kota	Commuter Line Bogor	Universitas Pancasila towards Bogor or Nambo
Location
- Location within Jakarta

Lenteng Agung Station (LNA), is a railway station located on Jl. Lenteng Agung Timur, Lenteng Agung, Jagakarsa, South Jakarta. The station, which is located at an altitude of +57 meters, is included in the Jakarta Operational Area I and only serves the KRL Commuterline route. Similar to Lebakjero Station in West Java, the tracks at this station is curved, forming an S curve.

== Building and layout ==
Lenteng Agung Station has two railway lines. Line 1 is a straight line towards Manggarai, while line 2 is a straight line towards Citayam. This station has two side platforms.

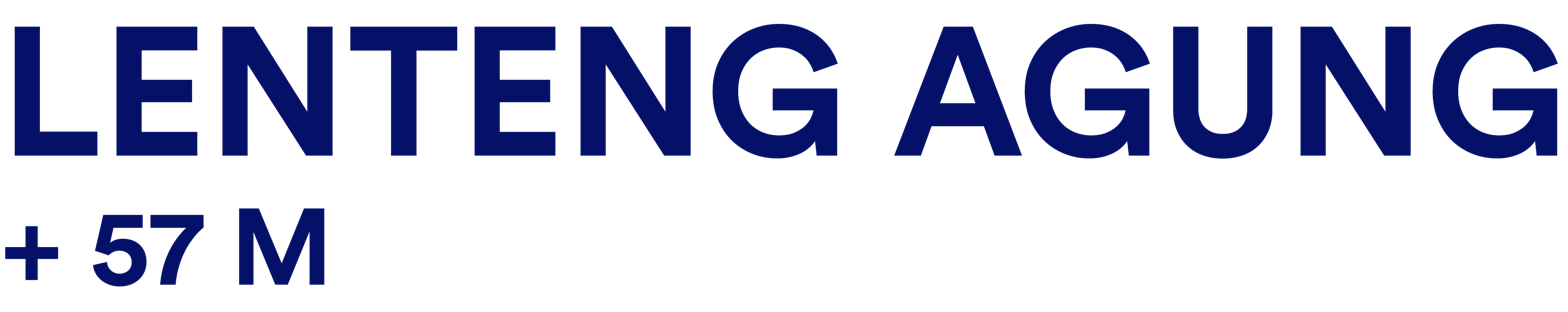
B16
G	Main building	
Platform floor	Side platform, the doors are opened on the right side	
Platform floor	Line 1	← (Tanjung Barat) Bogor Line to Jakarta Kota
Platform floor	Line 2	Bogor Line to Bogor or Nambo (Universitas Pancasila) →
Platform floor	Side platform, the doors are opened on the right side	

== Services ==
The following is a list of train services at the Lenteng Agung Station

=== Passenger services ===
- KAI Commuter
  - Bogor Line, to Jakarta Kota and Bogor
  - Bogor Line (Nambo branch), to Jakarta Kota and Nambo

== Supporting transportation ==
Public transport type	Line	Destination
Transjakarta		Manggarai Station-University of Indonesia (integrated with corridors)
Transjakarta		Lebak Bulus–University of Indonesia (integrated with corridors)
Transjakarta	JAK-44 (Mikrotrans Jak Lingko)	Universitas Pancasila Station-Pondok Labu
Transjakarta	JAK-64 (Mikrotrans Jak Lingko)	Universitas Pancasila Station-Cipedak
Regular Transjabodetabek	DJ1	Depok Terminal–Lebak Bulus Termilan (via Margonda-Lenteng Agung Raya-T.B. Simatupang)
Regular Transjabodetabek	DJ2	Depok Terminal-Kalideres Terminal (via T.B. Simatupang-Metro Pondok Indah-Sultan Iskandar Muda-Daan Mogot)
Angkot	D83	Cipedak-Lenteng Agung Market
Angkot	D129	Tugu-Pasar Minggu Terminal
Koperasi Wahana Kalpika (KWK)	S02	Lenteng Agung Market-Pondok Labu
Koperasi Wahana Kalpika (KWK)	T19	Kampung Rambutan Terminal-Depok Terminal
Mikrolet	M17	Pasar Minggu Terminal-Lenteng Agung Market
Miniarta	M03	Depok Terminal–Pasar Minggu Terminal
Miniarta	M04	Abadijaya–Pasar Minggu Terminal

== Incidents ==
- On 27 February 2007 at 07:10, 516 EMU breaks down at Lenteng Agung Station. As a result of this incident, the level crossing near the IISIP Jakarta campus (now the level crossing has been replaced by an overpass) was closed longer, causing long traffic jams.

== Gallery ==
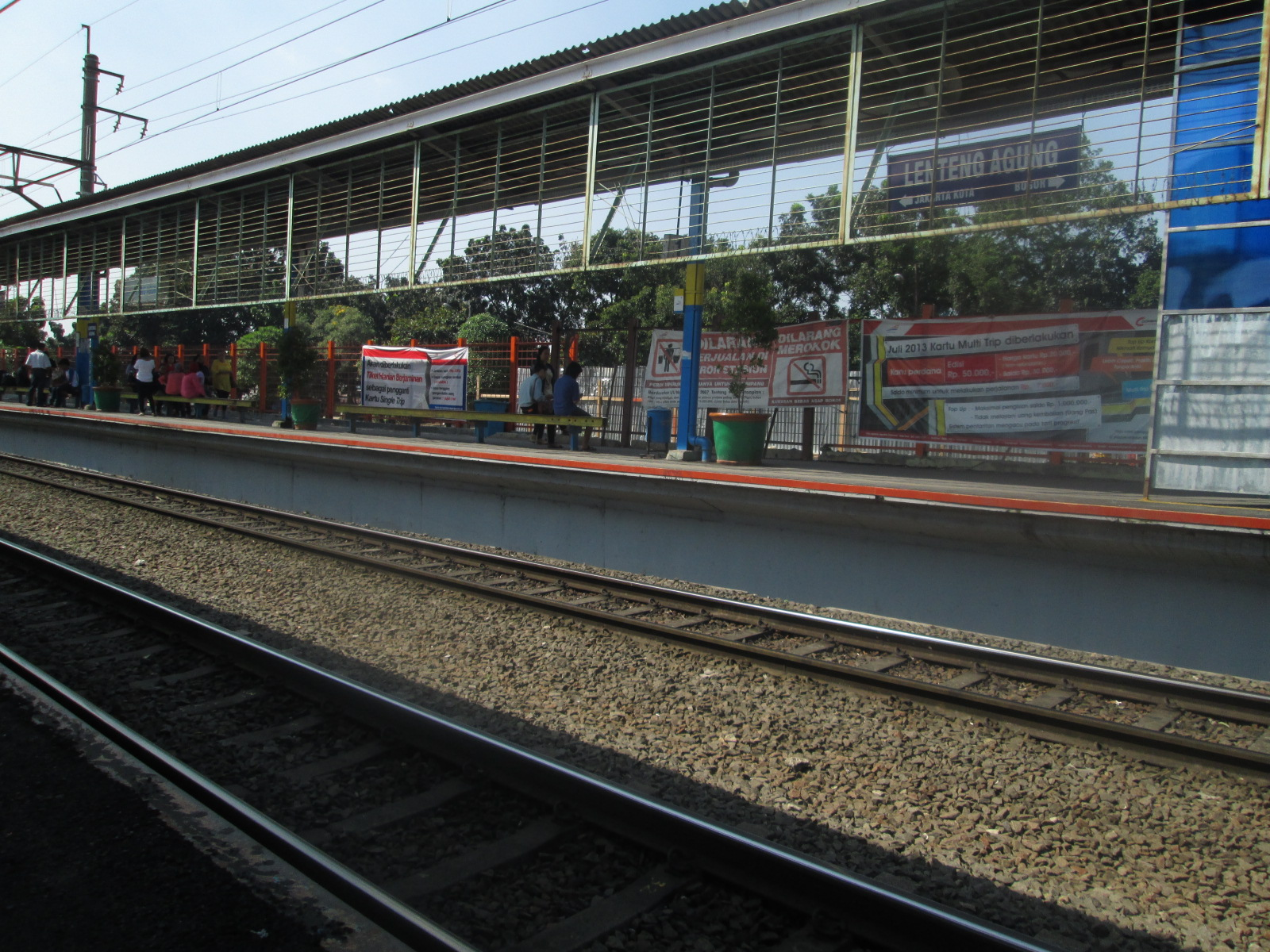
The platform of the station after the demolition of buildings surrounding the station, 2013

Preceding station	Kereta Api Indonesia	Following station
Tanjung Barat towards Manggarai	Manggarai–Padalarang	Universitas Pancasila towards Padalarang
