= Gunadarma University =

University in Depok, Indonesia

- Universitas Gunadarma
- Motto: Masa Depan Diraih Saat Ini (The Future is Seized Now)
- Type: Private
- Established: 7 August 1981
- Rector: Prof. Dr. E.S. Margianti, SE, MM.
- Location: Depok, West Java, Indonesia
- Campus: Depok, Central Jakarta, Tangerang, Bekasi
- Colours: Purple
- Nickname: Gundar, UG
- Website: gunadarma.ac.id

Gunadarma University, or commonly called (UG, Gundar), is one of the private university in Indonesia. The main campus is in Depok City, West Java. It is also the first university to have a campus at new capital Nusantara.

== History ==
On August 7, 1981, the Computer Science Education Program (PPIK) was established in Jakarta which three years later changed to the Gunadarma School of Informatics and Computer Management (STMIK). Six years later, on January 13, 1990, to be precise, the Gunadarma College of Economics (STIE Gunadarma) was founded.

In 1993, STMIK and STIE opened a master's program with a concentration in information systems management for STMIK and a master's in management for STIE. Furthermore, through S.K. Director General of Higher Education No.92/Kep/Dikti/1996 dated 3 April 1996, STMIK and STIE Gunadarma merged to become Gunadarma University together with four new faculties, namely the faculty of industrial technology, faculty of civil engineering and planning, faculty of psychology, and faculty of letters. Opening the new millennium, Gunadarma University opened a doctoral program in economics based on the permission of the director general of the Higher Education Ministry of Education of the Republic of Indonesia No. 55/DIKTI/2000 which was followed by the opening of the information technology doctoral program based on the permission of the director general of Higher Education Ministry of Education of the Republic of Indonesia No. 3716/P/T/2002. Gunarma University has been accredited A and is ranked number 17 in Indonesia's Webometrics version in 2022.

== Faculties and study programs ==
The faculties and study programs at Gunadarma University are as follows;

Level	Faculty	Study Program
Diploma/Vocational	Accounting	D3 Accounting
Diploma/Vocational	Midwifery	D3 Midwifery
Diploma/Vocational	Information Technology Diploma Program	D3 Informatics Management
Diploma/Vocational	Entrepreneurship Business Diploma Program	D3 Financial Management
Diploma/Vocational	Entrepreneurship Business Diploma Program	D3 Marketing Management
Diploma/Vocational	Information Technology Diploma Program	D3 Computer Engineering
Undergraduate	Literature	English Literature
Undergraduate	Literature	Chinese Literature
Undergraduate	Literature	Tourism
Undergraduate	Medicine	Medicine
Undergraduate	Pharmacy	Pharmacy
Undergraduate	Psychology	Psychology
Undergraduate	Communication Studies	Communication Studies
Undergraduate	Computer Science and Information Technology	Information Systems
Undergraduate	Computer Science and Information Technology	Computer System
Undergraduate	Economy	Management
Undergraduate	Economy	Accounting
Undergraduate	Economy	Sharia Economics
Undergraduate	Civil Engineering and Planning	Civil Engineering
Undergraduate	Civil Engineering and Planning	Architecture
Undergraduate	Civil Engineering and Planning	Interior Design
Undergraduate	Industrial Technology	Informatics
Undergraduate	Industrial Technology	Electrical Engineering
Undergraduate	Industrial Technology	Mechanical Engineering
Undergraduate	Industrial Technology	Industrial Engineering
Undergraduate	Industrial Technology	Agrotechnology
Postgraduate	Economics	Doctor of Economics
Postgraduate	Psychology	Doctor of Psychological Sciences
Postgraduate	Computer Science and Information Technology	Doctor of Information Technology
Postgraduate	Communication Studies	Master of Communication Studies
Postgraduate	Economy	Master of Management
Postgraduate	Psychology	Master of Psychology
Postgraduate	Psychology	Master of Professional Psychology
Postgraduate	Literature	Master of English Literature
Postgraduate	Computer Science and Information Technology	Master of Information Systems Management
Postgraduate	Industrial Technology	Master of Electrical Engineering
Postgraduate	Civil Engineering and Planning	Master of Civil Engineering

== Campus ==
Gunadarma University, has campuses spread across various regions:

- Campus A (Kenari Campus) is on Jl. Kenari 1, Central Jakarta.
- Campus B (Salemba Bluntas Campus) is on Jl. Murtado 3, Paseban, Central Jakarta
- Campus C (Salemba Campus) is on Jl. Salemba Raya No. 53, Central Jakarta
- Campus D (Depok Campus/Main Campus) is on Jl. Margonda Raya Pondok Cina, Depok
- Campus E (Campus Dua) is located on Jl. Akses Kelapa Dua Kelapa Dua, Cimanggis
- Campus G (Laboratory Campus Kelapa Dua) is on Jl. Akses Kelapa Dua Kelapa Dua, Cimanggis
- Campus H (Laboratory Campus Kelapa Dua) is on Jl. Akses Kelapa Dua Kelapa Dua, Cimanggis
- Campus H2 (Simatupang Campus) is on Jl. Tahi Bonar Simatupang Plot. 38, South Jakarta
- Campus J1 (Kalimalang) Jl. KH. Noer Ali, Kalimalang, Jakasampurna, West Bekasi
- Campus J3 (Kalimas Campus) is on Jl. Raya Kalimalang, Bekasi
- Campus J4 (Kemang Pratama Campus) is on Jl. Kemang Pratama Raya No. 13, East Jakarta
- Campus J5 (Cakung Campus) is located on Jl. Sentra Primer Baru Timur, East Jakarta
- Campus L (Cengkareng Campus) is on Jl. Raya Kamal Outring Number. 75, West Jakarta
- Campus K (Kampus Karawaci) is on Jl. Kelapa Dua Raya No. 93, Tangerang
- Nusantara Campus: It became the first university to start a campus in the new Indonesian capital.

== Notable alumni ==
- Ayu Ting Ting
