= Universitas Pancasila railway station =

Railway station in South Jakarta, Indonesia

B17 Universitas Pancasila Station Stasiun Universitas Pancasila
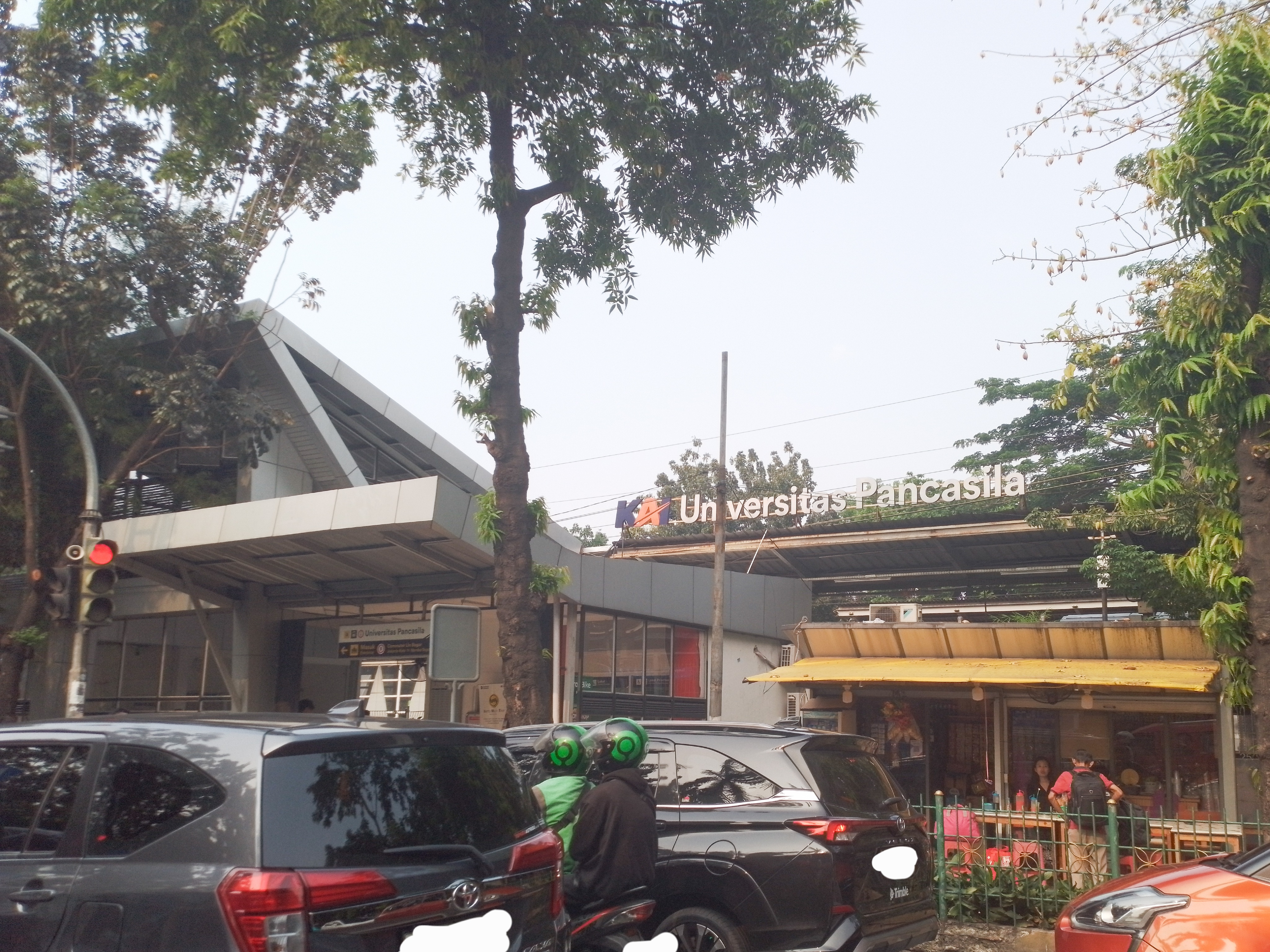
- Entrance gate, 2026

General information
- Location: Lenteng Agung Street, Srengseng Sawah, Jagakarsa, South Jakarta 12630; Jakarta; Indonesia
- Coordinates: 6.33583°S 106.834167°E
- Elevation: +57 m (187 ft)
- Owner: Kereta Api Indonesia
- Operator: KAI Commuter
- Line: Bogor Line
- Platforms: 2 side platforms
- Tracks: 2

Construction
- Structure type: At-grade
- Accessible: Available

Other information
- Station code: UP
- Classification: II

History
- Opened: 1987

Services
Preceding station		Following station
Lenteng Agung towards Jakarta Kota	Commuter Line Bogor	Universitas Indonesia towards Bogor or Nambo
Location
- Location within Jakarta

Universitas Pancasila Station (Indonesian: Stasiun Universitas Pancasila, station code: UP) is a railway station located in Srengseng Sawah, Jagakarsa, South Jakarta, Indonesia. The station serves the Bogor Line of the Commuterline. It is located opposite the namesake Pancasila University and is the southernmost railway station in Jakarta.

The station primarily serves college students of the namesake university, as well as residents living in the area. As with the adjacent Universitas Indonesia station, this station is often referred to with its abbreviation UP, instead of its full name.

== History ==
The station opened in 1987 as one of the newest additions to the Jakarta–Bogor railway. The station opened to serve the university that had opened in the area in 1966.

From 1987 to 2013, the station and many other stations in Greater Jakarta suffered from a lack of enforcement of laws, with passengers smoking and hawkers selling their products inside the station. In 2013, the station, alongside many others in Greater Jakarta, was fully sterilised of hawkers and e-ticketing was implemented throughout.

On 8 September 2021, a new underpass opened to facilitate passengers crossing between the two platforms. A lift is also provided on both sides of each platform. As a result, passengers are no longer allowed to cross the railway tracks using the old level crossing.

== Layout ==
The station has two railway tracks.

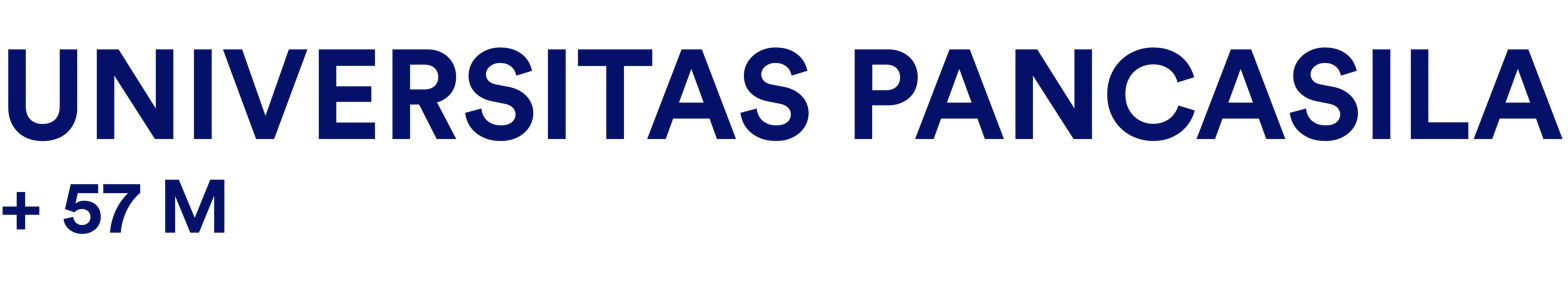
B17
Platform floor	Side platform, the doors are opened on the right side	
Platform floor	Line 1	← (Lenteng Agung) Bogor Line to Jakarta Kota
Platform floor	Line 2	Bogor Line to Bogor or Nambo (Universitas Indonesia) →
Platform floor	Side platform, the doors are opened on the right side	
Ground floor	Main station building	

== Services ==
The following is a list of train services at the Universitas Pancasila Station.

Passenger services

- KAI Commuter
  - Bogor Line, to Jakarta Kota and Bogor
  - Bogor Line (Nambo branch), to Jakarta Kota and Nambo

== Connecting services ==
Type	Route	Destination
Transjakarta Non-BRT	4B	University of Indonesia—Manggarai Station
Transjakarta Non-BRT	9H	Srengseng Sawah—Pasar Minggu Bus Terminal
Transjakarta Non-BRT	D21	University of Indonesia—Lebak Bulus
Mikrotrans by Transjakarta	JAK-44	Universitas Pancasila Station—Cinere
Mikrotrans by Transjakarta	JAK-64	Universitas Pancasila Station—Cipedak
