= Tanjung Barat railway station =

Railway station in Indonesia

B15 Tanjung Barat Station Stasiun Tanjung Barat
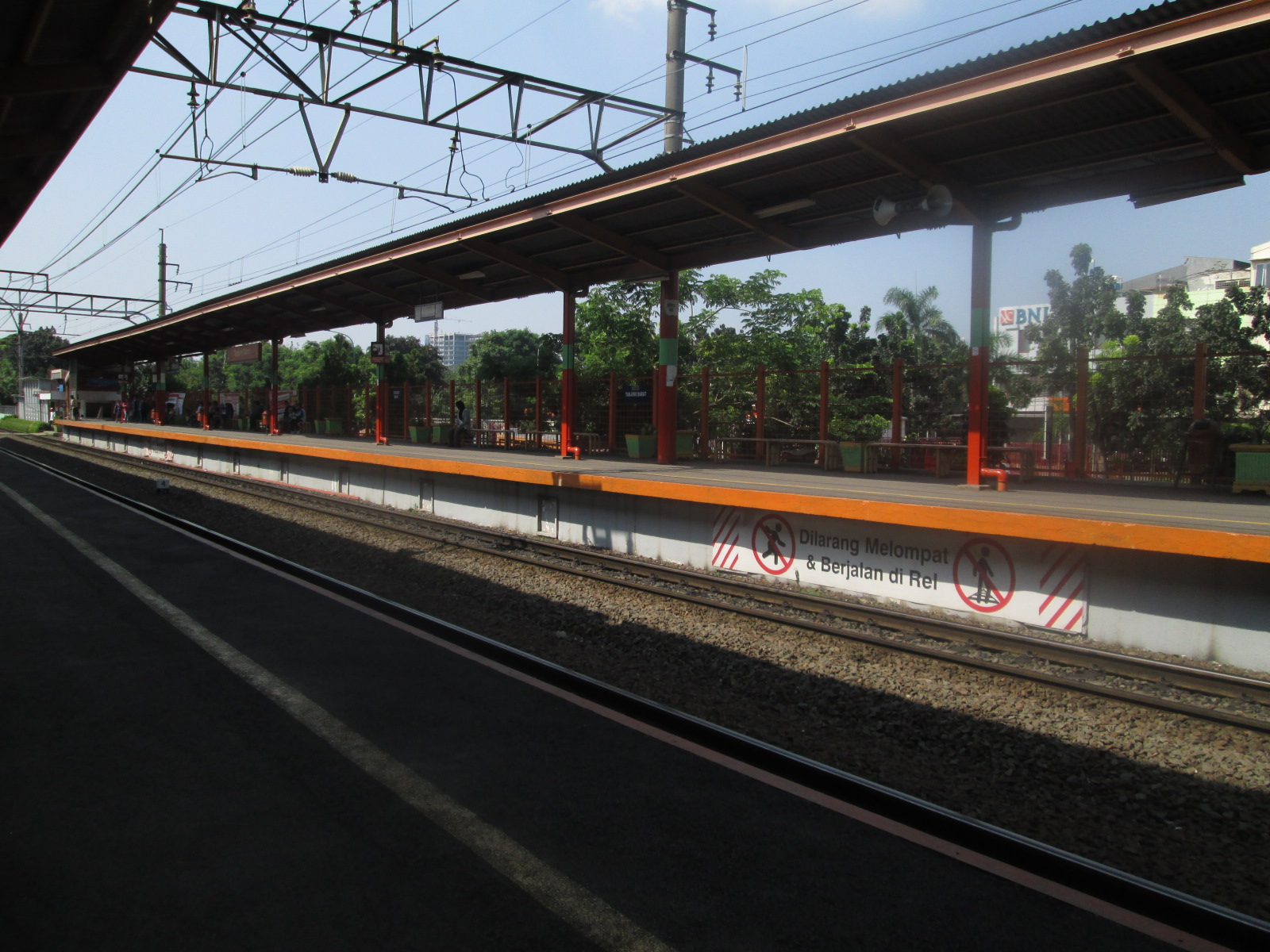
- Tanjung Barat Station

General information
- Location: Tanjung Barat, Jagakarsa, South Jakarta; Jakarta; Indonesia
- Coordinates: 6.3083°S 106.8389°E
- Elevation: +44 m (144 ft)
- Owner: Kereta Api Indonesia
- Operator: KAI Commuter
- Lines: Manggarai–Padalarang railway; Bogor Line
- Platforms: 2 side platforms
- Tracks: 2

Construction
- Structure type: Ground
- Parking: Available
- Accessible: Available

Other information
- Station code: TNT
- Classification: Class II

Services
Preceding station		Following station
Pasar Minggu towards Jakarta Kota	Commuter Line Bogor	Lenteng Agung towards Bogor or Nambo
Location
- Location within Jakarta

Tanjung Barat Station (TNT) is a class II railway station located in Tanjung Barat, Jagakarsa, South Jakarta. The station, which is located at an altitude of +44 m, is included in the Jakarta Operational Area I and only serves the KRL Commuterline route.

After being renovated in 2009, this station has different facilities and atmosphere compared to other stations. Bright orange and red colors dominate every corner of the room at this station, and there is also a signboard that guides prospective passengers to step. Coupled with 4 flat-screen televisions as a means of indicating the arrival of trains, it's not surprising that Tanjung Barat Station was used as a pilot station for all stations in Jabodetabek.

== Building and layout ==
This station has two railway tracks.

B15 Tanjung Barat
G	Main building	
Platform floor	Side platform, the doors are opened on the right side	
Platform floor	Line 2	← (Pasar Minggu) Bogor Line to Jakarta Kota
Platform floor	Line 1	Bogor Line to Bogor or Nambo (Lenteng Agung) →
Platform floor	Side platform, the doors are opened on the right side	
G	Main building	

== Services ==
The following is a list of train services at the Tanjung Barat Station

=== Passenger services ===
- KAI Commuter
  - Bogor Line, to Jakarta Kota and Bogor
  - Bogor Line (Nambo branch), to Jakarta Kota and Nambo

== Supporting transportation ==
Public transport type	Line	Destination
Transjakarta		Manggarai–University of Indonesia
Transjakarta		Blok M–Cipedak
Transjakarta		Lebak Bulus–University of Indonesia
Regular Transjabodetabek	DJ1	Depok Terminal–Lebak Bulus Terminal (via Margonda-Lenteng Agung Raya-T.B. Simatupang)
Regular Transjabodetabek	DJ2	Depok Terminal-Kalideres Terminal (via T.B. Simatupang-Metro Pondok Indah-Sultan Iskandar Muda-Daan Mogot)
Angkot	129	Tugu–Pasar Minggu Terminal
Koperasi Wahana Kalpika (KWK)	T19	Depok Terminal–Kampung Rambutan Terminal
Miniarta	M03	Depok Terminal–Pasar Minggu Terminal
Miniarta	M04	Abadijaya-Pasar Minggu Terminal
Kopaja	616	Blok M Terminal-Cipedak

Preceding station	Kereta Api Indonesia	Following station
Pasar Minggu towards Manggarai	Manggarai–Padalarang	Lenteng Agung towards Padalarang
