= Depok railway station =

Railway station in Indonesia

B21 Depok Station Stasiun Depok
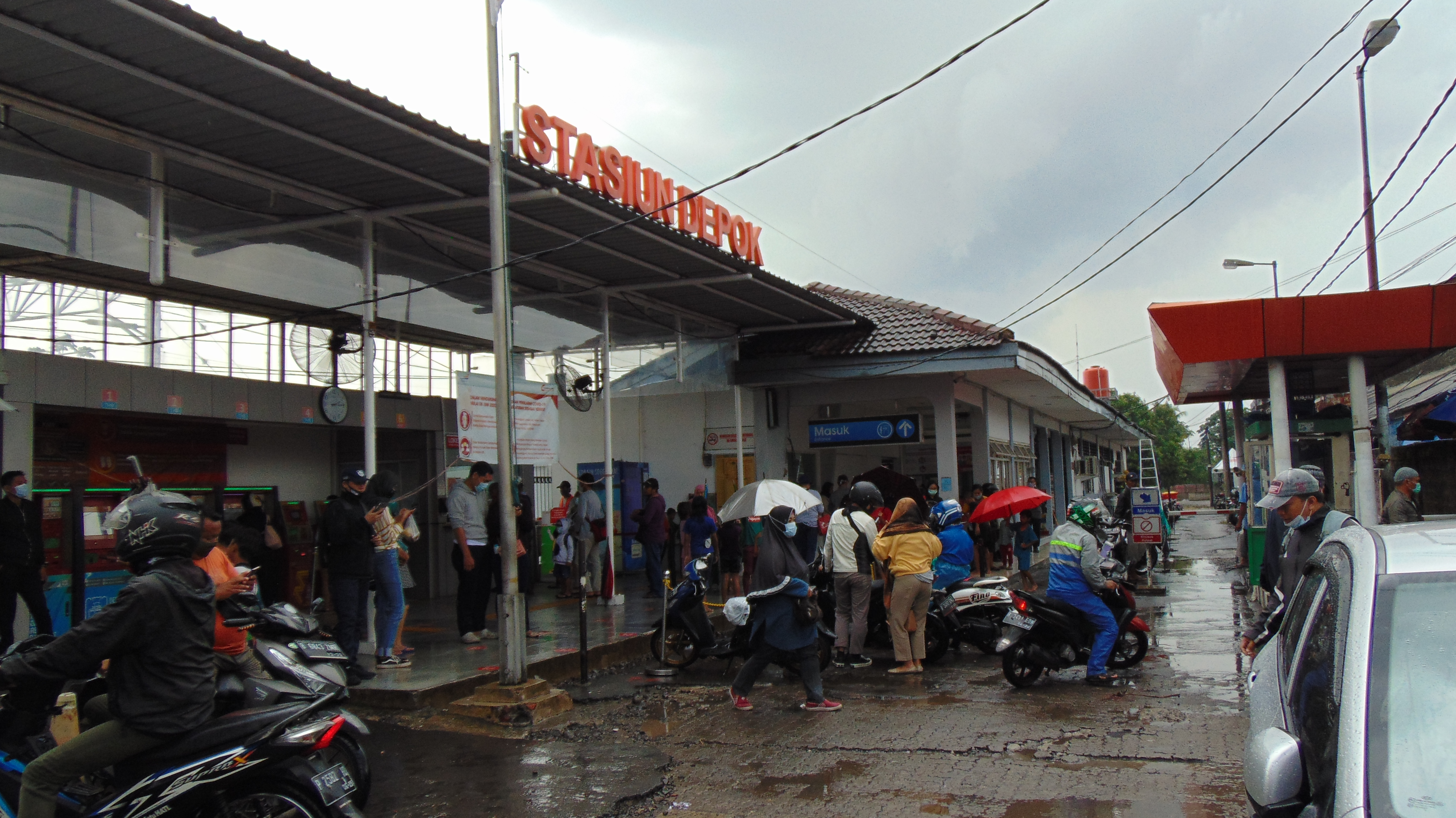
- Front view of Depok station, 2020.

General information
- Location: Jl. Stasiun Depok, Depok, Pancoran Mas, Depok; West Java; Indonesia
- Coordinates: 6°24′16″S 106°49′02″E
- Elevation: +93 m (305 ft)
- System: Commuter line station
- Owner: Kereta Api Indonesia
- Operator: KAI Commuter
- Lines: Manggarai–Padalarang railway; Bogor Line
- Platforms: 2 island platforms
- Tracks: 4

Construction
- Structure type: Ground
- Parking: Available
- Cycle facilities: Available
- Accessible: Available

Other information
- Station code: DP • 0706
- Classification: Large class type C

History
- Opened: 31 January 1873 (as Depok NIS station), 1920~ (Taken-over by SS) 1939 (Cooperated and Integrated with TTSM)
- Rebuilt: 1988
- Electrified: 6 April 1925
- Original company: Nederlandsch-Indische Spoorweg Maatschappij

Passengers
- 2018: 9.1 million

Services
Preceding station		Following station
Depok Baru towards Jakarta Kota	Commuter Line Bogor	Citayam towards Bogor or Nambo
Location
- Location within Depok

Depok Station (DP) is a railway station located in Depok, Pancoran Mas, Depok, West Java. This station is commonly known as Depok Lama (Old Depok), to distinguish with Depok Baru (lit. 'New Depok') Station. The station is one of the oldest station in Jakarta metropolitan area. At present it serves as a station of Jakarta Commuter Rail. Depok EMU depot is located to the southwest of the station.

Since 25 March 2021, this station along with Bekasi, Tanah Abang, Kranji, Jakarta Kota, Depok Baru, Bojonggede, Citayam, Parungpanjang and Angke stations officially ceased the sale of Guaranteed Daily Tickets (Indonesian: Tiket Harian Berjaminan or THB) for KRL Commuterline services.

== History ==
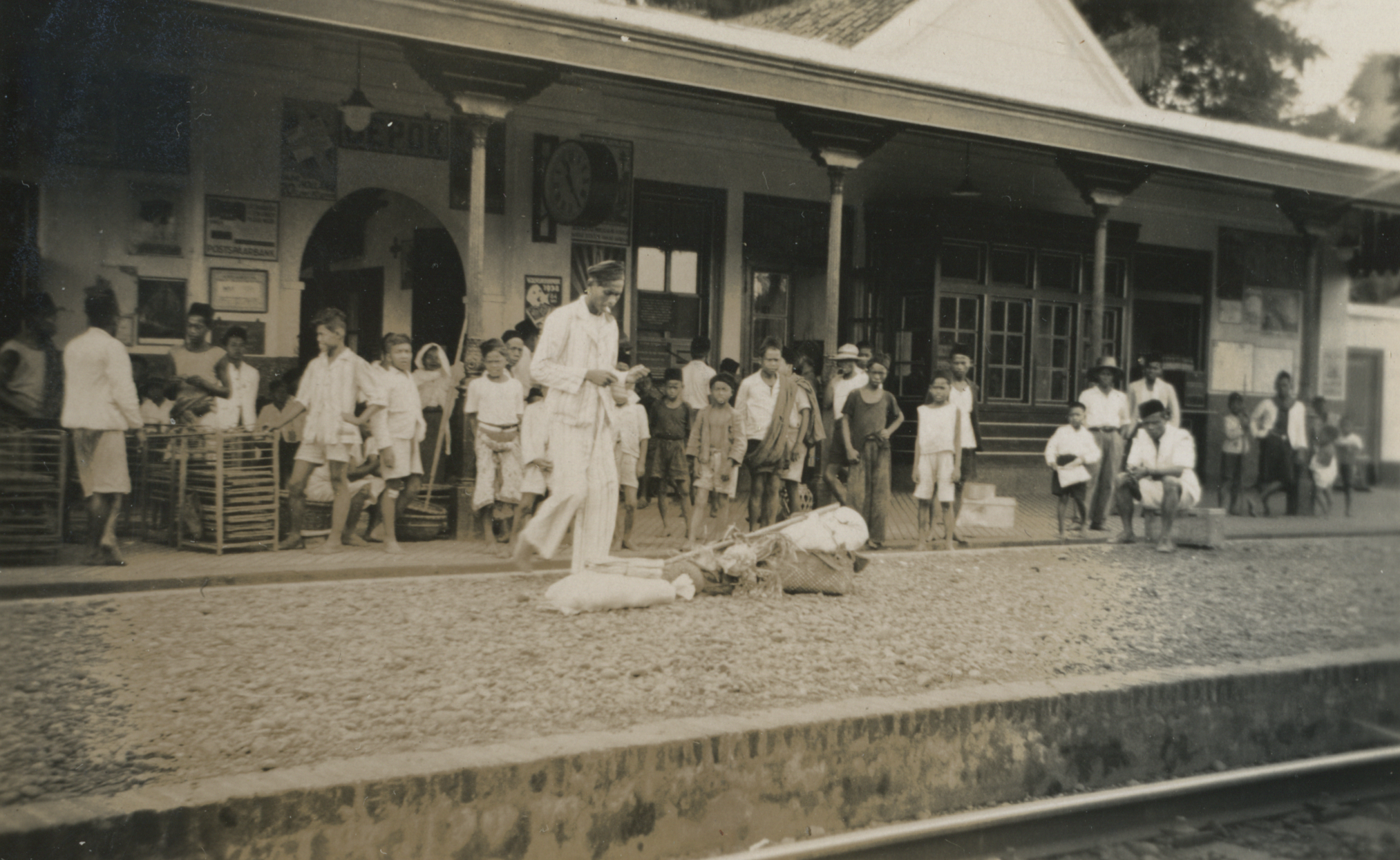
The ex-NIS emplacement of the Depok station. It was still displaying arc-shaped doors which is similar to same one at the Salem railway station in Sragen, Central Java

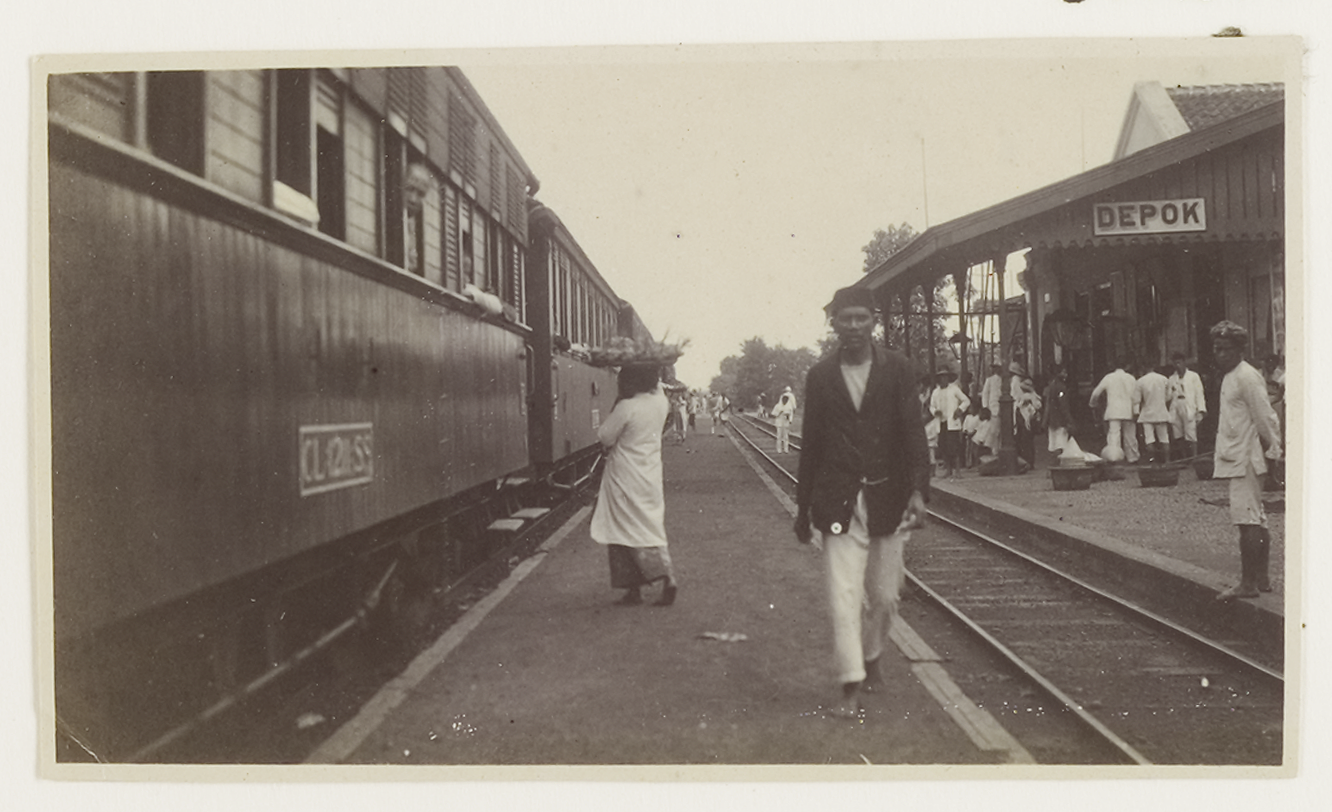
The platform of the station, c. 1925.

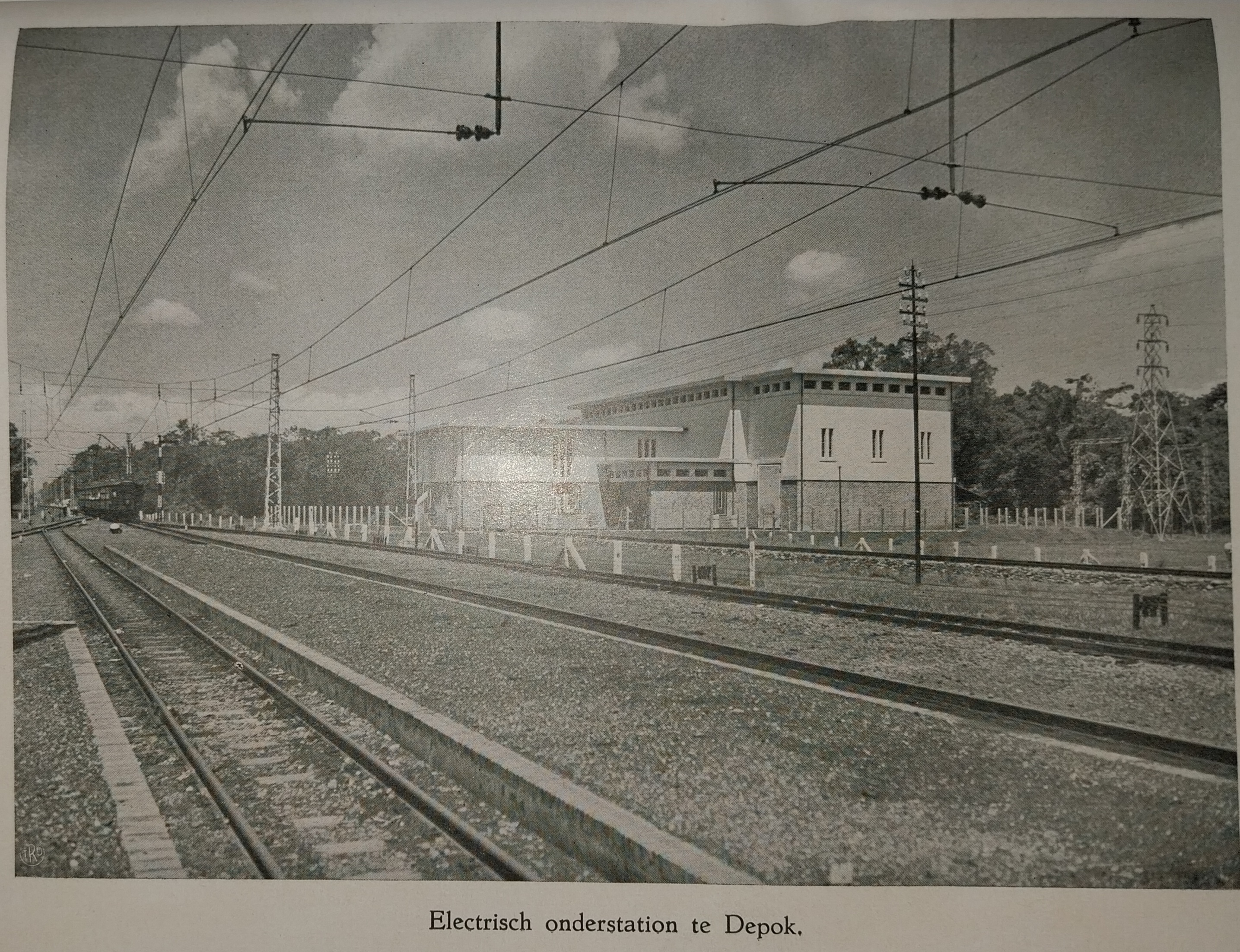
The EMU depart from Depok Station, c. 1930.

In the 17th to 18th centuries, Depok was a kawedanan area as well as a plantation founded by the landlord Cornelis Chastelein. Until the 19th century the city that Chastelein built continued to grow. Given the increasing need for transporting plantations and passengers, in the late 1860s the Batavia–Buitenzorg railway line was built by the Nederlandsch-Indische Spoorweg Maatschappij, the first heavy rail company in the Dutch East Indies.

The station was opened by the NIS at the same time as the opening of the last segment, Meester Cornelis N.I.S.–Buitenzorg on 31 January 1873. Unlike the Samarang–Vorstenlanden railway, which uses a gauge width of 1,435 mm, the NIS uses a 1,067 mm gauge for this route. On 1 November 1913, the Staatsspoorwegen officially purchased the NIS assets on the line and eventually developed this station.

In connection with the development of SS services, electric trains and electric locomotives have started running on the Tandjongpriok (Tanjung Priuk)–Batavia–Buitenzorg and Tandjongpriok–Meester Cornelis (Jatinegara) lines. To realize this, the SS built overhead line poles along these lines, and on 6 April 1925, the electric multiple unit started operating in conjunction with the 50th anniversary of Staatsspoorwegen's contributions in Java.

At the end of the '80s, the Depok Station was rebuilt, all the old lines, the old catenary pole, demolished because the line from Manggarai–Depok was built double tracks. Since then, the old building has ceased to exist. While the double tracks from Depok Station to Bogor was only completed in the late '90s, after the 1993 Ratu Jaya train accident between Depok Station with Citayam Station made the existence of a double track important.

== Building and layout ==
To the south from Depok Station, there is a KRL depot, which is the largest in Southeast Asia. Now this station has four lines to speed up KRL Commuterline trips from Bogor and for the final stop for trains bound for Depok Station. Depok Station has its own uniqueness. If in general stations that have 4 lines, such as Gambir, upper Manggarai, Tambun, Pasar Minggu, and Cakung Stations, lines 2 and 3 are straight tracks, then Depok Station lines 1 and 4 are straight tracks.

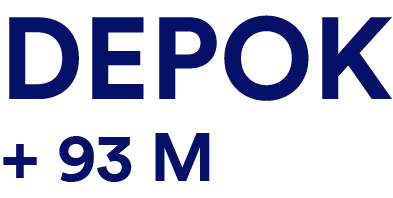
B21
G
Main building
P

Platform floor

Line 1
← (Depok Baru)
Bogor Line to Jakarta Kota

Island platform, the doors are opened on the left side of the train arrival on line 1, or on the right side of the train arrival on line 2
Line 2
← (Depok Baru)
Bogor Line from and towards Jakarta Kota and to Bogor or Nambo
(Citayam) →
Line 3
← (Depok Baru)
Bogor Line from and towards Jakarta Kota and to Bogor or Nambo
(Citayam) →
Island platform, the doors are opened on the right side of the train arrival on line 3, or on the left side of the train arrival on line 4
Line 4

Bogor Line to Bogor or Nambo
(Citayam) →
G
West gate and ticket lockets

== Services ==
The following is a list of train services at the Depok Station.

=== Passenger services ===
- KAI Commuter
  - Bogor Line, to Jakarta Kota and Bogor
  - Bogor Line (Nambo branch), to Jakarta Kota and Nambo

== Supporting transportation ==
Public transport type	Line	Destination
Angkot	D05	Depok Bus Terminal–Bojong Gede Bus Terminal
Angkot	D05A	Citayam Bus Terminal–Grand Depok City Boulevard–Jatijajar
Angkot	D10A	Depok Bus Terminal–Grand Depok City Boulevard–Jatijajar

== Incidents ==
- On 25 July 2013, a KRL Commuterline train was on fire on 09:14 WIB. It was suspected that the fire was caused by AC compressor malfunction.
- On 5 December 2018, a KRL Commuterline train emits thick white smoke. There were no casualties, but caused panic among passengers. As a result, the passengers had to be diverted and the fleet immediately brought to the Depok KRL Depot for inspection.

Preceding station	Kereta Api Indonesia	Following station
Depok Baru towards Manggarai	Manggarai–Padalarang	Citayam towards Padalarang
