= Depok Municipality =

Depok Municipality Gemeente Depok (Dutch)
- 1696–1952
- Flag
- Status: Municipality
- Main settlement: Depok Lama
- Ethnic groups: Betawi; Sundanese; Kaum Depok; Chinese; Dutch
- Religion: Islam; Catholicism; Protestantism
- Government: 1696–1714: Private land owned by Cornelis Chastelein within the Dutch East Indies; 1714–1913: Semi-autonomous community owned by descendants of freed slaves within the Dutch East Indies; 1913–1952: Self-governing autonomous community within the Dutch East Indies
- History
  - Established: 1696
  - Proposal for the establishment of Gemeente Depok: 1817
  - Official declaration of self-government: 14 January 1913
  - Japanese occupation of the Dutch East Indies: 1942–1945
  - Gedoran Depok Incident: 11 October 1945
  - Incorporated as part of Indonesia: 4 August 1952
- Currency: Netherlands Indies guilder
Preceded by	Succeeded by
Onderdistrict Parung	Depok District
- Today part of: Depok

De Eerste Protestantse Organisatie van Kristenen (Indonesian: Organisasi Pertama bagi Kristen Protestan, English: First Organization for Protestant Christians) or Depok (Note: Etymologically, the term "Depok" refers to the Sundanese word "Padepokan," which means "resting place." The acronym "Depok" appeared after the arrival of the Dutch in the archipelago.) is an autonomous community that was given the status equivalent to a republic in the Dutch East Indies. The residents living in the Depok area were called "Kaoem Depok" or "Belanda Depok". This idea was initiated by a lawyer from Batavia, R. H. Kleijn in 1871 with the name "Gemeente Depok". This concept was actually implemented on January 14, 1913.

The government formation is managed by the Depok City Council (Dutch: Gemeente Bestuur Depok) whose leader is not called the Mayor, but rather the President. The leadership is carried out internally with the winner of the most votes being chosen by eight commissioner members.

== History ==
In the past, Depok was a private land owned by a Dutch merchant, Cornelis Chastelein on May 18, 1696 with an area of 12.44 km². The land is estimated at 2.4 million rupiah. Although owned by a Dutch landowner, Depok was not controlled or managed by the Dutch East Indies. Chastelein controlled the land of Depok after he resigned from the Dutch East Indies Company. Then, he obtained land rights in Sringsing and Weltevreden. Previously, Depok was owned by Khouw Wie Seng in 1877. Not only Depok, the Khouw family also controlled most of the areas of Cilodong, Bojonggede, and Sawangan. According to the mass media "Het Vaderland", Depok was sold to the Dutch East Indies Government on November 16, 1930 for 600 thousand gulden.

Chastelein took the initiative to make Depok an agricultural area. He brought in around 150 slaves from Bali, Makassar, and Ambon to manage agricultural products, such as coffee, tea, rice, and so on. The slaves were given educational facilities and introduced to the economic system and the teachings of Protestantism. One proof of Chastelein's influence is the construction of the Immanuel Church, which is located next to the Cornelis Chastelein Foundation Building. In addition, he built a city forest located in Pitara which became the forerunner of the main settlement in Geminte Depok as a nature reserve.

Before he died, Chastelein made a will to the slaves under his control to be given freedom. They also inherited land, housing, livestock, and agricultural tools.

== Culture ==
Generally, the residents of Gemeente Depok are Protestant Christians who come from the Netherlands. Depok is also known as a community for church congregations and inhabit this area. However, some of the native residents of Depok embrace Islam and Paganism. The congregation of this church was given surnames, including Jonathans, Laurens, Bacas, Loen, Soedira, Isakh, Samuel, Leander, Joseph, Tholense, Jacob, and Zadokh. When Cornelis Chastelein died, he left a will that his slaves be freed and the term "Kaoem Depok" or "Belanda Depok" emerged.

Depok was originally inhabited by the indigenous Sundanese people who had lived in the Depok area for many years. Following ethnic mixing in Batavia and plans for residential expansion, the Betawi people began to dominate the Depok area.

== Government ==
=== List of heads of state ===
Concerns arose after Jarong van Bali died. Therefore, the freed slaves implemented a democratic system to elect a leader they called the president. At that time, the civil government in Depok was known as Gemeente Bestuur. In Dutch, Depok was called Gemeente Depok. The first acting president, G. Jonathan, began his career as a ticket sales clerk at Depok Station. Due to his diligence, he was appointed as a station administration clerk (stationsklerk). Then he was promoted to Cilebut Station officer. Finally, he served as Head of Depok Station and retired in 1905. The following is a list of Presidents of the Depok Municipality.

1. Gerard Jonathans (1913–1921)
2. Martinus Laurens (1921–1926)
3. Andries Johanes Jonathans (1926–1929)
4. Leonardus Leander (1929–1932)
5. Fredrik Samuel Laurens (1932–1935)
6. G. Loen (1935–1938)
7. Johanes Mathijs Jonathans (1938–1939)
8. Jozef Cornelis Jonathans (1939-1942)
9. Johanes Mathijs Jonathans (1946-1952)

The office of president in this case is not that of head of state, but rather that of head of civil government. The president in question was the founder of Depok Lama, which was the forerunner to the founding of Depok City. During the Japanese occupation, the position of President was vacant. After the Japanese occupation, Johanes Mathijs Jonathans was re-elected as the last president of this municipality. There is no position of vice president, but rather secretary.

The city administration consists of five members: a president, a secretary, a treasurer, and two commissioners. These officers are elected every two or three years by majority vote. Oversight is carried out by eight commissioners, who are similarly elected. A sub-district head is appointed to carry out the duties of maintaining roads, bridges, buildings, and other items.

Johannes Mathijs Jonathans was the last president of the Republic of Depok. On August 4, 1952, the Indonesian government took over all private land in Depok. Except for churches, schools, meeting halls, and cemeteries, all were taken over by the government with compensation of 229,261 rupiah.

== See also ==
- Depok
- Cornelis Chastelein
