= Gunung Putri railway station =

Railway station in Indonesia

Gunung Putri Station Stasiun Gunung Putri
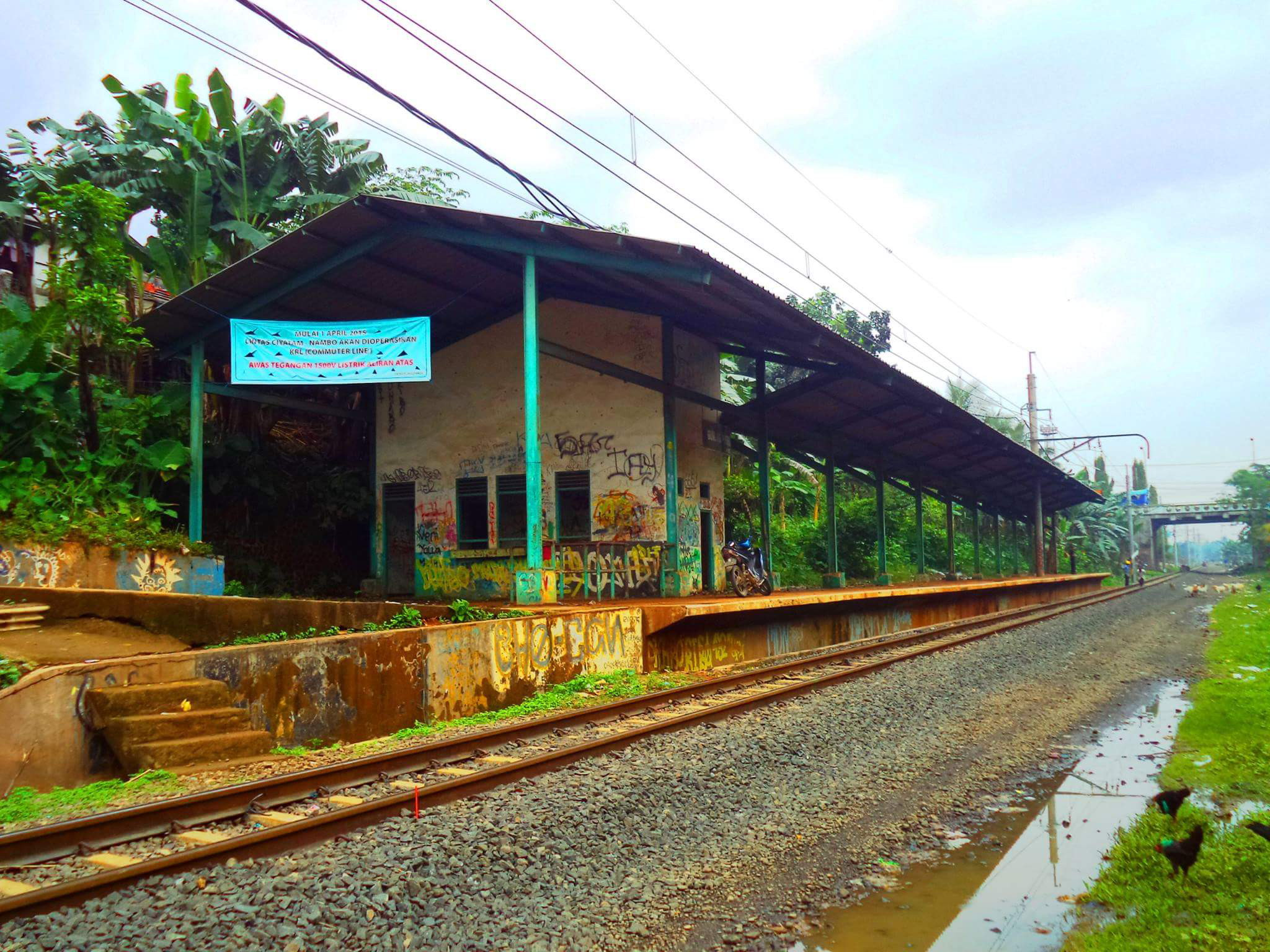
- View of the blighted station

General information
- Location: Jl. Raya Mayor Oking, Gunung Putri, Bogor Regency 16961; West Java; Indonesia
- Coordinates: 6.4719°S 106.8887°E
- Elevation: +115 m (377 ft)
- Owner: Kereta Api Indonesia
- Operator: KAI Commuter (future)
- Lines: Citayam-Nambo railway; Bogor Line (future)
- Platforms: 1 side platform
- Tracks: 1

Construction
- Structure type: Ground
- Accessible: Available

Other information
- Status: Inactive
- Station code: GPI
- Classification: Halt

History
- Opened: 1997
- Closed: 2006
- Electrified: 2012

Services
Preceding station	Following station
Commuter Line Bogor does not stop here
Location
- Location within Bogor Regency

Gunung Putri Station is an inactive railway station located in Gunung Putri, Bogor Regency, West Java, Indonesia. The station is located at an elevation of +115 m. It is included in the Operation Area I Jakarta.

The origins of the construction of this station can be traced to the master plan for the construction of the Jakarta Outer Ring Railway line made by the Ministry of Transportation of the Republic of Indonesia in the early 1990s. The goal is that freight trains do not enter the Special Capital Region of Jakarta area. The route is from Parung Panjang Station to Cikarang Station. However, the 1997 Asian financial crisis caused the plan to stop halfway, so the rail line only reached Nambo station. To fill this empty route slot, the Nambo diesel multiple unit (Indonesian: Kereta Rel Diesel or KRD) line was operated from 1999 to 2006. In 2006, the KRD line stopped operating because the DMUs was old and unfit for operation. Automatically, all stations and tracks were also deactivated.

Although not servicing passengers, there is a surprise market (lit. 'Pasar Kaget') located right above the station. It opens every Friday. Since 2013, the Nambo Line has begun to be activated for cement transport trains, but the KRL Commuter Line has only existed since 2015. Even though currently there is a Commuterline service to Nambo Station, the Gunung Putri station has not yet been activated. The surprise market in the station yard still exists even though the KRL is operating normally. However, trading activities at this station were permanently closed on 5 March 2021.

== Intermodal support ==
This station is very strategic compared to the Nambo station, there are 4 public transportation routes (angkot lit. 'angkutan kota') that is 38, 64, 73 and 74.

Preceding station	Kereta Api Indonesia	Following station
Cibinong towards Citayam	Citayam–Nambo	Nambo; Terminus
