= Klapanunggal =

- Town and District
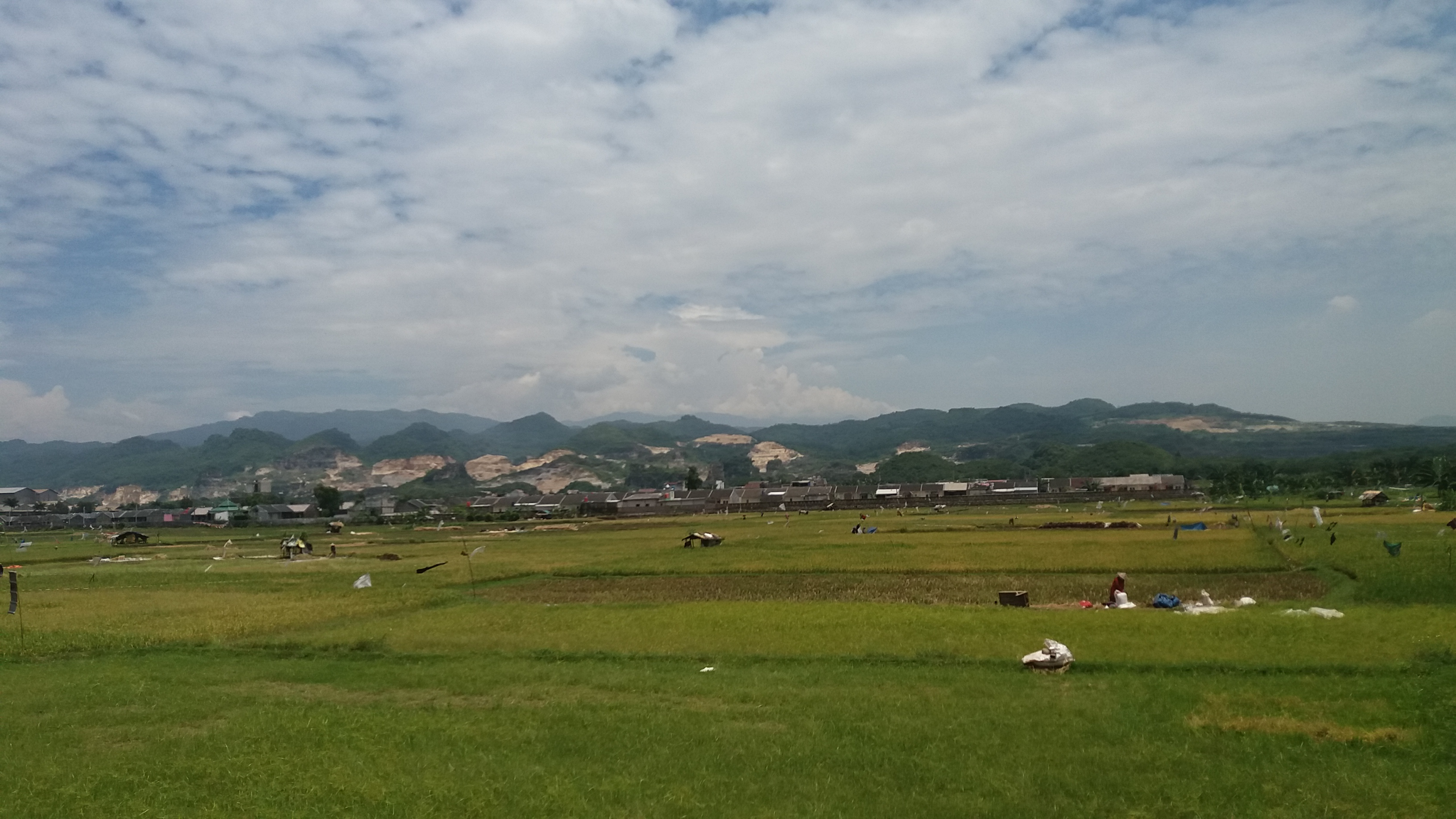
- Karst hills near Klapanunggal

- Location in Bogor Regency, Java and Indonesia Klapanunggal (Java) Klapanunggal (Indonesia)
- Coordinates: 6.452038°S 106.956940°E
- Country: Indonesia
- Province: West Java
- Regency: Bogor Regency
- Established: 15 June 2001 (Regional expansion from Cileungsi)

Area
  - Total: 95.61 km^{2} (36.92 sq mi)
- Elevation: 145 m (476 ft)
- Highest elevation: 730 m (2,400 ft)
- Lowest elevation: 113 m (371 ft)

Population (mid 2025 estimate)
  - Total: 145,371
  - Density: 1,520/km^{2} (3,938/sq mi)
- Time zone: UTC+7 (IWST)
- Area code: (+62) 251
- Vehicle registration: F
- Villages: 9
- Website: kecamatankelapanunggal.bogorkab.go.id

Klapanunggal or Kelapanunggal is a town and an administrative district (Indonesian: Kecamatan) in the Bogor Regency, West Java, Indonesia. The town is located 50 km to the southeast of Jakarta. The district is part of the Greater Jakarta metropolitan area, and covers a land area of 95.61 km^{2}. It had a population of 95,025 at the 2010 Census and 127,561 at the 2020 Census; the official estimate as at mid 2025 was 145,371 (comprising 74,057 males and 71,314 females). The district centre is at the town of Kembang Kuning, and the district is sub-divided into nine villages (desa), all sharing the postcode of 16710, as listed below with their areas and populations as at mid 2025.

Kode Wilayah	Name of kelurahan or desa	Area in km^{2}	Population mid 2025 estimate
32.01.32.2008	Leuwikaret	18.99	8,706
32.01.32.2004	Lulut	4.14	18,397
32.01.32.2007	Bantar Jati	2.88	9,600
32.01.32.2003	Nambo	14.23	12,078
32.01.32.2006	Kembang Kuning	5.91	18,085
32.01.32.2001	Klapanunggal (town)	14.37	28,702
32.01.32.2009	Ligarmukti	22.02	4,021
32.01.32.2002	Bojong	7.47	18,072
32.01.32.2005	Cikahuripan	5.60	27,710
32.01.32	Totals	95.61	145,371

The district is home to an industrial area that is part of a larger industrial site that also covers various districts in the same regency, including Gunung Putri and Cileungsi.

Because of the industrial area, Klapanunggal is also home to a stable balanced population between local factory/industrial workers, and commuters to the Greater Jakarta area. As a result, from having a rather large number of commuters, the town has Nambo station as a station that connects the town with the local commuter rail, KRL Jabodetabek.

== History ==
Klapanunggal District was established on 15 June 2001 from what was formerly the southern part of Cileungsi district.
