= Cibinong railway station =

Railway station in Indonesia

b24 Cibinong Station Stasiun Cibinong
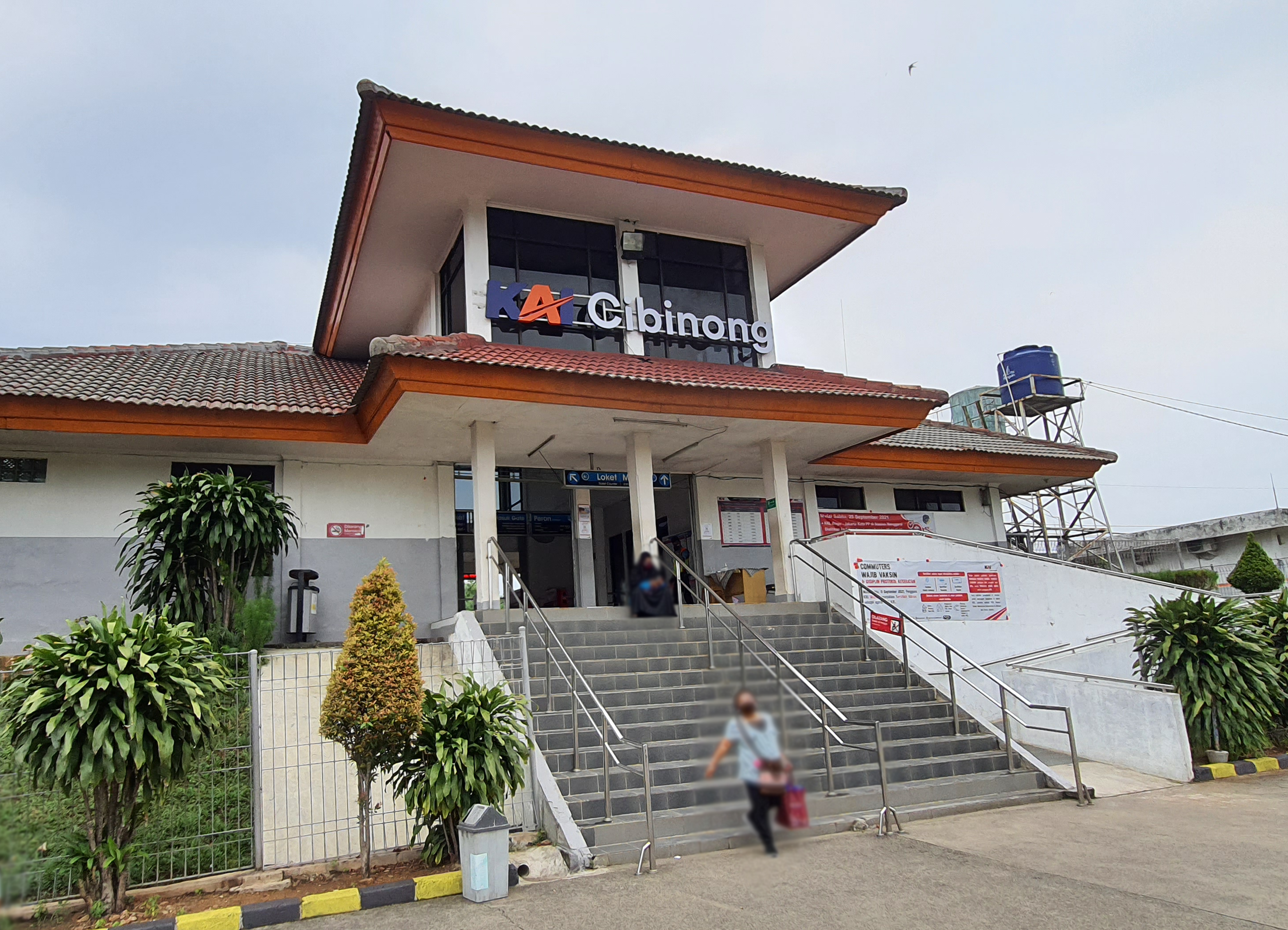
- Cibinong station building, 2021

General information
- Location: Jl. Pabuaran, Cibinong, Bogor Regency 16916; West Java; Indonesia
- Coordinates: 6.4642°S 106.8525°E
- Elevation: +121 m (397 ft)
- Owner: Kereta Api Indonesia
- Operator: KAI Commuter
- Lines: Citayam-Nambo railway; Bogor Line
- Platforms: 1 side platform
- Tracks: 2

Construction
- Structure type: Embankment
- Parking: Available
- Cycle facilities: Available
- Accessible: Available

Other information
- Station code: CBN
- Classification: Class III

History
- Opened: 1997; 1 April 2015 (reopened)
- Closed: 2006–2015
- Electrified: 2012

Services
Preceding station		Following station
Pondok Rajeg towards Jakarta Kota	Commuter Line Bogor Jakarta Kota–Nambo, vice versa.	Nambo Terminus
Location
- Location within Bogor Regency

Cibinong Station (CBN) is a railway station located in Pabuaran, Cibinong, Bogor Regency, West Java.The station is located at an altitude of +121 meters, and is included in the Operation Area I Jakarta. Not far from the station (6 km) is located an international Pakansari Stadium.

The origins of the construction of this station can be traced to the master plan for the construction of the Jakarta Outer Ring Railway line made by the Ministry of Transportation of the Republic of Indonesia in the early 1990s. The goal is that freight trains do not enter the Special Capital Region of Jakarta area. The route is from Parung Panjang Station to Cikarang Station. However, the 1997 Asian financial crisis caused the plan to stop halfway, so the rail line only reached Nambo station. To fill this empty route slot, the Nambo diesel multiple unit (Indonesian: Kereta Rel Diesel or KRD) line was operated from 1999 to 2006. In 2006, the KRD line stopped operating because the DMUs was old and unfit for operation. Automatically, all stations and tracks were also deactivated.

After being inactive for several years, PT KAI decided to reactivate this line station considering that this line is a strategic railroad line and is close to the largest industrial areas in Bogor, namely Cibinong and Gunung Putri. This line is also installed with an overhead line, so that if this line is active again, the KRL Commuterline can serve it. This line is passed by freight trains which began operating on 4 December 2013. This station began serving KRL Commuterline with the Nambo–Angke route on 1 April 2015. The station is now served by a branch service of Bogor Line that branches of Citayam since network's overhaul on 28 May 2022.

== Building and layout ==
This station has two railway tracks, with line 1 as a straight track.

b24
P Platform floor	Line 2	Additional line for rail switching
P Platform floor	Line 1	← (Pondok Rajeg) Bogor Line to Nambo and to Jakarta Kota (Nambo) →
P Platform floor	Side platform, the doors are opened on the right side
G	Main building

== Services ==
The following is a list of train services at the Cibinong Station.

=== Passenger services ===
- KAI Commuter
  - Bogor Line (Nambo branch), to Jakarta Kota and Nambo

Preceding station	Kereta Api Indonesia	Following station
Pondok Rajeg towards Citayam	Citayam–Nambo	~~Gunung Putri~~ towards Nambo
