= Pondok Rajeg railway station =

Railway station in Indonesia

b23 Pondok Rajeg Station Stasiun Pondok Rajeg
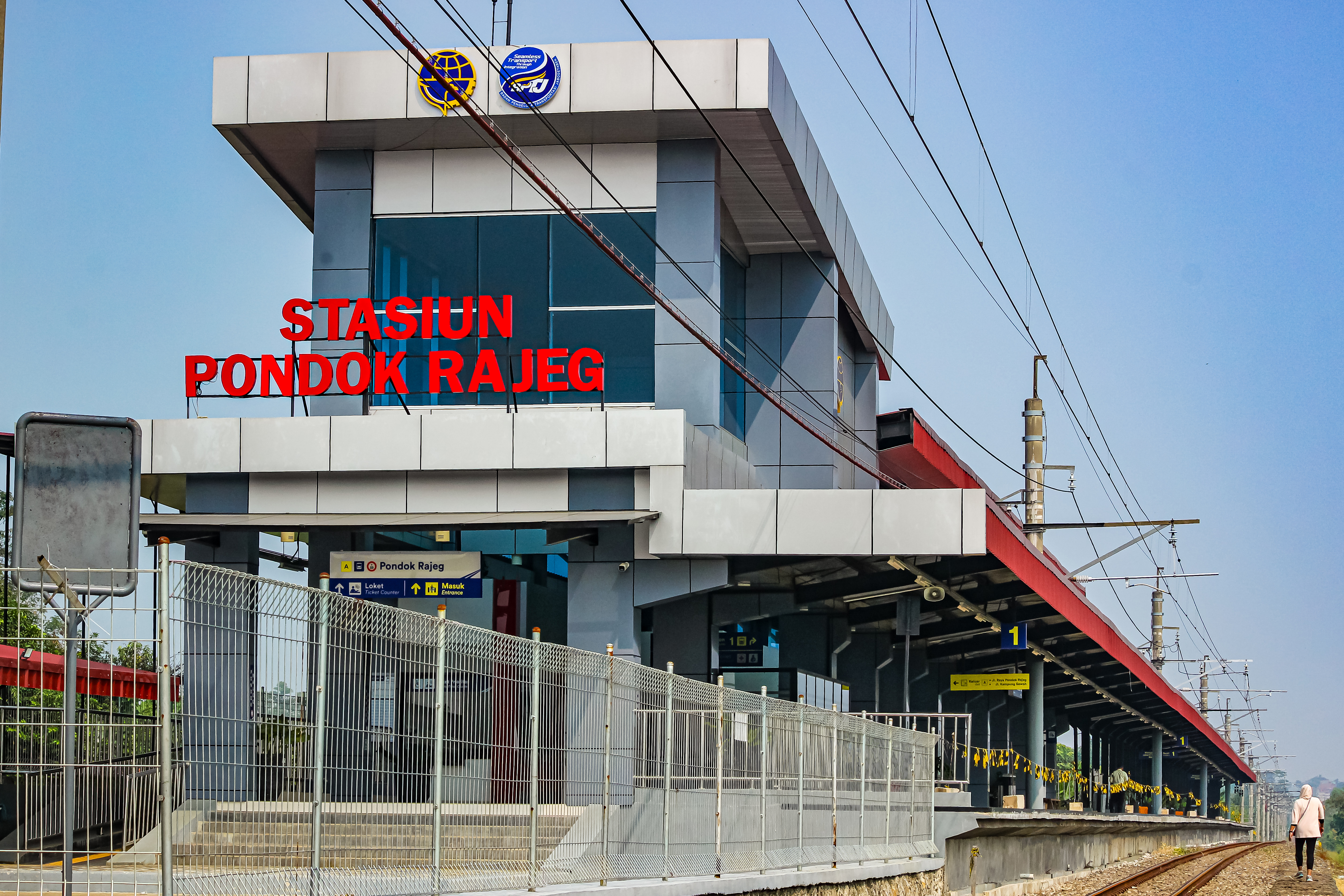
- The new building of Pondok Rajeg Station after revitalization

General information
- Location: Jalan Raya Pondok Rajeg, Jatimulya, Cilodong, Depok, 16472; West Java; Indonesia
- Coordinates: 6°27′39″S 106°49′27″E
- Elevation: +121 m (397 ft)
- Owner: Kereta Api Indonesia
- Operator: KAI Commuter
- Lines: Citayam-Nambo railway; Bogor Line
- Platforms: 1 side platform
- Tracks: 1

Construction
- Structure type: At-grade
- Parking: Available
- Accessible: Yes

Other information
- Station code: PDRG
- Classification: Halt

History
- Opened: 1997; 19 October 2024 (reopened)
- Closed: 2006–2024
- Rebuilt: 12 June 2022
- Electrified: 2012

Services
Preceding station		Following station
Citayam towards Jakarta Kota	Commuter Line Bogor Jakarta Kota–Nambo, vice versa.	Cibinong towards Nambo
Location
- Location within Depok

Pondok Rajeg Station (PDRG) is a railway station located on Jatimulya, Cilodong, Depok City in West Java, Indonesia. The station, which is located at an altitude of +121 meters, is included in Operational Area I Jakarta.

== History ==
The origins of the construction of this station can be traced to the master plan for the construction of the Jakarta Outer Ring Railway line made by the Ministry of Transportation in the early 1990s. The goal is that freight trains would not enter the Special Capital Region of Jakarta area. The route is from Parung Panjang Station to Cikarang Station. However, the 1997 Asian financial crisis caused the plan to stop halfway, and so the rail line only reached Nambo station. To fill this empty route slot, the Nambo diesel multiple unit (Indonesian: Kereta Rel Diesel or KRD) line was operated from 1999 to 2006. In 2006, the KRD line stopped operating because the DMUs was old and unfit for operation. Automatically, all stations and tracks were also deactivated.

After the deactivation, Pondok Rajeg Station fell into disrepair. It was in a dilapidated, deplorable and unkempt condition since 2013 and the entire station was full of vandalism. At night, the station were often used as a place to hang out while enjoying the KRL and Nambo cement trains passing by.

On 3 June 2021, the Jabodetabek Transportation Management Agency (Indonesian: Badan Pengelola Transportasi Jabodetabek or BPTJ) along with the head of the Departement of Transportation of Depok (Kadishub Kota Depok) and the representatives of the Depok City Government carried out a field study as an effort to follow up on the reactivation of the station. Starting the rebuilding process, the old building and station platform have been demolished since 12 June 2022 and rebuilding finally completed in 2023.

After fulfilling all permits and carrying out various technical requirement tests, Pondok Rajeg Station was officially re-opened on October 19, 2024 by KAI Commuter through a symbolic inauguration by Indonesian Ministry of Transportation, Budi Karya Sumadi, Director General of Railways, Head of BPTJ, Mayor of Depok, and various other high-ranking officials.

== Station layout ==
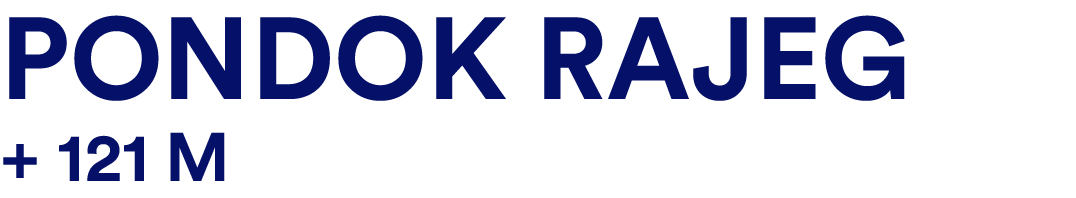
b23
P Platform floor	Line 1	← (Citayam)	Bogor Line to Jakarta Kota and Nambo	(Cibinong) →
P Platform floor	Side platform, the doors are opened on the right/left side
P Platform floor	G	Main building

== Supporting transportation ==
Public transport type	Line	Destination
Angkot	F72	Terminal Cibinong-Kampung Sawah

Preceding station	Kereta Api Indonesia	Following station
Citayam; Terminus	Citayam–Nambo	Cibinong towards Nambo
