= Mampang =

Mampang may refer to:

- Mampang Prapatan, Indonesia
- Steve Jackson's Sorcery!#Plot
- Mampang, a kelurahan of Pancoran Mas in Indonesia
