= Depok Baru railway station =

Railway station in Indonesia

B20 Depok Baru Station Stasiun Depok Baru
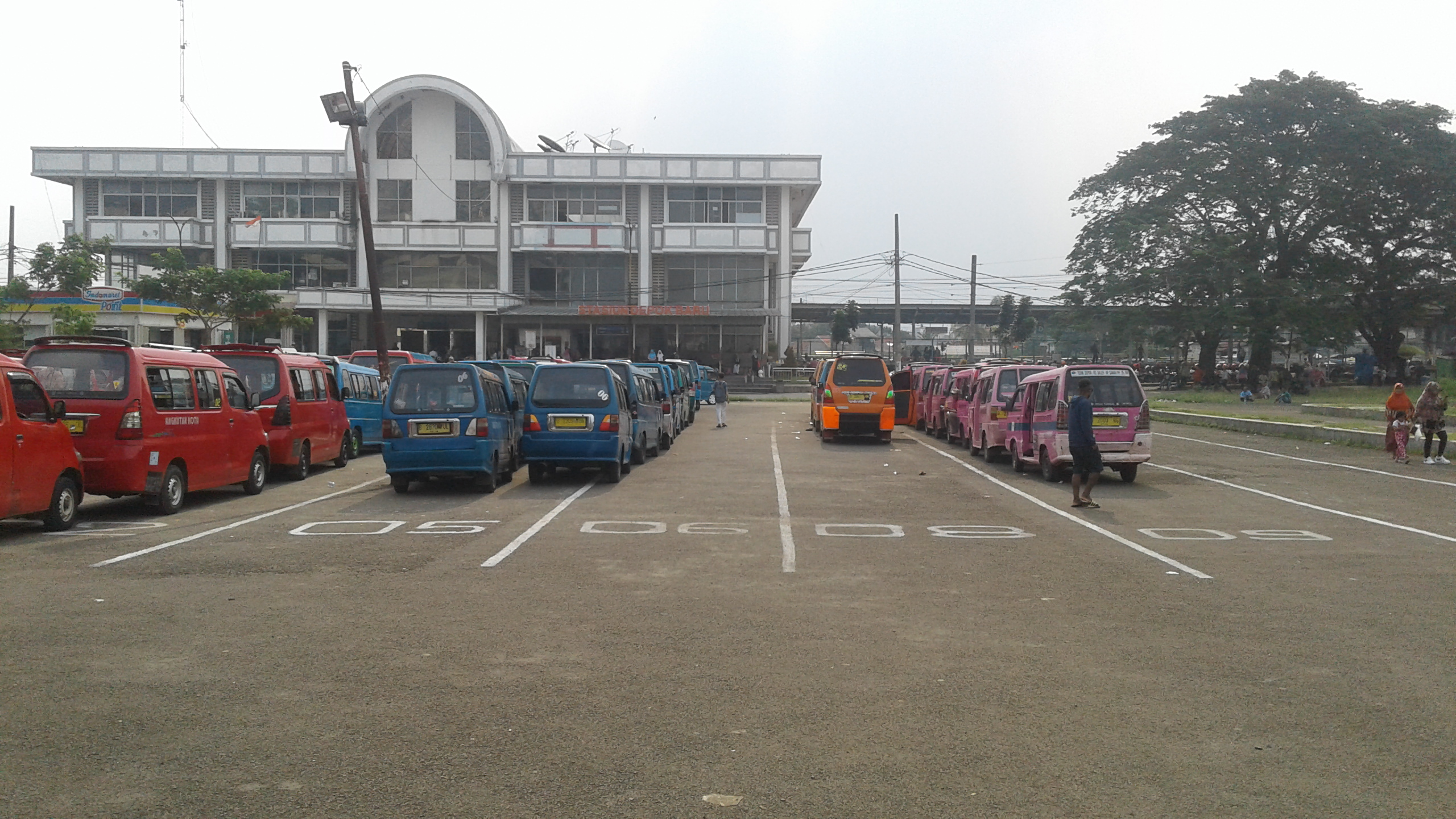
- The station facade, 2017

General information
- Location: Jalan Stasiun Depok Baru (west entrance access), Depok, Pancoran Mas, Depok, West Java 16431, Indonesia
- Elevation: +93m
- Line: Bogor Line
- Platforms: Two side platforms; One island platform
- Tracks: 3

Construction
- Parking: Available

Other information
- Station code: DPB
- Classification: Class I

History
- Opened: c. 1986
- Rebuilt: 1992

Services
Preceding station		Following station
Pondok Cina towards Jakarta Kota	Commuter Line Bogor	Depok towards Bogor or Nambo
Location

Depok Baru Station (DPB) or commonly known as Margonda Station is a class I railway station in Pancoran Mas, Depok, West Java, Indonesia, serving only KRL Commuterline services. It is located +93m above sea level, and is located precisely behind Depok City Hall, ITC Depok shopping mall, and the Margonda Depok Bus Terminal, which is opposite the Depok City Police headquarters.

The inauguration date of the Depok Baru Station is unknown, but it was reported that it was almost finished in early 1986, and was renovated in 1992.

== History ==
Depok Baru station (initially Depok Jaya) was built to supplement the existing Depok station, as well as providing railway access to residents of Depok I and Depok II residential areas developed by Perumnas, with land clearing process completed around mid-January 1983. On 19 February 1983, the station's construction was officially broke ground, and the ceremony was attended by then Indonesian Transportation Minister Roesmin Noerjadin. On 13 February 1986, the newspaper Berita Yudha reported that the physical construction of Depok Baru station was almost finished. However, the exact date of its opening remained unknown.

Since 25 March 2021, this station, along with Bekasi, Tanah Abang, Kranji, Depok, Jakarta Kota, Bojong Gede, Citayam, Parung Panjang, and Angke stations has officially ceased the sale of single trip cards (Guaranteed Daily Ticket (Indonesian: Tiket Harian Berjaminan or THB)) for KRL Commuterline services. This is because the majority of KRL Commuterline passengers are used to using multi-trip cards and electronic money. In this way, long queues to buy KRL tickets can be cut.

== Building and layout ==
This station has three railway lines with lines 1 and 3 as a straight track. This station has access to the crossing via the top which is located in the middle of the platform, but is no longer used because access to the crossing is now via the pedestrian tunnel.

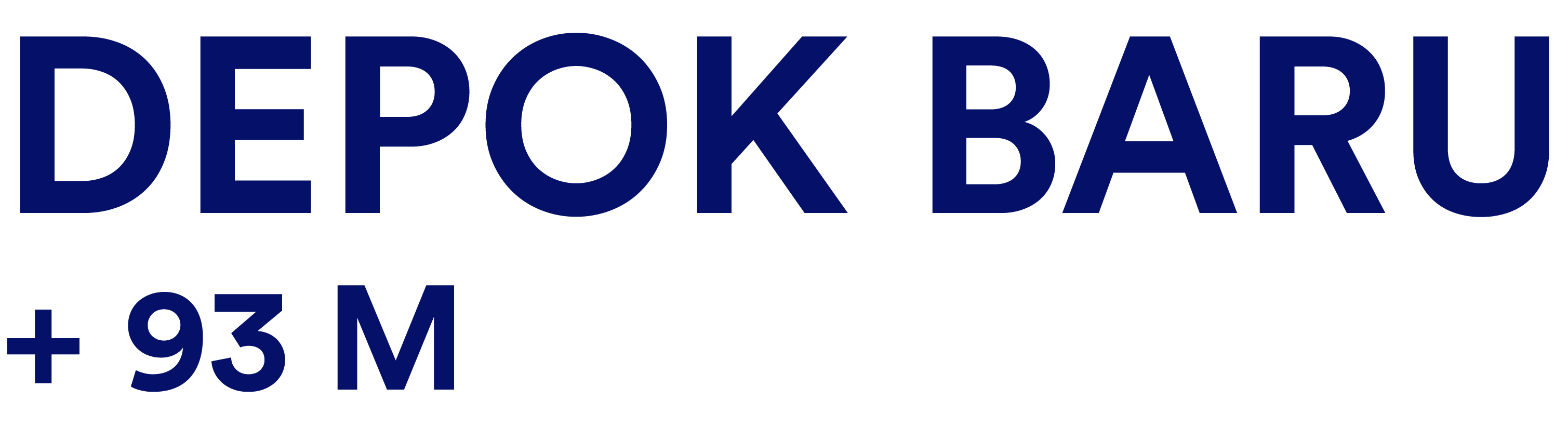
B20
G	Main building
P Platform floor	Side platform, the doors are opened on the right side
P Platform floor	Line 1	←(Pondok Cina)	Bogor Line to Jakarta Kota
P Platform floor	Line 2	← (Pondok Cina)	Bogor Line to Jakarta Kota or Bogor or Nambo	(Depok) →
P Platform floor	Island platform (non-passenger)
P Platform floor	Line 3		Bogor Line to Depok/Bogor	(Depok) →
P Platform floor	Side platform, the doors are opened on the right side
P Platform floor	G	Main building

== Services ==
=== Passenger services ===
==== KRL Commuterline ====
Train line name	Destination	Notes
Bogor Line	Jakarta Kota	-
Bogor Line	Bogor	-
Bogor Line	Nambo	Only a few trips

== Supporting transportation ==
Type	Route	Destination
TransJakarta	(non-BRT)	Depok Bus Terminal–BKN (integrated with corridors)
Trans Depok (BRT)	1	Depok Bus Terminal–Harjamukti LRT Station (via Tole Iskandar-Raya Bogor) (integrated with)
Hiba Utama	-	Depok Bus Terminal–Soekarno–Hatta International Airport (via Cinere–Jagorawi Toll Road–Jagorawi Toll Road–Jakarta Outer Ring Road)
Transjabodetabek (regular)	DJ1	Depok Bus Terminal–Lebak Bulus Grab MRT station (via Margonda–Lenteng Agung Raya–T.B. Simatupang)
Transjabodetabek (regular)	DJ2	Depok Bus Terminal–Kalideres Bus Terminal (via T.B. Simatupang–Metro Pondok Indah–Sultan Iskandar Muda–Daan Mogot)
Angkot	D01	Depok Bus Terminal–Depok I
Angkot	D02	Depok Bus Terminal–Depok II
Angkot	D03	Depok Bus Terminal–Parung
Angkot	D04	Depok Bus Terminal–Kukusan
Angkot	D05	Depok Bus Terminal–Bojonggede Station (via Citayam Raya)
Angkot	D06	Depok Bus Terminal–Simpangan–Jatijajar Bus Terminal
Angkot	D07	Depok Bus Terminal–Citayam Bus Terminal
Angkot	D07A	Depok Bus Terminal–Rangkapan Jaya Baru
Angkot	D08	Depok Bus Terminal–BBM–Kampung Sawah Bus Terminal
Angkot	D09	Depok Bus Terminal–Raden Saleh–Kampung Sawah Bus Terminal
Angkot	D10	Depok Bus Terminal–Parung Serab–Kampung Sawah Bus Terminal
Angkot	D10A	Depok Bus Terminal–GDC Boulevard–Jatijajar Bus Terminal (upcoming)
Angkot	D11	Depok Bus Terminal–Akses UI–Tugu
Angkot	D15	Depok Bus Terminal–Limo
Angkot	D105	Depok Bus Terminal–Tanah Baru–Pondok Labu, South Jakarta
Angkot	D110	Depok Bus Terminal–Krukut–Cinere
Angkot	D112	Depok Bus Terminal–Kampung Rambutan Bus Terminal
Angkot	S16	Depok Bus Terminal–Grogol, Depok–Pondok Labu, South Jakarta
Angkot	T19	Depok Bus Terminal–Lenteng Agung–Kampung Rambutan Bus Terminal
Angkot	M03	Depok Bus Terminal–Pasar Minggu Bus Terminal
Angkot	M04	Taman Merdeka Depok Timur–Pasar Minggu Bus Terminal

== Incidents ==
- On 29 April 2017, a female doctor was killed by a KRL train bound for Bogor. According to the testimonies of a number of witnesses, this incident was caused by the woman not heeding the KRL service officer's warning not to cross through the station emplacement. As a result, the KRL immediately crashed the female doctor.
- On 2 May 2022, there was a fire in the Pasar Kemiri Depok area, causing disruption to the Depok Baru-Bogor/Nambo KRL trips and the opposite direction because the electricity on the overhead power lines was cut. The fire that occurred at 19.05 WIB was successfully extinguished by the Depok Fire Department and the overhead line could only be repaired at 21.03 WIB.

== Gallery ==
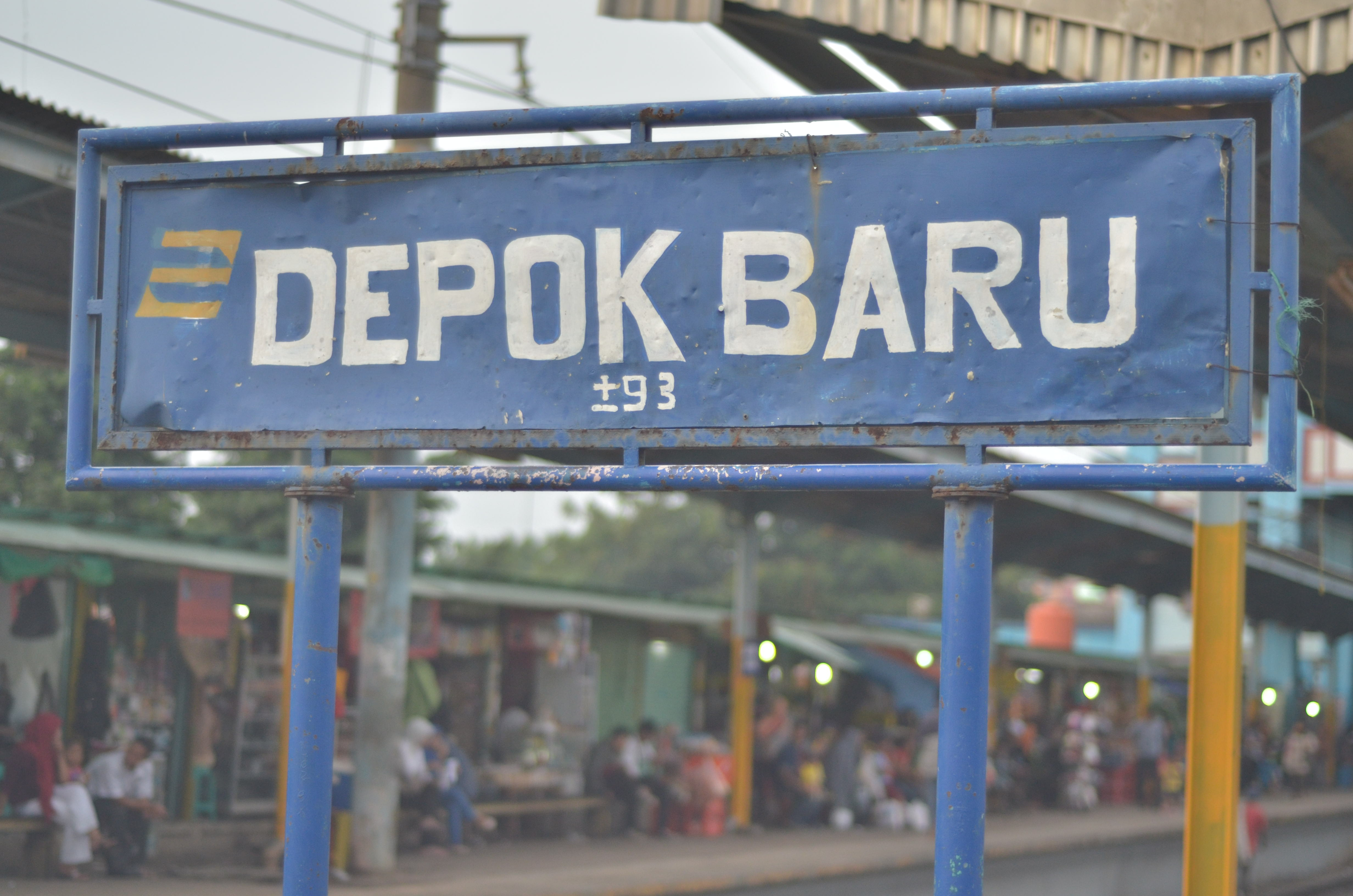
The signage of the station (2012)

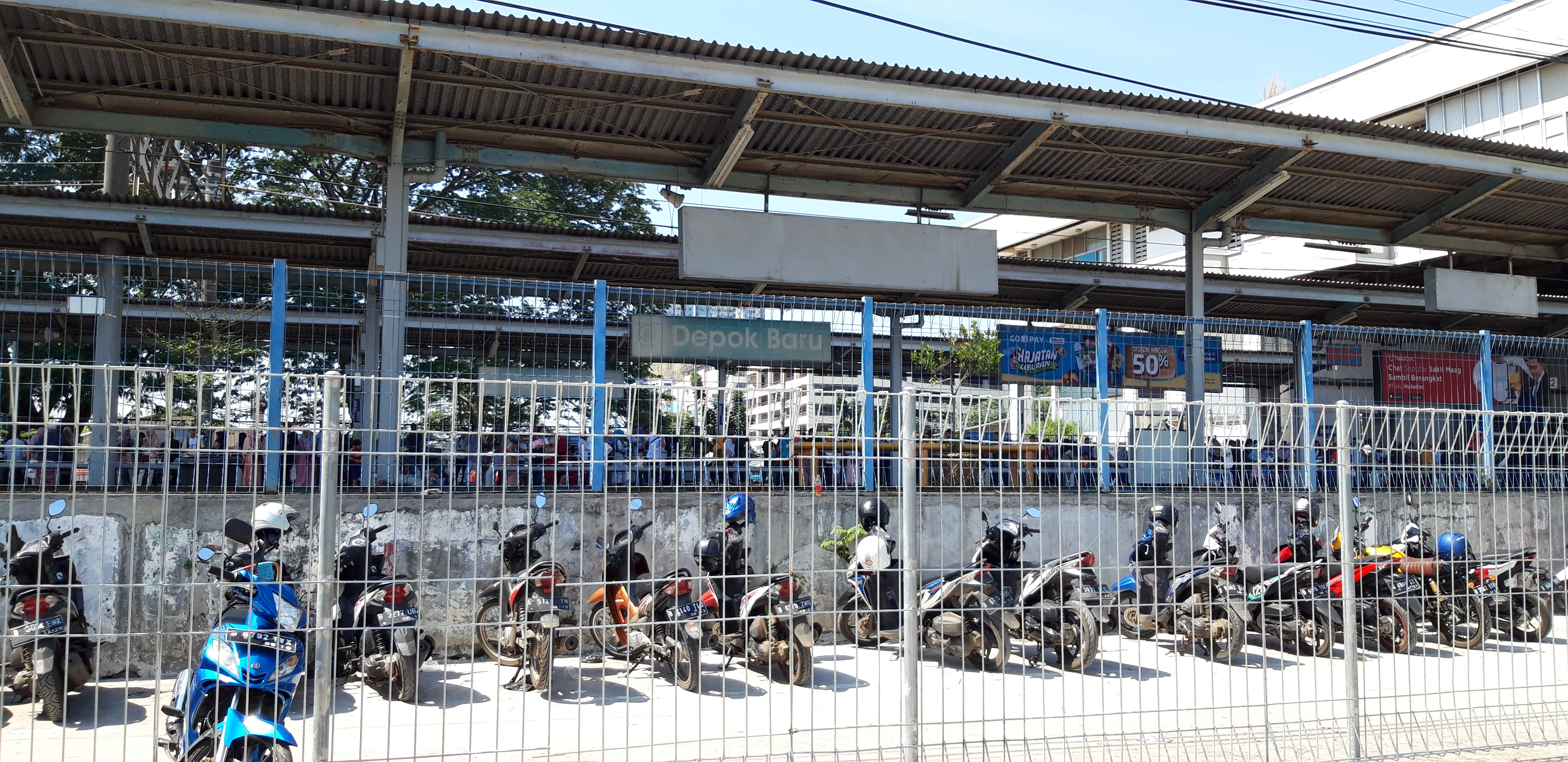
The motorcycle parking lot of the station

Preceding station	Kereta Api Indonesia	Following station
Pondok Cina towards Manggarai	Manggarai–Padalarang	Depok towards Padalarang
