= Mekarsari Fruitgarden =

Park in Cileungsi, Indonesia

Mekarsari Fruitgarden and Recreation Park
- Taman Buah Mekarsari
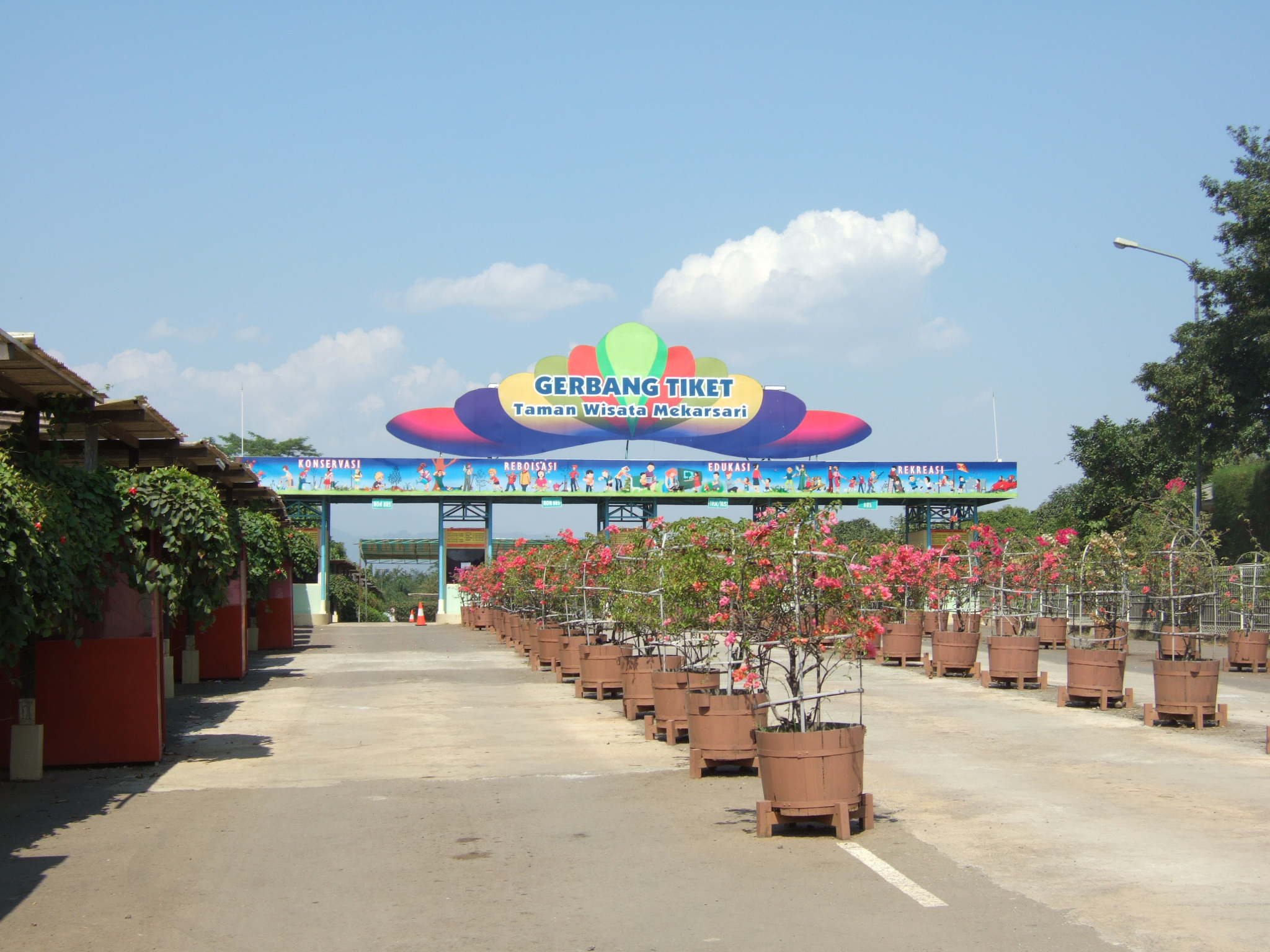
- Entrance

- Location within Bogor Regency
- Location: Cileungsi, Bogor Regency, West Java, Indonesia
- Nearest city: Bekasi, Depok
- Coordinates: 6.416°S 106.984°E
- Website: www.mekarsari.com

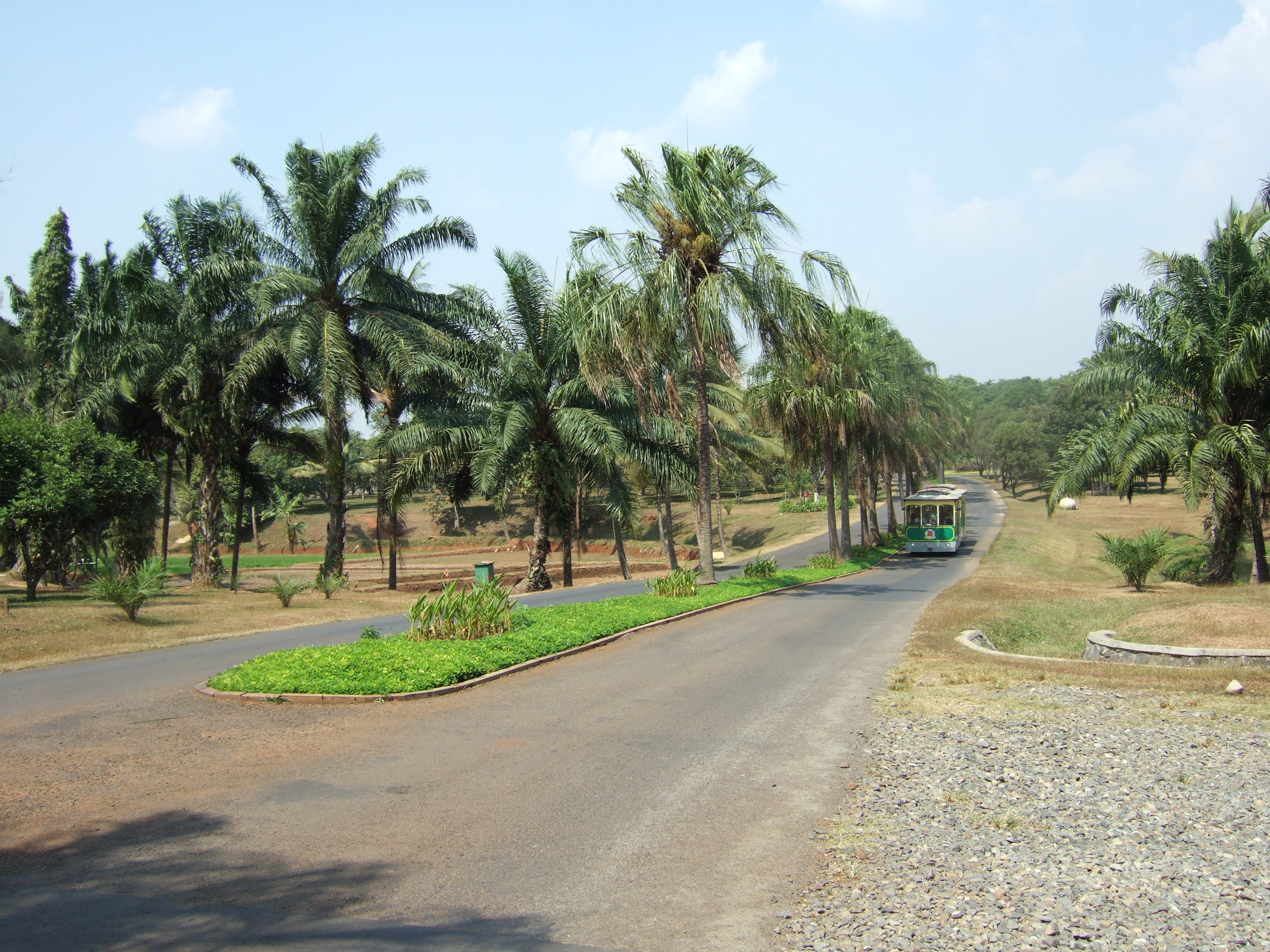
Inside of Mekarsari park

Mekarsari Fruitgarden, or Taman Buah Mekarsari, is a biodiversity conservation center of tropical fruits, from all regions in Indonesia and other parts of the world. This is a place of cultivation research, breeding and propagation of superior seeds and then disseminated to farmers and the general public. The park is located at Mekarsari Cileungsi, Bogor, Indonesia. The park is about 25 km south of city center of Jakarta but within Greater Jakarta metropolitan area. Park area is about of 264 hectares, which is equipped tourist facilities for domestic and foreign tourists.

== Facilities ==
A tour in the middle of the fruit garden is supported by various types of rides that bring visitors close to the nature. Facilities include, a recreation Lake/Water park of 25 hectares, Baby Zoo, Deer Leopard, Garden Center, Greenhouse Melon, Coconut Outbound, Carrion Flower, Kids Fun Valley, observation tower, Waterfall Building, Pongo show, Three Dimensional trick Art museum and House of Hobbit.Theater of Science with Professor Durio is an educational science show with the theme of fruit and food in the theater.

== History ==
The park was temporarily closed for renovation and opened again in February, 2014.

== See also ==
- Cileungsi
