= Cileungsi =

- Town and District
- Location in Bogor Regency, Java and Indonesia Cileungsi (Java) Cileungsi (Indonesia)
- Coordinates: 6.402664°S 106.980053°E
- Country: Indonesia
- Province: West Java
- Regency: Bogor Regency

Area
  - Total: 73.76 km^{2} (28.48 sq mi)
- Elevation: 110 m (360 ft)
- Highest elevation: 178 m (584 ft)
- Lowest elevation: 55 m (180 ft)

Population (mid 2025 estimate)
  - Total: 297,845
  - Density: 4,038/km^{2} (10,460/sq mi)
- Time zone: UTC+7 (IWST)
- Area code: (+62) 251
- Vehicle registration: F
- Villages: 12
- Website: kecamatancileungsi.bogorkab.go.id

Cileungsi is a town and an administrative district (Indonesian: kecamatan) in the Bogor Regency, West Java, Indonesia. The town is a suburb located southeast of Jakarta, south of the city of Bekasi, east of Depok and is part of its metropolitan region - Jabodetabek (or Jakarta Raya). The distance between Cileungsi and Jakarta is 37.7 km (23.4 miles).

The district covers an area of 73.76 km km^{2}, and had a population of 276,369 at the 2010 Census and 288,347 at the 2020 Census; the official estimate as at mid 2025 was 297,845 (comprising 150,044 males and 147,801 females). The administrative centre is located at the town of Cileungsi, and the district is sub-divided into twelve villages (desa), all sharing the postcode of 16820, as listed below with their areas and their populations as at mid 2025.

Kode Wilayah	Name of Desa	Area in km^{2}	Population mid 2025 estimate
32.01.07.2004	Dayeuh	11.84	38,324
32.01.07.2003	Mampir	6.01	19,793
32.01.07.2009	Situsari	6.25	24,286
32.01.07.2008	Cipeucang	4.41	13,298
32.01.07.2006	Jatisari	4.69	9,843
32.01.07.2005	Gandoang	6.40	20,260
32.01.07.2002	Mekarsari	5.73	13,151
32.01.07.2007	Cileungsi Kidul	6.22	38,066
32.01.07.2012	Cileungsi (town)	4.35	24,653
32.01.07.2011	Limusnunggal	7.16	30,412
32.01.07.2001	Pasir Angin	5.79	41,670
32.01.07.2010	Cipenjo	4.91	24,089
32.01.07	Totals	73.76	297,845

Like much of the northern part of the Bogor Regency, the district is largely made up of huge industrial parks and areas, along with many warehouses and factories, making it a huge contribution to the district's industry.

Asides from industrial areas, Cileungsi is also populated by many commuters, and can be considered a bedroom community. It features a lot of real estate housing, combined with another housing area to the west, called Cibubur, which lies mainly in the adjoining Gunung Putri District. As a matter of fact, the housing area of Cibubur itself is beginning to extend into Cileungsi's boundaries, starting from the early-2000s.

The eastern portion of Cileungsi is home to a huge recreational park, featuring large gardens with tropical plants and plantations, as well as a waterpark, Taman Wisata Mekarsari.

== Notable people ==
- Oking Jaya Atmaja, Indonesian military officer
