= Depok Lama =

Central area in Depok City, West Java

Depok Lama (Indonesian for Old Depok) at this period is one of the regions in the City of Depok. On the other hand, Depok Lama is the region boundary between the City of Depok and Bogor Regency. Renold Joseph said, "At the Dutch periode, the majority of inhabitants in Depok Lama is those Twelve Family names that received inheritance from Cornelis Chastelein." Those Twelve Families are Bacas, Isakh, Jonathans, Jacob, Joseph, Loen, Laurens, Leander, Tholonse, Soedira, Samuel, and Zadokh. Now, one of those Twelve Families doesn't have a man generation (patrilineal culture) that is Zadokh Family. Nowadays, Depok Lama still showing the existence, because those Twelve Family having the good sensitivity with those cultural values.

Nowadays Depok Lama area lies at the center of the City of Depok.

75 percent of colonial buildings in Depok have been destroyed to build residences and commercial buildings. Therefore, Alqiz Lukman, Ghilman Assilmi, and Ide Nada Imandiharja created the Depok Lama Project website to preserve the history of Depok Lama digitally, which consists of audio recordings of interviews with Yayasan Lembaga Cornelis Chastelein (YLCC, Cornelis Chastelein Foundation), local elders, the descendants of Chastelein’s slaves, heritage experts, and historians as well as photographs.
