= Oking Jaya Atmaja =

Raden Oking Jaya Atmaja
- Born: c. 1918; Cileungsi, Dutch East Indies
- Died: 7 October 1963 (aged 44–45)
- Children: 6
- Military career
- Allegiance: Indonesia (1945-1963)
- Branch: Indonesian Army
- Service years: 1945-1963
- Rank: Major
- Conflicts: Indonesian National Revolution; Madiun Affair; Darul Islam rebellion

Major Raden Oking Jaya Atmaja (EVO: Oking Djaja Atmadja, 1918–1963), known as Mayor Oking, was a military officer and an Indonesian independence fighter.

== Early life ==
Oking was born in Cileungsi in 1918 to a noble family. His father, Raden Enjoeh Djayaatmadja, came from Kampung Loji, Cibarusah, and his mother, R. Nenden, was from Cileungsi.

During his childhood, Oking was known for his strong leadership, where he often became the leader when playing with his peers. As he entered his teenage years, Oking worked as a tax collector until the Japanese occupation in 1942.

== Military career ==
=== 1945 - 1949 ===
After the proclamation of Indonesia's independence, Oking joined the Siliwangi Division and became a Company Commander. He led his troops against the British forces when they attempted to attack Sukabumi through Pelabuhan Ratu and successfully drove them back. In addition, he launched guerrilla attacks on the NICA forces stationed in Kampung Loji. His actions made him a NICA's fugitive.

In 1948, Oking was stationed in Cibatu and later moved with his troops to Yogyakarta. He then led his troops in suppressing the 1948 PKI Rebellion. On 13 September 1948, at 10:00 AM, Oking's troops were attacked by PKI rebels at Solo Balapan Station. The battle lasted for four hours and resulted in the deaths of two of his soldiers. Oking sustained an injury to his right arm, which led to its amputation at a hospital in Solo. After receiving treatment, Soedirman met Oking and hugged him.

After the Dutch took control of Yogyakarta, Oking's troops, as part of the Siliwangi Division, returned to West Java on foot. Upon arriving in West Java, the Siliwangi troops were stationed in Telukjambe, Karawang.

=== 1950 - 1963 ===
On 31 December 1949, Oking was appointed as the Commander of Battalion 314/Salempada, a position he held until 5 July 1950. The position was handed over to Major Mursid. Oking also participated in operations to suppress the Darul Islam Rebellion in Mount Salak.

Oking also recommended Raden Mardjuki for the position of District Chief of Cibarusah. Thanks to his recommendation, Mardjuki was appointed as the District Chief of Cibarusah in 1951.

In 1955, Oking ran as a candidate for the Constitutional Assembly representing West Java under the Party of the League of Supporters of Indonesian Independence (IPKI). He also served as a member of the IPKI presidium, handling the general affairs in 1961.

He died on 7 October 1963 due to illness and was buried at the Dreded Heroes Cemetery in Bogor.

== Personal life ==
Oking married Oyoh Yohariah and had six children.

== Awards ==
Abdul Haris Nasution instructed the Regent of Bogor to name a street after Oking in Citeureup and Bekasi. In 1972, the Bogor Regency Regional House of Representatives approved Nasution's proposal, and Oking's name was immortalized as a street name in Bekasi and Bogor.

== Bibliography ==
- Dinas Sejarah Kodam VI/Siliwangi, Dinas Sejarah Kodam VI/Siliwangi (1979). Siliwangi dari masa ke masa. Bandung: Angkasa.
