= Citayam railway station =

Railway station in Indonesia

B22 Citayam Station Stasiun Citayam
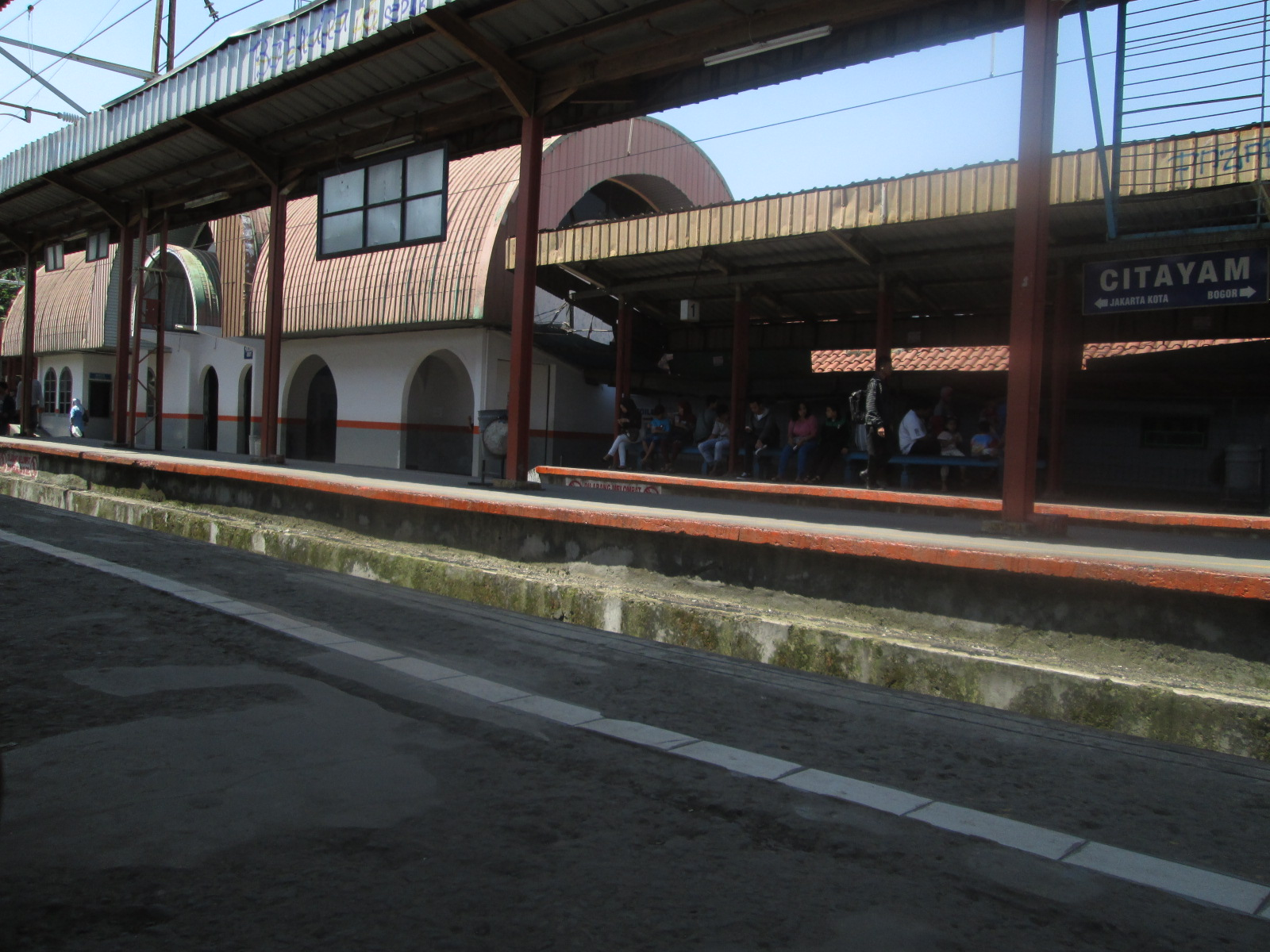
- Citayam Station

General information
- Location: Jl. Raya Citayam, Bojong Pondok Terong, Cipayung, Depok; West Java; Indonesia
- Coordinates: 6°26′55.8″S 106°48′9.1″E
- Elevation: +169 m (554 ft)
- Owner: Kereta Api Indonesia
- Operator: KAI Commuter
- Lines: Bogor Line Nambo branch; Bogor Line
- Platforms: 2 side platforms
- Tracks: 2

Construction
- Structure type: Ground
- Parking: Available
- Accessible: Available

Other information
- Station code: CTA • 0707
- Classification: Class II

History
- Opened: 31 January 1873
- Electrified: 6 April 1925
- Former names: Tjitajam Station

Services
Preceding station		Following station
Depok towards Jakarta Kota	Commuter Line Bogor Jakarta Kota–Bogor, vice versa.	Bojong Gede towards Bogor
Depok towards Jakarta Kota	Commuter Line Bogor Jakarta Kota–Nambo, vice versa.	Pondok Rajeg towards Nambo
Location
- Location within Depok

Citayam Station (CTA) is a railway station located in West Java, Indonesia; right on the border between Bojong Pondok Terong, Cipayung, Depok and Pabuaran, Bojong Gede, Bogor Regency. The station, which is located at an altitude of +120 m amsl, is owned by Operation Area I Jakarta of Kereta Api Indonesia (KAI). The north side of the station is a part of Depok, making it the southernmost station in the city, while the south side is a part Bogor Regency, making it the northernmost one in the regency.

From this station there is a branch to Nambo Station which is 12.6 km long. The line was originally created to make a loopline from Parung Panjang Station to Sungai Lagoa Station id via Cikarang Station. However, due to the 1997 Asian financial crisis and Fall of Suharto in 1998, the line was idle.

After two years, PT Kereta Api operates Manggarai–Nambo diesel multiple unit route. Unfortunately, due to outdated trains and low occupancy, the line was closed in 2006. Since 1 April 2015, the branch line to Nambo has started serving the KRL Commuterline. To the north of this station, before Depok Station, there used to be the Pondok Terong railway stop which is no longer active due to minimal occupancy and also due to the construction of the Jakarta–Bogor double track.

Since 25 March 2021 this station along with Bekasi, Tanah Abang, Kranji, Jakarta Kota, Depok, Depok Baru, Bojong Gede, Parung Panjang, and Angke stations officially ceased the sale of single-trip cards for KRL Commuterline services.

== Building and layout ==
This station has two railway tracks. Line 1 is a straight track to Manggarai, while line 2 is a straight track to Bogor. The train branching to Nambo starts from line 1.

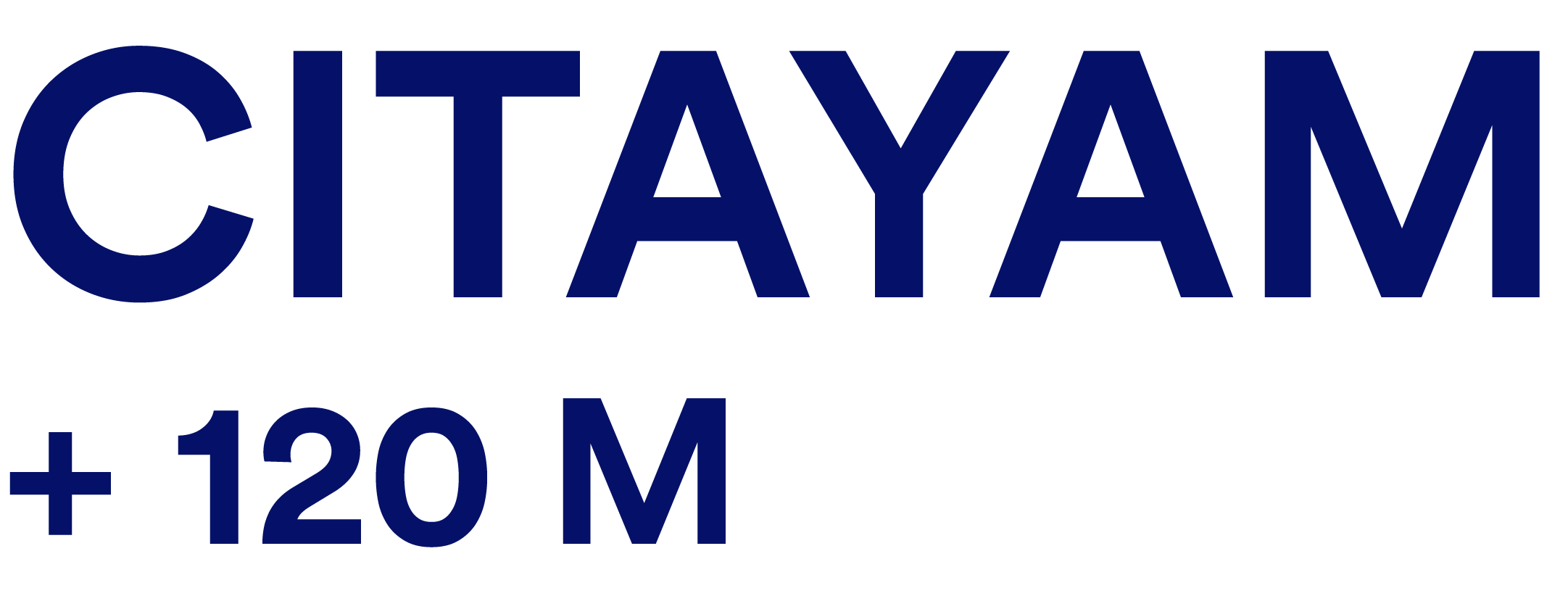
B22
G	Main building	
Platform floor	Side platform, the doors are opened on the right side	
Platform floor	Line 1	← (Depok) Bogor Line to Jakarta Kota
Platform floor	Line 2	Bogor Line to Bogor or Nambo (Bojong Gede/Pondok Rajeg) →
Platform floor	Side platform, the doors are opened on the right side	

== Services ==
The following is a list of train services at the Citayam Station

=== Passenger services ===
- KAI Commuter
  - Bogor Line, to Jakarta Kota and Bogor
  - Bogor Line (Nambo branch), to Jakarta Kota and Nambo

== Supporting transportation ==
Public transport type	Line	Destination
Angkot (Depok)	D05	Depok Bus Terminal–Bojong Gede Terminal
Angkot (Depok)	D26	Rangkapan Jaya-Citayam Station
Angkot (Bogor Regency)	111	Citayam Station-Pamager Sari

Preceding station	Kereta Api Indonesia	Following station
Depok towards Manggarai	Manggarai–Padalarang	Bojong Gede towards Padalarang
Terminus	Citayam–Nambo	Pondok Rajeg towards Nambo
