= Nambo railway station =

Railway station in Indonesia

b26 Nambo Station Stasiun Nambo
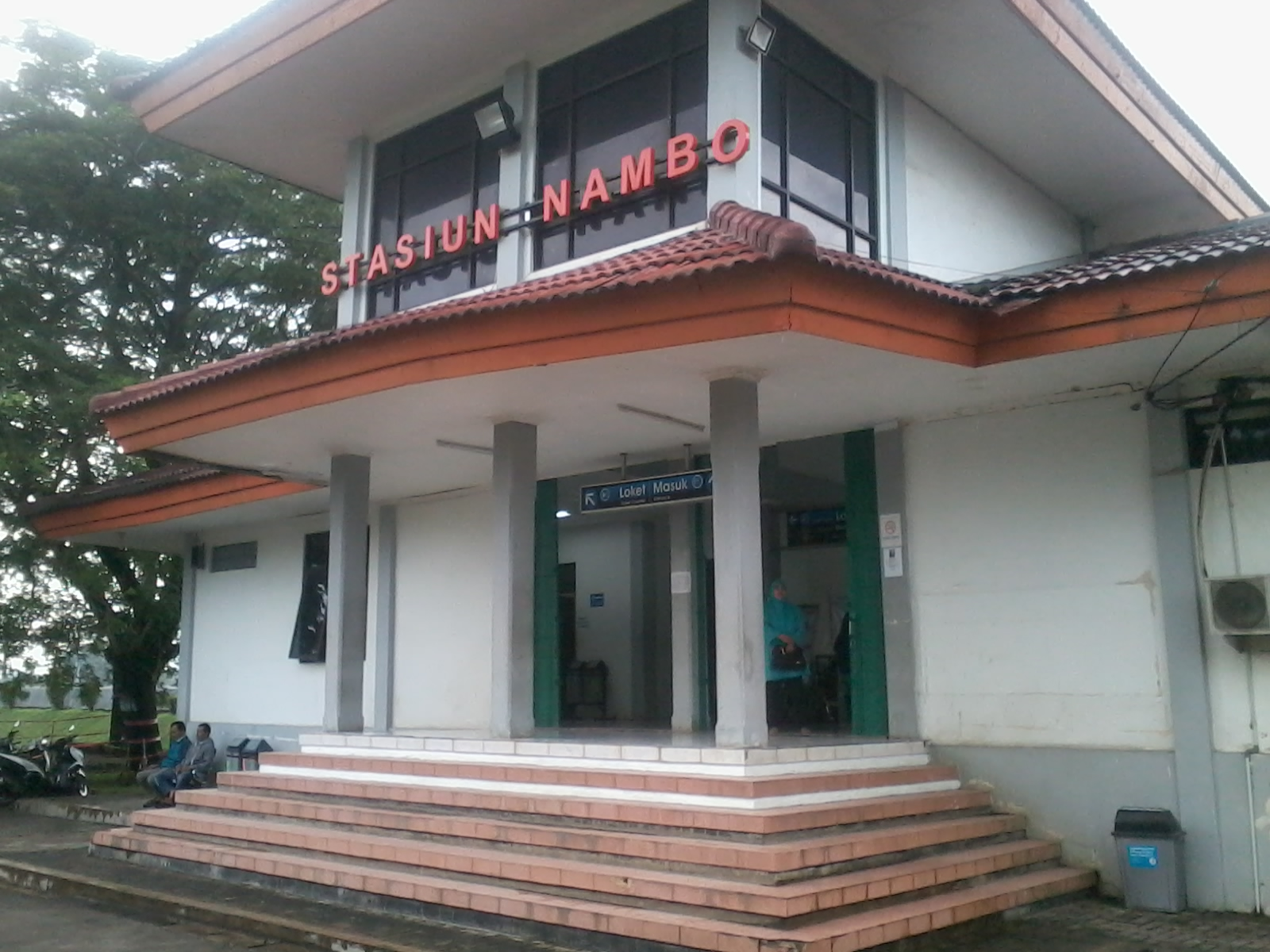
- Entrance of Nambo Station

General information
- Location: Jl. Raya Nambo Bantar Jati, Klapanunggal, Bogor Regency 16710; West Java; Indonesia
- Coordinates: 6.4662°S 106.9062°E
- Elevation: +220 m (720 ft)
- Owner: Kereta Api Indonesia
- Operator: KAI Commuter; KAI Logistik
- Lines: Citayam-Nambo railway; Bogor Line
- Platforms: single side platform
- Tracks: 8

Construction
- Structure type: Ground
- Parking: Available
- Accessible: Available

Other information
- Station code: NMO
- Classification: Class III

History
- Opened: 1997; 4 December 2013 (reopened–freight services 1 April 2015 (reopened–full services)
- Closed: 2006–2015
- Electrified: 2012

Services
Preceding station		Following station
Cibinong towards Jakarta Kota	Commuter Line Bogor Jakarta Kota–Nambo, vice versa.	Terminus
Location
- Location within Bogor Regency

Nambo Station (NMO) is a railway station located in Bantar Jati, Klapanunggal, Bogor Regency. Together with three other stations located on this line, it was only inaugurated in 1997, which makes it one of the newest station in the network. At the beginning, this line was planned to be incorporated into a larger circular line network, ranging from Cikarang, via Jonggol to Parung Panjang. This plan had to be postponed due to the 1997 economic crisis.

To fill the empty route, PT Kereta Api Indonesia (Indonesian Railway Company) operated DMU (KRD) Tanah Abang-Nambo line in 2002. This route only lasted until 2006 due to the very old rolling stock and large number of ticketless passengers that caused PT KAI's revenue leakage.

In 2012, PT KAI began to reactivate this railway line. This 12.6 km line was also electrified in order to let trains from Jakarta Commuter Line service run from Citayam branch.

Since 4 December 2013, PT KAI launched a freight train for cement transportation from Nambo to Kalimas Station in Surabaya, East Java. In its development, the train route was then extended to Ketapang. On 1 April 2015, this station began serving the KRL Commuterline for the Nambo-Depok/Angke route ten times a day. The station is now served by a branch service of Bogor Line that branches of Citayam since network's overhaul on 28 May 2022.

== Building and layout ==
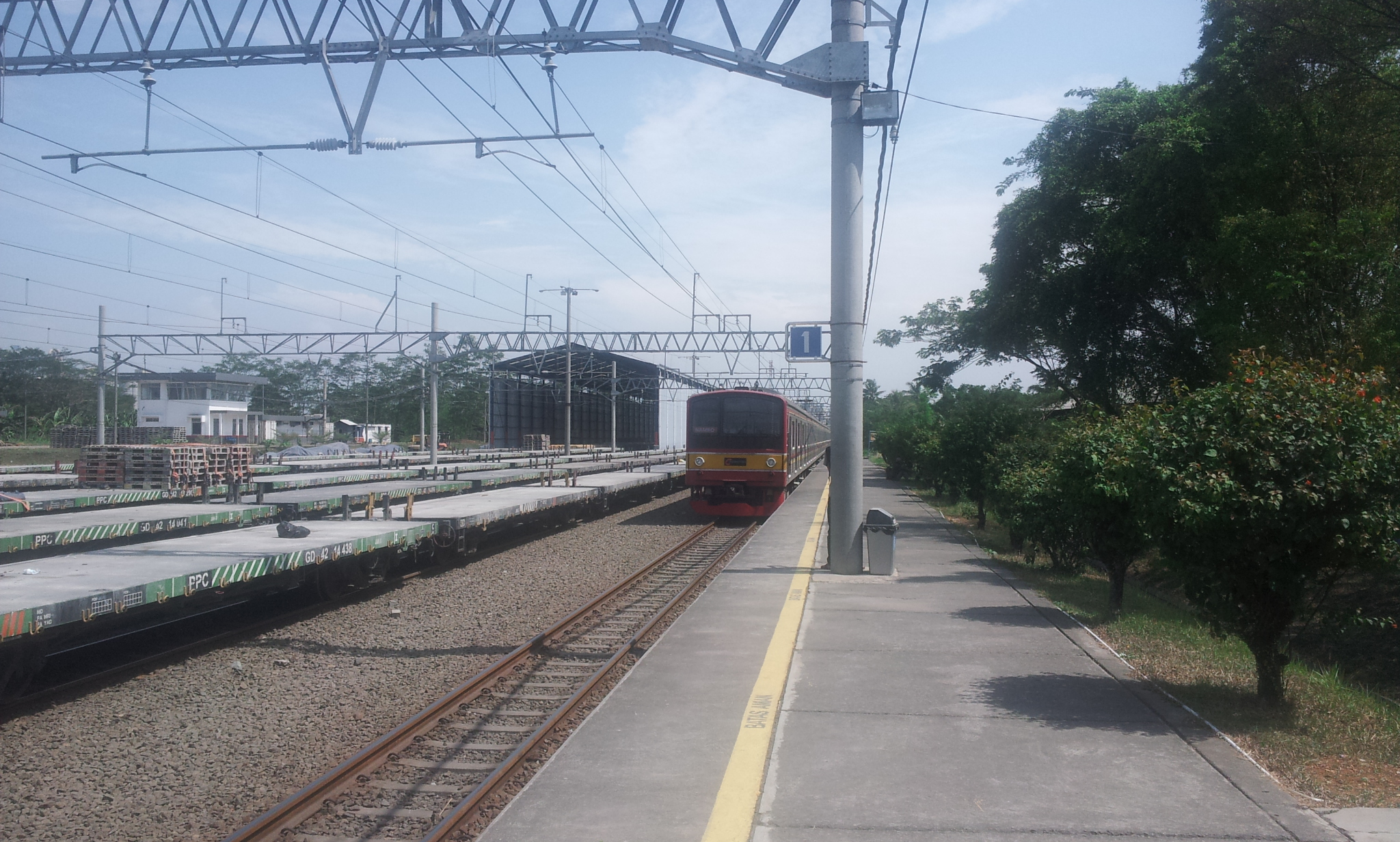
KRL Commuterline train arriving at Nambo Station

This station has eight train lines with line 1 being a straight line to the Gunung Putri Station, while to the east of line 2 is a buffer stop as the rail's end point. Line 1 is used for boarding and alighting KRL Commuterline passengers, while lines 2 to 8 are used for the storage of cement transport.

b26
G	Main building
Platform floor	Side platform, the doors are opened on the left side
Platform floor	Line 1	← (Cibinong) Bogor Line from and towards Jakarta Kota
Platform floor	Line 2	Tiga Roda Indocement train parking area
Platform floor	Line 3	Tiga Roda Indocement train parking area
Platform floor	Line 4	Tiga Roda Indocement train parking area
Platform floor	Line 5	Tiga Roda Indocement train unloading and loading area
Platform floor	Line 6	Tiga Roda Indocement train unloading and loading area
Platform floor	Line 7	Tiga Roda Indocement train unloading and loading area
Platform floor	Line 8	Tiga Roda Indocement train unloading and loading area

== Services ==
The following is a list of train services at the Nambo Station

=== Passenger services ===
- KAI Commuter
  - Bogor Line (Nambo branch), to Jakarta Kota

=== Freight ===
- KAI Logistik
  - Coal to Cigading
  - Indocement to Cisaat, Kalimas and Ketapang

== Supporting transportation ==
Type	Route	Destination
Angkot	F74	Citeureup–Nambo

== Gallery ==
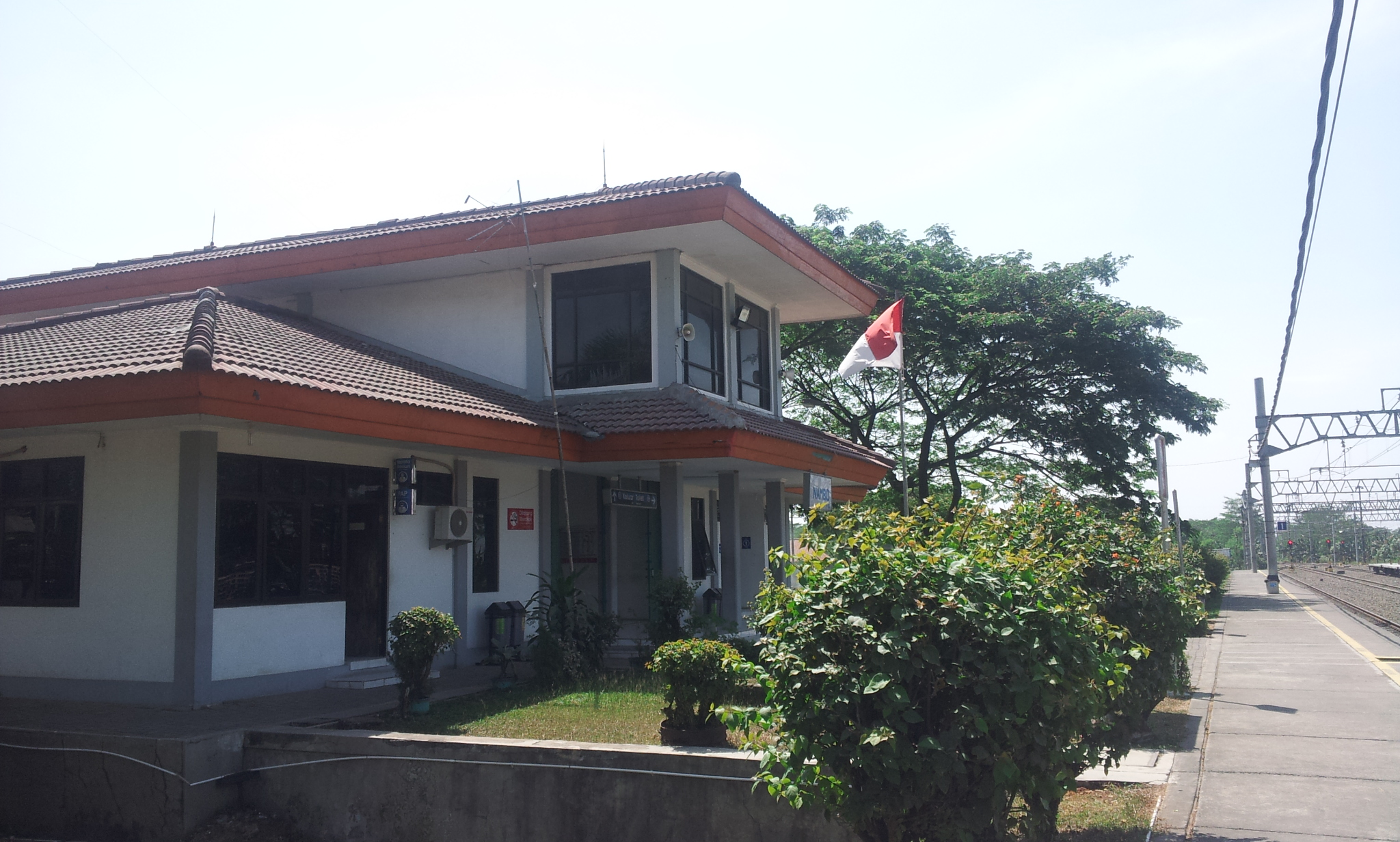
The main building of the station

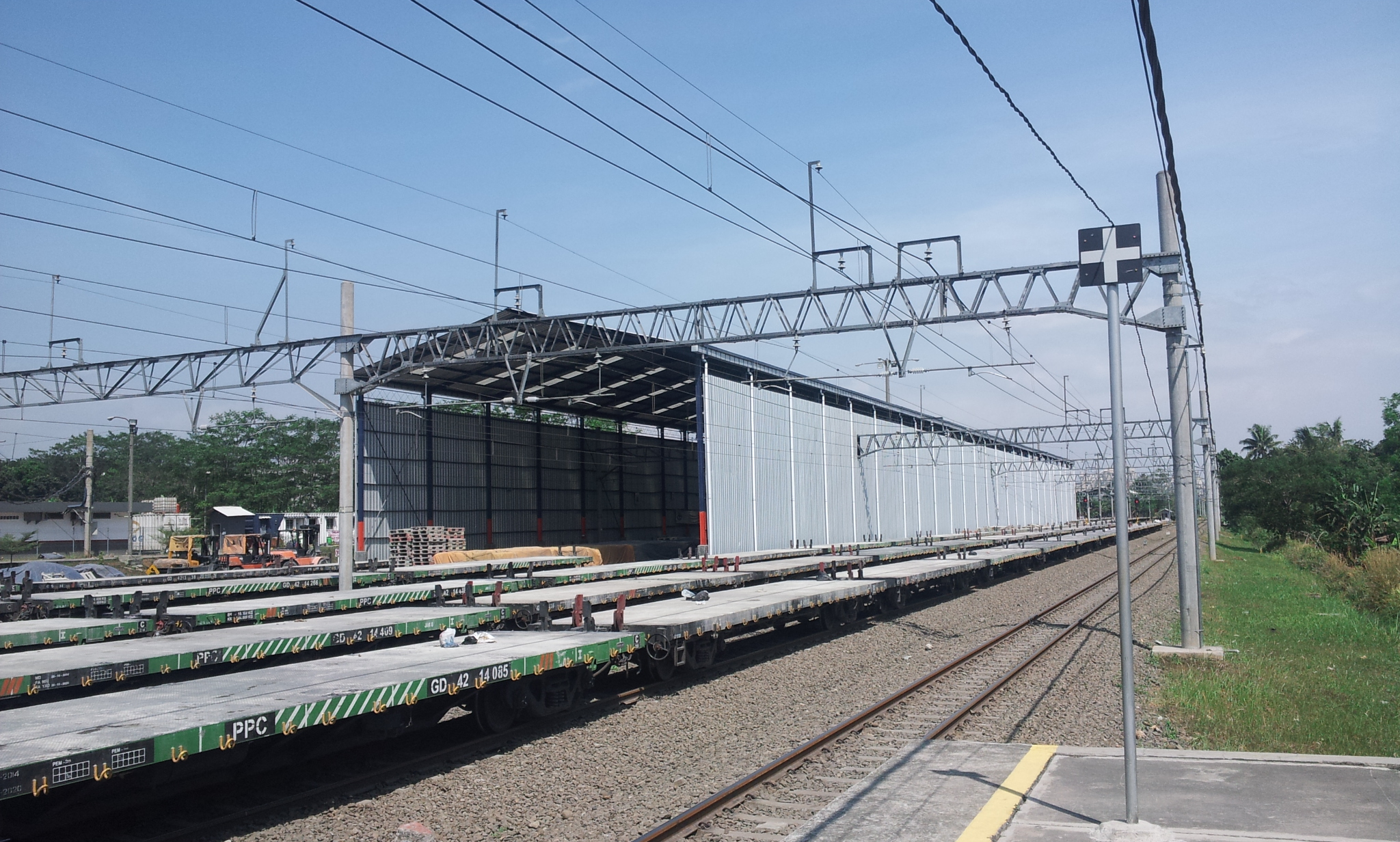
The cement warehouse

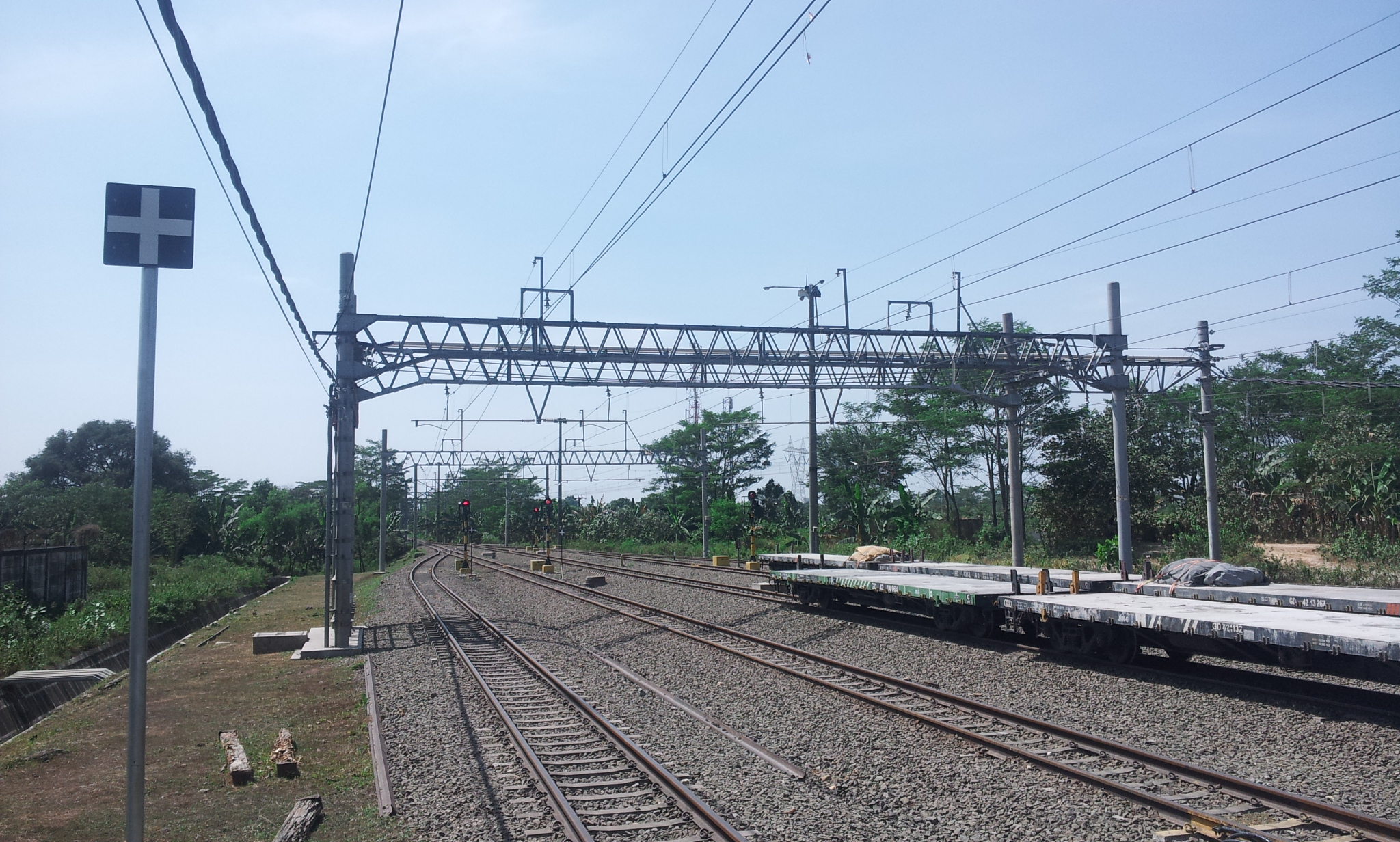
The platform of the station to the east

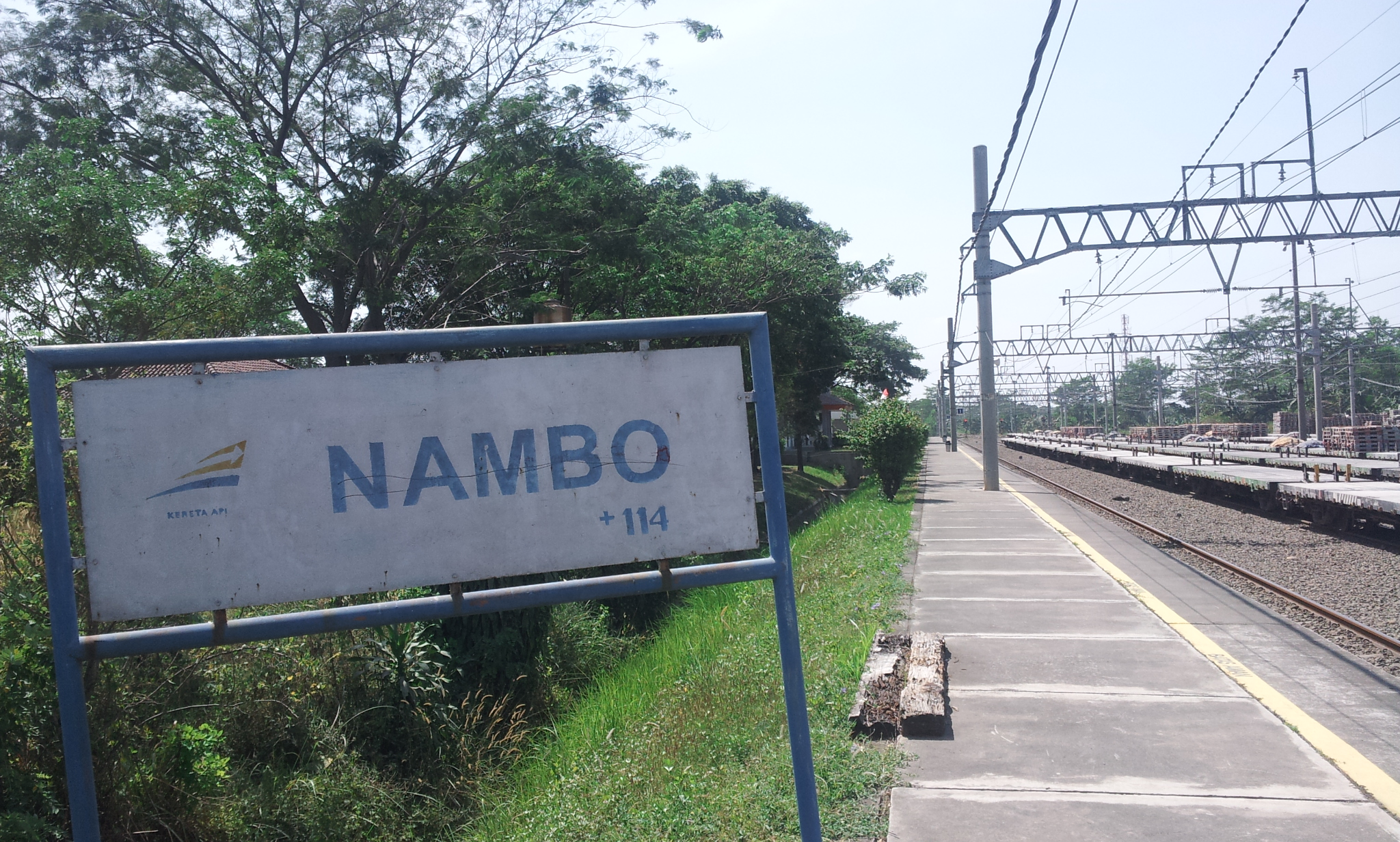
The signage of the station (July 2015)

Preceding station	Kereta Api Indonesia	Following station
~~Gunung Putri~~ towards Citayam	Citayam–Nambo	Terminus
