= Pancoran Mas =

- Town and District
- Location in the city of Depok, Java and Indonesia Pancoran Mas (Java) Pancoran Mas (Indonesia)
- Coordinates: 6°24′00″S 106°48′03″E
- Country: Indonesia
- Region: Java
- Province: West Java
- City: Depok

Area
  - Total: 18.05 km^{2} (6.97 sq mi)
- Elevation: 64 m (210 ft)

Population (mid 2023 estimate)
  - Total: 253,360
  - Density: 14,040/km^{2} (36,350/sq mi)
- Time zone: UTC+7 (IWST)
- Area code: (+62) 21
- Vehicle registration: B
- Villages: 6
- Website: pancoranmas.depok.go.id

Pancoran Mas is a town and an administrative district (kecamatan) within the city of Depok, in the province of West Java, Indonesia. It covers an area of 18.05 km^{2} and had a population of 210,514 at the 2010 Census and 245,000 at the 2020 Census; the latest official estimate (as at mid 2023) is 253,360.

== Communities ==
Pancoran Mas is sub-divided into six urban communities (kelurahan) listed below with their areas and their officially-estimated populations as at mid 2022, together with their postcodes.

Kode Wilayah	Name of kelurahan	Area in km^{2}	Population mid 2022 estimate	Post code
32.76.01.1006	Depok (town)	3.69	45,036	16431
32.76.01.1007	Depok Jaya	1.19	24,647	16432
32.76.01.1008	Pancoran Mas (town)	3.49	62,870	16436
32.76.01.1009	Mampang	2.18	26,919	16433
32.76.01.1010	Rangkapan Jaya Baru	3.80	38,409	16434
32.76.01.1011	Rangkapan Jaya	3.70	40,604	16435
32.76.01	Totals	18.05	238,485 ^{(a)}	

Notes: (a) comprising 119,521 males and 118,964 females.
