= Cornelis Chastelein =

- Born: August 10, 1657; Amsterdam, Netherlands
- Died: June 28, 1714 (aged 56); Batavia, Dutch East Indies

Cornelis Chastelein (Note: Also written Chasteleijn or Chastelijn) (10 August 1657 – 28 June 1714) was born of a notable merchant family. He was the youngest member of a family of eight children. His father, Anthony Chastelein, arrived to the Netherlands from France as a huguenot, and a member of the Dutch East India Company. His mother, Maria Cruydenier, was the daughter of the mayor of Dordrecht who served for the Dutch West India Company.

On 24 January 1675, 17-years-old Cornelis Chastelein boarded the Ship's ’t Huis te Cleeff and arrived at Batavia on 16 August 1675. In Batavia, Chastelein worked as an accountant in service of the company.

== Career ==
Cornelis Chastelein was successful in his career. In 1682 he was one a big shopkeeper (groot-winkelier) in the Grooten Winkel te Batavia. In 1691, he was of the wealthiest "Big Shopkeeper in the Big Store in Batavia", and in 1691 he was "Second Upperman of the Batavia Castle. In that same year, he was resolutely fired on request "with regard to his increasing weakness". It is not unlikely that the appointment of Joan van Hoorn as Director-General, by which he became Chastelein's chief, was the reason for this resignation request. It was known that Chastelein and van Hoorn doesn't go very well together.

From 1691 to 1704, Chastelein acquired various estates to the south of Batavia e.g. Siringsing (now Serengseng Sawah, South Jakarta) in 1695, at pole 17 (about 25 kilometres (16 miles) from Batavia), somewhere in the middle of the Batavia-Buitenzorg route. On 18 May 1696, he bought a plot of land with an area of 12.44 square kilometres, at pole 21 (about 32 kilometres (20 miles) from Batavia), between Ciliwung and Pesanggrahan river. There he established the first of its kind in Java, a Protestant congregation consisting of native Indonesians which was named De Eerste Protestante Organisatie van Christenen (DEPOC).

== Weltevreden ==
In 1704, Chastelein bought another land which later he named Weltevreden. In this new estate he established the first experimental coffee plantation in the Indies, as well as the first Indies zoo. In the estate of Depok he created a pepper plantation. It can not be a coincidence that Chastelein had let this family work in Depok, slave families like Laurens and Loen from Ambon. During the period he wrote a dissertation in which he established an ethical manifestation against the Dutch East India Company's merchant politics, especially toward Governor General Willem van Outhoorn, who was in favor of aggressive trade policy.

Cornelis Chastelein was against slavery and he would give slaves in the colonial land their freedom. The church council of Batavia had ruled that slavery is contrary to the Bible, but this provision was valid only for Christians. Because of this, Chastelein converted his slaves to Christianity and made them free people. Their number in the year 1714 – the year that Chastelein died – was estimated about 200.

== Slave families ==
For his estate Depok, Chastelein bought twelve slave families from various parts of the archipelago: Balinese, Ambonese, Buginese and Sundanese. It is suspected that there were also the descendants of the Mardijkers, a group of Portuguese-creole, among his slaves.

Of the twelve original slave families, at least five families decided to receive a new Christian name from Chastelein. There were also Roman Catholic families which were converted to (Protestant) Christianity by Chastelein. Isakh, Jacob, Jonathan, Joseph and Samuel are the Biblical names given to Chastelein to the converted slave families. The remaining seven families retained their original names: Bacas, Laurens, Leander, Loen, Sadokh, Soedira and Tholense. After the Second World War, the name Sadokh went extinct.

In 1704, Chastelein worked for the company once more as 'Extraordinary Council'. After his first meeting in the Council of the Indies in 1705, he was appointed as Ordinary Member of the Council of Dutch India in November 1708, receiving a monthly allowance of 350 guilders per month. He remained in this position to his death.

== Marriage ==
Cornelis Chastelein was married to Catharina of Quaelborg. She was probably his niece, since her father, Council of India, was married to one Henriëtte Chastelein.

They had one son Anthony, while Chastelein's will shows that they have also adopted a mixed blood girl as daughter: Maria Chastelein mixtures (5 June 1693). Cornelis Chastelein died at the age of 56, on 28 June 1714 at 4 o'clock in the afternoon and 28 June is still the official day of Chastelein being commemorated.

In addition to his great ability as a businessman, Chastelein was a socially moved man who had his time far ahead. His greatest merit, however, was his legacy to his body-owners. In his will, he had found that the twelve original families had the estate Depok, 1240 ha. great, if he would inherit a communal property and thereby obtain their freedom. And thus it was determined that "released bodies and their descendants would have landed forever and used".

== Trivia ==
The name Chastelein does not exist anymore. The people are now called Castelein or Casteleijn.

== Cited works ==
- Kwisthout, Jan-Karel (2007). Sporen uit het verleden van Depok: een nalatenschap van Cornelis Chastelein (1657–1714) aan zijn vrijgemaakte christenslaven. ISBN 9789085398165.
