= Gunung Putri =

- Town and District
- Location in Bogor Regency, Java and Indonesia Gunung Putri (Java) Gunung Putri (Indonesia)
- Coordinates: 6.428878°S 106.924119°E
- Country: Indonesia
- Province: West Java
- Regency: Bogor Regency

Government
  - Camat: Aris Pudjo Widyo Susanto

Area
  - Total: 58.18 km^{2} (22.46 sq mi)
- Elevation: 115 m (377 ft)
- Highest elevation: 166 m (545 ft)
- Lowest elevation: 35 m (115 ft)

Population (mid 2025 estimate)
  - Total: 311,380
  - Density: 5,352/km^{2} (13,860/sq mi)
- Time zone: UTC+7 (IWST)
- Area code: (+62) 251
- Vehicle registration: F
- Villages: 10
- Website: kecamatangunungputri.bogorkab.go.id

Gunung Putri is a town and an administrative district (Indonesian: Kecamatan) in the Bogor Regency, West Java, Indonesia, and is also part of the Jabodetabek metropolitan area (also known as Greater Jakarta). The district covers an area of 58.18 km^{2}, and had a population of 329,918 at the 2010 Census and 297,724 at the 2020 Census; the official estimate as at mid 2025 was 311,380 (comprising 154,403 males and 151,710 females). The administrative centre is located at Wanaherang, and the district is sub-divided into ten villages (desa), as listed below from south to north, with their areas and their populations as at mid 2025, together with their postcodes.

Kode Wilayah	Name of Desa	Area in km^{2}	Population mid 2025 estimate	Post code
32.01.02.2010	Karanggan	3.07	24,900	16960
32.01.02.2004	Gunung Putri (town)	3.09	20,238	16961
32.01.02.2006	Tlajung Udik	4.40	45,397	16962
32.01.02.2005	Bojong Nangka	6.73	26,954	16963
32.01.02.2007	Cicadas	6.56	42,504	16964
32.01.02.2001	Wanaherang	6.70	33,068	16965
32.01.02.2008	Cikeas Udik	6.52	26,178	16966
32.01.02.2009	Nagrak	5.84	18,700	16967
32.01.02.2003	Ciangsana	8.62	35,121	16968
32.01.02.2002	Bojong Kulur	4.77	38,320	16969
32.01.02	Totals	58.18	311,380	

Because of its location, the district has earned itself a large population of commuters, and a high density of population, compared to the other districts in the regency, with the district's northern part including a "planned community" called Cibubur, complete with house complexes, parks, schools, and other facilities, all being designed and built by real estates. The most northerly district (Bojong Kulur) projects deep into Bekasi city, which surrounds it on three sides. Apart from that, the central and southern portions of the district are also packed with houses, although the southern part centres more on being an industrial area.

== Gallery ==
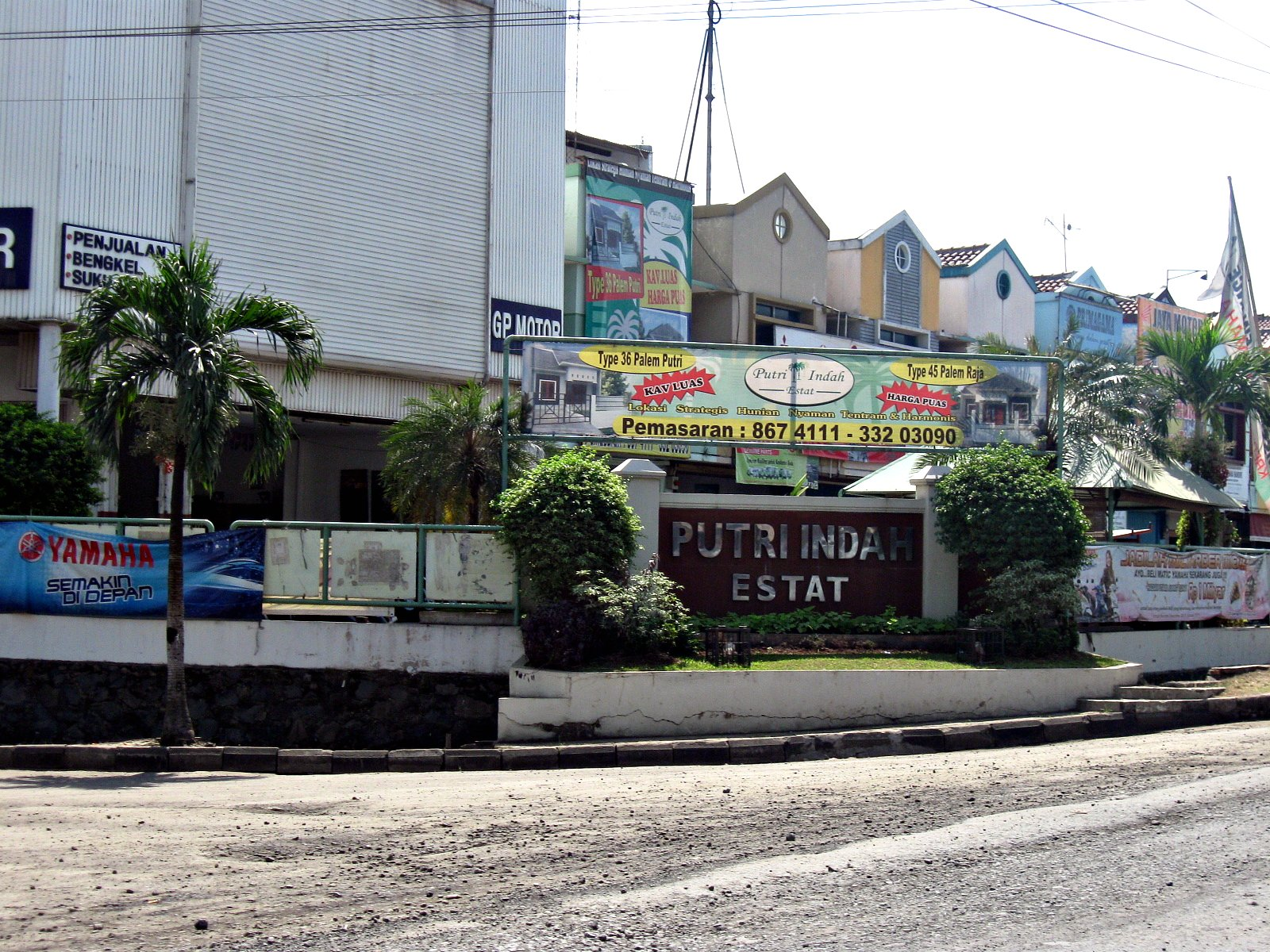
Entrance to one of the housing complexes

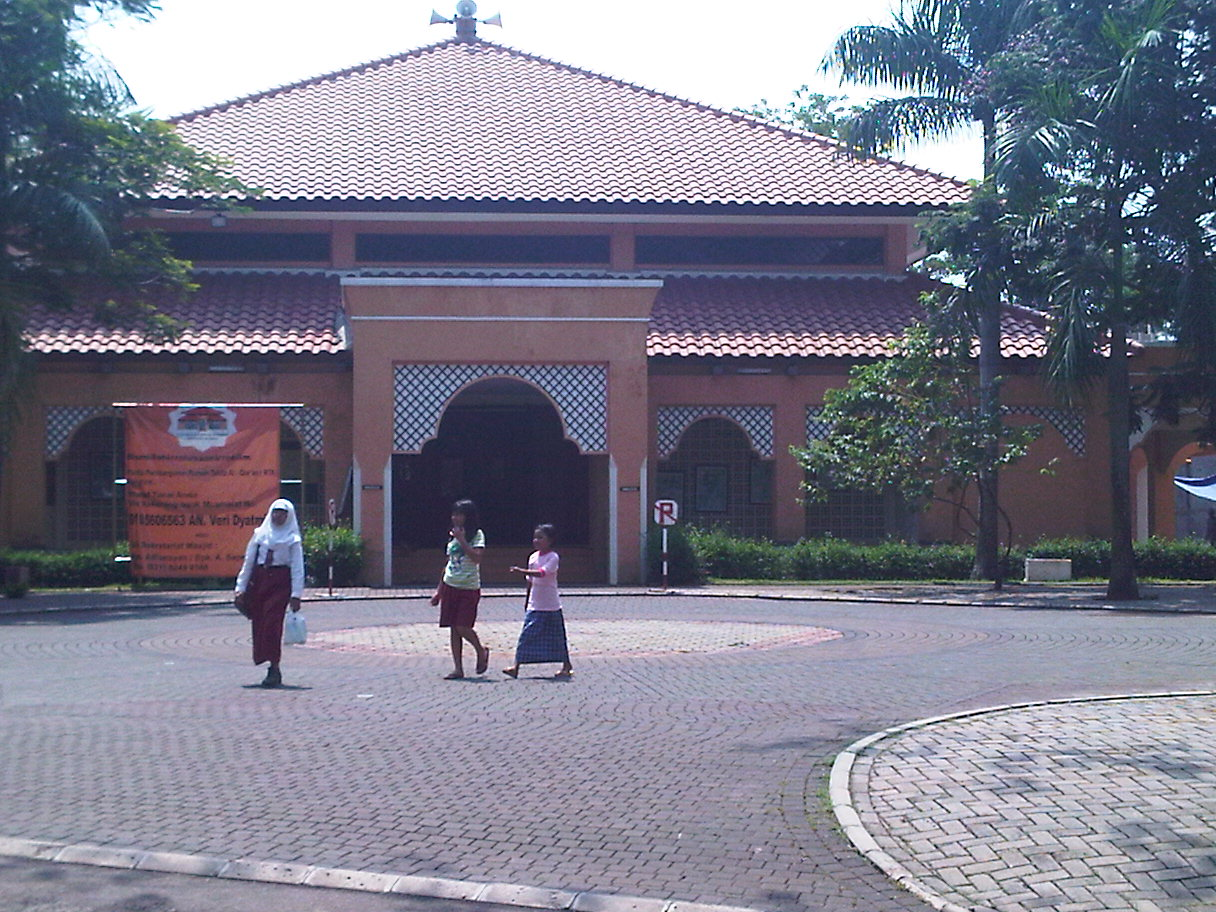
A mosque in Gunung Putri
