= Bojong Gede railway station =

Railway station in Indonesia

B23 Bojong Gede Station Stasiun Bojong Gede
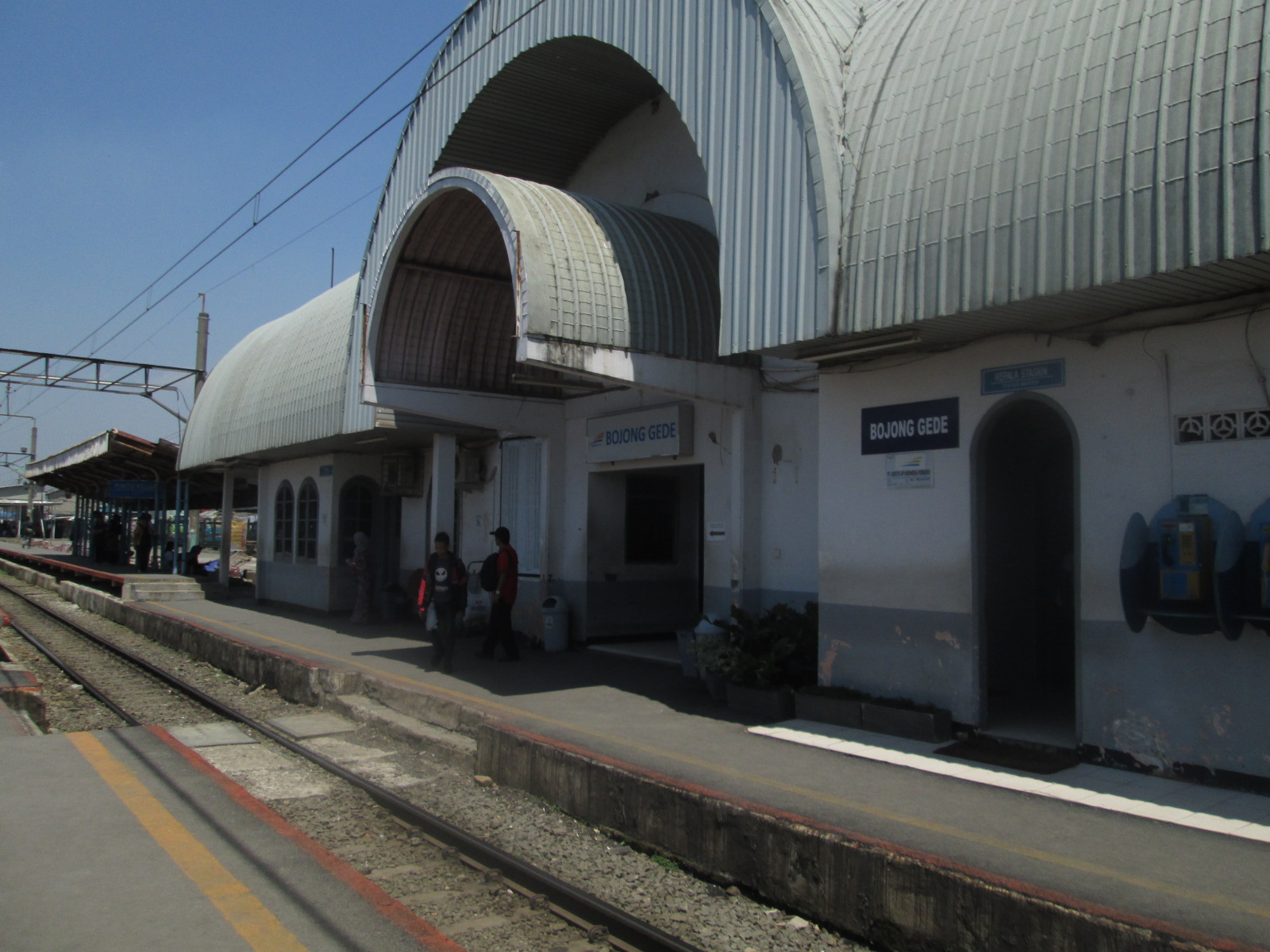
- Bojong Gede Station building from platform level.

General information
- Location: Jl. Raya Bojong Gede, Bojong Gede, Bojong Gede, Bogor Regency; West Java; Indonesia
- Coordinates: 6°29′36″S 106°47′42″E
- Elevation: +140 m (460 ft)
- Owner: Kereta Api Indonesia
- Operator: KAI Commuter
- Lines: Manggarai–Padalarang railway; Bogor Line
- Platforms: 2 side platforms
- Tracks: 2

Construction
- Structure type: Ground
- Parking: Available
- Accessible: Available

Other information
- Station code: BJD • 0708
- Classification: Class I

History
- Opened: 1873
- Electrified: 6 April 1925

Services
Preceding station		Following station
Citayam towards Jakarta Kota	Bogor Commuter Line Jakarta Kota–Bogor, vice versa.	Cilebut towards Bogor
Location
- Location within Bogor Regency

Bojong Gede Station (BJD) is a railway station located in Bojong Gede, Bojong Gede, Bogor Regency, West Java that was opened in 1873. The station is located at an altitude of +140 meters above sea level. This station serves as a KRL Commuterline train stop serving the Jabodetabek area.

On 19 April 2022, the Ministry of Transportation carry out the physical work of the skybridge construction project after signing the work contract for the construction of the overpass that connects this station with the Bojong Gede type C bus terminal which is located 400 meters northwest of this station.

== Station layout ==
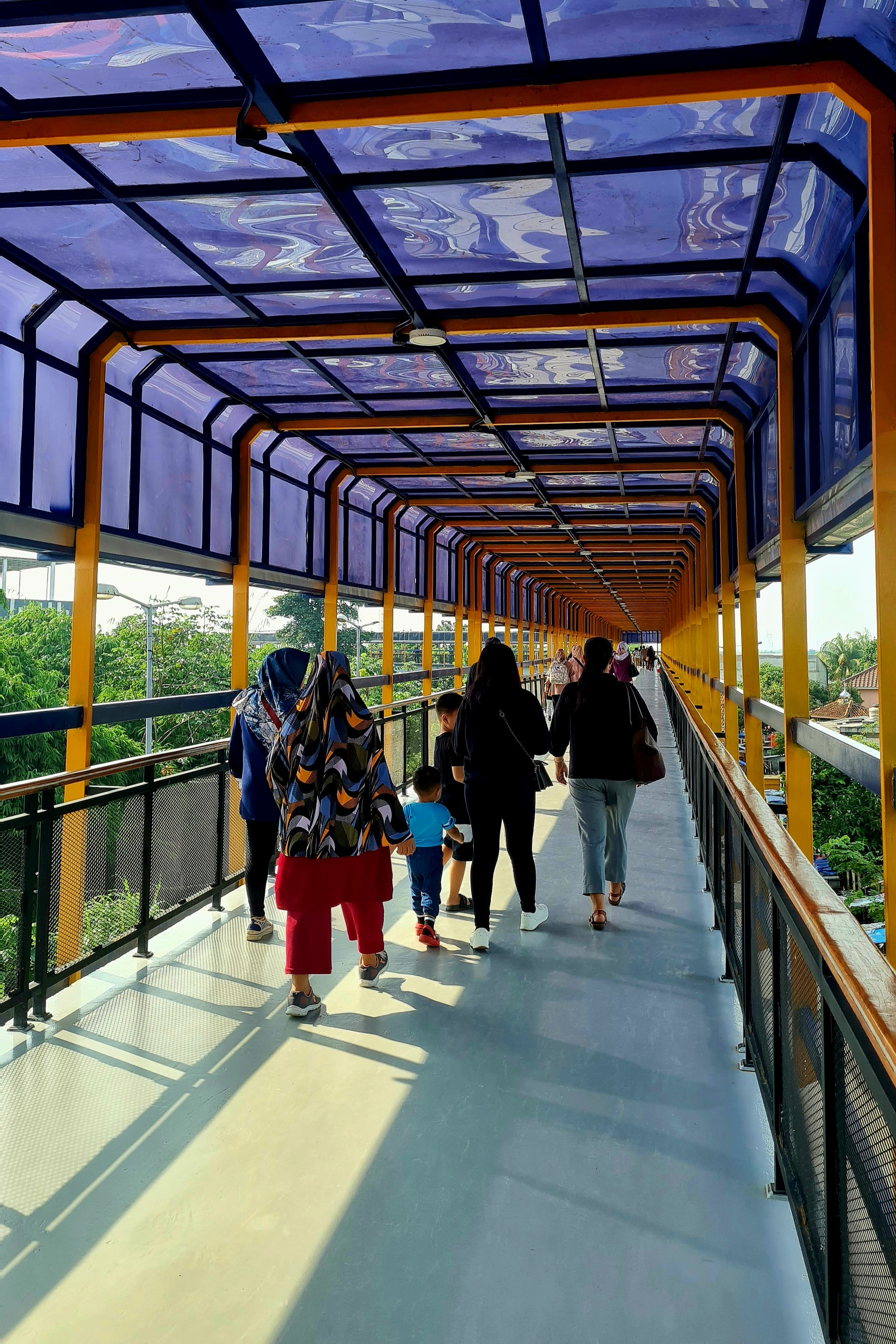
Bojong Gede Skybridge, station access from local public transport terminal

This station has two railway tracks. In 2015, the station platform was extended to accommodate 12 carriages of a single KRL train series.

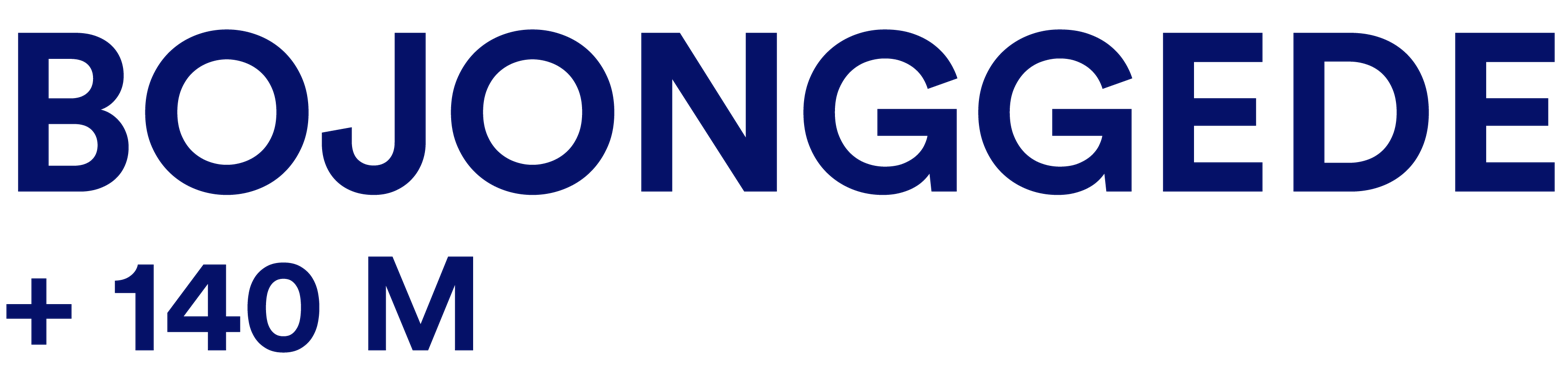
B23
G	Main building	
Platform floor	Side platform, the doors are opened on the right side	
Platform floor	Line 2	← (Citayam) Bogor Line to Jakarta Kota
Platform floor	Island platform	
Platform floor	Line 1	Bogor Line to Bogor (Cilebut) →
Platform floor	Side platform, the doors are opened on the right side	
G	Main building	

== Services ==
The following is a list of train services at the Bojong Gede Station

=== Passenger services ===
- KAI Commuter
  - Bogor Line, to Jakarta Kota and Bogor

== Intermodal support ==
Public transport type	Line	Destination
Angkot	07	Pasar Anyar–Bojong Gede Station
Angkot	31	Bojong Gede Station-Cimandala
Angkot	117	Bojong Gede Terminal-Kalisuren

== Incidents ==
- On 21 November 2012, landslides caused the railway line to be cut between Bojong Gede Station and Cilebut Station. Bojong Gede Station automatically becomes the last station for KRL trips to Bogor. The rail track that was hit by the landslide was successfully repaired within 8 days.

Preceding station	Kereta Api Indonesia	Following station
Citayam towards Manggarai	Manggarai–Padalarang	Cilebut towards Padalarang
