= 2023 Indonesian used train import controversy =

2023 train controversy

In 2023, a controversy arose in Indonesia over the import of used Japanese electric multiple units for use in the Commuterline network.

KAI Commuter, intending to import additional used Japanese trains to replace old rolling stock and expand the capacity of the network, failed to secure approval from a number of government bodies such as the Ministry of Industry and the Coordinating Ministry for Maritime and Investments Affairs. The ministries gave preference to domestically produced, albeit costlier, units by Industri Kereta Api. The importation of used rolling stock were eventually shot down, and KAI instead agreed to import new trainsets while refurbishing old ones.

== Background ==
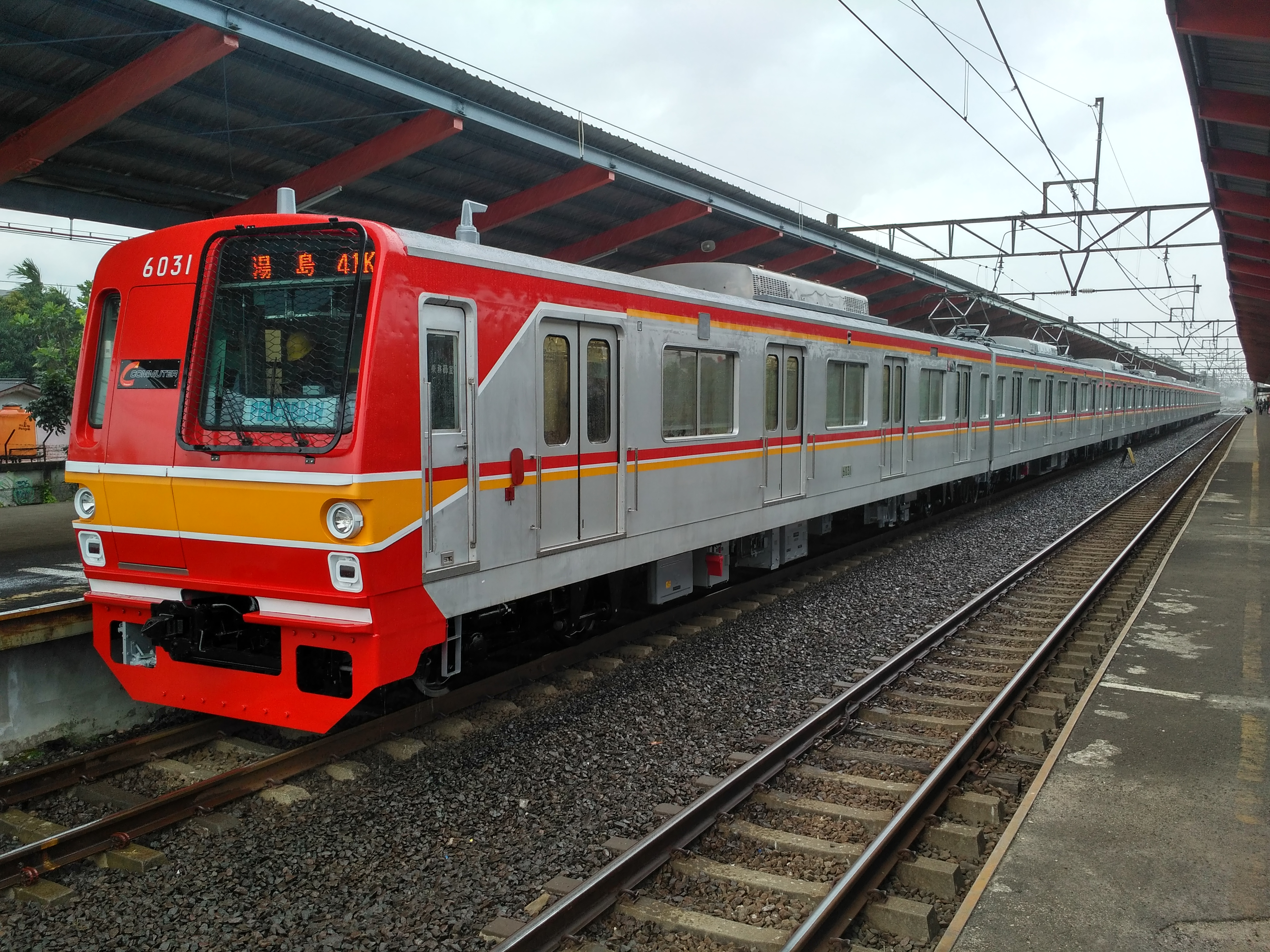
A used Tokyo Metro 6000 series car as part of Commuterline.

Since 2000, the Indonesian state-owned railway operator Kereta Api Indonesia (KAI) have received or imported secondhand rolling stock from Japan for use in the Greater Jakarta commuter railway network. Starting around 2010, this accelerated and by 2018 KAI (or its subsidiary, KAI Commuter) was operating over 900 used Japanese train cars. For Japanese railway companies, it was often considered more cost-effective to transfer the used train cars than to scrap them locally due to environmental regulations. Additionally, Japan and Indonesia share the 1,067 mm gauge, which made Japanese trains immediately usable in Indonesia.

These cars were transferred at a relatively low price – according to trade statistics, over a thousand Japanese train cars were sold to Indonesia with a price below ¥10 million (~USD 100,000 each) between 1999 and 2017, while KAI stated in 2023 that it would cost the company Rp 150 billion (~USD 10 million) to import ten used train car sets (100 cars) from Japan. In comparison, KAI stated that locally manufactured trains by Industri Kereta Api (INKA) would cost Rp 4 trillion (US$270 million) for the purchase of 160 cars. Both KAI and its passengers generally welcomed the Japanese cars such as the Tokyo Metro 6000 series, which arrived in typically good condition and featured air conditioning. Furthermore, as INKA lacked the production capacity to rapidly expand commuter services, KAI under then-CEO Ignasius Jonan opted to import more cars throughout the 2010s.

== 2023 import ==
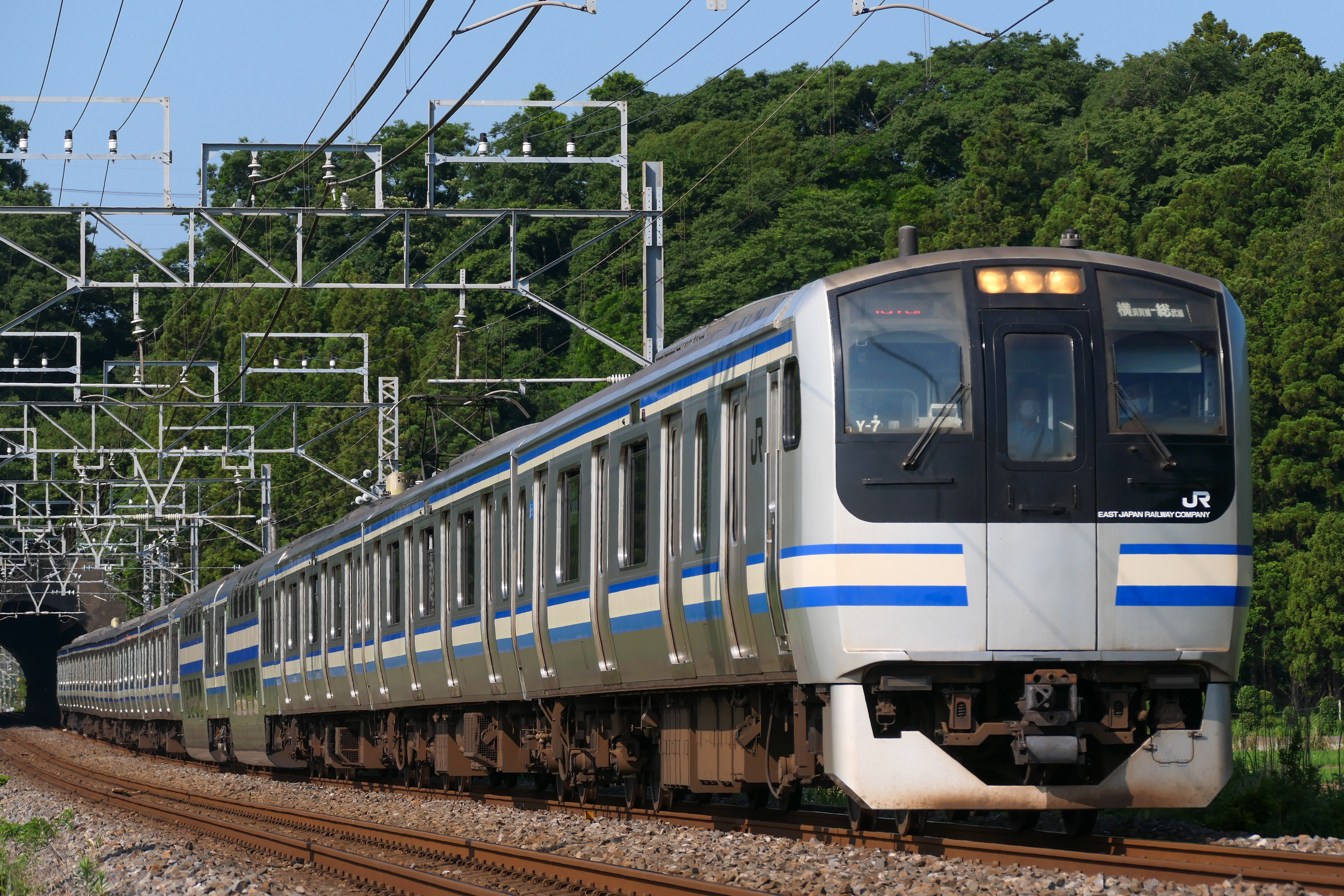
An E217 series trainset, the model type KAI sought to import

In September 2022, KAI filed for permission to import 348 used Japanese E217 series cars, as it planned to retire a number of older trainsets and expand its capacity in 2023. However, in January 2023, the Ministry of Industry rejected the filing, claiming that INKA was capable of manufacturing the needed train cars. INKA, however, stated that it would only be able to fulfill the production needed by 2025, as it already had production backlogs for the Jabodebek LRT and the Trans-Sulawesi Railway.

Following the industrial ministry's rejection, a review by the Finance and Development Supervisory Agency (BPKP) further recommended that KAI not import the trains, and proposed that KAI should instead retrofit the 29 trainsets previously intended to be retired. The BPKP's review also considered the present Commuterline capacity to be sufficient, citing overall occupancy while acknowledging overload during peak hours. It further noted that the expected passenger loads in 2023 were lower than the actual passenger numbers recorded in 2019, despite the number of train carriages being slightly higher. The Coordinating Ministry for Maritime and Investments Affairs also opposed the import, citing the BPKP recommendation.

On 22 June 2023, the Coordinating Minister for Maritime and Investment Affairs Luhut Binsar Pandjaitan announced that the import of the used train cars will be cancelled, but instead the government will import three newly manufactured trainsets from Japan. The trainsets are expected to arrive in Indonesia by 2024. KAI set aside Rp 676.8 billion (US$42 million) to purchase the trainsets. However, this was later changed when KAI Commuter opted to import new trains from China's CRRC Qingdao Sifang instead. Pandjaitan added that this was to avoid violating a number of ministerial regulations, including one from the Ministry of Trade which banned the importation of capital goods exceeding 20 years of age. Minister of State-Owned Enterprises Erick Thohir noted that the import would be done to cover short-term needs, as the recovery in passenger numbers exceeded KAI's projections. KAI also signed a contract with PT INKA for 16 new trainsets, to be delivered gradually between 2025 and 2026.

== Reactions ==
One member of the People's Representative Council, Andre Rosiade from the Gerindra Party, initially voiced his opposition to the import, but switched his stance after riding a train during rush hour due to public demand. Another legislator, Evita Nursanty of PDI-P, also opposed the bill and questioned the urgency of the import.
