= KRL Commuterline =

Commuter rail system in Greater Jakarta, Indonesia

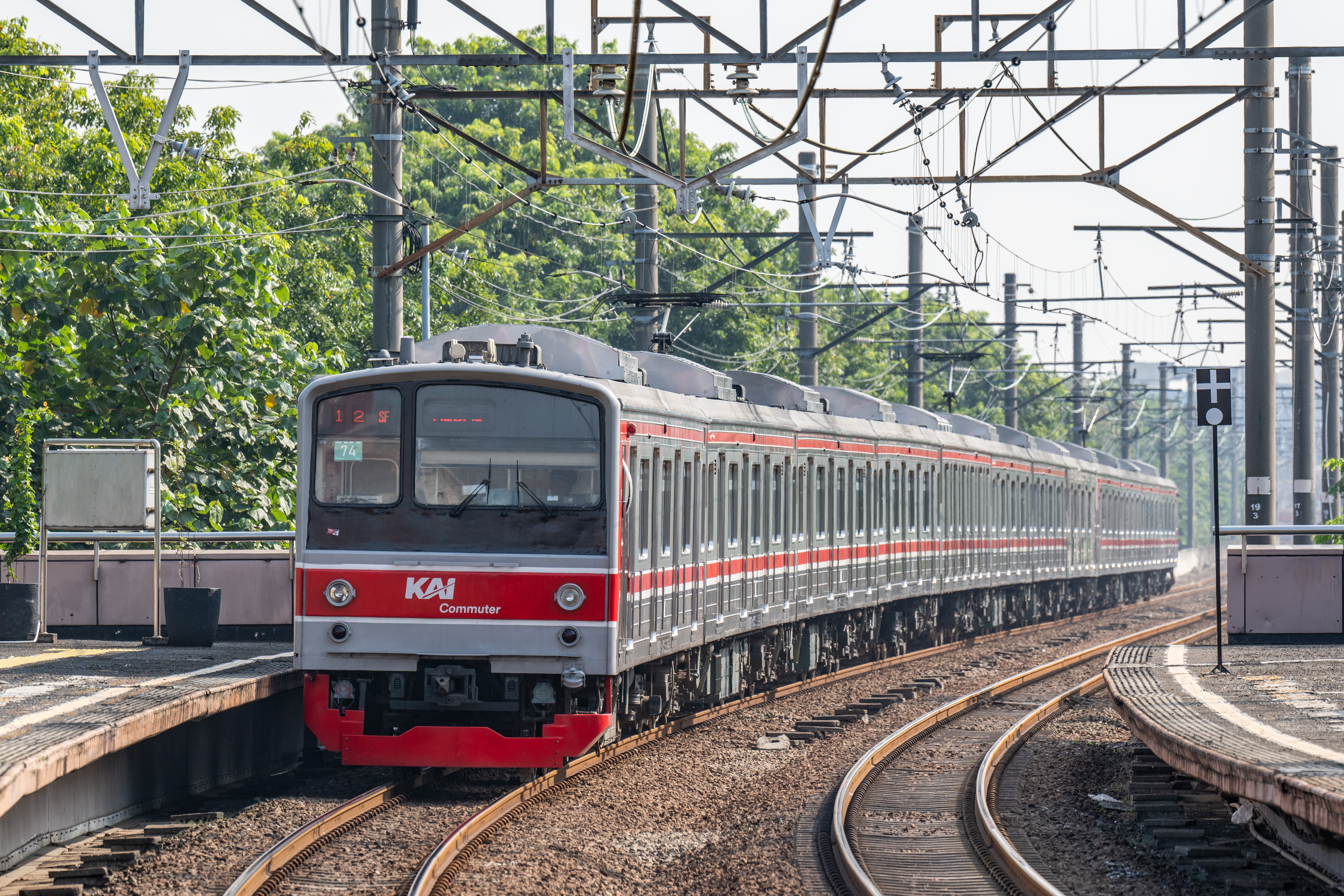
- 205 series EMU entering Gondangdia Station

Overview
- Native name: Kereta Rel Listrik (KRL) Commuter Line/Jabodetabek
- Owner: Kereta Api Indonesia
- Area served: Greater Jakarta
- Locale: Jakarta, Indonesia
- Transit type: Commuter rail
- Number of lines: 5
- Number of stations: 82 (operational); 4 (under construction)
- Daily ridership: 1,671,031 (daily highest); 1,030,610 (weekday); 1,003,383 (2026 average); 736,203 (weekend)
- Annual ridership: 349,311,251 (2025)
- Headquarters: Juanda Station 2nd floor, Sawah Besar, Jakarta, Indonesia
- Website: kci.id

Operation
- Began operation: 6 April 1925 – 1945 (Tandjoengpriok–Meester Cornelis line); 1945 (under the present-day Kereta Api Indonesia); 15 September 2008; 18 years ago (under the present-day KAI Commuter)
- Operator: KAI Commuter
- Number of vehicles: see below
- Train length: 8, 10 or 12 cars per trainset
- Headway: 3 minute(s)– 1hour (Some routes)

Technical
- System length: 332.2 km (206.4 mi) (operational); 166.8 km (103.6 mi) (planned); 499 km (310 mi) (total)
- Track gauge: 1,067 mm (3 ft 6 in) Cape gauge
- Electrification: 1,500 V DC overhead catenary
- Top speed: 95 km/h (59 mph)
System map
At present map of KRL Commuterline

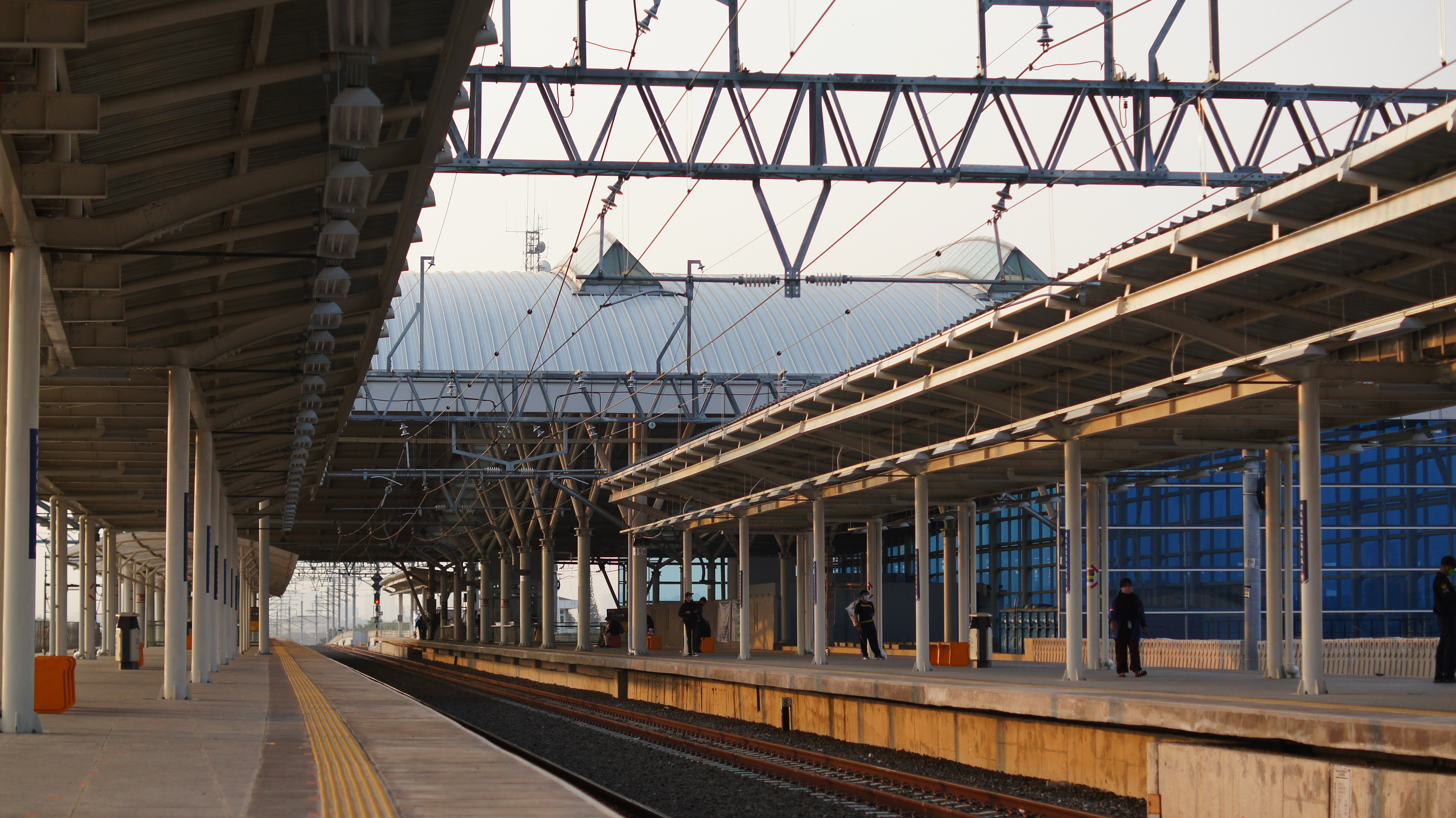
Manggarai Station Platform

KRL Commuterline, commonly known as Greater Jakarta Commuter rail, Jakarta Commuter rail, and KRL Commuter Line Jabodetabek is a commuter rail system for Greater Jakarta in Indonesia. It was previously known as KRL Jabodetabek. It is operated by KAI Commuter (KAIC), a subsidiary of the Indonesian national railway company PT Kereta Api Indonesia (KAI). The rail system uses rolling stock of rapid transit standard and operates high frequency services with minimum headway. In 2026, the average number of Commuterline users per day reached 1.1 million. During June-July 2025, this figure surged to 1.3 million per day.

"KRL" itself stands for "Kereta Rel Listrik" (literally "electric rail train" or "electric railcar"), a term for an electric multiple unit train.

== History ==
=== Colonial era ===
In 1917, a plan to introduce electric railways in what was then Batavia known as Jakarta was made by Dutch colonial railway company Staatsspoorwegen. A railway between Tanjung Priok to Meester Cornelis (Jatinegara) was the first line to be electrified, becoming the first narrow gauge electric railway service in Southeast Asia. The electric rail construction began in 1923 and completed on 24 December 1924, powered by 1500 V DC overhead wires. The line was opened on 6 April 1925—in time for the SS 50th anniversary—with 3000-series electric locomotives from SLM–BBC (Swiss Locomotive and Machine Works – Brown Boveri & Cie), 3100-series electric locomotives from AEG Germany, 3200-series electric locomotives from Werkspoor Netherlands and passenger coaches, as well as 30 ESS 100/200/400 EMU passenger motor and trailer cars forming electric multiple unit rakes, all manufactured for the railway by Westinghouse and General Electric.

The electrification project continued and on 1 May 1927, all the rail lines that surround Batavia had been fully electrified. Batavia Zuid station (now Jakarta Kota) was temporarily closed in 1926 and was reopened on 8 October 1929 to accommodate the new electric motive power that by then had become an envy of the region, which by then had been dominated by steam. The last part of the electrification project, Batavia Zuid – Buitenzorg (Bogor), was completed in 1930. After independence in 1945, in periods before and after a brief return to Dutch government control for the network and also a 4-year Japanese operation of the railways during the Second World War, the Jakarta electric railway fell under the supervision of the new Indonesian government thru DKARI (Djawatan Kereta Api Repoeblik Indonesia, Indonesian Railways Service, former name of the present KAI), with Indonesian personnel controlling its assets. The city's growth postwar led to the network becoming the nation's true first commuter rail service, combined with steam and later on diesel powered commuter trains serving the capital and its suburbs.

=== Decline and revival ===
Transportation in Jakarta was at its lowest point during the 1960s. Tramways in Jakarta were closed in 1960 and railway traffic on Manggarai – Jakarta Kota was restricted in November 1966. In 1965, a portion of railway line between Gondangdia and Sawah Besar was stripped from electrification, with remaining services on the portion now powered by steam and diesel trains. It was reported that then-President Sukarno wanted to get rid of anything that would block the view of Monas and Merdeka Square, then still under construction. After Sukarno's fall, the electrification was later reconstructed and was formally reopened in 1970 sans the EMUs, two converted into diesel railbuses, the rest into locomotive hauled trains for the steam and diesel traction of the capital commuter runs, as well as the remaining electric locomotives from the 1920s.

On 16 May 1972, The National Railway Corporation of Indonesia (Perusahaan Negara Kereta Api/PNKA, successor of DKA), as part of the festivities for the 47th anniversary of the electric railways, finally ordered 10 new sets of electric multiple units from Japan, leading to the revival of the electric train services within Greater Jakarta. The new trains, built by Nippon Sharyo, arrived in 1976 - as a belated gift for the Golden Jubilee of the commuter train services the previous year, 1975 - and replaced the old locomotives and locomotive-hauled coaches on the then electric lines, driven by the then ongoing rehabilitation efforts on the rest of the network and funding that precipated another round of expansion into the suburbs of the capital. These EMU sets consisted of four cars each, with capacity of 134 passengers per car. Those new trains (commonly known as EMU Rheostatik) will continue serving the passengers in Jakarta for the next 37 years. PNKA continued importing trains from Japan, South Korea, Belgium and Netherlands until the late 1990s, while it also accepted Indonesian builds by local manufacturer Industri Kereta Api beginning 1987. By the 1990s, Greater Jakarta commuter rail used a mixture of EMUs and DMUs, with lines waiting for electrification used Japan-made DMUs (class MCW 302) or diesel locomotive-hauled commuter coaches. It was on the non-electrified network where the 1987 Bintaro train crash occurred, the biggest single tragedy not just of the commuter network, but of the then Indonesian Railways Service Corporation LLC (Perusahaan Jawatan Kereta Api, PJKA, later on Perusahaan Umum Kereta Api or Permuka, the Indonesian Railways Public Corporation LLC) as a whole, spurring an era of change across the entire national rail network, and not just on the commuter services and the trainsets used in this venture. This happened just 3 years before the formal debut of electric commuter express services on the then active lines, that began in 1990 as part of the 65th anniversary of the electric commuter rail system, and before parts of the line from Jakarta Kota south to Gambir were changed from ground level to elevated tracks in 1991-92. Yet another train collision in the network in 1992 - this time in the Bogor main line - resulted in much of the rest of said line being double tracked.

In May 2000, the government of Japan via JICA and Tokyo Metropolitan Government donated 72 units of used Toei 6000 trains, formerly operating on Toei Mita Line. These were the first fully air-conditioned electric trains in Indonesia - the second after some of Permuka's INKA and Japan-made EMUs converted to mixed executive-business class for express trips with retrofitted AC systems. The new trains began their service as express EMUs beginning 25 August 2000.

=== Commuterline era ===
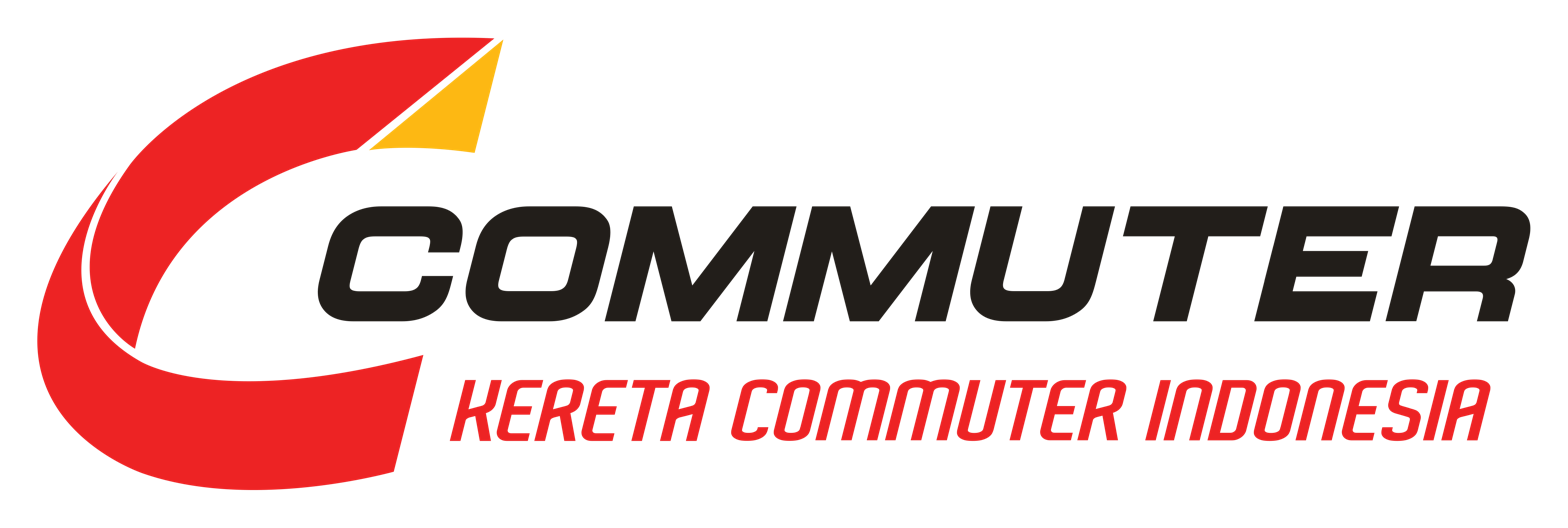
Former logo until 28 September 2020

The current form of electric train service in Jakarta was begun in 2008. Jabotabek Urban Transport Division, a sub-unit of KAI that handles commuter service around Jabodetabek, spun-off to form KAI Commuterline Jabodetabek (KCJ). Ticket revenues, rolling stock maintenance, and station management was transferred to the newly formed subsidiary, but all operational matters (e.g. scheduling and dispatching), rolling stock, stations and infrastructures remained under KAI responsibility. At the same time, all track matters and station construction and maintenance were handled by the Ministry of Transportation.

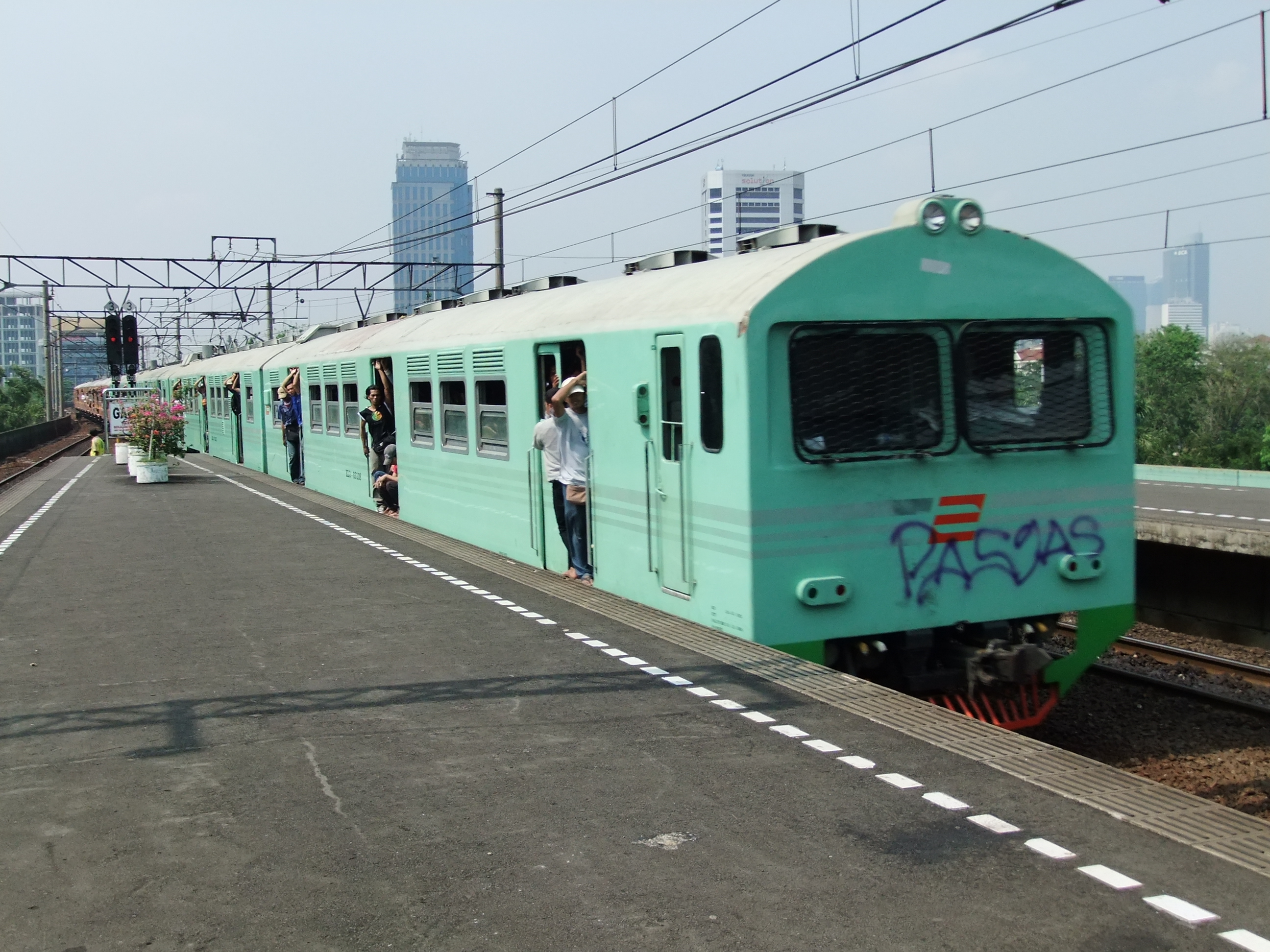
Former Economy class EMU at Gambir Station (taken in October 2009)

The modernization of the commuter railway system, however, did not begin until 2011. Network operations were greatly simplified from 37 point-to-point service patterns into six integrated lines (known as "loop line" system) all running local, stopping at every station, as all express services were abolished. Service was also simplified into two service classes: Economy class (cheaper service without air conditioning, subsidized by Ministry of Transportation) and Commuter class (more expensive service with air conditioning). On 17 April 2013, the Commuterline extension to Maja in the Green Line commenced operation. On 25 July 2013, the economy class was discontinued, leaving the Commuter class as the sole service class throughout the network. In July 2013, the operator introduced the COMMET (Commuter Electronic Ticketing) system replacing the old paper ticket system and changing the old fare system into 'progressive fare' system, as well as modernization of all 80 serving stations.

Starting on 1 April 2015, the Nambo line extension operation formally commenced. Three line extensions have been opened between 2015 and 2017: the extension of Pink Line to Tanjung Priuk station which commenced operation on 22 December 2015, the extension of Green Line to Rangkasbitung station which commenced operation on 1 April 2017, and the extension of Blue Line to Cikarang station which commenced operation on 8 October 2017. In July 2015, KA Commuter Jabodetabek served more than 850,000 passengers per day, which is almost triple the 2011 figures, but still less than 3.5% of all Jabodetabek commutes.

Until 5 March 2014, KA Commuter Jabodetabek only operates 8-car trainsets on all lines. In 2016, the operation of 12-car trainsets commenced. As of December 2019, it operates 1,057 trips per day by 90 trains. Importation of used Japanese trainsets for use in Commuterline resulted in a 2023 controversy, when the importation of the used trains were banned.

In May 2022, KAI Commuter announced some changes to the network, marking the first modification of the routing system since 2011 reform. The Loop Line was discontinued with its Jatinegara-Manggarai loop part being absorbed by the Cikarang Line, which ceased service from Manggarai to Jakarta Kota in favor of the loop and was rebranded as Cikarang Loop Line with blue-circled "C" symbol. The Nambo branch of the discontinued line was absorbed by the Central Line, which was rebranded as Bogor Line with red-circled "B" symbol.

The KRL Commuterline officially marked its centennial in 2025.

== Lines and services ==
The modernization project in 2011 introduced 6 integrated lines and 8 services which serve Greater Jakarta. In 2022, the number of lines was reduced to 5 as the Loop Line was discontinued and absorbed into Bogor Line and Cikarang Loop Line.

The network route map is recognized by color code, destination, and since 2020, a station numbering system.

Lines	Services	No. of stations	Length	Opened	Operated as KCI Line
Bogor Line	Jakarta Kota to Bogor	25^{†}	54.8 km (34.1 mi)	1930	5 December 2011
Bogor Line	Jakarta Kota to Nambo	26^{†}	51.0 km (31.7 mi)	2015	1 April 2015
Cikarang Loop Line	Cikarang–Pasar Senen/Manggarai–Kampung Bandan (full-racket)	29^{††}	87.4 km (54.3 mi)	1930	28 May 2022
Cikarang Loop Line	Cikarang–Manggarai–Angke (half-racket)	20	38.9 km (24.2 mi)	2022	28 May 2022
Rangkasbitung Line	Tanah Abang to Rangkasbitung	19	72.8 km (45.2 mi)	1899	1 April 2017
Tangerang Line	Duri to Tangerang	11	19.2 km (11.9 mi)	1899	5 December 2011
Tanjung Priok Line	Jakarta Kota to Tanjung Priuk	4	8.1 km (5.0 mi)	1885	5 December 2011 partial; feeder only 22 December 2015 fully operational
Planned
Rangkasbitung Line	Rangkasbitung to Merak	11	68.5 km (42.6 mi) Length of extension 141.3 km (87.8 mi) Total length if finished	TBA	
Bogor Line	Bogor to Sukabumi	11	57.3 km (35.6 mi) Length of extension 112.1 km (69.7 mi) Total length if finished	TBA	
Cikarang Loop Line	Cikarang to Cikampek	8	41.0 km (25.5 mi) Length of extension 143.5 km (89.2 mi) Total length if finished	TBA	
JIS Line	Jatinegara to Tanjung Priok	9	TBA	TBA	
† excluding Gambir station, which doesn't serve Commuterline trains (train passes through without stopping here) †† Including Pasar Senen Station. This station only serves trips to the north (towards Kampung Bandan). Trips to the south (towards Jatinegara) do not stop at this station.

== Ticketing and fares ==
Passengers may also purchase a card for multiple journeys, named Kartu Multi-Trip (KMT, "multitrip card"). KMT is priced at Rp 50,000 (including Rp 30,000 credit). The card has no expiry date and can be used with a minimum credit of Rp 5,000 after KCI introduced fare adjustment machines. Passengers who don't have enough credit in their KMT can top-up at fare adjustment machines or two-way ticket counters. Previously the minimum credit was Rp 13,000, based on the highest available fare in the system. The card may be topped up at the ticket counters or vending machines. Starting in October 2023 this card could also be used in other major transit systems such as Jakarta MRT, Jakarta LRT or Jabodebek LRT and Transjakarta

In addition to KCI-issued cards, passengers may also purchase bank-issued cards. Unlike KCI-issued cards which may only be used for public transit systems and station's park-and-ride facilities, these cards may also be used for goods and services payments at selected merchants, gas stations, Transjakarta BRT, selected parking facilities, and toll road payments. Currently Commuterline accepts Mandiri e-Money, BRIZZI, BNI TapCash, flazz BCA, Bank Jakarta Jakcard, and Jak Lingko.

Starting from 1 October 2019, Commuterline station gates accept tickets purchased through mobility and e-wallet apps. LinkAja! was the first to implement it, followed by JakLingko and Gojek apps in 2022. It uses QR code displayed by the app on passenger's mobile phone that can be read by scanner attached inside the system. Payment with LinkAja! can be used only if the passenger's balance is not less than Rp 13,000.00, as the payment directly deducts LinkAja balance, thus having similar mechanism as multitrip card. On the other hand, passengers using JakLingko and Gojek must choose their origin and destination before obtaining the ticket, similar to single trip cards.

However, on 16 January 2023 payment for Commuterline tickets using LinkAja! has been discontinued.

=== Fares ===
Fare for Greater Jakarta region Commuterline is charged by distance travelled, starting at Rp 3,000 for the first 25 kilometers and Rp 1,000 for every next 10 kilometers. The fare is subsidized by the Ministry of Transportation. For instance in 2016, the government allocated Rp 1.1 trillion public service obligation to Commuterline.

Prior to the introduction of distance-based fare, the fare is determined by number of stations passed. The first five stations passed is charged at Rp 3,000 and every next three stations charged at Rp 1,000. Between July and November 2013, the charges were lowered to Rp 2,000 and Rp 500 respectively, after the government subsidized the fare. Number of passengers increased by 30% after one week of introduction of the new fares.

== Stations ==
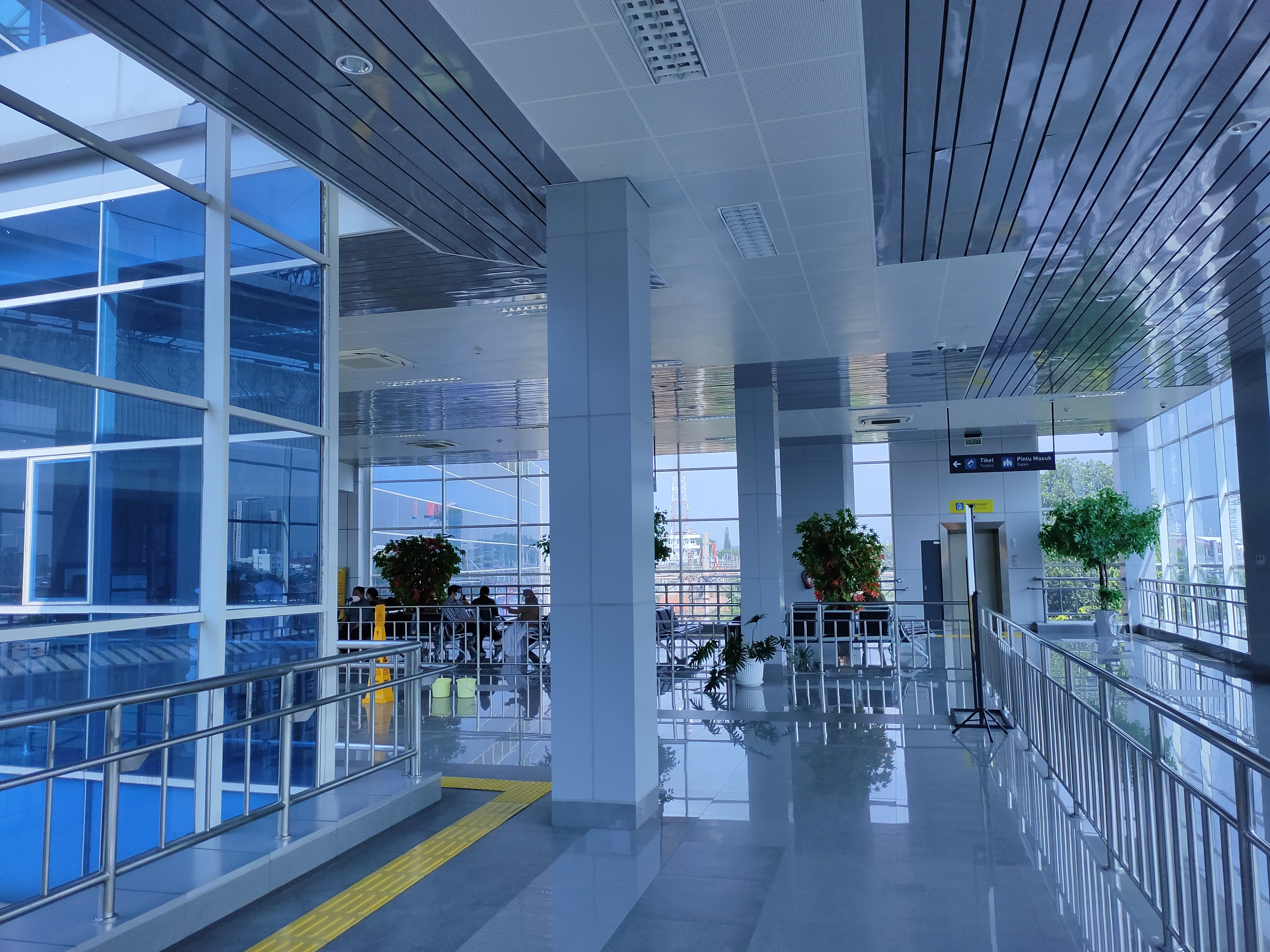
Manggarai Station is the busiest commuter rail stations in Jakarta

As of January 2019, there are 80 active and 4 inactive stations for Commuterline. All the stations have commercial zones of various sizes for operating retail stores, chain shops, and ATM booths. The stations have prayer areas, toilets, and a dispensary for emergency health service. Stations have manual ticket counters and automated ticket vending machines since 2017. Starting on 15 January 2019, all stations have a free Wi-Fi service facility for passengers.

=== Busiest statistics ===
Busiest stations
No.	Station	Total Passengers	Note	Year
1	Bogor	16,530,000	Busiest annual arrival	2023
2	Bogor	15,300,000	Busiest annual departure	2023
3	Manggarai	230,860	Highest user transfer volume daily	2023
4	Tanah Abang	155,000	2nd Highest user transfer volume daily	2023

=== List of stations ===
Bold: Terminus or interchange stations Italic: Closed for Commuterline, open for intercity trains ~~Strikethrough~~: Closed for all services

Bogor Line (including Nambo branch)		Cikarang Loop Line		Rangkasbitung Line	Tangerang Line	Tanjung Priok Line
**Jakarta Kota**; Jayakarta; Mangga Besar; Sawah Besar; Juanda; Gambir (reopening soon); Gondangdia; Cikini; **Manggarai**†; Tebet; Cawang; Duren Kalibata; Pasar Minggu Baru; Pasar Minggu; Tanjung Barat; Lenteng Agung; Universitas Pancasila; Universitas Indonesia; Pondok Cina; Depok Baru; **Depok**†; Citayam; † Some trains terminate here		**Kampung Bandan**; **Angke**†; **Duri**; **Tanah Abang**; ~~Karet~~; BNI City; Sudirman; ~~Mampang~~; **Manggarai**†; Matraman	**Angke**; **Kampung Bandan**†; Rajawali; Kemayoran; Pasar Senen; Gang Sentiong; Kramat; Pondok Jati	**Tanah Abang**; Palmerah; Kebayoran; Pondok Ranji; Jurangmangu; Sudimara; Rawa Buntu; **Serpong**†; Cisauk; Cicayur; Jatake; **Parung Panjang**†; Lumpang Parayasa (planned); Cilejit; Daru; Tenjo; Tigaraksa Podomoro (planned); **Tigaraksa**†; Cikoya; Maja; Citeras; **Rangkasbitung**; † Some trains terminate here	**Duri**; Grogol; Pesing; Taman Kota; Bojong Indah; Rawa Buaya; Kalideres; Poris; Batu Ceper; Tanah Tinggi; **Tangerang**	**Jakarta Kota**; **Kampung Bandan**; Ancol; Jakarta International Stadium; **Tanjung Priuk**
Bojong Gede; Cilebut; Sukaresmi (planned); **Bogor**	Pondok Rajeg^; Cibinong^; ~~Gunung Putri~~; **Nambo**^^ Headway every 1–2 hours.	Jatinegara; ~~Cipinang~~ (converted to depot); Klender; Buaran; Klender Baru; Cakung; Kranji; **Bekasi†**; Bekasi Timur; Tambun; Cibitung; Metland Telagamurni; **Cikarang**		**Tanah Abang**; Palmerah; Kebayoran; Pondok Ranji; Jurangmangu; Sudimara; Rawa Buntu; **Serpong**†; Cisauk; Cicayur; Jatake; **Parung Panjang**†; Lumpang Parayasa (planned); Cilejit; Daru; Tenjo; Tigaraksa Podomoro (planned); **Tigaraksa**†; Cikoya; Maja; Citeras; **Rangkasbitung**; † Some trains terminate here	**Duri**; Grogol; Pesing; Taman Kota; Bojong Indah; Rawa Buaya; Kalideres; Poris; Batu Ceper; Tanah Tinggi; **Tangerang**	**Jakarta Kota**; **Kampung Bandan**; Ancol; Jakarta International Stadium; **Tanjung Priuk**

=== List of major stations ===
Below are the list of main and terminus stations, some of them also serve intercity train lines.

Station	Establishment	Type	Line(s)	Intercity/Local station
Jakarta Kota	1926	Commuterline terminus and interchange, intercity terminus	KAI Commuter Bogor Line KAI Commuter Tanjung Priok Line	Yes
Gambir	1884	Intercity train terminus^{a}	(Not yet in service)	Yes
Manggarai	1918	Commuterline interchange and terminus (some services)	KAI Commuter Bogor Line KAI Commuter Cikarang Loop Line	Under construction
Jatinegara	1910	Commuterline interchange and terminus (nominal loop), westbound intercity stop^{b}	KAI Commuter Cikarang Loop Line	Yes
Tanah Abang	1910	Commuterline terminus and interchange	KAI Commuter Cikarang Loop Line KAI Commuter Rangkasbitung Line	No
Duri	1899	Commuterline terminus and interchange^{c}	KAI Commuter Cikarang Loop Line KAI Commuter Tangerang Line	No
Tangerang	1899	Commuterline terminus	KAI Commuter Tangerang Line	No
Angke	1899	Commuterline terminus (some services)	KAI Commuter Cikarang Loop Line	No
Kampung Bandan	N/A	Commuterline interchange and terminus (some services)	KAI Commuter Cikarang Loop Line KAI Commuter Tanjung Priok Line	No
Tanjung Priuk	1925	Commuterline terminus	KAI Commuter Tanjung Priok Line	No
Pasar Senen	1925	Intercity terminus, westbound local train stop and northbound Commuterline stop^{d}	KAI Commuter Cikarang Loop Line	Yes
Depok	1881	Commuterline terminus (some services)	KAI Commuter Bogor Line	No
Citayam	1873	Commuterline interchange (branch line services)	KAI Commuter Bogor Line	No
Bogor	1881	Commuterline terminus	KAI Commuter Bogor Line	Yes^{b}
Nambo	1997	Commuterline terminus (branch line services)	KAI Commuter Bogor Line	No
Bekasi	1887	Commuterline terminus (some services), local and intercity train stop	KAI Commuter Cikarang Loop Line	Yes
Cikarang	1890	Commuterline terminus, local and intercity train stop	KAI Commuter Cikarang Loop Line	Yes
Serpong	1899	Commuterline terminus (some services)	KAI Commuter Rangkasbitung Line	No
Parung Panjang	1899	Commuterline terminus (some services)	KAI Commuter Rangkasbitung Line	No
Tigaraksa	1996	Commuterline terminus (some services)	KAI Commuter Rangkasbitung Line	No
Rangkasbitung	1899	Commuterline terminus, local and intercity train stop	KAI Commuter Rangkasbitung Line	Yes

^a Currently Gambir station does not serve as Commuterline stop, instead focusing on intercity train services. Passengers who travel to areas near Merdeka Square, could depart at the nearby Gondangdia or Juanda stations.
^b Southbound local trains (operated by KAI, serving trips from Bogor to Sukabumi/Cianjur) starts and ends from Bogor Paledang station, within walking by skywalk from Bogor station.
^c Duri Station was planned to be the transit for Airport Commuter Train, which was under construction in 2014 and started operation in 2017.
^d Pasar Senen station only serves counterclockwise, full-racket services of Cikarang Loop Line towards Kampung Bandan or Jakarta Kota (minority service). Trains towards Bekasi or Cikarang does not stop here.

== Rolling stock ==
A commuter train before the reform (taken on 2011)

A commuter train after the reform

Comparison of train conditions before and after the early 2010s railway reform

Commuterline rolling stocks are composed of second-hand rail cars imported from Japan of Tokyo Metro, Toyo Rapid Railway, JR East (in which KAI Commuter has strategic partnerships with), and Tokyu Railways. All of these cars are legally classified as executive-class cars (K1). Domestically made air-conditioned cars produced by Industri Kereta Api (INKA) are no longer in service, although those trains will operate on Solo-Yogya Commuterline in Central Java. Trains are generally formed of 8, 10, or 12 cars, with a capacity of 80–110 passengers per car. The system had 1,020 cars as of July 2019.

Train without air conditioning (mainly economy class) is no longer operated as KAI Commuter (the operator) begins the single-service operation of air-conditioned trainsets. One set of ex-economy classes (Holec) has been retrofitted with air conditioning by INKA.

The Toei 6000 series began service in 2000 and was the first air-conditioned train type to be scrapped in December 2015. They are replaced by a huge influx of newer secondhand 205 series trains.

On 1 January 2016, the ex-JR East 103 series was retired from service.

In 2023, KAI filed a request to import the E217 series from JR East. However, this request was denied by the Ministry of Industry instead, it was suggested that KAI appoint INKA and CRRC Qingdao Sifang to supply EMUs for use on the KRL Commuterline network.

On the 1 February 2025, CRRC imported a 1 SFC120V train set to undergo testing in the Bogor line. The second train set arrived in Indonesia on 12 March 2025. On 17 February 2025, INKA successfully manufactured iE 305 train sets in Madiun. On March 17, 2025, 12 iE 305 cars were transported to Solo Jebres Station where they will undergo testing in the KRL Commuter Yogyakarta line. On 19 April 2025, iE 305 cars finished testing and were sent to a KRL depot in Depok. On 29 April 2025, several Tokyo Metro 6000 series cars, as well as 05 series cars, were retired and laid to rest next to the Depok depot, as newer commuter trains had already arrived to replace them.

=== Air-conditioned rolling stock ===
EMU classes mentioned as current/active by KAIC on 30 October 2026:

Class	Internal name	Image	Units	In service	Cars per Set	Manufacturer	Remarks
205-0 series 205-5000 series	ED106 EA205		812	762	8, 10, 12	(Japan) Nippon Sharyo, Kawasaki Heavy Industries, Hitachi, Ltd., Kinki Sharyo, Tokyu Car Corporation (1984–1994)	205-0 ex-JR East Saikyo Line, Yokohama Line, Nambu Line, and Musashino Line rolling stock, 2013–present 205-5000 series ex-Musashino Line rolling stock, 2018–present
SFC120-V CLI-125	EA206		132	132	12	(China) CRRC Qingdao Sifang (2025)	2025–present
iE305 CLI-225	EA207		192	60	12	(Indonesia) - (Japan) INKA, J-TREC (2025)	2025–present

=== Transferred to Yogyakarta Line ===
Class	Internal name	Image	Units	In service	Cars per Set	Manufacturer	Remarks
KfW i9000	EA202		40	40	8	(Indonesia) - (Germany) INKA, Bombardier (2011)	Financed by KfW, 2011–2019, all transferred since 2022
205-5000 series	EA205		16	16	8	(Japan) Nippon Sharyo (1984–1994)	205-5000 ex-JR East, transferred from KRL Commuterline Jabodetabek

=== Future air-conditioned rolling stock ===
Class	Internal name	Image	Units	In service	Cars per Set	Manufacturer	Remarks
TBA

=== Retired/suspended air-conditioned rolling stock ===
Class	Internal name	Image	Units	In service	Cars per Set	Manufacturer	Remarks
Tokyo Metro 6000 series	ED303 EA204		270	0	8, 10	(Japan) Nippon Sharyo, Kawasaki Heavy Industries, Hitachi, Ltd., Kinki Sharyo, Kisha Seizo, Tokyu Car Corporation (1968–1990)	ex-Tokyo Metro Chiyoda Line rolling stock, 2011–2026
Tokyo Metro 7000 series	ED301		40	0	8	(Japan) Nippon Sharyo, Kawasaki Heavy Industries, Kinki Sharyo, Tokyu Car Corporation (1974–1989)	ex-Tokyo Metro Yūrakuchō Line rolling stock, 2011–2025
Tokyo Metro 05 series	ED302		80	0	8	(Japan) Nippon Sharyo, Kawasaki Heavy Industries, Hitachi, Ltd., Kinki Sharyo, Tokyu Car Corporation (1988–1991)	ex-Tokyo Metro Tōzai Line rolling stock, 2010–2025
203 series	ED304		50	0	8, 10, 12	(Japan) Kawasaki Heavy Industries, Kinki Sharyo, Tokyu Car Corporation (1982–1986)	ex-JNR/JR East Joban Line rolling stock, 2011–2025
Tokyu 8500 series	ED202		64	0	8	(Japan) Tokyu Car Corporation (1975–1991)	ex-Tokyu Den-en-toshi Line rolling stock, 2006–2025
Tokyu 8000 series	ED201		24	0	12	(Japan) Tokyu Car Corporation (1969–1985)	ex-Tokyu Toyoko Line and Oimachi Line rolling stock, 2006–April 2024
Toei 6000 series	ED102		72	0	4, 6, 8	(Japan) Nippon Sharyo, Kawasaki Heavy Industries, Hitachi, Ltd., Alna Kohi (1968–1976)	ex-Toei Mita Line rolling stock, 2000–2016. One cabin car preserved at Depok Depot
Tokyo Metro 5000 series	ED105		30	0	8, 10	(Japan) Nippon Sharyo, Kawasaki Heavy Industries, Kinki Sharyo, Tokyu Car Corporation, Kisha Seizo, Teikoku Sharyo (1964–1967)	ex-Tokyo Metro Tōzai Line rolling stock, 2007– January 2020
Tōyō Rapid 1000 series	ED104		30	0	8, 10	(Japan) Nippon Sharyo, Kawasaki Heavy Industries, Kinki Sharyo, Tokyu Car Corporation, Hitachi, Ltd., Kisha Seizo, Teikoku Sharyo (1964–1967)	ex-Tōyō Rapid Railway line rolling stock, 2007–2019
Holec AC	EA101		24	0	8	(Indonesia) - (South Korea) INKA, Woojin Industrial (2013–14)	former 1994–2001 EMU economy class Holec trains retrofitted with AC, 2014–2015, currently suspended
103 series	ED103		16	0	4, 8	(Japan) Nippon Sharyo, Kawasaki Heavy Industries, Kinki Sharyo, Hitachi, Ltd., Teikoku Sharyo, Tokyu Car Corporation, Kisha Seizo (1963–1984)	ex-JNR/JR East Musashino Line rolling stock, 2004–2016
KRL-I	EA201		8	0	4	(Indonesia) INKA, LEN, Pindad (2001)	2001–2015

=== Non-air-conditioned rolling stock (all retired) ===
Class	Internal name	Image	Units	In service	Cars per Set	Manufacturer	Remarks
BN-Holec	EA101		128	0	4	(Germany) (Belgium) (Netherlands) - (Indonesia) Bombardier, BN, Holec, INKA (1994–2001)	1994–2013, some modified to become diesel commuter trains or Holec AC
Rheostatik	ED101		120	0	3, 4, 6	(Japan) - (Indonesia) Nippon Sharyo, Kawasaki Heavy Industries, Hitachi, Ltd., INKA (1976–1987)	1976–2013, scrapped or stored
ESS 100/200/300/400/700 series	N/A		30	0	2	(Netherlands) - (United States) General Electric, Heemaf, Westinghouse (ca. 1925)	1925–1960s, converted to locomotive hauled coaches or DEMU
INKA-Hitachi	EA102		24	0	4	(Japan) - (Indonesia) Hitachi, Ltd., INKA (1997)	1997–2013, scrapped or stored
ABB Hyundai	N/A		8	0	4	(Germany) (South Korea) - (Indonesia) ABB, Hyundai Precision, INKA (1994)	1994–2001, some modified to become diesel commuter trains

== Controversies ==
=== Incidents and accidents ===
- On 18 June 2011, during the trial for the new Commuterline services, angry passengers vandalized a former Tokyu 8500 series trainset number 8613F on idle at Jakarta Kota station by stoning it, damaging its crucial components, as a protest toward prolonged waiting time for regular subsidized Economy class EMU.
- On Thursday, 4 October 2012, a former Tokyo Metro 05 series trainset (no. 05-007F) travelling as 435 Train derailed on a switch before Cilebut station, with the third car impacted station platform's end. No fatal injury reported, the whole trainset was later written off due to damage beyond repair.
- 9 December 2013 – A former Tokyo Metro 7000 series trainset (no. 7121F) travelling as 1131 Train on Serpong-Jakarta line collided with Pertamina tanker truck at Bintaro Permai railway intersection, Jakarta. Seven people (including the three train drivers) were killed in the crash. The trainset was subsequently written-off.
- 23 September 2015 – Two electric trains (former 205 series trainset no. 205-54F and 205-123F) travelling as 1154 Train and 1156 Train were involved in a rear-end collision at Juanda Station. No one was killed, but 42 passengers were hurt, with some required intensive treatment. Some cars involved returned to service combined in trainset 205-54F, while the rest was written off.
- On Sunday, 10 March 2019, a former Tokyu 8500 series trainset (no. 8612F) travelling as 1722 Train on Jatinegara–Bogor line derailed between Cilebut and Bogor station. 1722 Train crashed, rolled over, and hit an overhead catenary pole until it collapsed and the train body dented on the front side. Meanwhile, car no. 8712 and 8912 rolled over. There are no reports of casualties, the four undamaged cars were joined to trainset 8610F to form a 12-car trainset and the rest were written off.
- On 27 April 2026 a former Tokyo Metro 6000 series trainset (no. 6024F) travelling as train no. 5568 on Cikarang Loop Line was struck from behind by Argo Bromo Anggrek train no. 4 bound for Surabaya Pasar Turi at Bekasi Timur station. The 6024 train was due to depart but put into halt after a CLI-125 series trainset travelling as train no. 5181 from opposite direction struck a Green SM taxi cab on a level crossing nearby. KA 4's CC206 locomotive crushed half of the last coach of 5568 train. Currently 88 injuries are reported, at least 14 of them are fatal.

==== Pre-2011 route and services reform ====
The accidents mentioned below involved trains operated by KAI Commuter's predecessor systems, such as ESS (1925-1939), DKA/PNKA/PJKA Jakarta Exploitation (1945-1976), Jabotabek Urban Railway (1976-1999), and Divisi Jabotabek (1999-2011), before the introduction of standard Commuterline service in July 2011 and standard Commuterline routes in December 2011.

- On 27 June 1928, a Westinghouse EMU of the State Electric Railway (then still under Dutch East Indies colonial rule) from the direction of Kemayoran station overran the terminating tracks of (currently inactive) Batavia Noord station, hitting a horse-drawn carriage on the road beside the station. No human casualty reported
- 20 September 1968, an Economy local train hauled by class 3200 electric locomotive travelling as 406 Train to Bogor collided with another economy train (309 Train) to Jakarta near Ratu Jaya, Depok. 46 deaths and 115 injuries reported. The crash was attributed to malfunctioning indicator in the signaling system as well as lack of verification by the dispatcher.
- 2 November 1993, two Economy train, both of Rheostatic EMU class from 1976 and 1980s batch, running the Jakarta Kota-Bogor line on opposite directions were involved in a head on collision near Ratu Jaya, Depok around 07:30 am during the morning rush hour. 20 people were killed, including drivers of both trains, and further 100 was injured. Being the same type, 4 surviving cars from both side were combined, colloquially known as CatDog trainset. The rest were written off. This accident prompted the government to start double-tracking project of the Depok-Bogor segment of the line.
- 19 August 2000, A EMU Hitachi trainset running 628 Train (Economy class) from Jakarta Kota to Tangerang was hit from behind by Indocement factory coal supply train no. 228 Train en route between Kampung Bandan and Angke stations. 3 people died on this accident including 2 train crews on both trains. The Hitachi train involved was stored for a long time afterward, before being scrapped. On a further note, Tangerang line used to continue from Duri all the way to Kota before 2011.
- 18 November 2003, EMU Holec trainset KL2-94202F running 396 Train (Business) on Tanah Abang-Serpong service suffered an electrical fire ignited by overhead wire snapped by overload triggered by failure of the trains' component before reaching Kebayoran station. The two frontmost cars of the train was engulfed in the inferno.
- 4 October 2003, EMU Holec KL3-97242F travelling as 490 Train (Economy) bound for Bogor collided with the rear end of a fellow EMU Holec train KL3-94212F traveling as 488 Train (Economy) also bound for Jakarta Kota on this line between Cilebut and Bogor stations. 39 people were injured.
- 12 December 2003, a EMU Rheostatic trainset KL3-76112F set in idle position on Bogor station prepared for 459 Train (Economy) slid uncommanded down the line. It continues all the way until stopped by the steeper upward climb of the Manggarai-Cikini elevated track. Further investigation proved the trainset was not secured enough to prevent it to slide away from idle position.
- 30 June 2005, EMU Rheostatic KL3-76110F travelling as 583 Train (Economy) bound for Jakarta Kota collided with the rear end of a EMU Holec trainset KL3-2000202F traveling as 585 Train (Economy) on this line between Tanjung Barat and Pasar Minggu stations. 5 deaths and 113 injuries reported.
- 2 January 2007, 241 Train (Economy) running on Bojong Gede-Jakarta Kota service derailed while reaching track 10 of Jakarta Kota terminus station, no casualty reported.
- On 18 July 2007, a EMU Holec train trainset no. KL3-97228F running 423 Train (Economy) bound for Jakarta Kota was hit from behind by a locomotive being sent to Pasar Senen to carry 120 Train Jayabaya while stopping at Pondokjati station. No injury reported. The EMU set was able to continue its journey without further incident.
- On 30 October 2008, a former Toei 6000 set number 6181F train serving Bekasi to Jakarta line via Pasar Senen variant of the line (at the time being the main route for this line) as 421 AC Economy class train was hit from behind by Antaboga 1001 freight train on a track segment between Kemayoran and Kampung Bandan stations. Surviving cars of 6181F returned into service after another accident involving 6151F (mentioned below) opened the way to trainset reconfiguration in 2009.
- 5 June 2009, EMU Holec travelling as 521 Train (Economy) bound for Jakarta Kota collided with the rear end of a former Toyo Rapid 1000 series trainset traveling as 265 Train (Express) on this line between Tebet and Manggarai stations.
- 4 August 2009 – Former Toei 6000 series trainset no. 15F traveling as 211 Train (Express) collided with the rear end of EMU Holec KL3-97234F travelling as 549 Train (Economy) on between Bogor and Cilebut stations. Assistant driver and a technician on board 211 Train was killed. Some cars from 211 Train involved returned to service redistributed to other trainsets, including 6181F and shortened 4-car 6151F well until Commuterline era, while the rest (including the Holec trainset) was written off.

== Gallery ==
=== Rolling stock ===
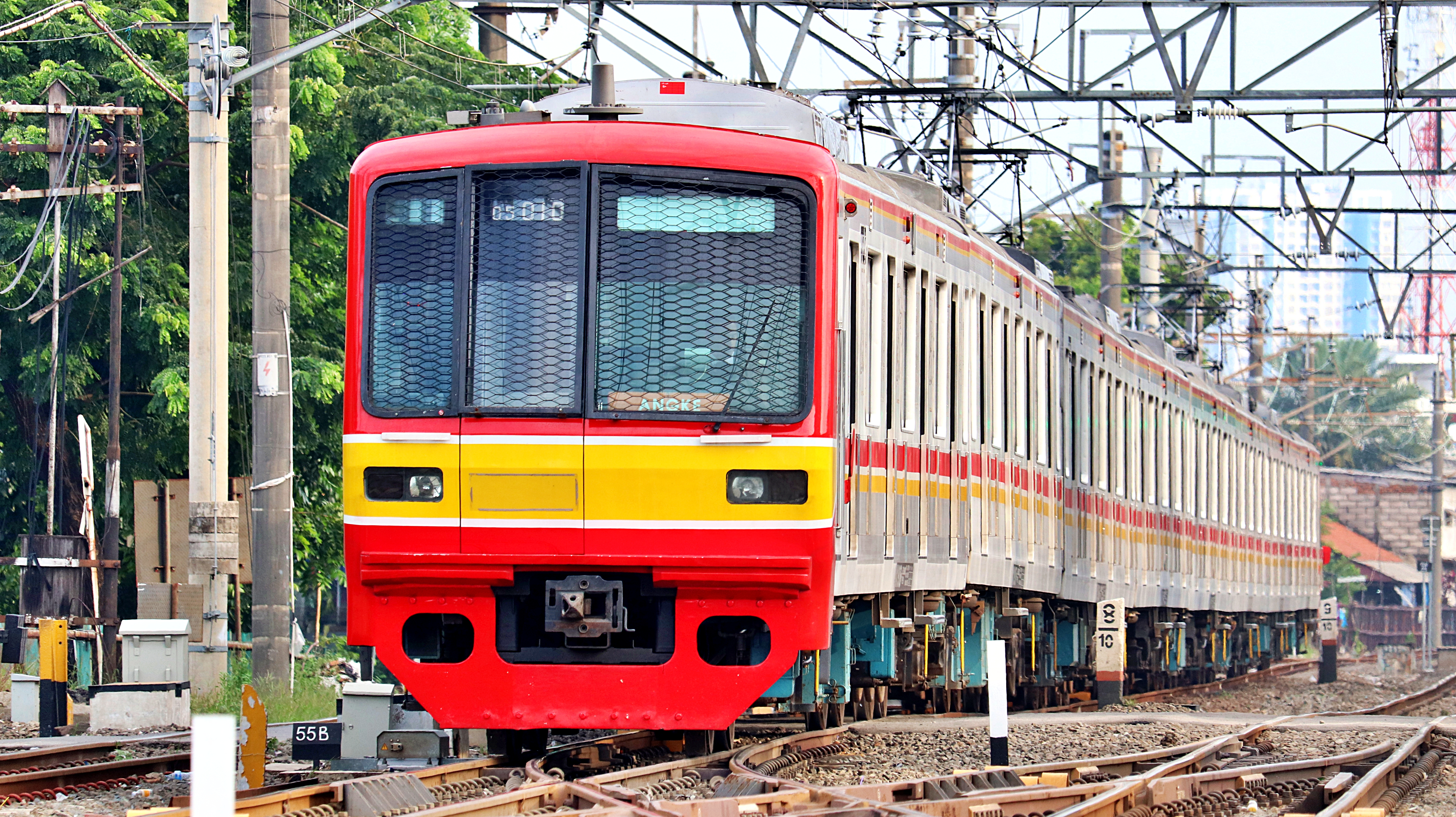
Tokyo Metro Tozai Line 05 series

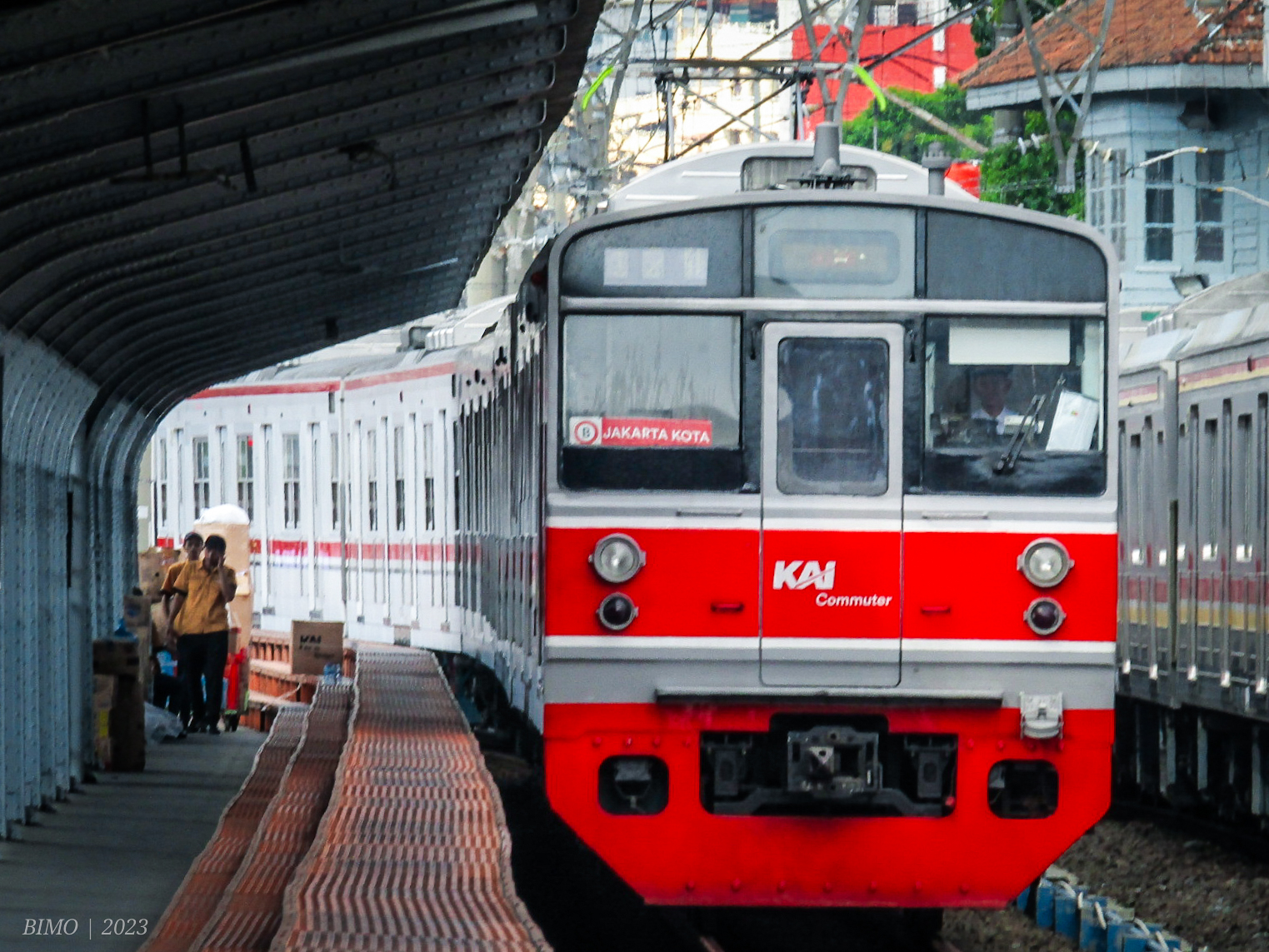
Joban Line 203 series

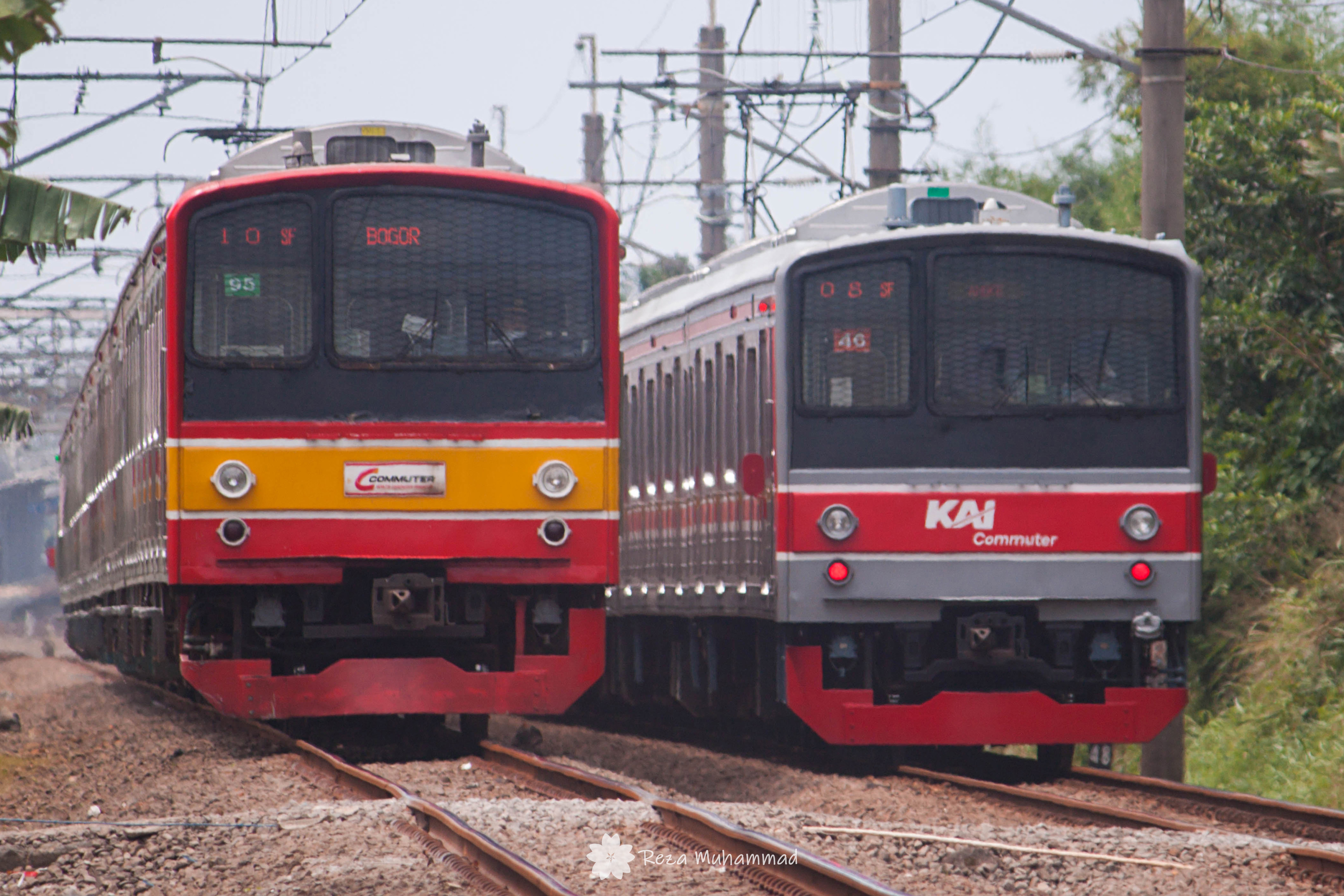
Saikyo Line 205–0 series & Former Musashino Line 205–5000 series

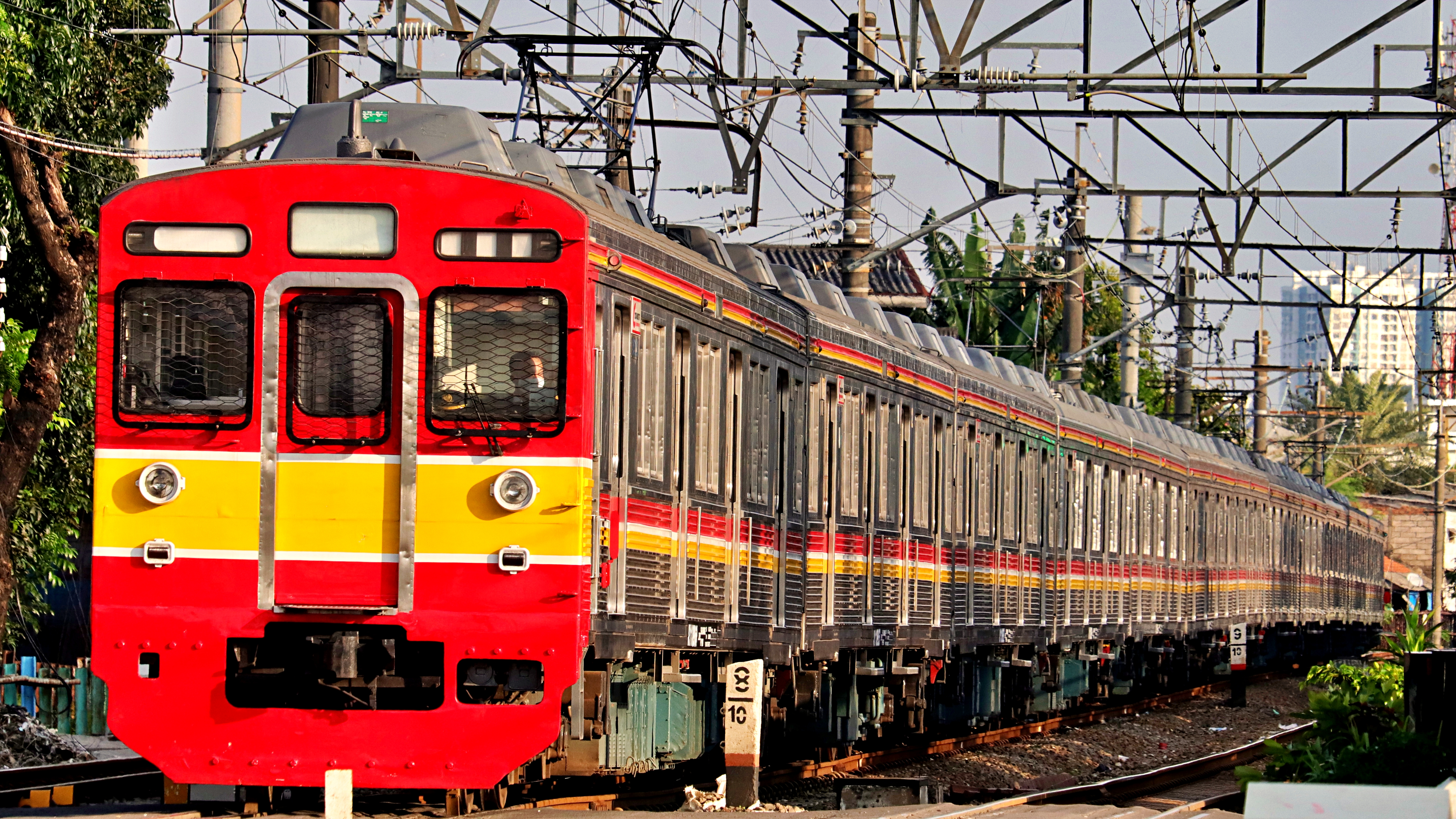
Tokyu Toyoko Line 8500 series

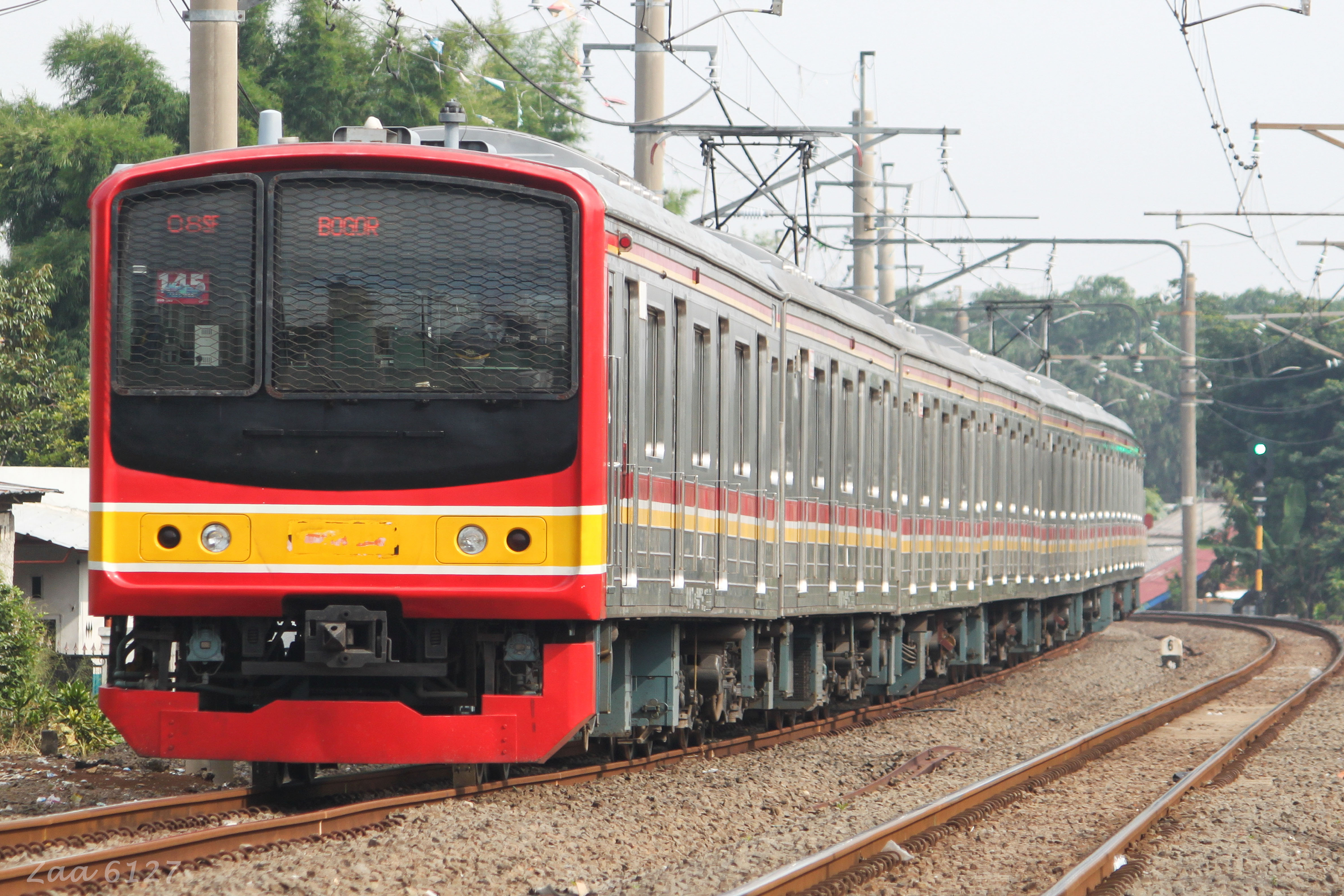
Musashino Line 205–5000 series (marchen design)

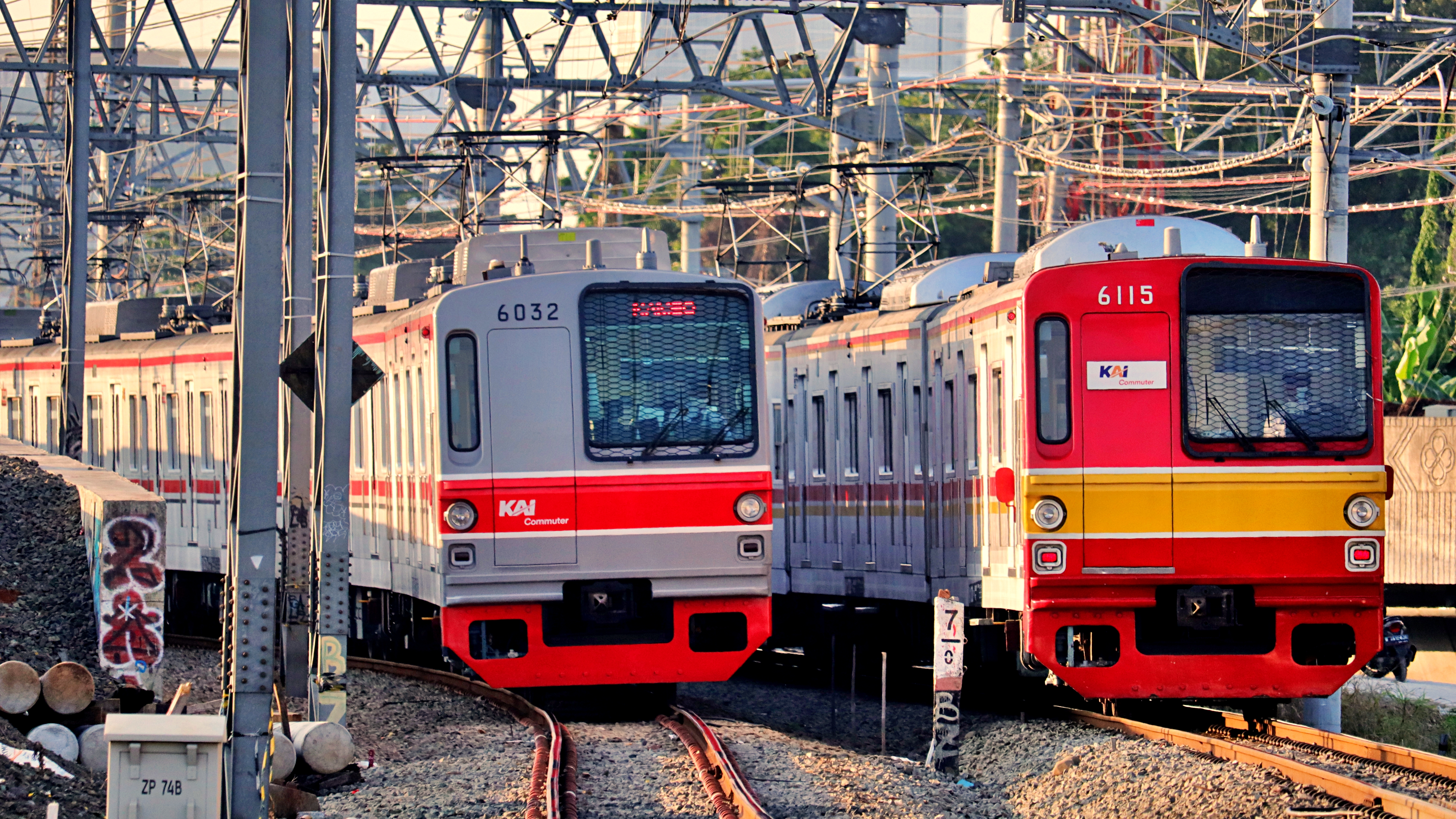
Tokyo Metro Chiyoda Line 6000 series

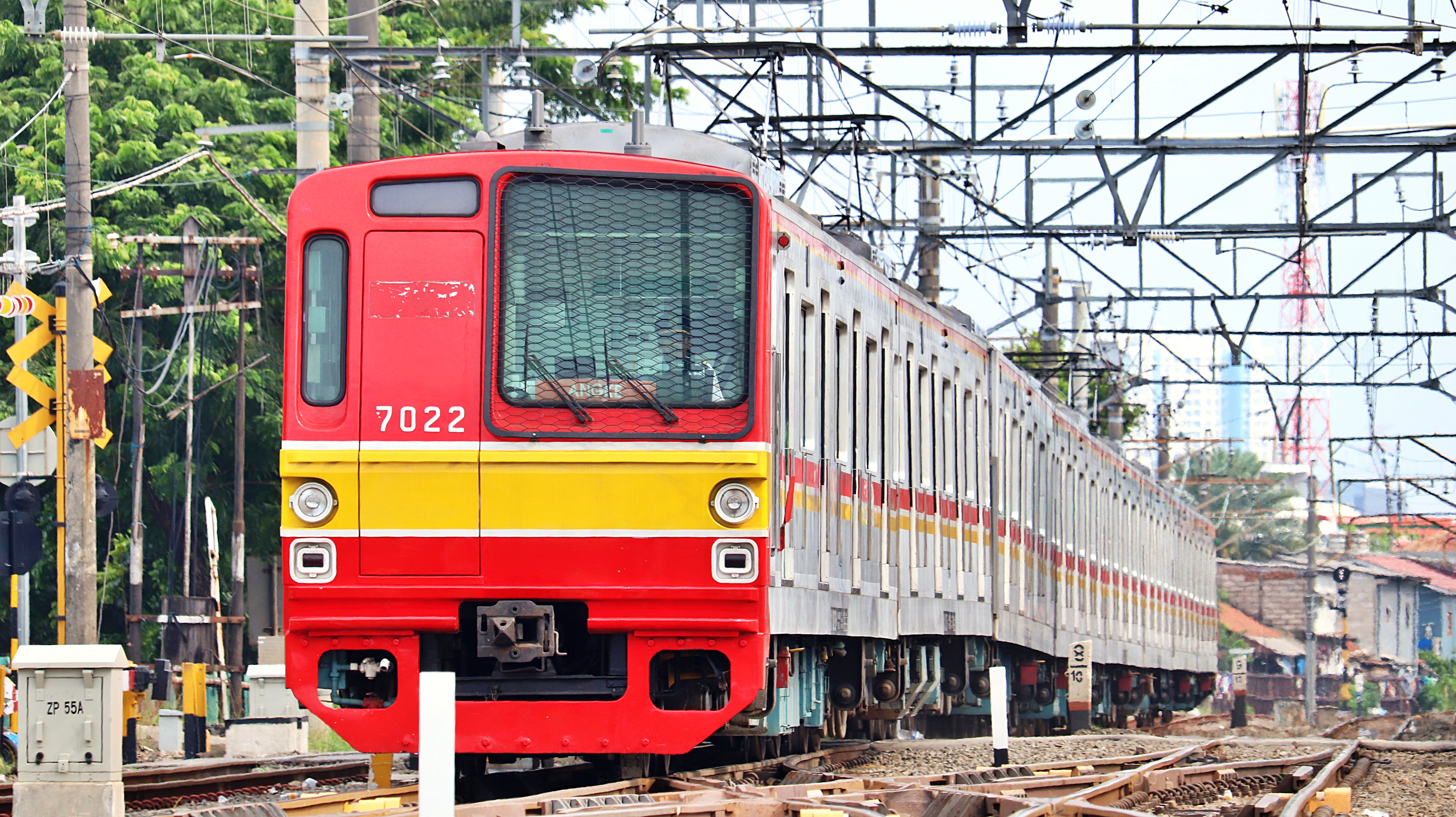
Tokyo Metro Yurakucho Line 7000 series

=== Stations ===
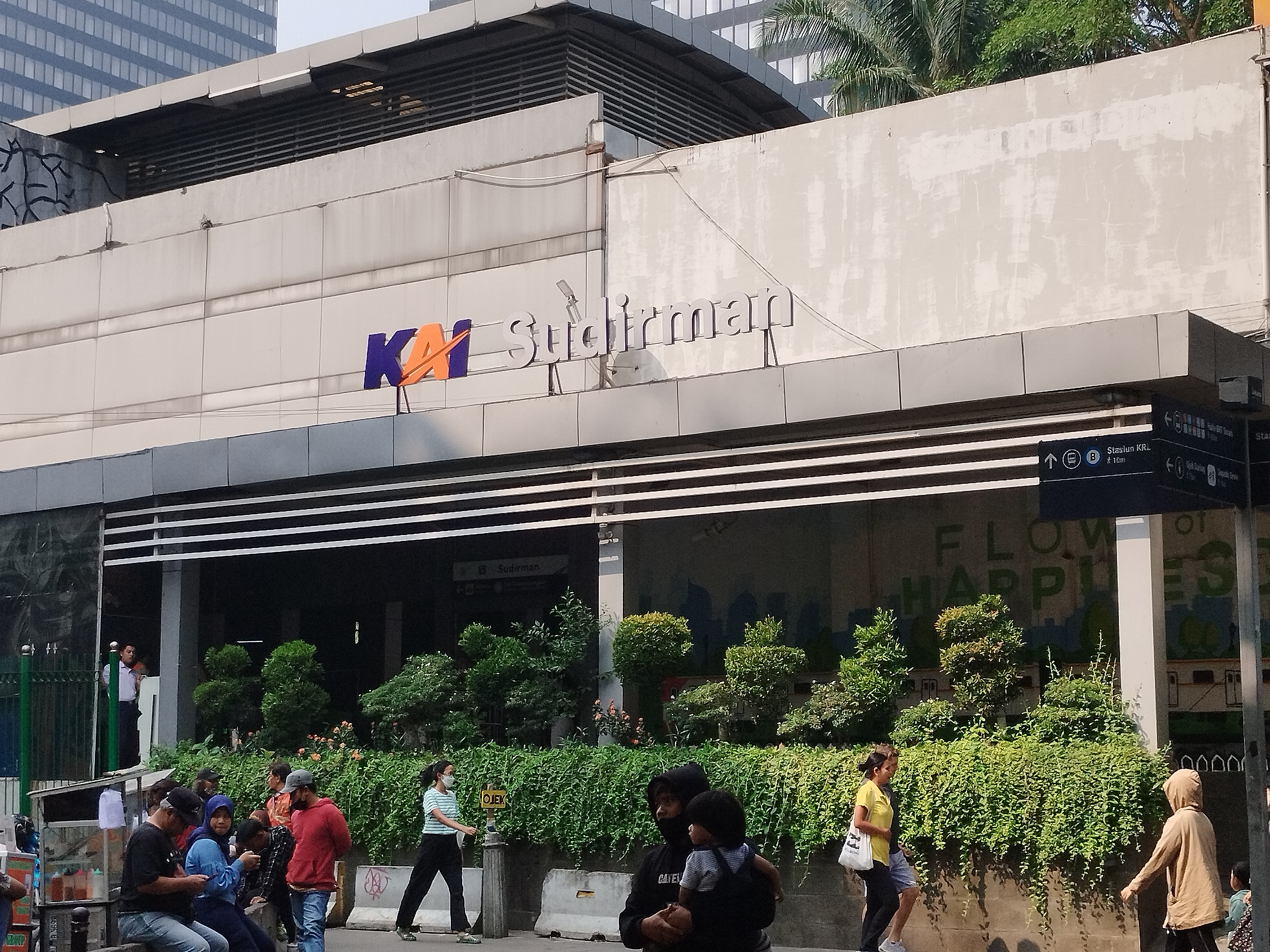
Sudirman Station

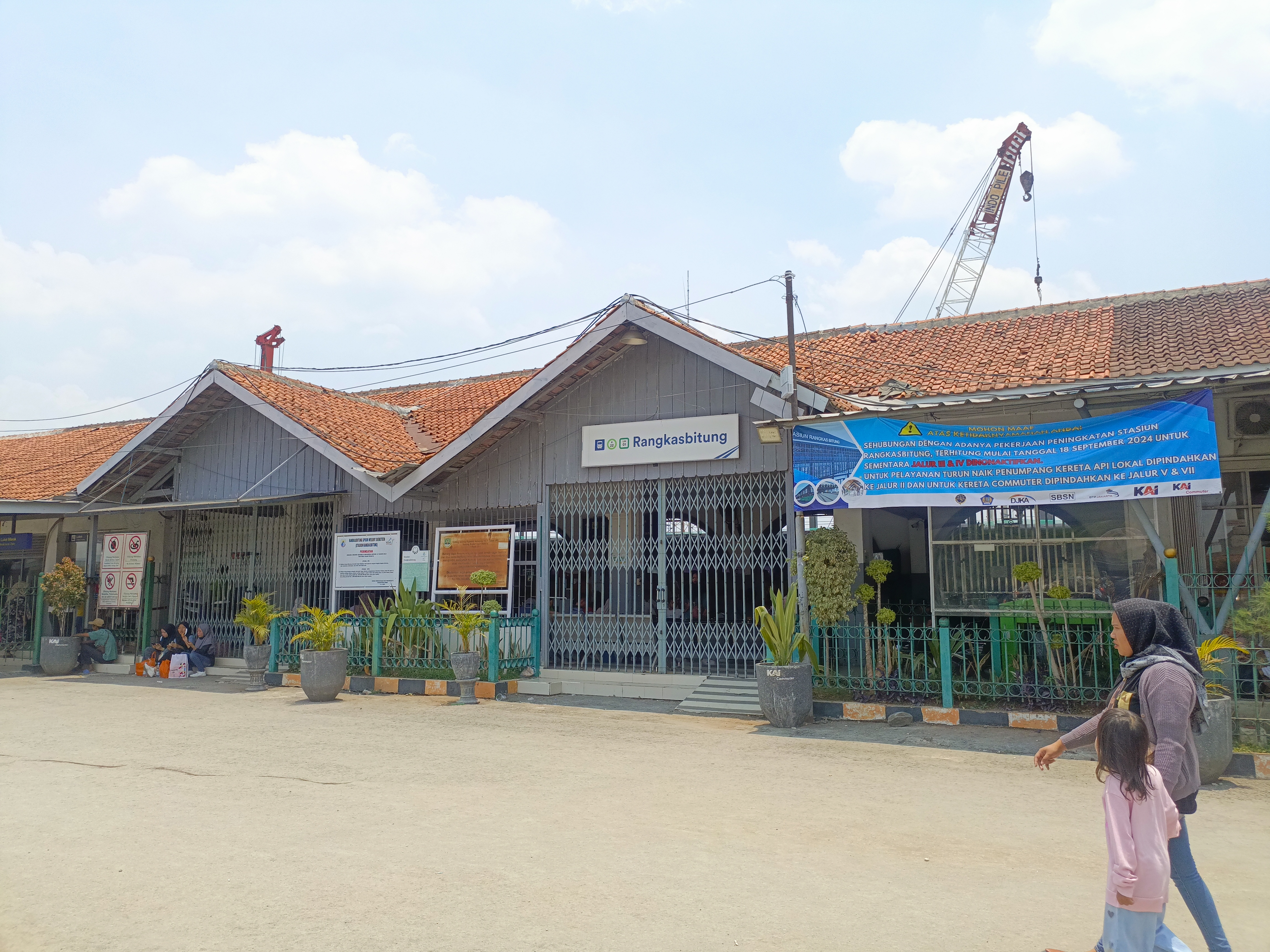
Rangkasbitung Station

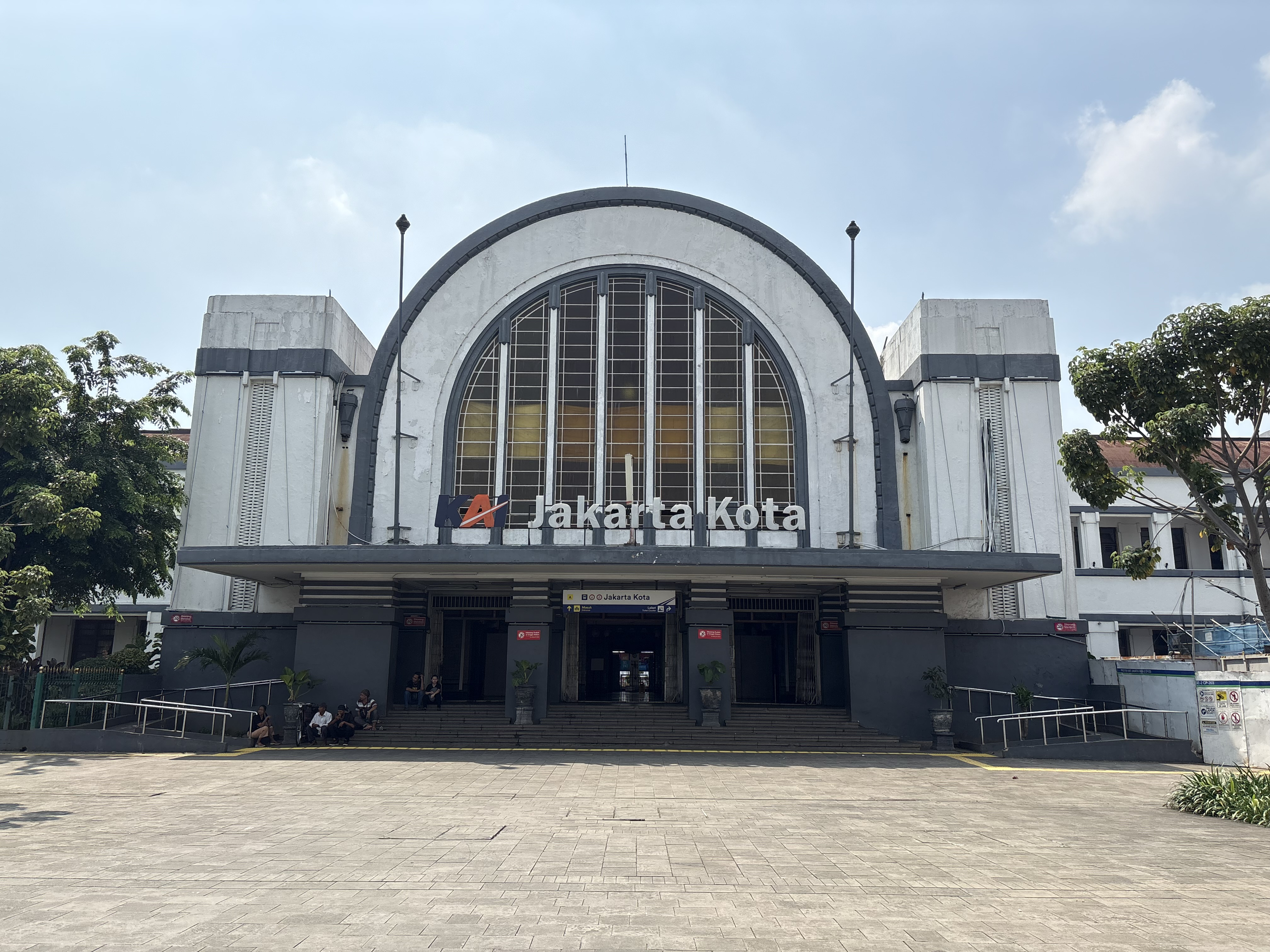
Jakarta Kota Station

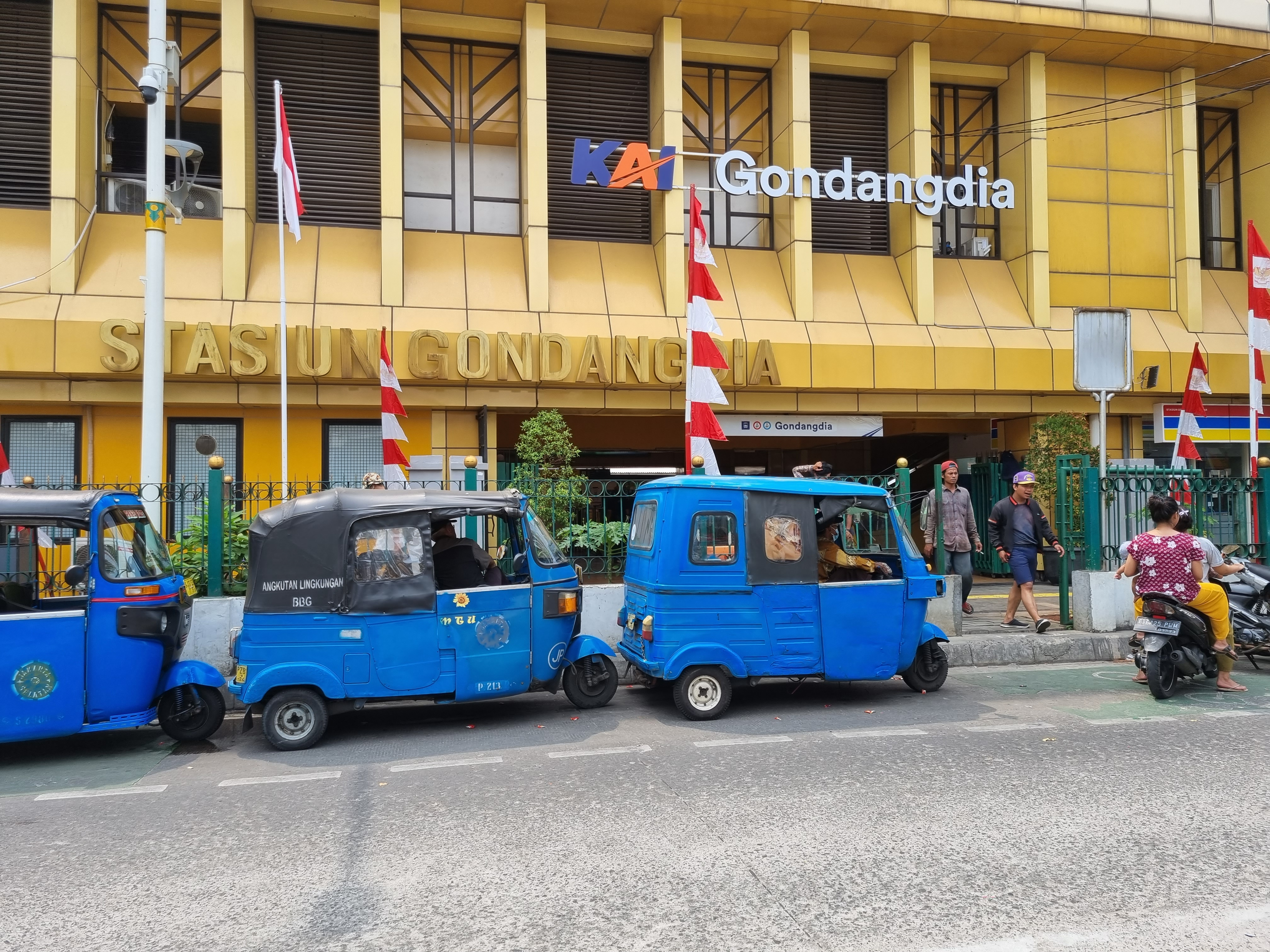
Gondangdia Station

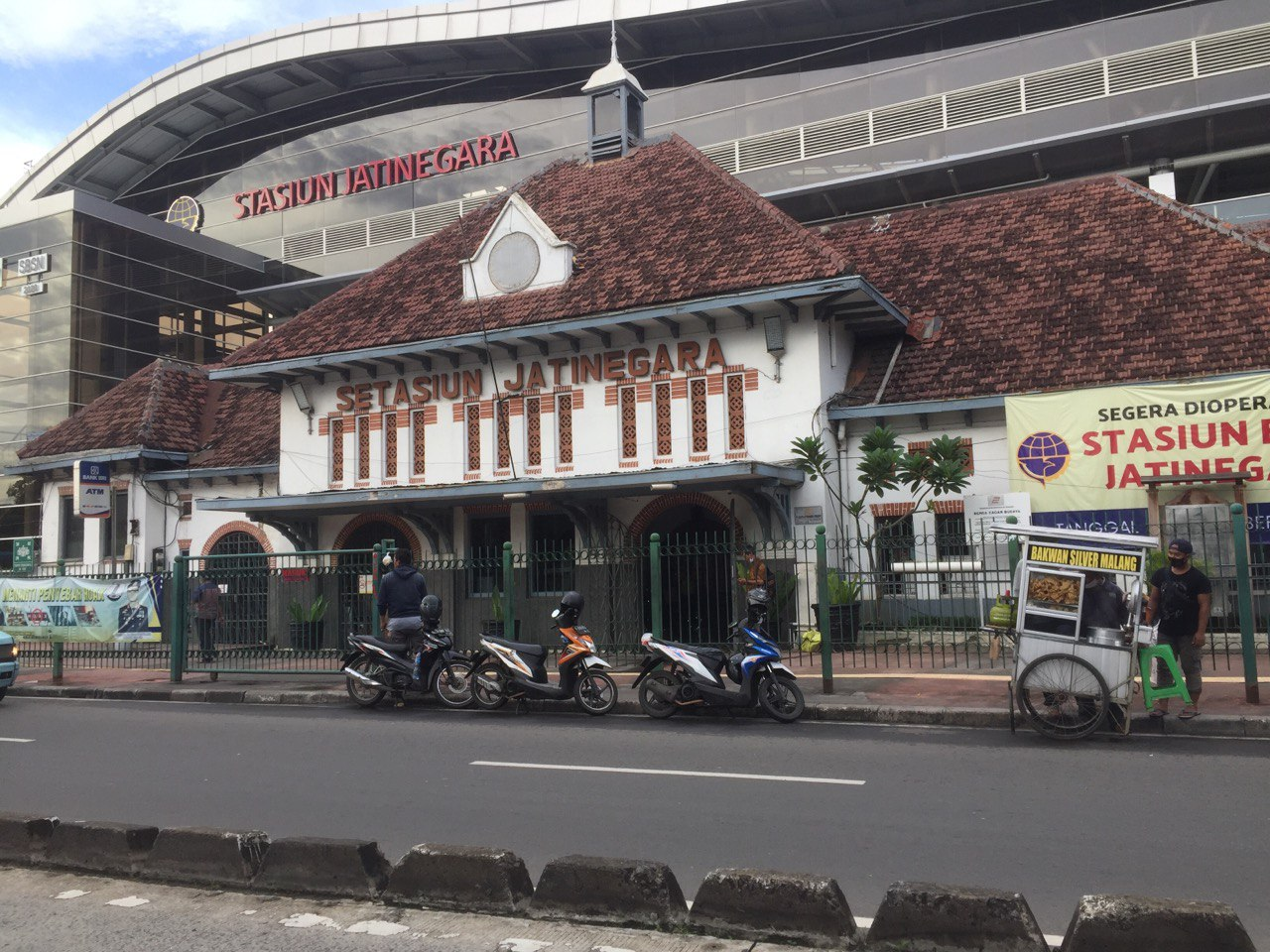
Jatinegara Station

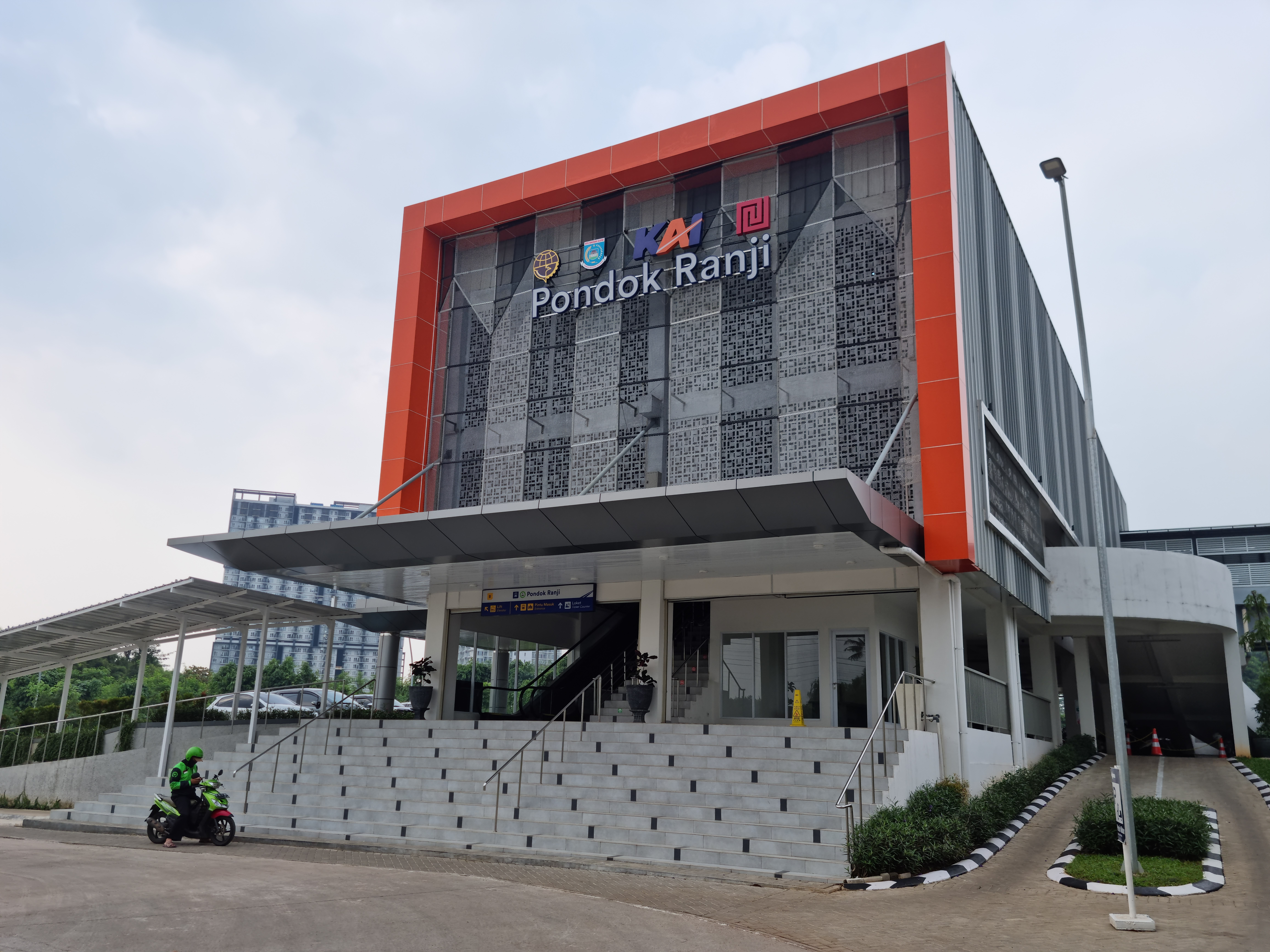
Pondok Ranji Station

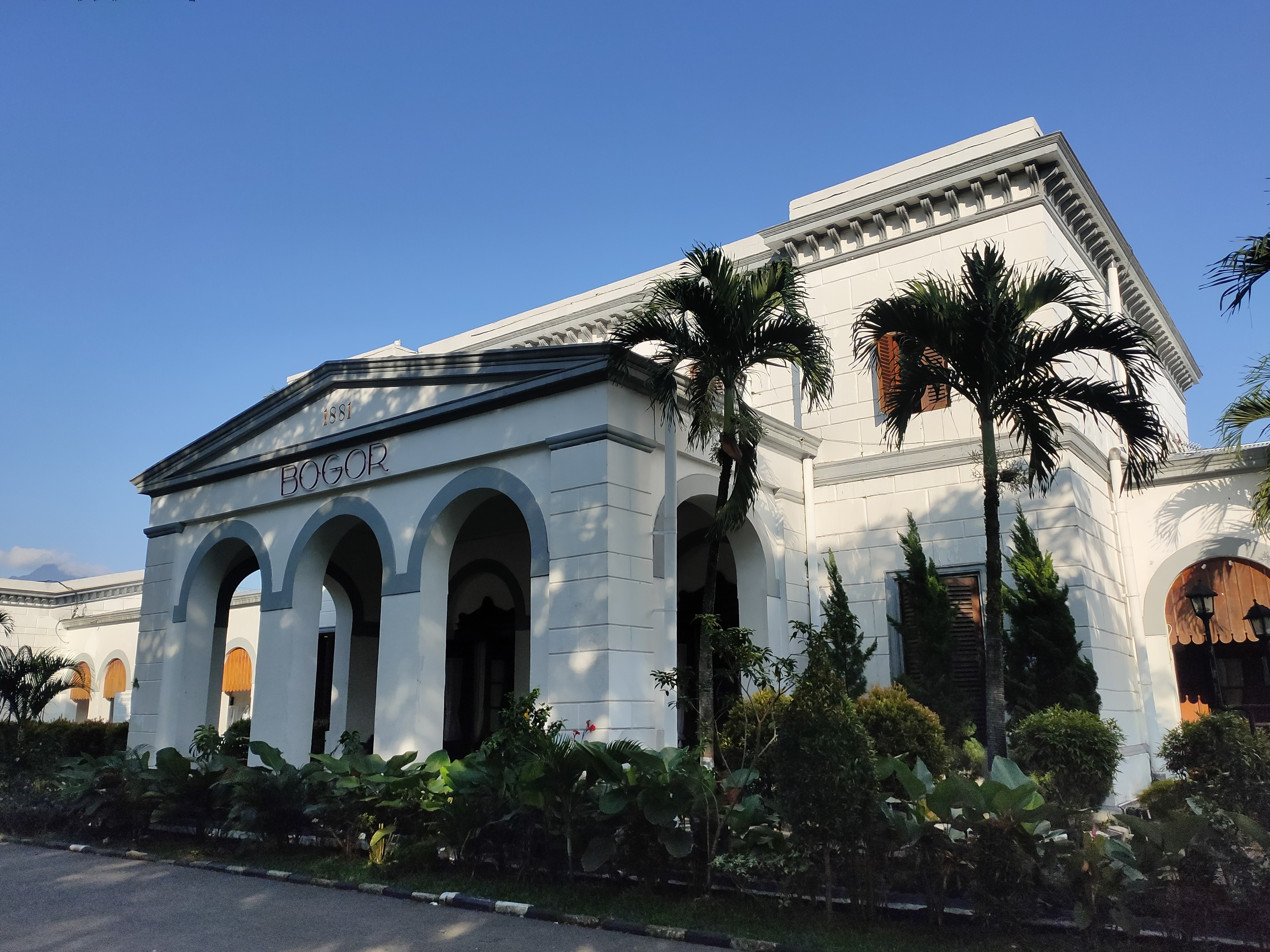
Bogor Station

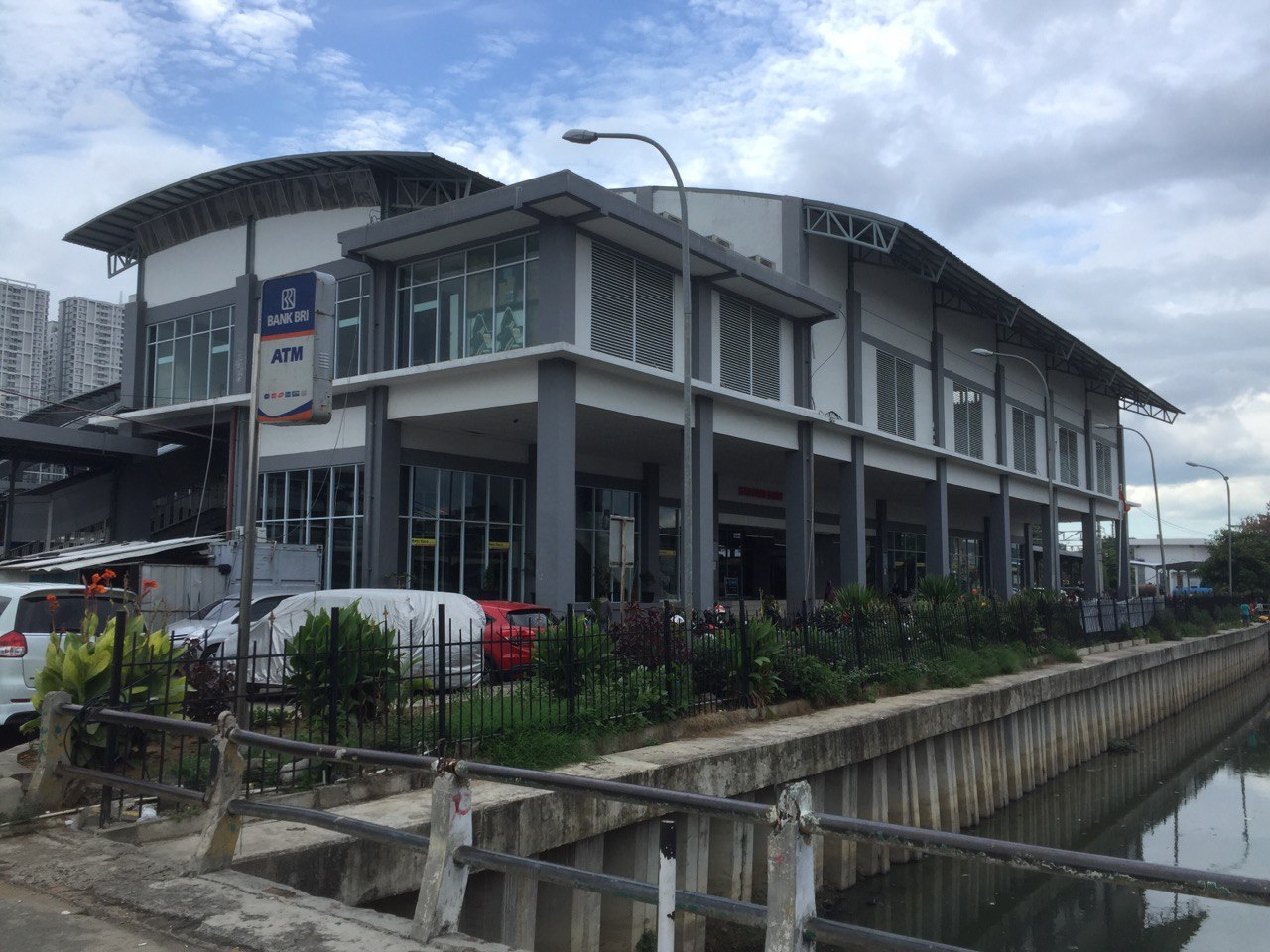
Duri Station

== See also ==
- Greater Jakarta Integrated Mass Transit System
- Transport in Indonesia
- Transport in Jakarta
  - Jakarta MRT
  - Jakarta LRT
  - Jabodebek LRT
  - TransJakarta
- Rail transport in Indonesia
- Commuterline Yogyakarta-Solo
- KAI Commuter
- S-Bahn
