= Cilebut railway station =

Railway station in Indonesia

B24 Cilebut Station Stasiun Cilebut
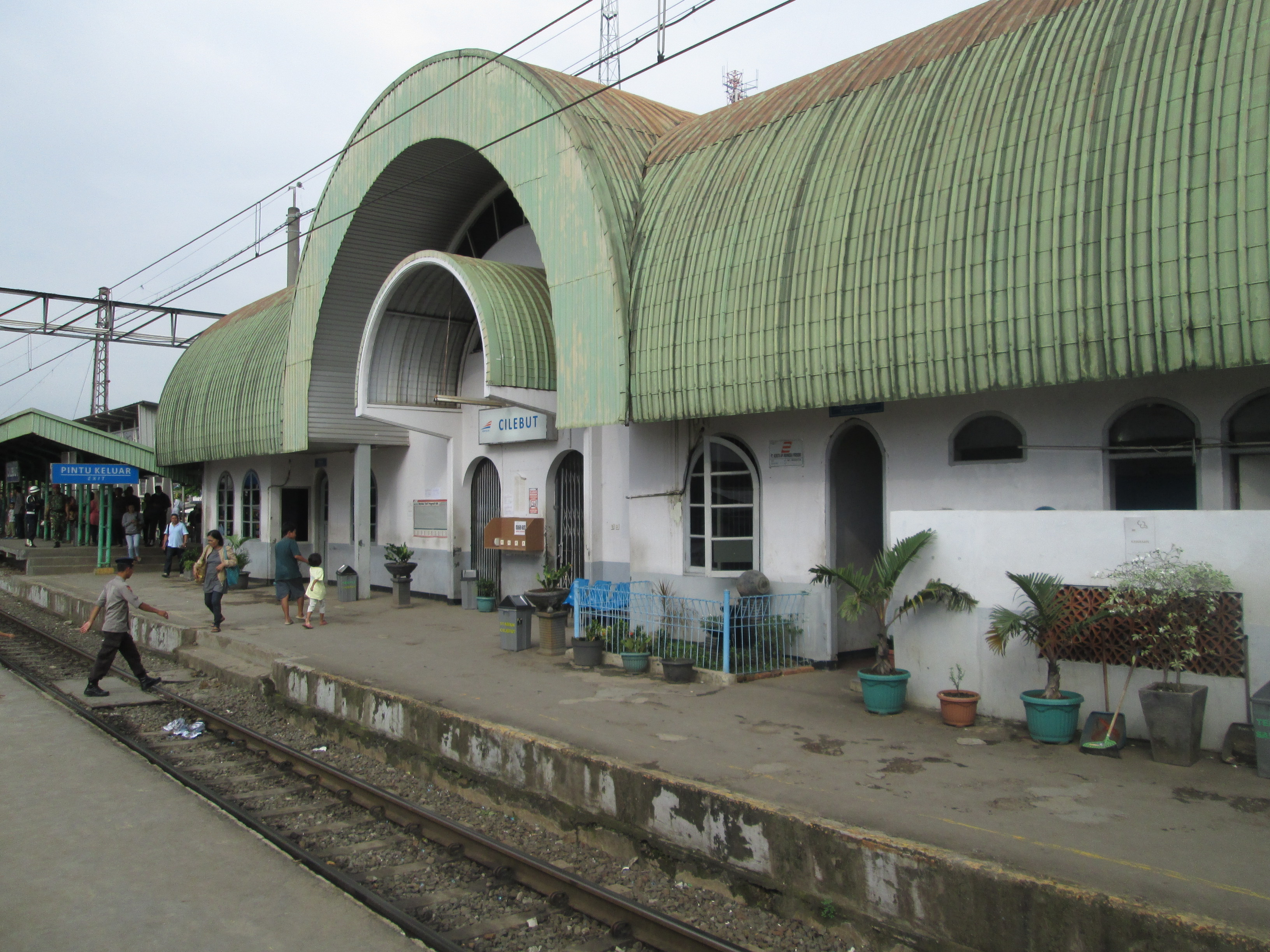
- Cilebut Station

General information
- Location: Jl. Raya Cilebut, East Cilebut, Sukaraja, Bogor Regency; West Java; Indonesia
- Coordinates: 6°31′49.9″S 106°48′2.1″E
- Elevation: +171 m (561 ft)
- Owner: Kereta Api Indonesia
- Operator: KAI Commuter
- Lines: Manggarai–Padalarang railway; Bogor Line
- Platforms: 2 side platforms
- Tracks: 2

Construction
- Structure type: Ground
- Parking: Available
- Accessible: Available

Other information
- Station code: CLT • 0709
- Classification: Class II

History
- Opened: 1873
- Electrified: 6 April 1925

Services
Preceding station		Following station
Bojong Gede towards Jakarta Kota	Commuter Line Bogor Jakarta Kota–Bogor, vice versa.	Bogor Terminus
Location
- Location within Bogor Regency

Cilebut Station (CLT) is a railway station located in East Cilebut, Sukaraja, Bogor Regency, West Java that was opened in 1873. The station is located at an altitude of 171 meters above sea level. This station serves KRL Commuterline trains serving Jabodetabek area.

== Building and layout ==
This station has two railway tracks.

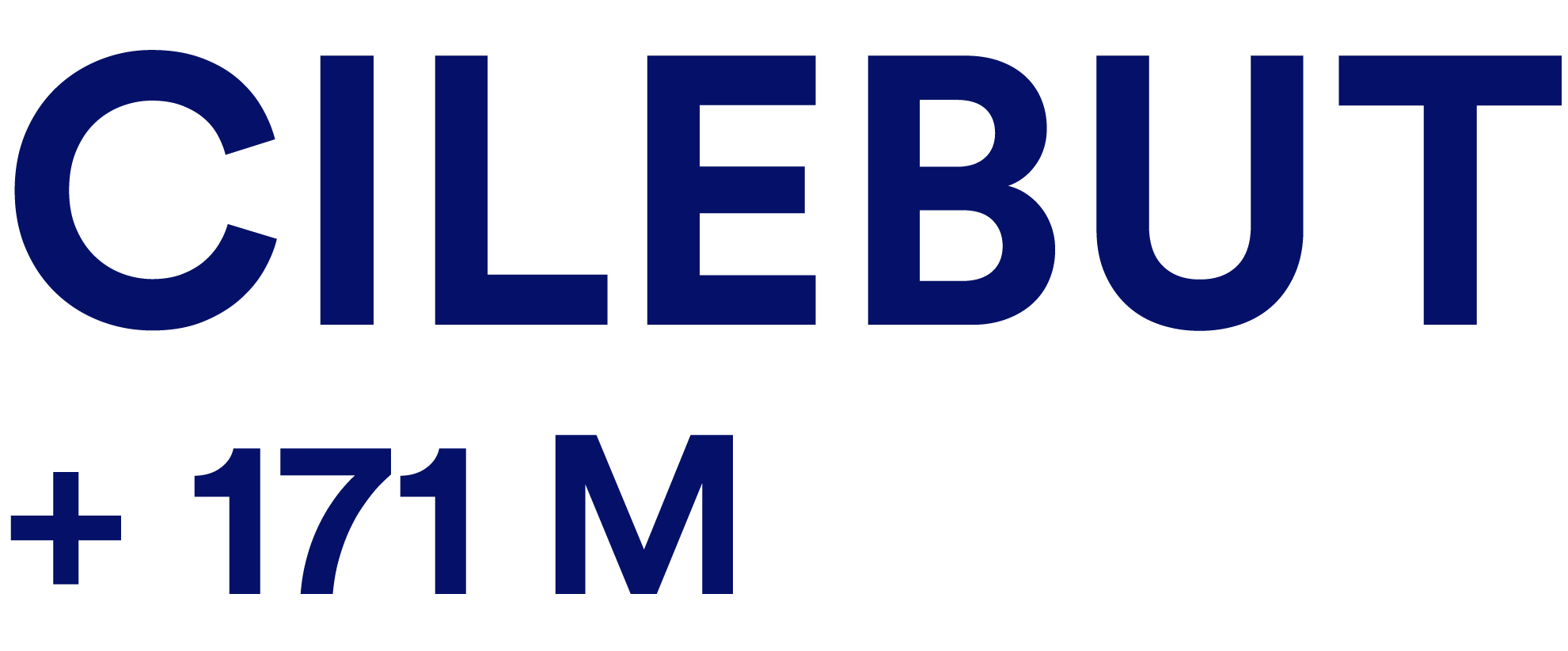
B24
G	Main building	
Platform floor	Side platform, the doors are opened on the right side	
Platform floor	Line 1	← (Bojong Gede) Bogor Line to Jakarta Kota
Platform floor	Island platform	
Platform floor	Line 2	Bogor Line to Bogor (Bogor) →
Platform floor	Side platform, the doors are opened on the right side	
G	Main building	

== Services ==
The following is a list of train services at the Cilebut Station

=== Passenger services ===
- KAI Commuter
  - Bogor Line, to Jakarta Kota and Bogor

== Intermodal support ==
Public transport type	Line	Destination
Angkot	07	Pasar Anyar–Bojong Gede Station
Angkot	22	Bubulak Terminal-Cilebut Station

Preceding station	Kereta Api Indonesia	Following station
Bojong Gede towards Manggarai	Manggarai–Padalarang	Bogor towards Padalarang
