= Jakarta Fashion & Food Festival =

Annual event in Jakarta, Indonesia

Jakarta Fashion & Food Festival JFFF
- Genre: Culinary and fashion festival
- Frequency: Annually
- Location: Jakarta (primarily at Sentra Kelapa Gading area)
- Country: Indonesia
- Inaugurated: 2004
- Previous event: April 5th to May 6th, 2018
- Next event: 07 August to 08 September, 2019
- Website: jfff.info

Jakarta Fashion & Food Festival or JFFF is an annual festival held in Jakarta, Indonesia. The month-long festival is organised by the DKI Jakarta Provincial Government through the DKI Jakarta Tourism and Culture Office in collaboration with PT Summarecon Agung Tbk. The event is supported by the Indonesian Ministry of Tourism and Creative Economy and the Indonesian Ministry of Trade. JFFF is also supported by various parties such as the Martha Tilaar Group, the Indonesian Fashion Entrepreneurs Designer Association (APPMI), the Indonesian Fashion Designers Association (IPMI), Indonesian Cita Weaving (CTI), ESMOD Fashion School, MRA Media Group, Metro TV, Fashion TV, Kompas, and The Jakarta Post. The aim of JFFF is to lift the image, dignity and dignity of the Indonesian people through a culture-based industry.

JFFF takes place every year in May in the Sentra Kelapa Gading area. JFFF's fashion and culinary themes are embodied in the three main series of events,

- Fashion Extravaganza: A series of fashion shows from local designers and brands, as well as the JFFF Awards
- Food festival: hundreds of food stalls/booths that serve traditional cuisine, starting from meatballs and soto (aromatic soup) to local snacks.
- Gading Nite Carnival: Presenting decorated street floats, entertaining street attractions and attractive lighting techniques.
