= Singapore Intercultural School, Indonesia =

SIS Group of Schools

Location
- Jl. Bona Vista Raya Lebak Bulus Jakarta Selatan 12440; Indonesia
- Coordinates: 6.300281635810787°S 106.78486357489172°E

Information
- Type: Private International School Group
- Motto: Towards Greater Heights
- Established: 1997
- Founder: Jaspal Sidhu
- Grades: K-12
- Gender: Coeducational
- Enrollment: 3,500 students at the beginning of the 2021–22 school year
- Language: English
- Campuses: Indonesia (South Jakarta, Kelapa Gading, PIK, Surabaya, Bandung, Medan, Semarang, Palembang, Cilegon); India (Mumbai and Chennai); Myanmar (Yangon); South Korea (Gwangju)
- Campus size: 14
- Colors: Red and white
- Mascot: Lion
- Website: www.sisschools.org

The SIS (Singapore Intercultural School) Group of Schools in Indonesia, is an intercultural school group founded in Jakarta, Indonesia. The SIS Group of Schools cater to students from preschool to junior college based on an international curriculum.

The flagship school, SIS South Jakarta, is located next to Bona Vista Apartments in South Jakarta and has ten sister schools in Indonesia located in Kelapa Gading (Northeast Jakarta and Sedayu City), Pantai Indah Kapuk, Surabaya, Bandung, Medan, Semarang, Palembang, and Cilegon; with two additional schools to be established in Manado and Batam. The group used to have a campus in Kebon Jeruk (West Jakarta) which has since been closed.

The group also has schools established in India (Mumbai and Chennai), Korea (Gwangju) and Myanmar (Yangon).

== History ==
In 1995, members of the Jakarta business community felt the need for a Singapore-style school in Jakarta to cater to expatriate children working in Indonesia. Several initial meetings with Singapore's Ambassador to Indonesia H.E. Edward Lee generated the enthusiasm needed to start the project. This culminated in a meeting in early 1996 with H.E. Deputy Prime Minister of Singapore, Dr. Tony Tan who was also then the Education Minister. The inspiration drawn from that meeting set the wheels in motion for the first SIS pilot school campus.

The team moved quickly to secure the help of Raffles Institution, Singapore's premier school. The expertise of one of Singapore's most respected educational leaders, Mr. Eugene Wijeyhsingha (former principal of Raffles Institution) was utilized to give the school a good foundation. And soon afterwards the Board of Governors of SIS successfully lobbied the release of Mr. Magendiran, also from Raffles Institution, to be the first Principal of the SIS pilot school campus in 1997.

This first pilot school welcomed its first batch of 25 pupils in January 1997. The school was set up with the moral support of Singapore's Ministry of Education and financial support from the International Finance Corporation. With the rising enrolment and also to cater to the international community, the school was moved to a larger premises in January 1999 at Gandaria in South Jakarta. Finally in January 2002, the group's flagship school, SIS South Jakarta (formerly SIS Bona Vista) opened the doors to its new building in the Bona Vista complex in Lebak Bulus, South Jakarta site with enrolment reaching 400 students from many nationalities. The founders later started secondary (secondary 1–4) and Pre-University Classes.

To comply with the new Ministry of Education regulation (Permendikbud Nomor 31 Tahun 2014), which also affected all International Schools in Indonesia – all SIS Group of Schools in Indonesia changed from "Singapore International School" to "Singapore Intercultural School".

== Board of governors ==
SIS Group of Schools board director is led by Alvin Hew, who is based in Singapore and is Group Managing Director of Southgate Ventures Pte Ltd. Alvin has played a major role in advising the trajectory of the school and drive the growth of SIS in Indonesia and other regions. He plays a key role to modernise how the school runs and markets itself by pivoting to a digital approach in marketing as well as in teaching and learning all the while constantly improving Program People & Place. This has led to a strong growth in earnings over the past few years.

SIS Group of Schools are also governed by other non-profit foundations.

== Schools ==
=== SIS South Jakarta, Jakarta ===
==== Academics ====
The primary curriculum emulates that of the curriculum used in Singapore schools. SIS South Jakarta is a certified Cambridge Centre for International Examinations (CIE) offering an international curriculum in the IGCSE. In September 2013, SIS South Jakarta became officially authorised as an IB World School (International Baccalaureate). From 2014, SIS South Jakarta has offered the IB Diploma Programme (IB DP) or an IB Courses program.
