= Mal Artha Gading =

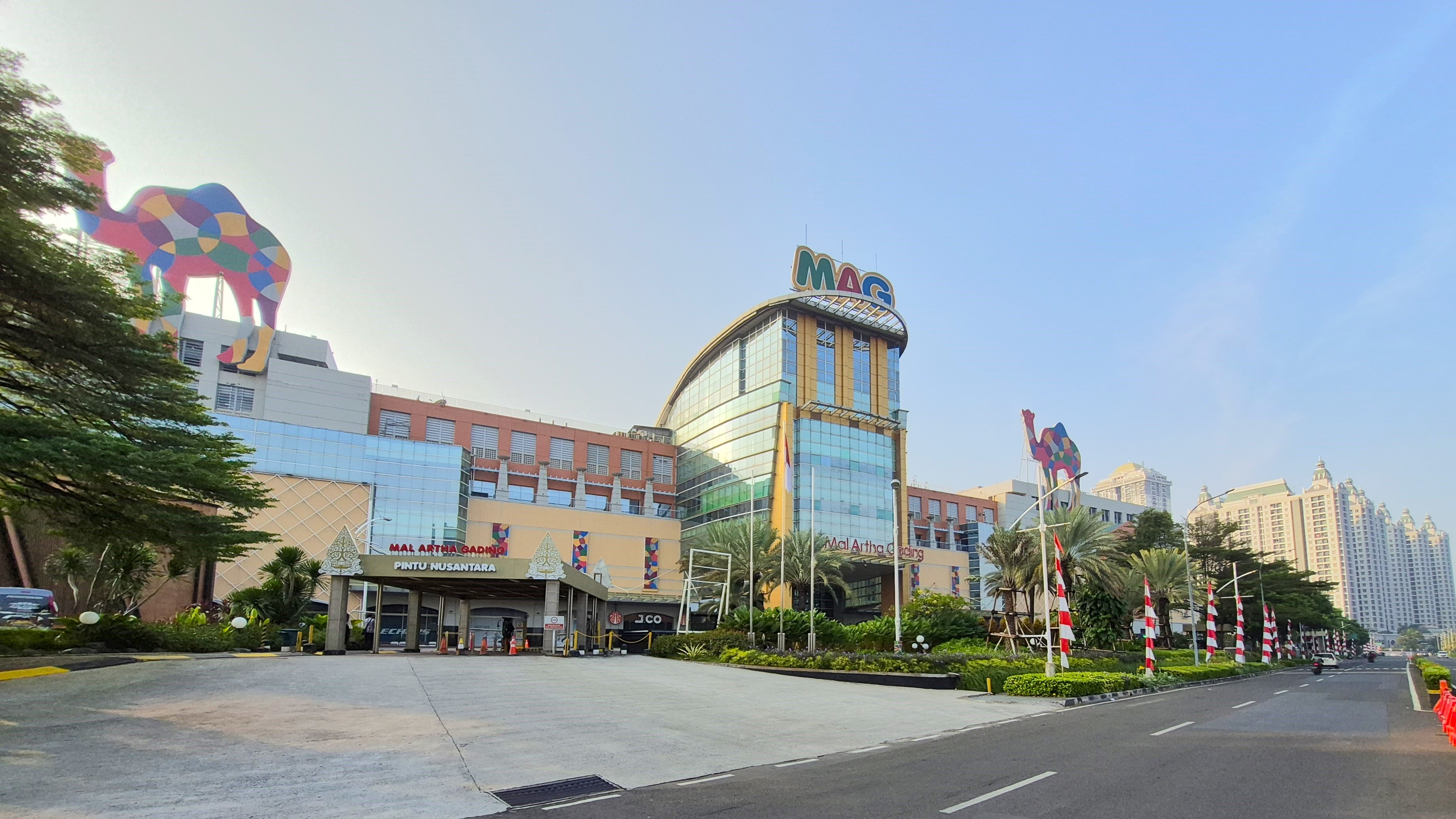
- Location: North Jakarta, Indonesia
- Coordinates: 6.145576°S 106.892239°E
- Manager: PT Sarana Pandu Artha
- Public transit: Sunter Kelapa Gading

Mal Artha Gading is a shopping mall located in Kelapa Gading, North Jakarta, Indonesia. It has an area of 270,000 m^{2} (2,900,000 sq ft). The architecture was adopted from the Silk Road and consists of types from seven wonders of the world. Some major tenants in here are Azko, Cinema XXI, Informa, Diamond supermarket, etc.

== See also ==
- Indonesian architecture
