= Singapore School Kelapa Gading =

Singapore School, Kelapa Gading
- Member of the SIS Group of Schools

Location
- Jl. Pegangsaan Dua No. 83; 6.149657°S 106.915849°E; Kelapa Gading; Jakarta Utara, DKI Jakarta, 14250; Indonesia

Information
- School type: Private K-12 School
- Motto: Towards Greater Heights
- Established: 2002
- Authority: Ministry of Education and Culture (Indonesia), IB World School, Cambridge International School
- Grades: Early Childhood (N1) through to Junior College (JC2 / Grade 12)
- Gender: Coeducational
- Age range: 2 to 18 years
- Enrollment: ~850 students
- Colours: Purple (SIS-KG), Red and White (SIS United)
- Mascot: Lion
- Website: http://www.sis-kg.org

Singapore School, Kelapa Gading (SIS-KG), sometimes referred to as SIS Kelapa Gading, is a private, early childhood to junior college school in North Jakarta, Indonesia. It is a member of the SIS Group of Schools. It is a Cambridge International School and an IB World School as well as being fully registered with the Ministry of Education and Culture (Indonesia) for the Indonesian national examinations.

== History ==
Starting in a foster house as a preschool in 2002, Singapore School Kelapa Gading grew sufficiently to move to its current large premises on Jakarta Garden City, East Jakarta, where it became a Cambridge International Centre and then becoming authorised to offer what was then the Cambridge International Primary Program. A four-storey building was added to cater for growth; in 2013, the new swimming pool (once used as a venue for a local swimming competition) and Futsal court was completed.

Singapore School Kelapa Gading became a fully authorised IB World school in April 2014 and has provided the IB Diploma Programme for its Junior College students since July 2014. As part of this development, a large Junior College Library and Media Centre were added, providing independent space and a significant collection of physical and online resources for the expanding program.

In September, 2014, Singapore School Kelapa Gading changed its name to SIS Kelapa Gading although located at JGC east Jakarta

== Facilities ==
The campus is on the corner of Jl. Pegangsaan Dua and Jl. Hibrida Raya in Kelapa Gading, close to Mal Kelapa Gading. The front building houses administration, meeting areas, a canteen, a library and a multi-purpose hall. The 4-storey building contains classrooms, science labs, IT labs, music and arts rooms and further meeting areas, and is monitored by CCTV.

The preschool has its own playroom, playground, and small pool. The most recent addition is a Junior College Library and Media Centre on the fourth floor, which serves as the hub of the IB Diploma Programme. The football field is used during football season as one of the venues for the Jakarta Schools Football League and it lies adjacent to a swimming pool and additional futsal court.

== Sporting achievements ==
SIS Kelapa Gading is the current record holder for the overall champion school in the annual SIS Olympics, a competition including all eight branches of SIS across Indonesia. As of the 2017/18 academic year, SIS-KG had won each of the last nine SIS Olympics.

Competition includes track and field, swimming, tennis, table tennis, badminton, volleyball, basketball and futsal. The futsal competition involving teams from all age groups is called the Governors Cup. SIS-KG has won this cup for the most recent six years.

SIS-KG enters its own teams in the Greenfield's Cup of the Jakarta Schools Football League each year (boys and girls teams and contributes the majority of the players to a SIS United team comprising players from among the four SIS schools in Jakarta.

SIS-KG has girls volleyball and football teams.
