= Gedung Joang '45 =

Museum in Jakarta, Indonesia

Coordinates: 6°11′10″S 106°50′12″E

Gedung Joang '45 is a historical museum in Jakarta, which tells the history of the Indonesian struggle for independence from Dutch colonial rule and the formation of the state of Indonesia.

== Museum ==
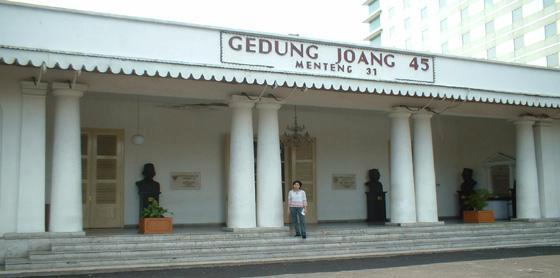
Entrance of Gedung Joang '45

The museum is located in the former building of Hotel Schomper, at Jalan Menteng Raya 31. After renovation, the museum was inaugurated in 1974 by President Suharto. It is a national monument and guided tours of the museum are mostly given by former combatants. In many showcases, history is depicted through scale models and the many period paintings and photographs form an important source of documentation. A recording of the proclamation of Indonesian Independence by Sukarno on 17 August 1945 can be heard here, as well as Sukarno's speech during the large anti-colonialist meeting on Ikada Square on 19 September 1945. The museum attracts many visitors, including school classes. The museum also houses a library with historical reference works.

The Jakarta Tourism and Culture Office manages the museum.

== Hotel Schomper ==
The building originally housed the renowned Hotel Schomper, which was managed between 1920 and 1938 by its owner L.C. Schomper and his wife. After they and their newborn son Pans Schomper had moved to Bandung and established a second Hotel Schomper there, the hotel in Batavia was put under new management. In 1942, however, it was confiscated by the Japanese and occupied by a propaganda office, the Ganseikanbu Sendenbu. Thereafter, it was known as Gedung Menteng 31 and became the place where young nationalists such as Sukarni, Chairul Saleh, A.M. Hanafi and Adam Malik received their political education. As the so-called Pemuda Menteng 31, they would be responsible for the Rengasdengklok Incident; the kidnappings of Sukarno, Fatmawati, and Mohammad Hatta from their homes on the day before the declaration of independence. During the war against the Dutch, the building was also briefly occupied by the Royal Netherlands Navy.
