= Shopping mall =

Large indoor shopping center

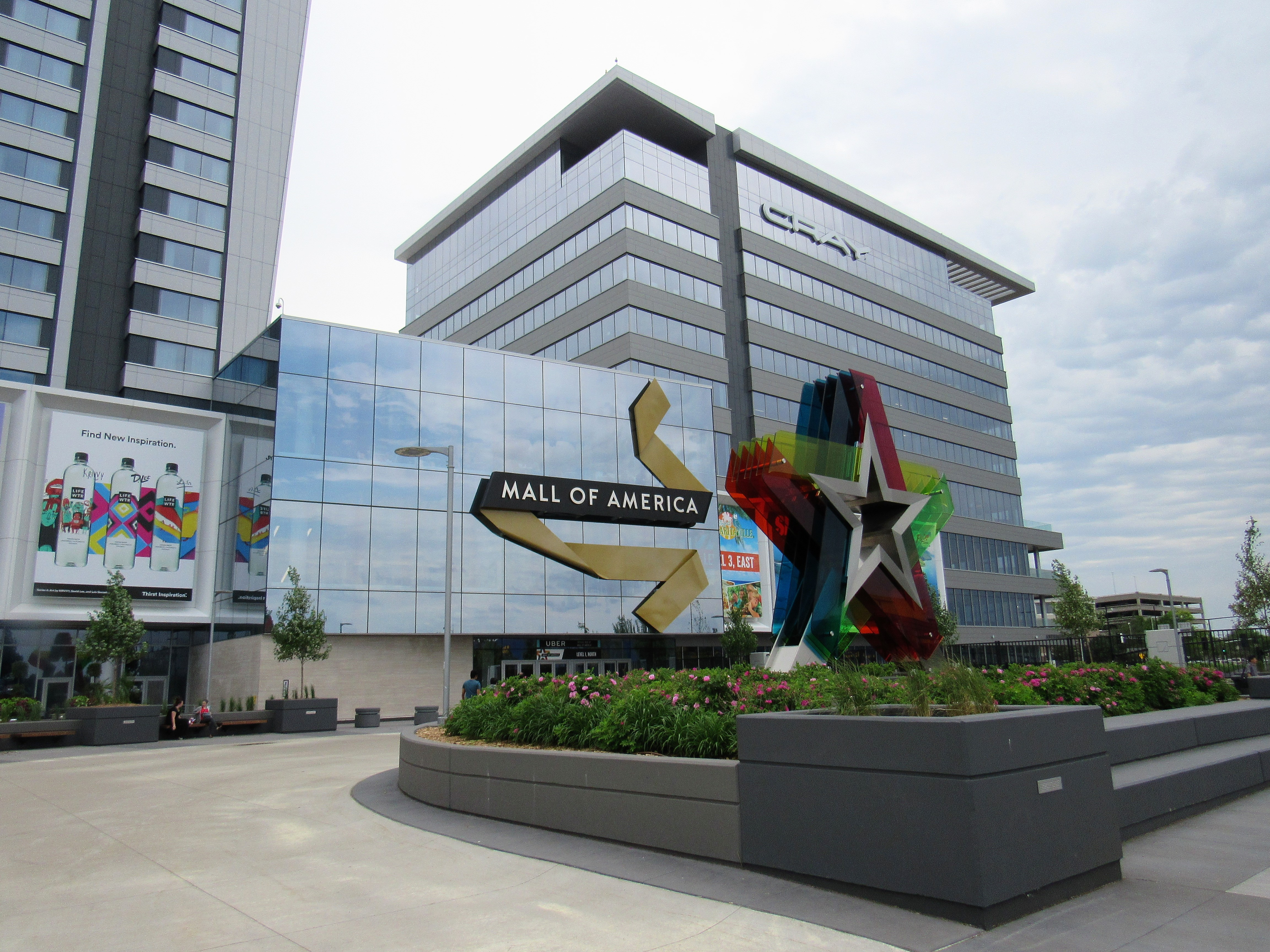
The Mall of America in Bloomington, Minnesota, the largest mall in the United States

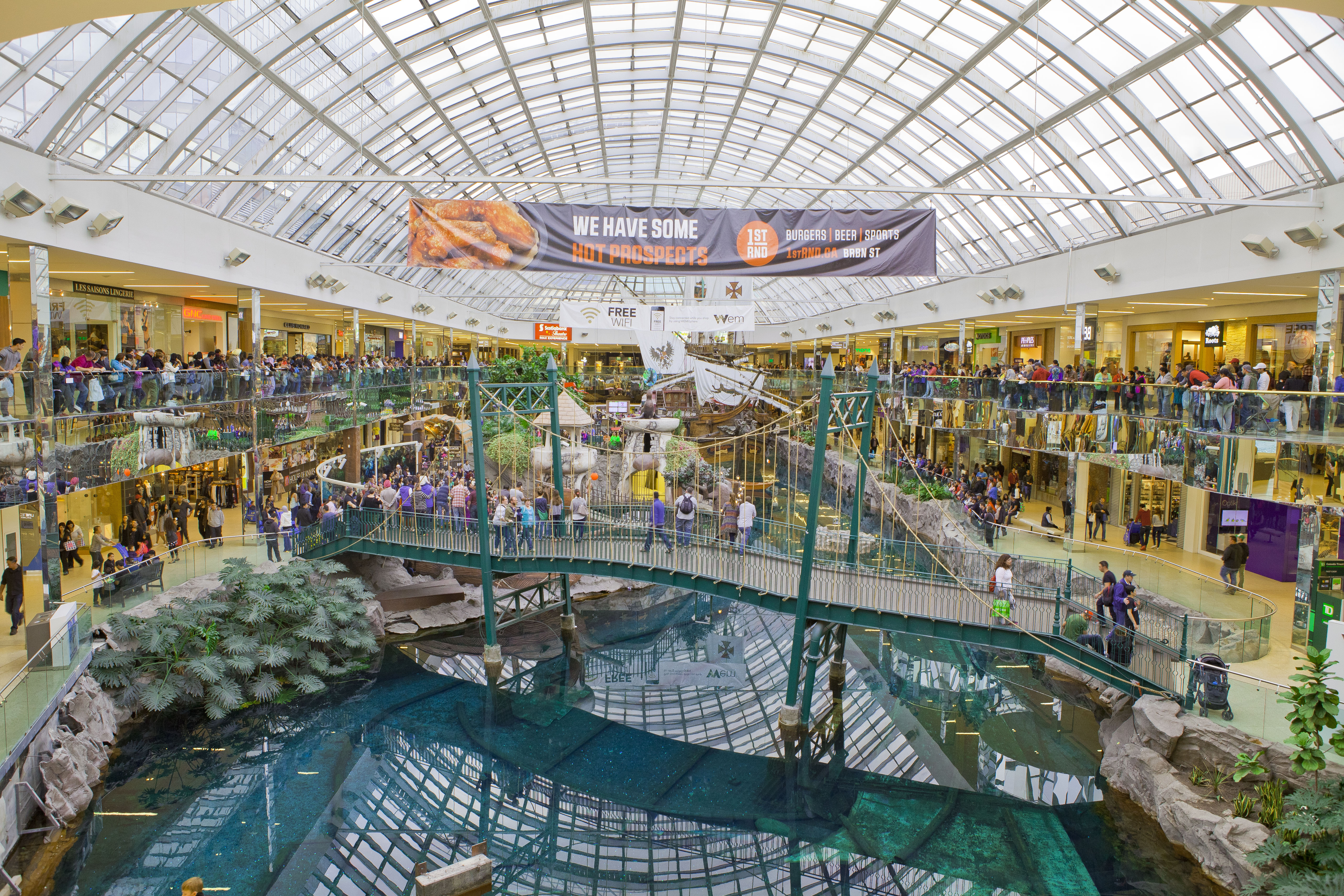
The West Edmonton Mall in Edmonton, Alberta, the largest mall in Canada

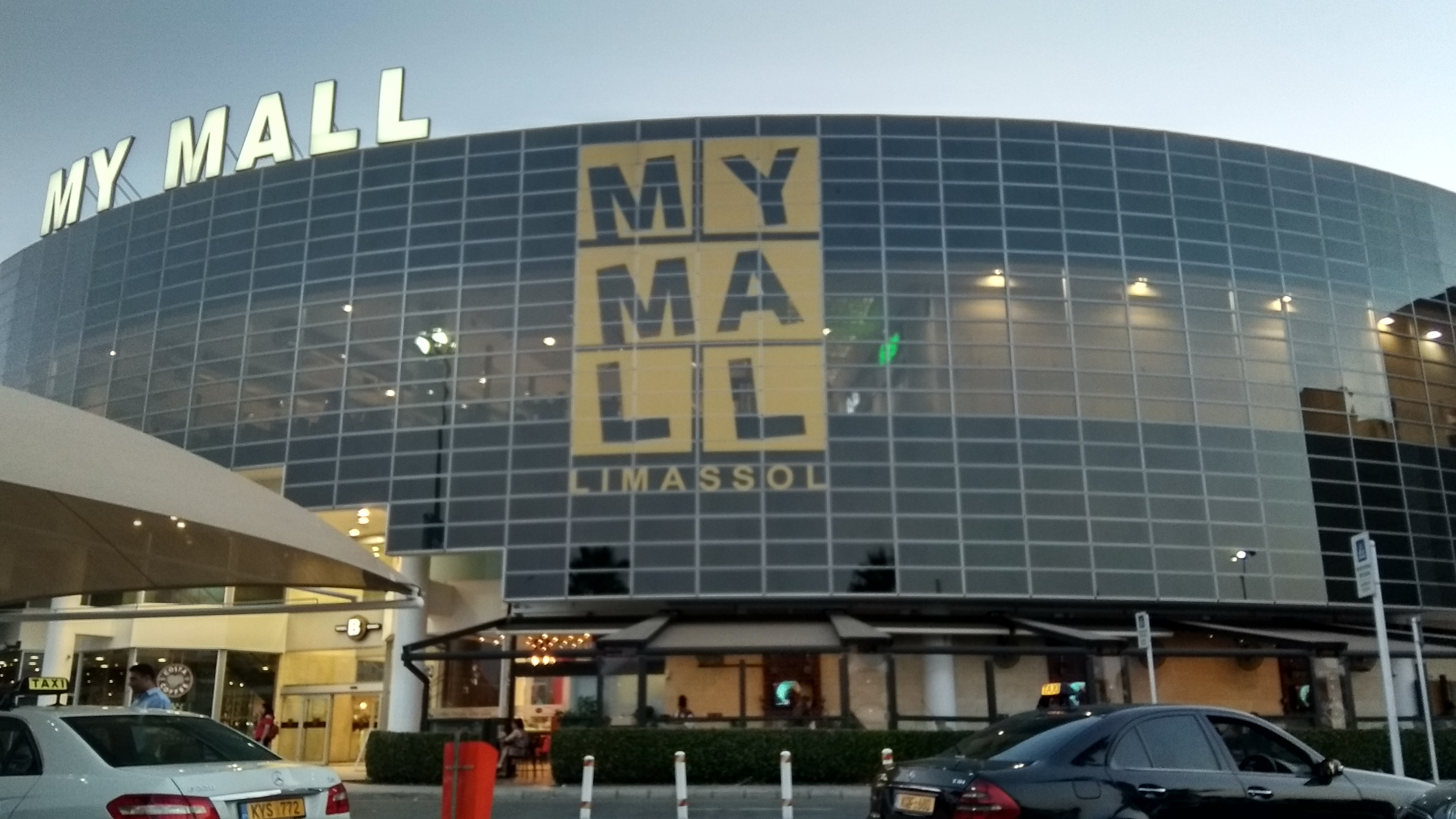
My Mall Limassol in Cyprus

SM Seaside City, the second largest mall in Cebu, Philippines

A shopping mall (or simply mall) is a large indoor shopping center, usually anchored by department stores. The term mall originally meant a pedestrian promenade with shops along it, but in the late 1960s, it began to be used as a generic term for the large enclosed shopping centers that were becoming increasingly commonplace. In the United Kingdom and other countries, shopping malls may be called shopping centres.

In recent decades, malls have declined considerably in the United States and Canada, partly due to the retail apocalypse, particularly in subprime locations, and some have closed and become so-called dead malls. Successful examples of de-malling have seen such changes as added entertainment and experiential features, added big-box stores as anchors, or converted to other specialized shopping center formats such as power centers, lifestyle centers, factory outlet centers, and festival marketplaces. In Canada, shopping centres have frequently been replaced with mixed-use high-rise communities. In many African, Asian, European and Latin American countries, shopping malls continue to grow and thrive.

== Terminology ==
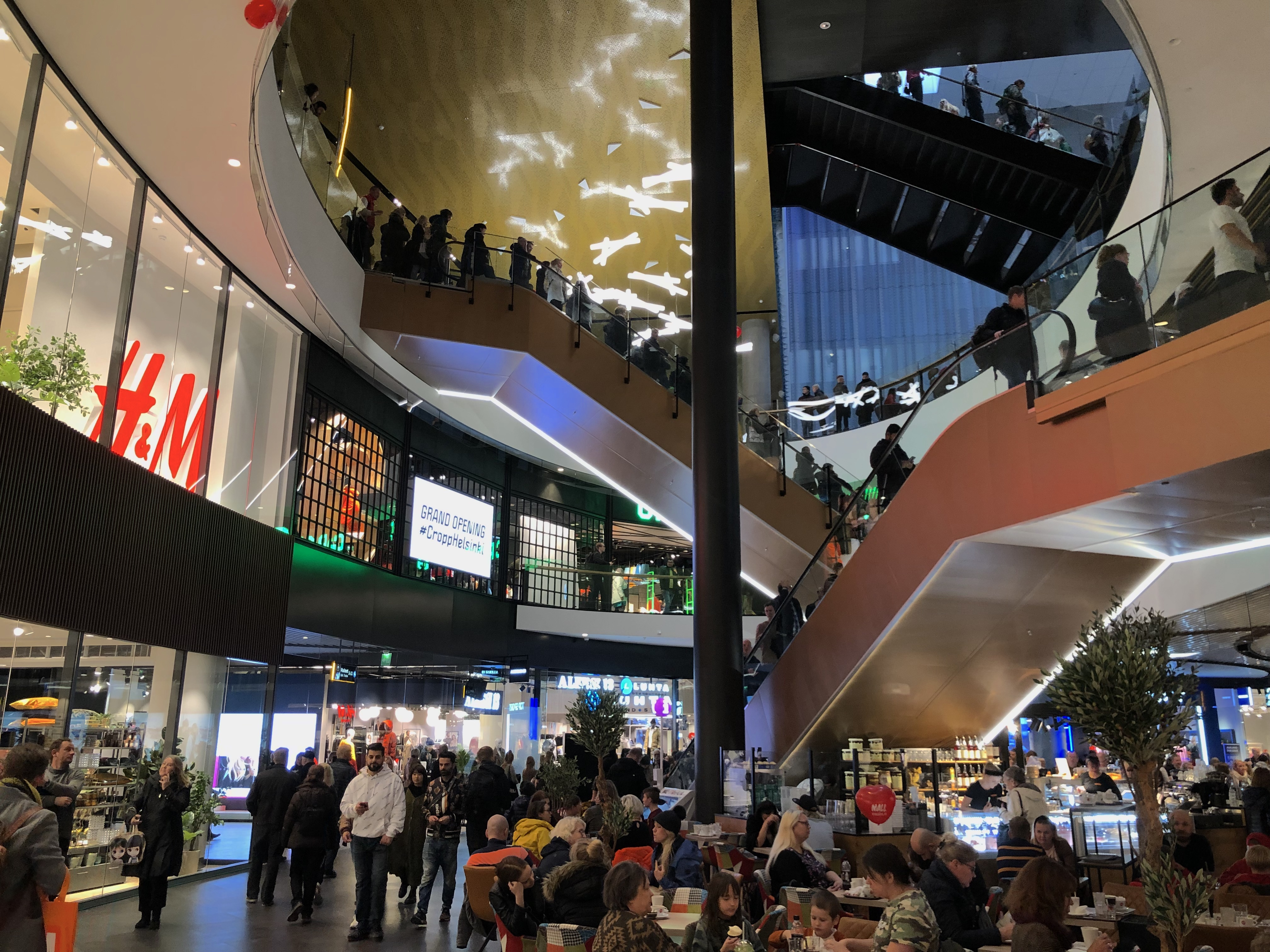
The interior structure of Mall of Tripla in Helsinki, Finland

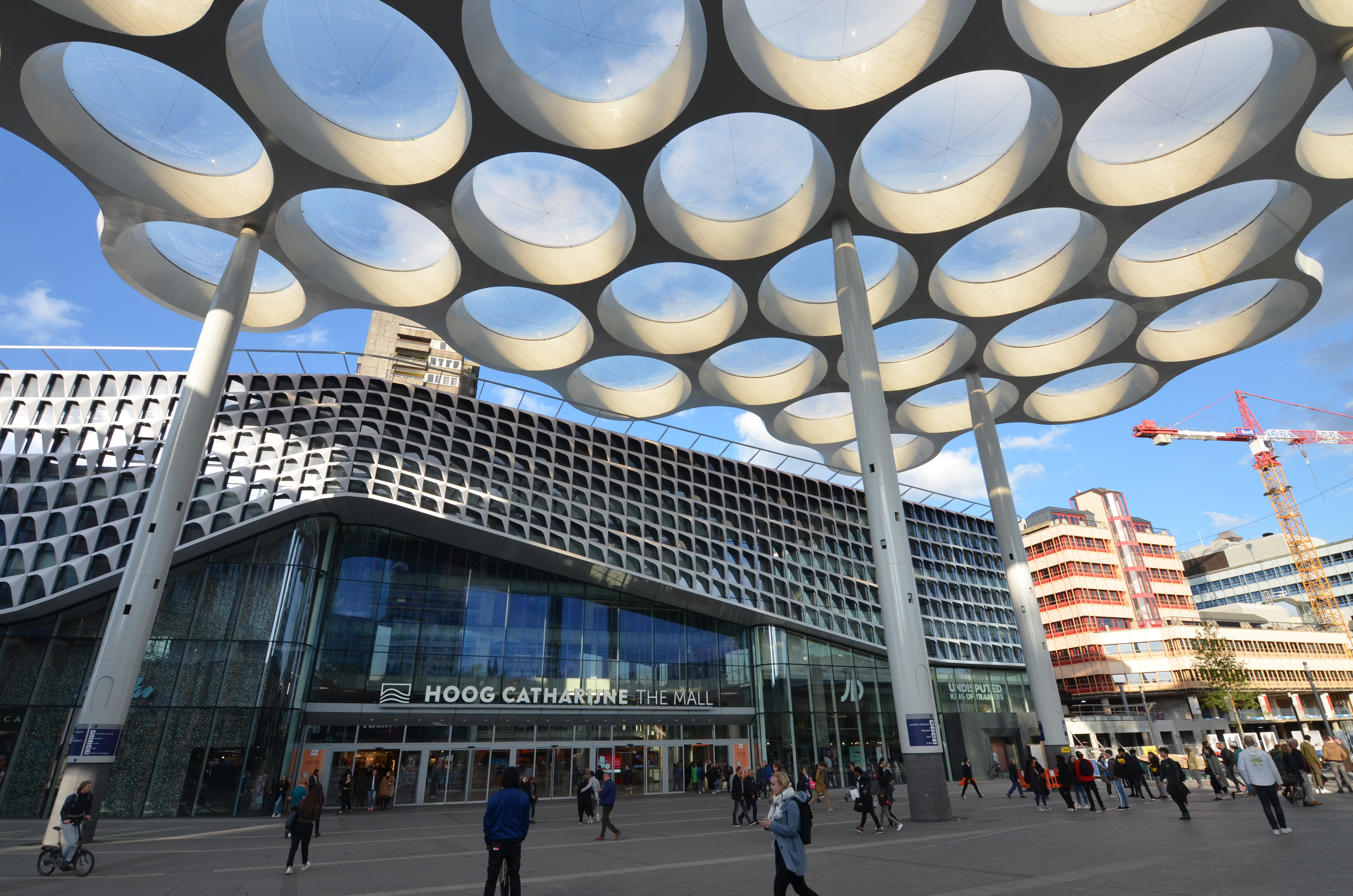
Hoog Catharijne in Utrecht, Netherlands

In the United States, Persian Gulf countries, and India, the term shopping mall is usually applied to enclosed retail structures (and is generally abbreviated to simply mall), while shopping center usually refers to open-air retail complexes; both types of facilities usually have large parking lots, face major traffic arterials, and have few pedestrian connections to surrounding neighborhoods. Outside of North America, the terms shopping precinct and shopping arcade are also used.

In the UK, such complexes are considered shopping locations; however, shopping centre covers many more sizes and types of centers than the North American mall. Other countries follow UK usage. In Canadian English, and often in Australia and New Zealand, the term mall may be used informally but shopping centre or merely centre will feature in the name of the complex (such as Toronto Eaton Centre). The term mall is less commonly a part of the name of the complex.

== Types ==
The International Council of Shopping Centers, based in New York City, classifies two types of shopping centers as malls: regional malls and super regional malls. A regional mall, per the International Council of Shopping Centers, is a shopping mall with 400,000 sq ft (37,000 m^{2}) to 800,000 sq ft (74,000 m^{2}) gross leasable area with at least two anchor stores. A super-regional mall, per the International Council of Shopping Centers, is a shopping mall with over 800,000 sq ft (74,000 m^{2}) of gross leasable area, three or more anchors, mass merchant, more variety, fashion apparel, and serves as the dominant shopping venue for the region (25 miles or 40 km) in which it is located. Not classified as traditional malls are smaller formats such as strip malls and neighborhood shopping centers, and specialized formats such as power centers, festival marketplaces, and outlet centers.

== History ==
=== Forerunners to the shopping mall ===
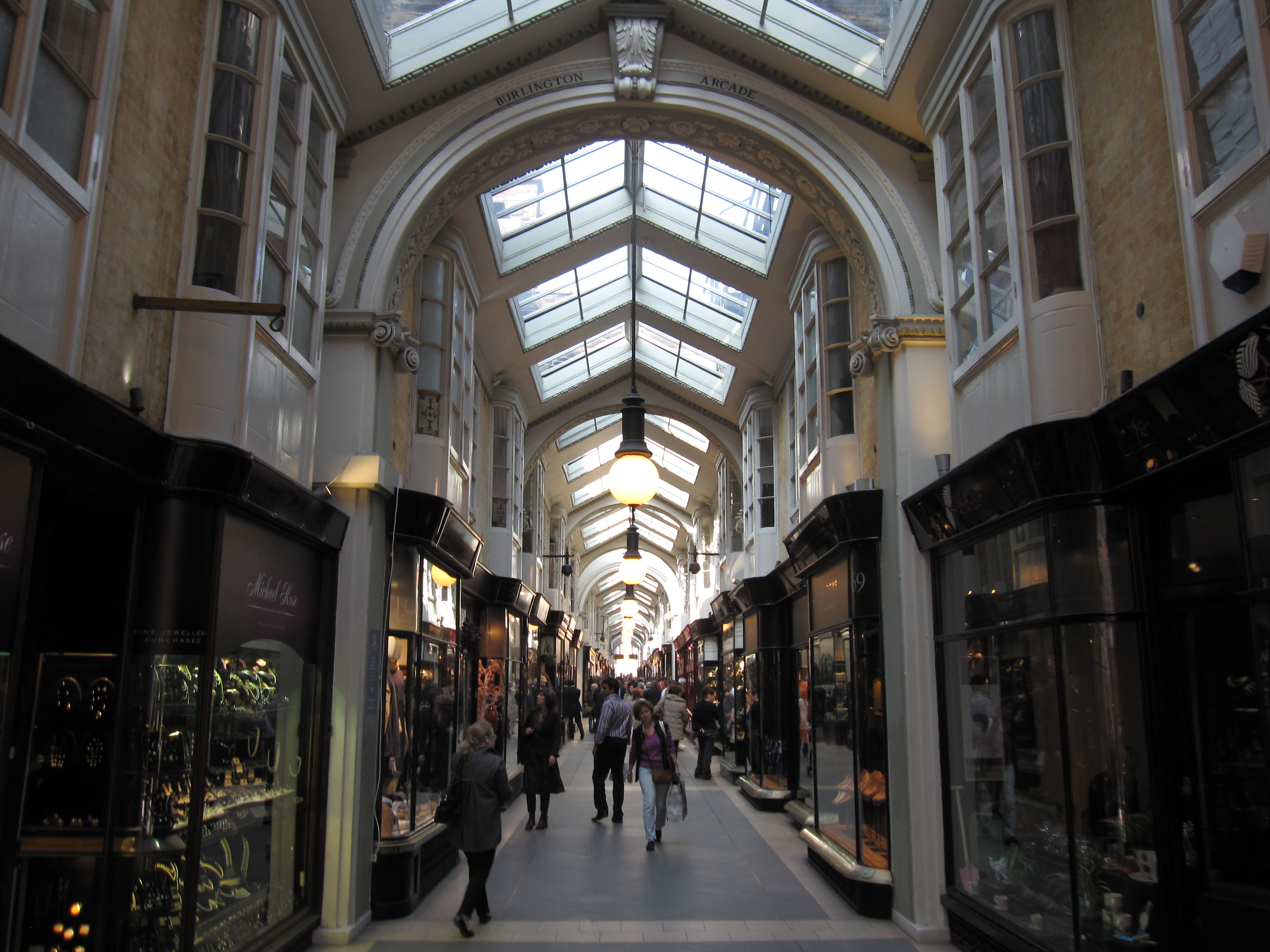
The Burlington Arcade in London, with shop fronts inside (pictured), opened in 1819

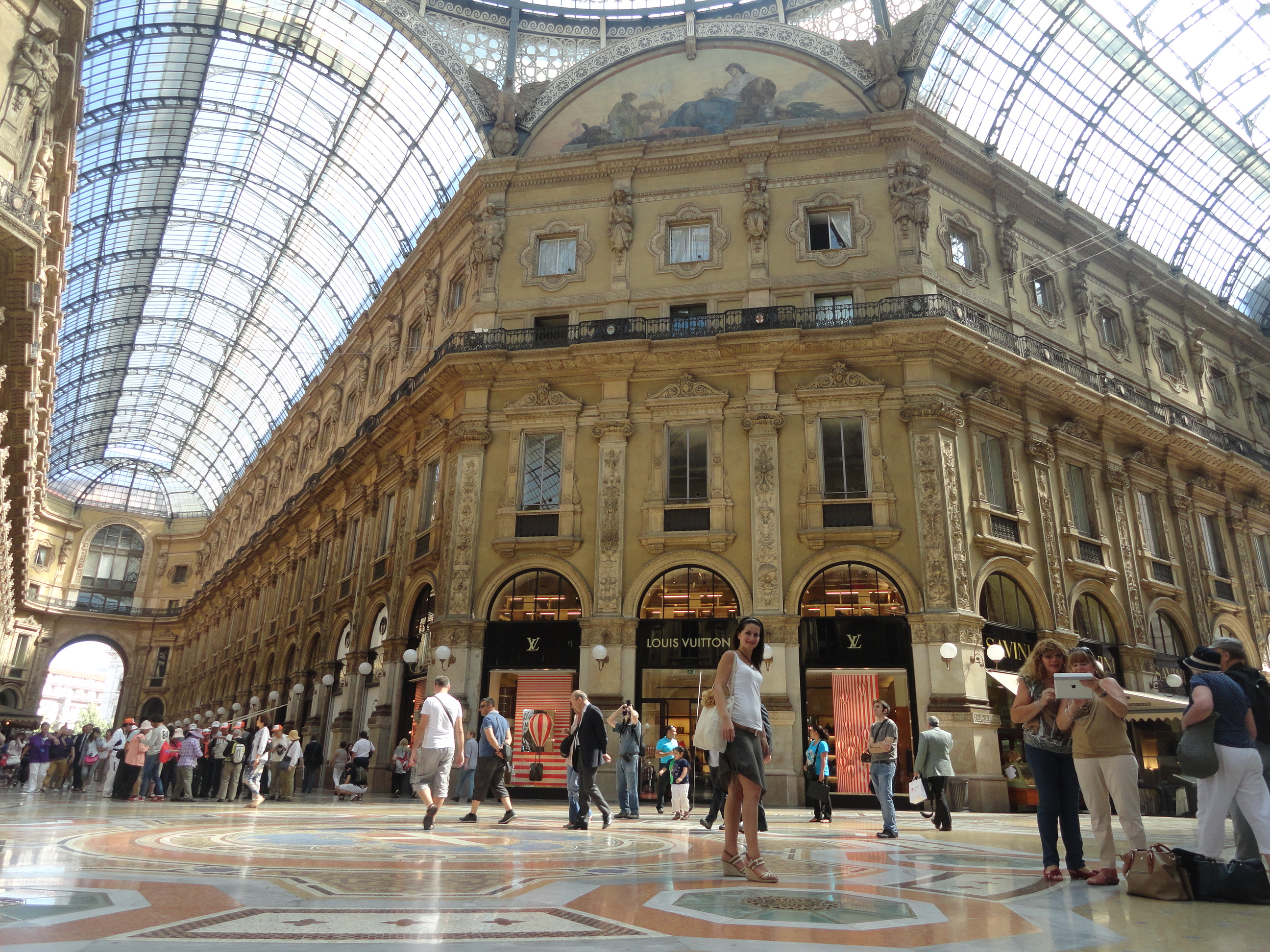
The Galleria Vittorio Emanuele II interior in Milan, which opened in 1877

Shopping centers in general may have their origins in public markets and, in the Middle East, covered bazaars.

In 1798, the first covered shopping passage was built in Paris, the Passage du Caire. In London, the Royal Opera Arcade opened in 1816, and the more famous Burlington Arcade opened in 1819. Western European cities in particular built many arcade-style shopping centers. The Arcade in Providence, Rhode Island, built in 1828, claims to be the first shopping arcade in the United States. The Galleria Vittorio Emanuele II in Milan, which opened in 1877, was larger than its predecessors, and inspired the use of the term "galleria" for many other shopping arcades and malls.

In the mid-20th century, with the rise of the suburb and automobile culture in the United States, a new style of shopping center was created away from downtowns. Early shopping centers designed for the automobile include Market Square, in Lake Forest, Illinois (1916), and Country Club Plaza, in Kansas City, Missouri (1924).

The suburban shopping center concept evolved further in the United States after World War II, with larger open-air shopping centers anchored by major department stores, such as the 550,000-square-foot (51,000 m^{2}) Broadway-Crenshaw Center in Los Angeles, built in 1947 and anchored by a five-story Broadway and a May Company California.

=== Downtown pedestrian malls and use of term mall ===
In the late 1950s and into the 1960s, the term "shopping mall" was first used, but in the original sense of the word "mall", meaning a pedestrian promenade in the U.S., or in U.K. usage, a "shopping precinct". Early downtown pedestrianized malls included the Kalamazoo Mall (the first, in 1959), "Shoppers' See-Way" in Toledo, Lincoln Road Mall in Miami Beach, and the Santa Monica Mall (1965).

Although Bergen Mall opened in 1957 using the name "mall", inspiring other suburban shopping centers to rebrand themselves as malls, these types of properties were still referred to as "shopping centers" until the late 1960s.

=== Enclosed malls ===
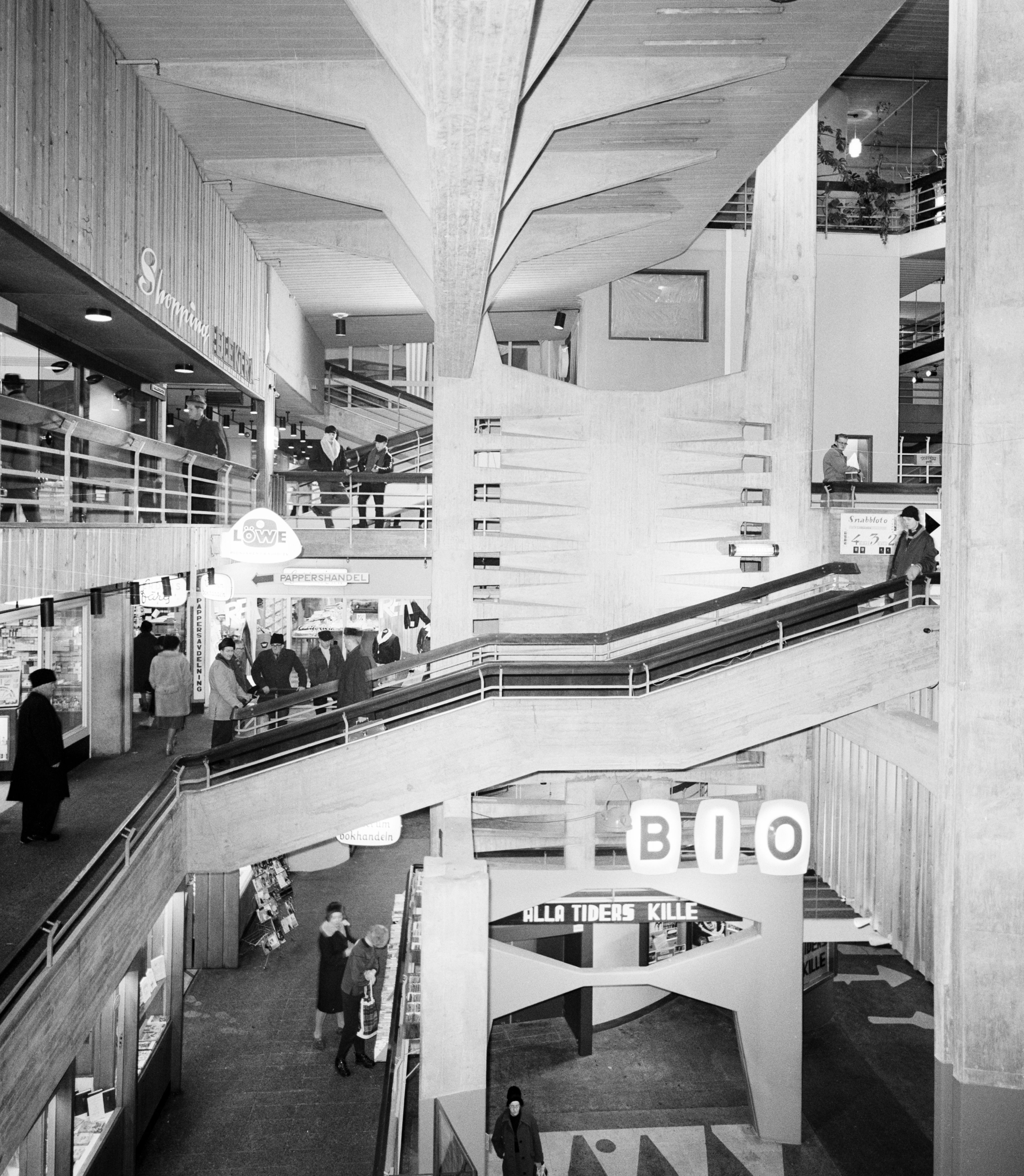
The original interior of Shopping, built in 1955 and one of the first enclosed malls in the world, in Luleå, Sweden

The enclosed shopping center, which would eventually be known as the shopping mall, did not appear in mainstream until the mid-1950s. One of the earliest examples was the Valley Fair Shopping Center in Appleton, Wisconsin, which opened on 10 March 1955. Valley Fair featured a number of modern features, including central heating and cooling, a large outdoor parking area, semi-detached anchor stores, and restaurants. Later that year, the world's first fully enclosed shopping mall was opened in Luleå, in northern Sweden (architect: Ralph Erskine) and was named Shopping; the region now claims the highest shopping center density in Europe.

The idea of a regionally sized, fully enclosed shopping complex was pioneered in 1956 by the Austrian-born architect and American immigrant Victor Gruen. This new generation of regional-size shopping centers began with the Gruen-designed Southdale Center, which opened in the Twin Cities suburb of Edina, Minnesota, United States, in October 1956. For pioneering the soon-to-be enormously popular mall concept in this form, Gruen has been called the "most influential architect of the twentieth century" by Canadian writer Malcolm Gladwell.

The first retail complex to be promoted as a "mall" was Paramus, New Jersey's Bergen Mall, which opened with an open-air format on 14 November 1957, and was later enclosed in 1973. Aside from Southdale Center, significant early enclosed shopping malls were Harundale Mall (1958) in Glen Burnie, Maryland, Big Town Mall (1959) in Mesquite, Texas, Chris-Town Mall (1961) in Phoenix, Arizona, and Randhurst Center (1962) in Mount Prospect, Illinois.

Other early malls moved retailing away from the dense, commercial downtowns into the largely residential suburbs. This formula (enclosed space with stores attached, away from downtown, and accessible only by automobile) became a popular way to build retail across the world. Gruen himself came to abhor this effect of his new design; he decried the creation of enormous "land wasting seas of parking" and the spread of suburban sprawl.

Even though malls mostly appeared in suburban areas in the U.S., some U.S. cities facilitated the construction of enclosed malls downtown as an effort to revive city centers and allow them to compete effectively with suburban malls. Examples included Main Place Mall in Buffalo (1969) and The Gallery (1977, now Fashion District Philadelphia) in Philadelphia. Other cities created open-air pedestrian malls.

In the United States, developers such as A. Alfred Taubman of Taubman Centers extended the concept further in 1980, with terrazzo tiles at the Mall at Short Hills in New Jersey, indoor fountains, and two levels, allowing a shopper to make a circuit of all the stores. Taubman believed carpeting increased friction, slowing down customers, so it was removed. Fading daylight through glass panels was supplemented by gradually increased electric lighting, making it seem like the afternoon was lasting longer, which encouraged shoppers to linger.

=== Decline of shopping malls in the United States ===
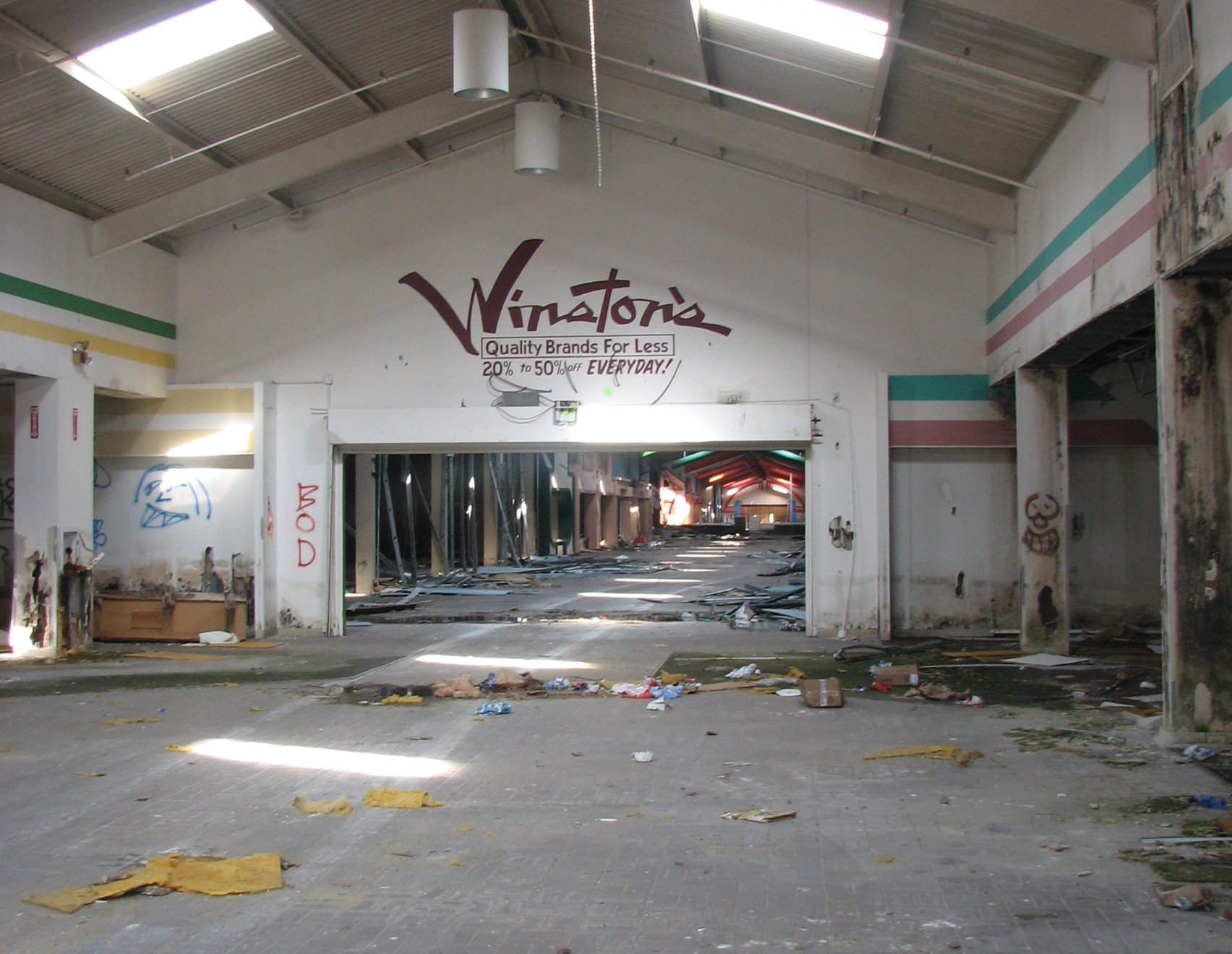
Belz Factory Outlet Mall, an abandoned shopping mall in Allen, Texas, United States

In the United States, in the mid-1990s, malls were still being constructed at a rate of 140 a year. But in 2001, a PricewaterhouseCoopers study found that underperforming and vacant malls, known as "greyfield" and "dead mall" estates, were an emerging problem. In 2007, a year before the Great Recession, no new malls were built in America, for the first time in 50 years. City Creek Center Mall in Salt Lake City, which opened in March 2012, was the first to be built since the recession.

Malls began to lose consumers to open-air power centers and lifestyle centers during the 1990s, as consumers preferred to park right in front of and walk directly into big-box stores with lower prices and without the overhead of traditional malls (i.e., long enclosed corridors).

Another issue was that the growth-crazed American commercial real estate industry had simply built too many nice places to shop—far more than could be reasonably justified by the actual growth of the American population, retail sales, or any other economic indicator. The number of American shopping centers exploded from 4,500 in 1960 to 70,000 by 1986 to just under 108,000 by 2010.

Thus, the number of dead malls increased significantly in the early 21st century. The economic health of malls across the United States has been in decline, as revealed by high vacancy rates. From 2006 to 2010, the percentage of malls that are considered to be "dying" by real estate experts (have a vacancy rate of at least 40%), unhealthy (20–40%), or in trouble (10–20%) all increased greatly, and these high vacancy rates only partially decreased from 2010 to 2014. In 2014, nearly 3% of all malls in the United States were considered to be "dying" (40% or higher vacancy rates), and nearly one-fifth of all malls had vacancy rates considered "troubling" (10% or higher). Some real estate experts say the "fundamental problem" is a glut of malls in many parts of the country, creating a market that is "extremely over-retailed". By the time shopping mall operator Unibail-Rodamco-Westfield decided to exit the American market in 2022, the United States had an average of 24.5 square feet of retail space per capita (in contrast to 4.5 square feet per capita in Europe).

In 2019, The Shops & Restaurants at Hudson Yards opened as an upscale mall in New York City with "a 'Fifth Avenue' mix of shops", such as H&M, Zara, and Sephora below them. This is one of the first two malls built recently, along with American Dream in which both opened in 2019 since City Creek Center.

Online shopping has also emerged as a major competitor to shopping malls. In the United States, online shopping has accounted for an increasing share of total retail sales. In 2013, roughly 200 out of 1,300 malls across the United States were going out of business. To combat this trend, developers have converted malls into other uses, including attractions such as parks, movie theaters, gyms, and even fishing lakes. In the United States, the 600,000 square foot Highland Mall will be a campus for Austin Community College. In France, the So Ouest mall, outside of Paris, was designed to resemble elegant, Louis XV-style apartments and includes 17,000 square metres (180,000 sq ft) of green space. The Australian mall company Westfield launched an online mall (and later a mobile app) with 150 stores, 3,000 brands, and over 1 million products.

The COVID-19 pandemic also significantly impacted the retail industry. Government regulations temporarily closed malls, increased entrance controls, and imposed strict public sanitation requirements.

== Design ==
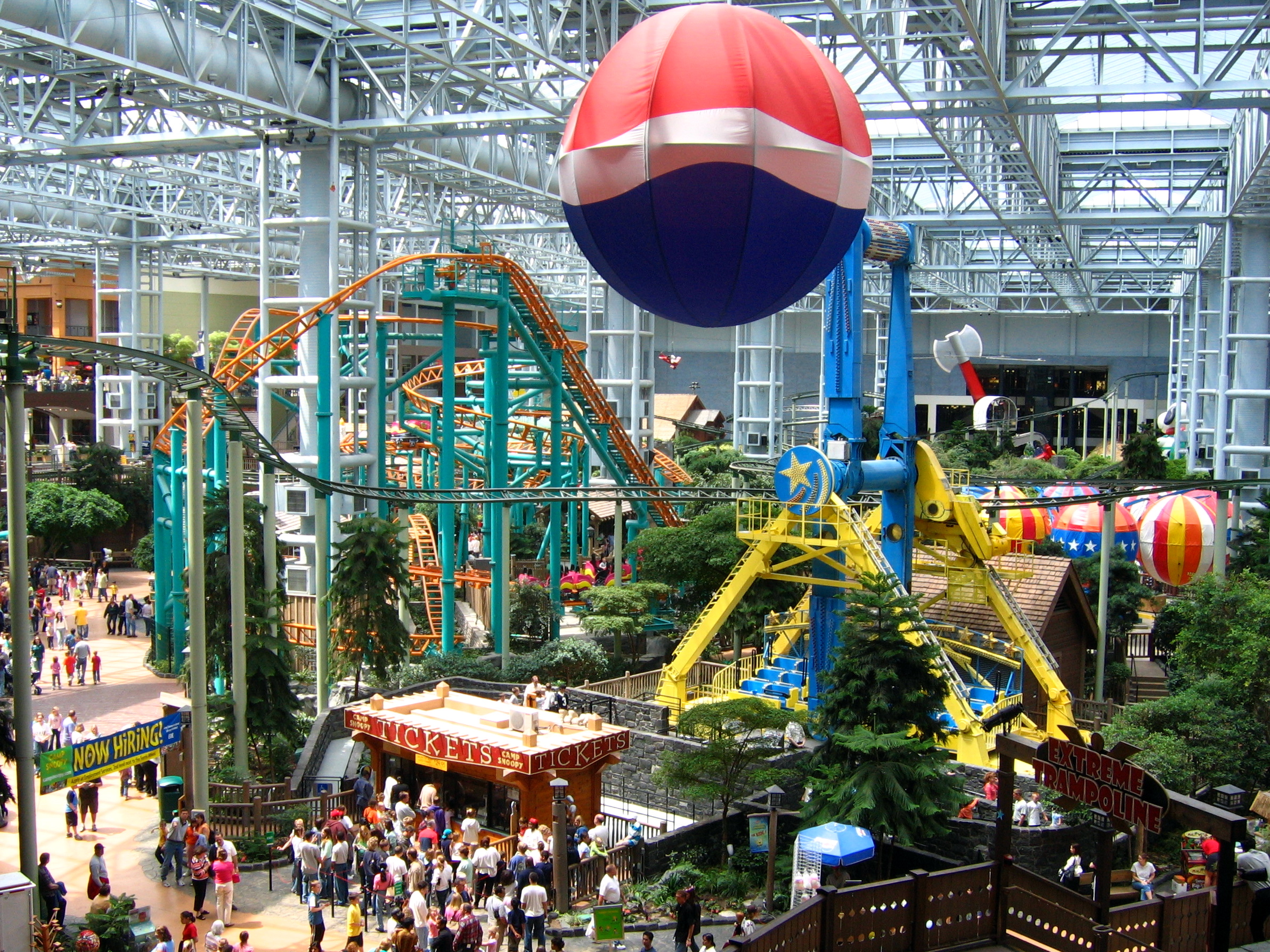
Indoor amusement park at the center of the Mall of America in Bloomington, Minnesota, the largest shopping mall in the United States

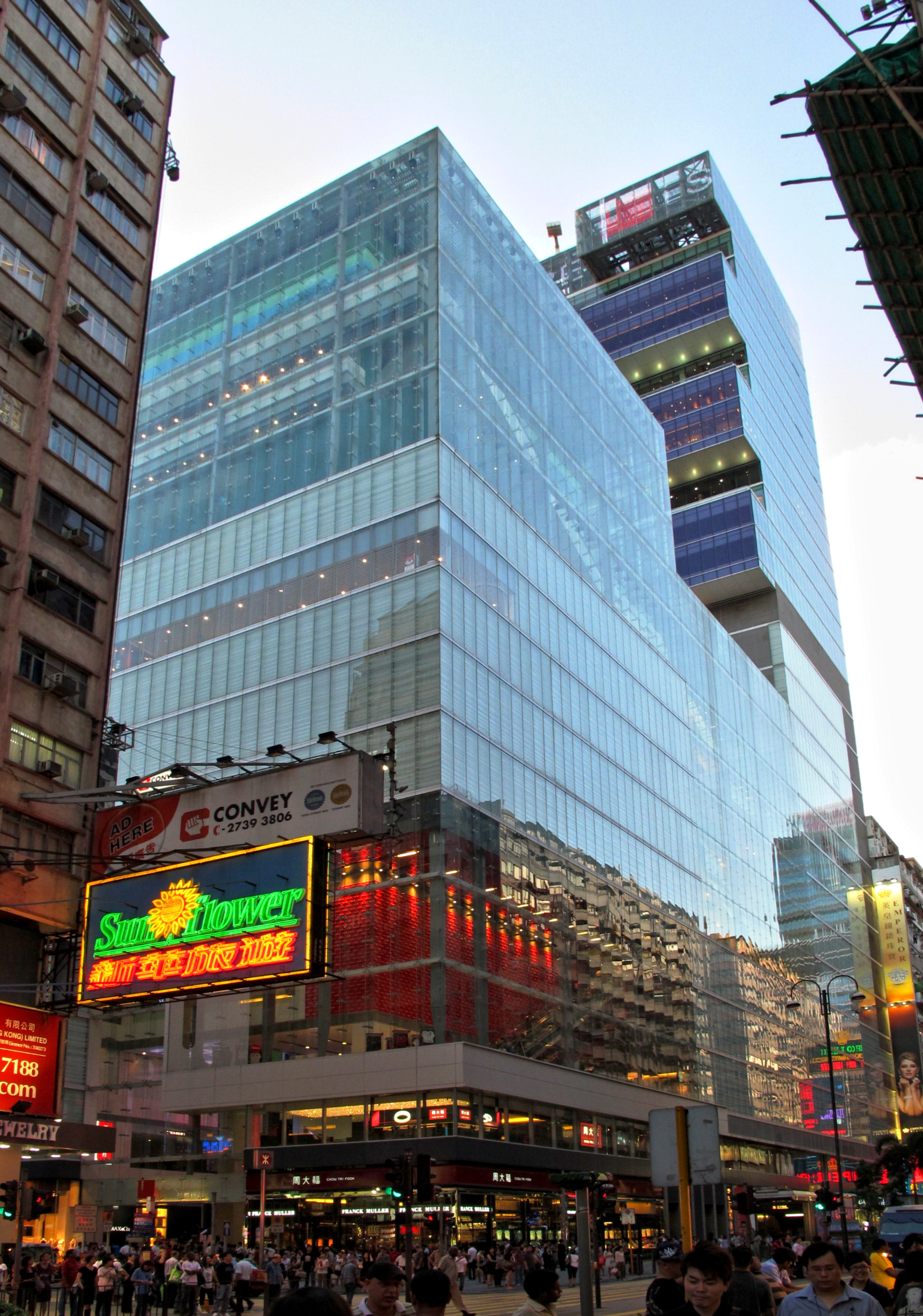
The 31 story ISQUARE vertical mall in Tsim Sha Tsui, Kowloon, Hong Kong in 2010

=== Vertical malls ===
High land prices in populous cities have led to the concept of the "vertical mall", in which space allocated to retail is configured over a number of stories accessible by elevators and/or escalators (usually both) linking the different levels of the mall. The challenge of this type of mall is to overcome the natural tendency of shoppers to move horizontally and encourage shoppers to move upwards and downwards. The concept of a vertical mall was originally conceived in the late 1960s by the Mafco Company, former shopping center development division of Marshall Field & Co. The Water Tower Place skyscraper in Chicago, Illinois was built in 1975 by Urban Retail Properties. It contains a hotel, luxury condominiums, and office space and sits atop a block-long base containing an eight-level atrium-style retail mall that fronts on the Magnificent Mile.

Vertical malls are common in densely populated conurbations in East and Southeast Asia. Hong Kong in particular has numerous examples such as Times Square, Dragon Centre, Apm, Langham Place, ISQUARE, Hysan Place and The One.

A vertical mall may also be built where the geography prevents building outward or there are other restrictions on construction, such as historic buildings or significant archeology. The Darwin Shopping Centre and associated malls in Shrewsbury, UK, are built on the side of a steep hill, around the former town walls; consequently the shopping center is split over seven floors vertically – two locations horizontally – connected by elevators, escalators and bridge walkways. Some establishments incorporate such designs into their layout, such as Shrewsbury's former McDonald's, split into four stories with multiple mezzanines which featured medieval castle vaults – complete with arrowslits – in the basement dining rooms.

== Components ==
=== Food court ===
A common feature of shopping malls is a food court: this typically consists of a number of fast food vendors of various types, surrounding a shared seating area.

=== Department stores ===
When the shopping mall format was developed by Victor Gruen in the mid-1950s, signing larger department stores was necessary for the financial stability of the projects, and to draw retail traffic that would result in visits to the smaller stores in the mall as well. These larger stores are termed anchor stores or draw tenants. In physical configuration, anchor stores are normally located as far from each other as possible to maximize the amount of traffic from one anchor to another.

== Regional differences ==
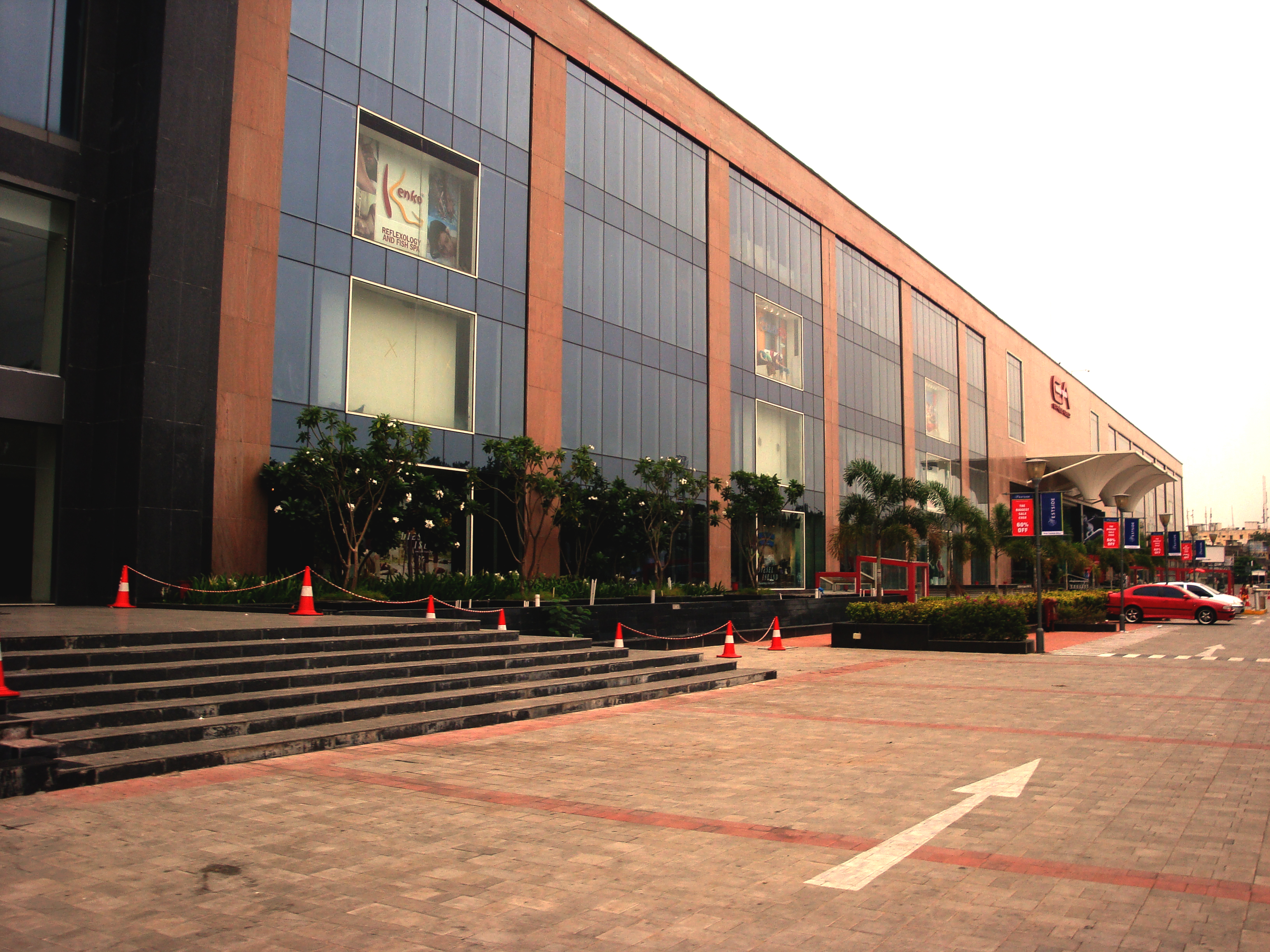
Express Avenue Chennai, India

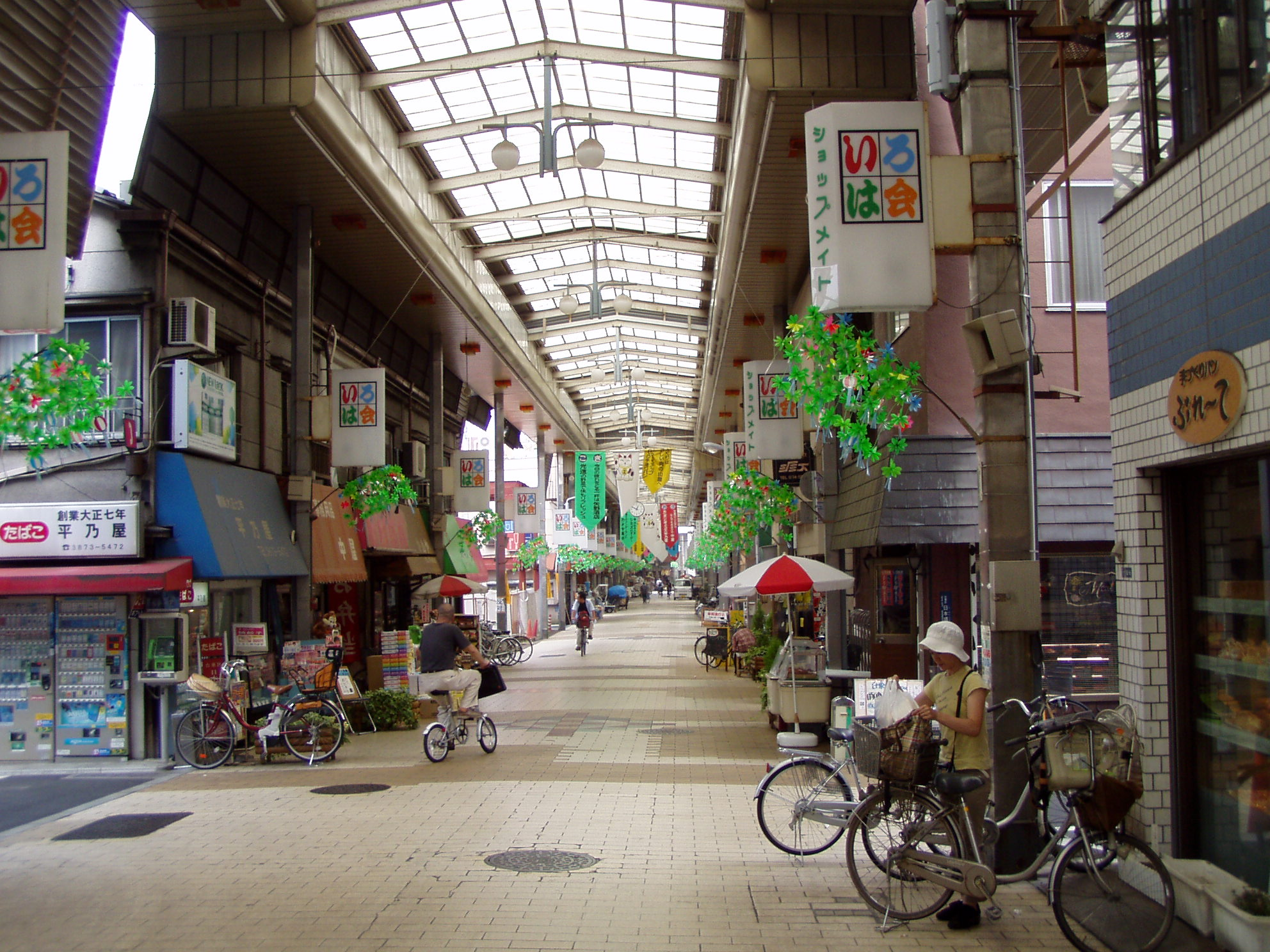
Shopping arcade in Tokyo, Japan

=== Europe ===
There are a reported 222 malls in Europe. In 2014, these malls had combined sales of US$12.47 billion. This represented a 10% bump in revenues from the prior year.

==== U.K. and Ireland ====
In the United Kingdom and Ireland, both open-air and enclosed centers are commonly referred to as shopping centres. Mall primarily refers to either a shopping mall – a place where a collection of shops all adjoin a pedestrian area – or an exclusively pedestrianized street that allows shoppers to walk without interference from vehicle traffic.

The majority of British enclosed shopping centres, the equivalent of a U.S. mall, are located in city centres, usually found in old and historic shopping districts and surrounded by subsidiary open air shopping streets. Large examples include Westquay in Southampton; Manchester Arndale; Bullring Birmingham; Liverpool One; Trinity Leeds; Buchanan Galleries in Glasgow; St James Quarter in Edinburgh; and Eldon Square in Newcastle upon Tyne. In addition to the inner city shopping centres, large UK conurbations will also have large out-of-town "regional malls" such as the Metrocentre in Gateshead; Meadowhall Centre, Sheffield serving South Yorkshire; the Trafford Centre in Greater Manchester; White Rose Centre in Leeds; the Merry Hill Centre near Dudley; and Bluewater in Kent. These centres were built in the 1980s and 1990s, but planning regulations prohibit the construction of any more. Out-of-town shopping developments in the UK are now focused on retail parks, which consist of groups of warehouse style shops with individual entrances from outdoors. Planning policy prioritizes the development of existing town centres, although with patchy success. Westfield London (White City) is the largest shopping centre in Europe.

==== Russia ====
In Russia, on the other hand, as of 2013 a large number of new malls had been built near major cities, notably the MEGA malls such as Mega Belaya Dacha mall near Moscow. In large part they were financed by international investors and were popular with shoppers from the emerging middle class.

== Management and legal issues ==
=== Shopping property management firms ===
A shopping property management firm is a company that specializes in owning and managing shopping malls. Most shopping property management firms own at least 20 malls. Some firms use a similar naming scheme for most of their malls; for example, The Mills Corporation puts "Mills" in most of its mall names and SM Prime Holdings of the Philippines puts "SM" in all of its malls, as well as anchor stores such as The SM Store, SM Appliance Center, SM Hypermarket, SM Cinema, and SM Supermarket. In the UK, The Mall Fund changes the name of any center it buys to "The Mall (location)", using its pink-M logo; when it sells a mall the center reverts to its own name and branding, such as the Ashley Centre in Epsom. Similarly, following its rebranding from Capital Shopping Centres, intu Properties renamed many of its centres to "intu (name/location)" (such as intu Lakeside); again, malls removed from the network revert to their own brand (see for instance The Glades in Bromley).

=== Legal issues ===
One controversial aspect of malls has been their effective displacement of traditional main streets or high streets. Some consumers prefer malls, with their parking garages, controlled environments, and private security guards, over central business districts (CBD) or downtowns, which frequently have limited parking, poor maintenance, outdoor weather, and limited police coverage.

In response, a few jurisdictions, notably California, have expanded the right of freedom of speech to ensure that speakers will be able to reach consumers who prefer to shop, eat, and socialize within the boundaries of privately owned malls. The Supreme Court decision Pruneyard Shopping Center v. Robins was issued on 9 June 1980 which affirmed the decision of the California Supreme Court in a case that arose out of a free speech dispute between the Pruneyard Shopping Center in Campbell, California, and several local high school students.

== World's largest malls ==
This is a list of the world's largest shopping malls based on their total floor area, including those with at least 250,000 m^{2} (2,700,000 sq ft).

Rank	Mall	Country	City (metropolitan area)	Year opened	Total floor area	Shops	Remarks
1	Iran Mall	Iran	Tehran	2018	1,950,000 m^{2} (21,000,000 sq ft)	2,500+	Largest mall in the world
2	The Avenues Mall	Kuwait	Al Rai	2007	1,200,000 m^{2} (13,000,000 sq ft)	1,400+	Largest mall in the Arabian Peninsula
3	IOI City Mall	Malaysia	Putrajaya	2014	821,000 m^{2} (8,840,000 sq ft)	650+	Largest mall in Malaysia and South East Asia
4	Isfahan City Center	Iran	Isfahan	2012	776,000 m^{2} (8,350,000 sq ft)	700+	Contains the biggest indoor amusement park in the Middle East at 776,000 m^{2} (8,350,000 sq ft). Built in two phases in 2012 and 2019.
5	South China Mall	China	Dongguan	2005	659,612 m^{2} (7,100,000 sq ft)	2,350	Until at least 2014 most of the stores were empty, with occupancy rates of only 10%.
6	SM Mall of Asia	Philippines	Pasay (Metro Manila)	2006	589,891 m^{2} (6,349,530 sq ft)	3,500+	The largest mall in the Philippines with IT parks, MoA Arena, hotels, university, an IKEA building, bay-area resorts, and amusement parks; a total reclamation of 1,047 hectares (2,590 acres) is anticipated upon completion
7	SM City Tianjin	China	Tianjin	2016	565,000 m^{2} (6,080,000 sq ft)	1,000+	The largest SM mall outside of the Philippines
8	Golden Resources Mall	China	Beijing	2004	557,419 m^{2} (6,000,010 sq ft)	750+	
9	Central WestGate	Thailand	Nonthaburi (Bangkok Metropolitan Region)	2015	550,278 m^{2} (5,923,140 sq ft)	500+	The gross floor area of the mall includes the floor area of the mall building with various shops which is 500,000 square meters (5.4 million square feet) and the floor area of the IKEA store which is 50,278 m^{2} (541,190 sq ft).
10 (tie)	CentralWorld	Thailand	Bangkok	1989	550,000 m^{2} (5,900,000 sq ft)	600	Area of the full complex is 1,024,000 m^{2} (11,020,000 sq ft) including two skyscrapers.
10 (tie)	Iraq Mall	Iraq	Baghdad	2026	550,000 m^{2} (5,900,000 sq ft)	350+	32,000 m^{2} (340,000 sq ft) of entertainment area
12	ICONSIAM	Thailand	Bangkok	2018	525,000 m^{2} (5,650,000 sq ft)	550+	
13	Mall of America	United States	Bloomington, Minnesota (Minneapolis–Saint Paul)	1992	520,257 m^{2} (5,600,000 ft^{2})	520	The ranking area does not include Nickelodeon Universe, a large indoor amusement park at the center of the mall with an area of 28,000 m^{2} (300,000 sq ft). Largest mall in the United States and the Americas.
14	1 Utama	Malaysia	Petaling Jaya	1995	519,328 m^{2} (5,590,000 sq ft)	503	The 2nd largest shopping mall in Malaysia. Built in three phases in 1995, 2003 and 2018.
15	Persian Gulf Complex	Iran	Shiraz	2011	500,000 m^{2} (5,400,000 sq ft)	2500+	Second largest shopping mall by number of stores after Iran Mall.
16	SM City North EDSA	Philippines	Quezon City (Metro Manila)	1985	497,213 m^{2} (5,351,960 sq ft)	1,000+	Formerly the largest mall in the Philippines (2008–2011, 201?–2014, and 2015–2021), until IKEA opened in SM Mall of Asia on 25 November 2021.
17	Global Harbor	China	Shanghai	2013	480,000 m^{2} (5,200,000 sq ft)	450+	
18	SM Megamall	Philippines	Mandaluyong (Metro Manila)	1991	474,000 m^{2} (5,100,000 sq ft)	1,000+	Has the most cinema screens (14) in the Philippines.
19	SM Seaside City Cebu	Philippines	Cebu City	2015	470,486 m^{2} (5,064,270 sq ft)	700+	Largest shopping mall in the Philippines outside Metro Manila.
20	Dream Mall	Taiwan	Kaohsiung	2007	401,218.67 m^{2} (4,318,681.8 sq ft)	2300	Largest mall in Taiwan.
21 (tie)	Sunway Pyramid	Malaysia	Subang Jaya	1997	400,000 m^{2} (4,300,000 sq ft)	1000+	Third largest shopping mall in Malaysia behind 1 Utama. Built in three phases in 1997, 2007 and 2016.
21 (tie)	New Century Global Center	China	Chengdu	2013	400,000 m^{2} (4,300,000 sq ft)	2,300	
21 (tie)	Siam Paragon	Thailand	Bangkok	2005	400,000 m^{2} (4,300,000 sq ft)	200+	
21 (tie)	Central Phuket	Thailand	Phuket	2004	400,000 m^{2} (4,300,000 sq ft)	250+	Major expansion ("Floresta" building) in 2018.
21 (tie)	Festival Alabang	Philippines	Muntinlupa (Metro Manila)	1998	400,000 m^{2} (4,300,000 sq ft)	250+	
26	Lotte World Mall	South Korea	Seoul	2014	383,470 m^{2} (4,127,600 sq ft)	200+	Largest shopping mall in South Korea.
27 (tie)	Jamuna Future Park	Bangladesh	Dhaka	2013	380,000 m^{2} (4,100,000 sq ft)	510	Largest shopping mall in South Asia.
27 (tie)	Albrook Mall	Panama	Panama City	2002	380,000 m^{2} (4,100,000 sq ft)	200+	Second largest shopping mall in the Americas; the largest until 2013.
29	Mal Taman Anggrek	Indonesia	Jakarta	1996	360,000 m^{2} (3,900,000 sq ft)	150	Hosts the world's largest LED display.
30 (tie)	Fashion Island (Thailand)	Thailand	Bangkok	1995	350,000 m^{2} (3,800,000 sq ft)	150	
30 (tie)	West Edmonton Mall	Canada	Edmonton, Alberta	1981	350,000 m^{2} (3,800,000 sq ft)	800+	Largest shopping mall in Canada. The gross leasable area does not include Galaxyland, a large indoor amusement park with an area of 70,160 m^{2} (755,200 sq ft).
30 (tie)	The Dubai Mall	United Arab Emirates	Dubai	2008	350,000 m^{2} (3,800,000 sq ft)	400+	The second largest mall in the world by total land area.
33 (tie)	Big City	Taiwan	Hsinchu	2012	340,000 m^{2} (3,700,000 sq ft)	300	
33 (tie)	Lucky One Mall	Pakistan	Karachi	2017	340,000 m^{2} (3,700,000 sq ft)	200+	Largest mall in Pakistan.
35	Gandaria City	Indonesia	Jakarta	2010	336,279 m^{2} (3,619,680 sq ft)	250	
36 (tie)	Limketkai Center	Philippines	Cagayan de Oro	1992	320,000 m^{2} (3,400,000 sq ft)	250	
36 (tie)	Berjaya Times Square	Malaysia	Kuala Lumpur	2003	320,000 m^{2} (3,400,000 sq ft)	200+	The largest shopping mall in Kuala Lumpur and 4th largest shopping mall in Malaysia behind IOI City Mall, 1 Utama and Sunway Pyramid.
38	SM City Fairview	Philippines	Quezon City (Metro Manila)	1997	312,749 m^{2} (3,366,400 sq ft)	350	
39	The Grand Central Mall	Pakistan	Faisalabad	Under-Construction	310,000 m^{2} (3,300,000 sq ft)		2nd-largest mall in Pakistan
40 (tie)	Zhengjia Plaza (Grandview Mall)	China	Guangzhou	2005	280,000 m^{2} (3,000,000 sq ft)	180+	
40 (tie)	American Dream Meadowlands	United States	East Rutherford, New Jersey (New York City area)	2019	280,000 m^{2} (3,000,000 sq ft)	200	Includes Nickelodeon Universe, DreamWorks Water Park, and Big Snow American Dream
40 (tie)	Haikou International Duty Free City	China	Haikou, Hainan	2022	280,000 m^{2} (3,000,000 sq ft)		Largest duty-free shopping mall in the world
40 (tie)	Future Park Rangsit	Thailand	Thanyaburi, Pathum Thani	1995	280,000 m^{2} (3,000,000 sq ft)	1000	600,000 square meters including Zpell
44	SM City Cebu	Philippines	Cebu City	1993	273,804 m^{2} (2,947,200 sq ft)	680	
45	The Avenues, Bahrain	Bahrain	Bahrain Bay	2017	273,000 m^{2} (2,940,000 sq ft)		
46	Sarath City Capital Mall	India	Hyderabad	2019	270,000 m^{2} (2,900,000 sq ft)^{2}	400+	The biggest shopping mall in India.
47	Medan Centre Point	Indonesia	Medan	2013	270,000 m^{2} (2,900,000 sq ft)^{2}		
48	Mal Artha Gading	Indonesia	Jakarta	2004	270,000 m^{2} (2,900,000 sq ft)	330	
49	Mall of Arabia	Saudi Arabia	Jeddah	2010	261,000 m^{2} (2,810,000 sq ft)	187	
50	King of Prussia Mall	United States	King of Prussia (Philadelphia metropolitan area)	1963	259,500 m^{2} (2,793,000 sq ft)	200+	Originally built as two buildings, a 2016 renovation made it one continuous building, larger than Mall of America by 1,300 m^{2} (14,000 sq ft).
51	Greenwich Mall	Russia	Ekaterinburg	2006	258,673 m^{2} (2,784,330 sq ft)	250	The largest shopping center in Russia
52	Centro Comercial Aricanduva	Brazil	São Paulo	1991	257,047 m^{2} (2,766,830 sq ft)	545+	The largest shopping center in South America. It is the 5th largest shopping center in the world (2019)
53	T.S. Mall	Taiwan	Tainan	2015	254,000 m^{2} (2,730,000 sq ft)	200+	
54	Tunjungan Plaza	Indonesia	Surabaya	1986	253,187 m^{2} (2,725,280 sq ft)	250	The biggest mall in East Java
55 (tie)	Emporium Mall	Pakistan	Lahore	2016	250,000 m^{2} (2,700,000 sq ft)	200+	3rd largest mall in Pakistan
55 (tie)	Centro Sambil	Venezuela	Caracas	1998	250,000 m^{2} (2,700,000 sq ft)	300	
55 (tie)	Aventura Mall	United States	Aventura (Miami area)	1983	250,000 m^{2} (2,700,000 sq ft)	300+	Largest shopping mall in Florida.
55 (tie)	Glorietta	Philippines	Makati (Metro Manila)	1991	250,000 m^{2} (2,700,000 sq ft)	300+	Glorietta is integrated with Greenbelt, both of which are owned by the Ayala Corporation.
55 (tie)	Greenbelt	Philippines	Makati (Metro Manila)	1991	250,000 m^{2} (2,700,000 sq ft)	300+	Greenbelt is integrated with Glorietta, both of which are owned by the Ayala Corporation.
55 (tie)	South Coast Plaza	United States	Costa Mesa (Greater Los Angeles)	1967	250,000 m^{2} (2,700,000 sq ft)	286	The largest shopping mall in California besides Del Amo.
55 (tie)	Centro Comercial Santafé	Colombia	Bogota	2006	250,000 m^{2} (2,700,000 sq ft)	150	

=== Combination retail and wholesale shopping malls ===
Some wholesale market complexes also function as shopping malls in that they contain retail space which operate as stores in normal malls do but also act as producer vendor outlets that can take large orders for export.

Name	Country	City	Year opened	Gross leasable area	Shops	Remarks
Yiwu International Trade City	China	Yiwu	2002	5,500,000 m^{2} (59,000,000 sq ft)	75,000+	Much of the retail area is divided into small booths, hence the disproportionately greater number of shops than other malls listed.

== In popular culture ==
There are several movies that are set in a shopping mall, either entirely or in part, including Mallrats, Fast Times at Ridgemont High, Bad Santa, Paul Blart: Mall Cop, and Chopping Mall, among many others.

In season 2, episode 9 of the American sitcom, How I Met Your Mother, it is revealed that Robin Scherbatsky has a secret past of being a teenage Canadian pop star and, under the name Robin Sparkles, has a hit single entitled "Let's Go To The Mall".

== See also ==
- Arcade
- Bazaar
- List of largest shopping malls in the Philippines
- List of largest shopping malls in the United States
- Lists of shopping malls
- Mall kiosk
- Parade of shops
- Pedestrian zone
- Retail outlet types
