= Shopping (Luleå) =

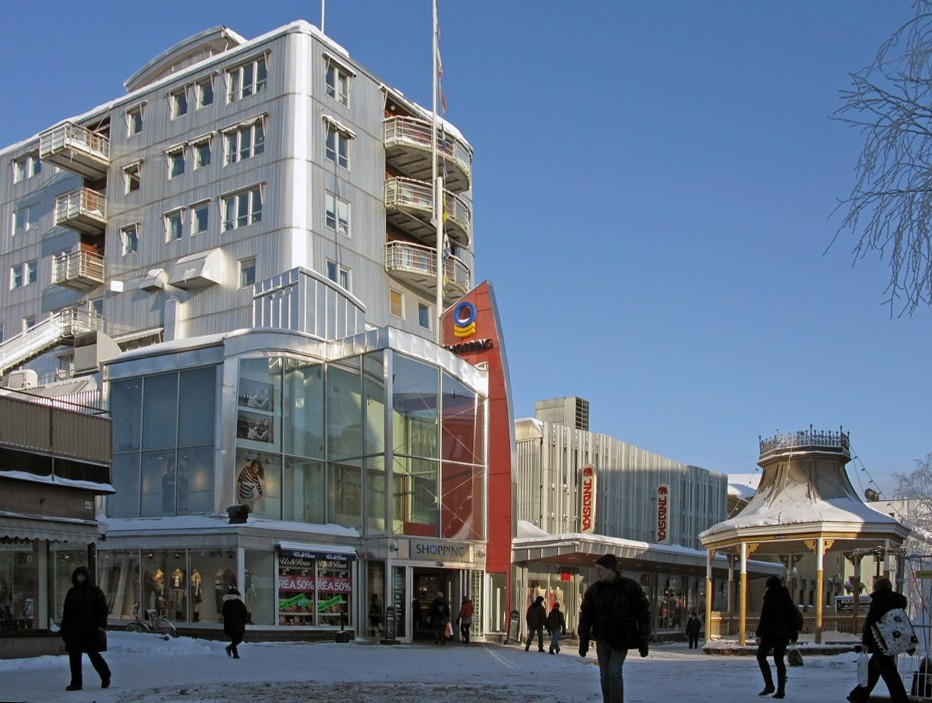
- Location: Luleå, Sweden
- Coordinates: 65.5850°N 22.1553°E
- Address: Storgatan 51, Luleå
- Opened: 27 October 1955
- Owner: Norrporten
- Architect: Ralph Erskine
- Website: shoppinglulea.se

Shopping is a shopping mall in downtown Luleå, Sweden. Designed by architect Ralph Erskine, it was the first purpose built indoor shopping centre in the world when it opened in October 1955. Erskine designed it with an intent to let "city life" move indoors during the cold seasons. Since its inauguration, it has seen multiple refurbishments and alterations, but is still used as a shopping mall.

== See also ==
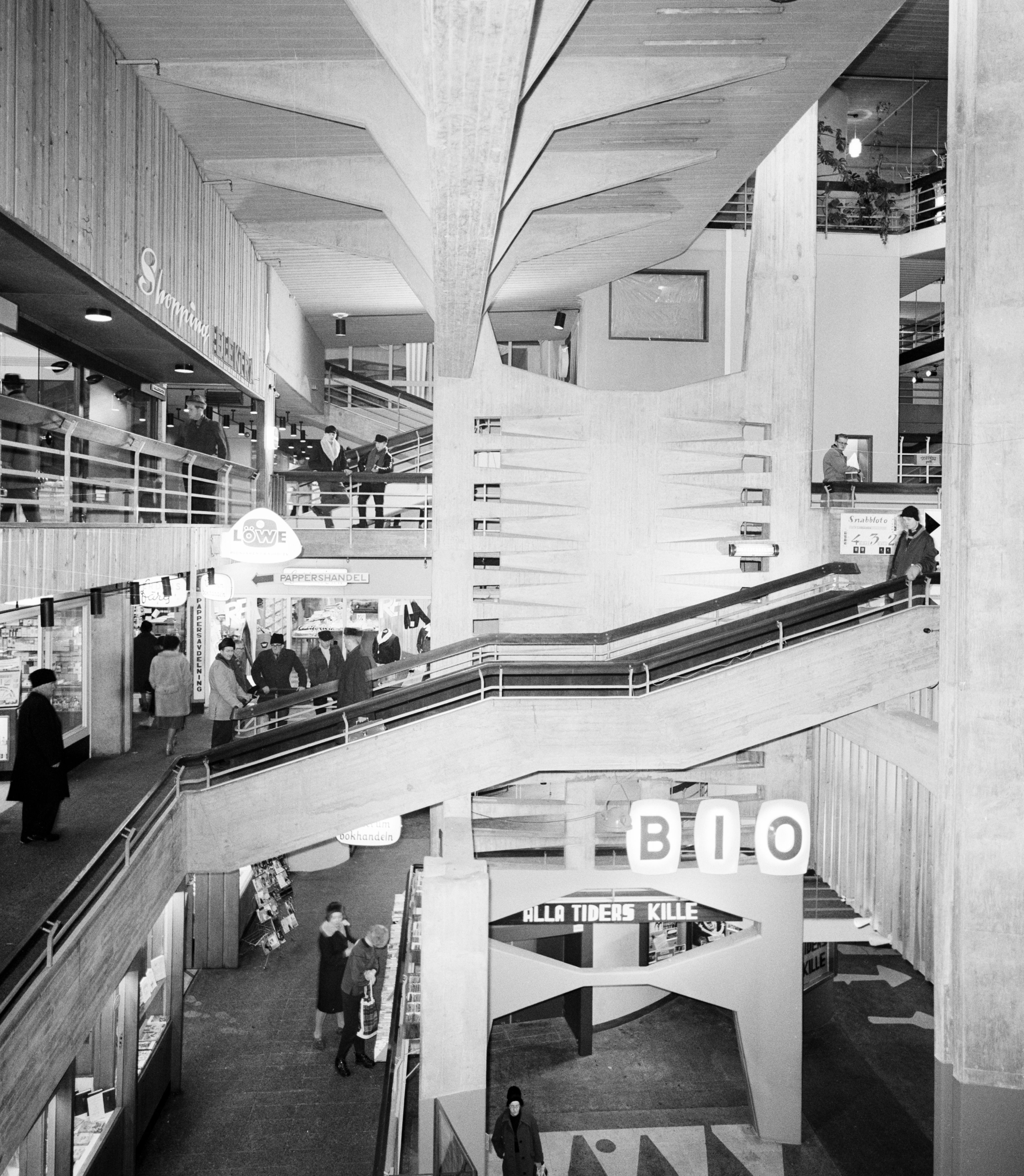
Original interior, 1955.

- Midtown Plaza (Rochester)
