= Singapore School Bandung =

Indonesian international school

Information
- Established: June 2024; 1 year ago
- Language: English; Mandarin; Indonesian
- Affiliation: Singapore Intercultural Schools
- Website: sisschools.org/sis-bandung/

Singapore School, Bandung (SIS-BDG), sometimes referred to as SIS Bandung, is a private, early childhood to junior college school in Bandung, Indonesia. It is a member of the SIS Group of Schools, Indonesia. The Bandung branch was re-established in June 2024. Initially, a SIS branch was opened in Bandung in July 2007 and subsequently closed in 2011.

The initial former campus in Citra Green, Dago included a multi-purpose hall, library, IT laboratory, science laboratories, soccer field, canteen, and indoor playground. Singapore School Bandung uses the Singapore Curriculum and uses English, Mandarin, and Indonesian as a medium of instruction. For primary students, core subjects include science, mathematics, Indonesian, English, Chinese, and Social Studies. For secondary levels, core subjects are science, geography, mathematics, English, and Chinese.

Due to a change in management of the building in Citra Green, Dago in 2009, SIS Bandung was relocated to a much smaller campus in the heart of downtown Bandung and eventually closed its doors in 2011. The much smaller downtown campus is currently occupied by UNISBA.

After SIS' relocation to downtown Bandung in 2009, the former campus in Citra Green, Dago was occupied by a newly established school called Stamford International School (renamed Stamford School later on in 2015) until its closure in 2021. As of 2022, the Citra Green campus has since been occupied by a new school; Global Prestasi School (GPS) Bandung.

In 2022, it was announced that there were plans for SIS to re-open a campus in Bandung.

On 27 May 2024, the SIS Group of Schools announced a strategic partnership with Sekolah Mutiara Nusantara (SMN), an international school located in Northern Bandung, to rebrand the latter and establish SIS Bandung. As part of the strategic partnership and transition, the SIS Bandung campus and curriculum will be managed by the SIS Group of Schools and the SMN brand will be phased out and replaced over the coming years. SIS Bandung will also see significant investment in technology and facilities including the integration of advanced technological tools such as Virtual Reality (VR), Augmented Reality (AR) and Robotics into the curriculum to ensure its students are well-prepared for the future.

== See also ==
- Singapore Intercultural School, Indonesia
