= Kelapa Gading =

- District
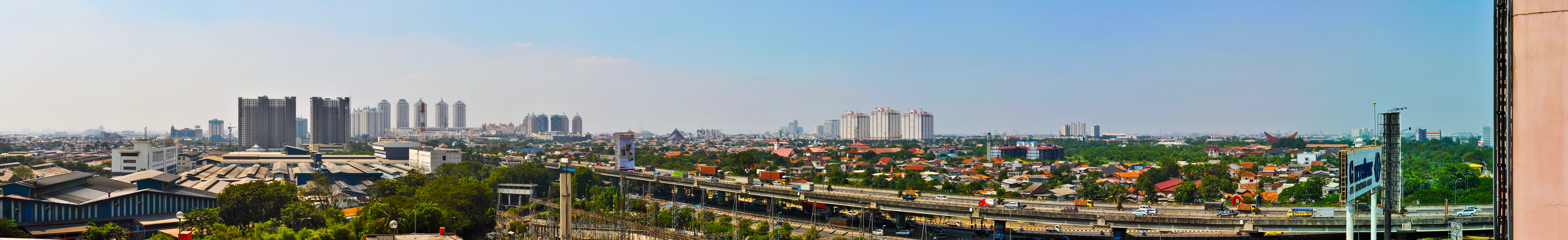
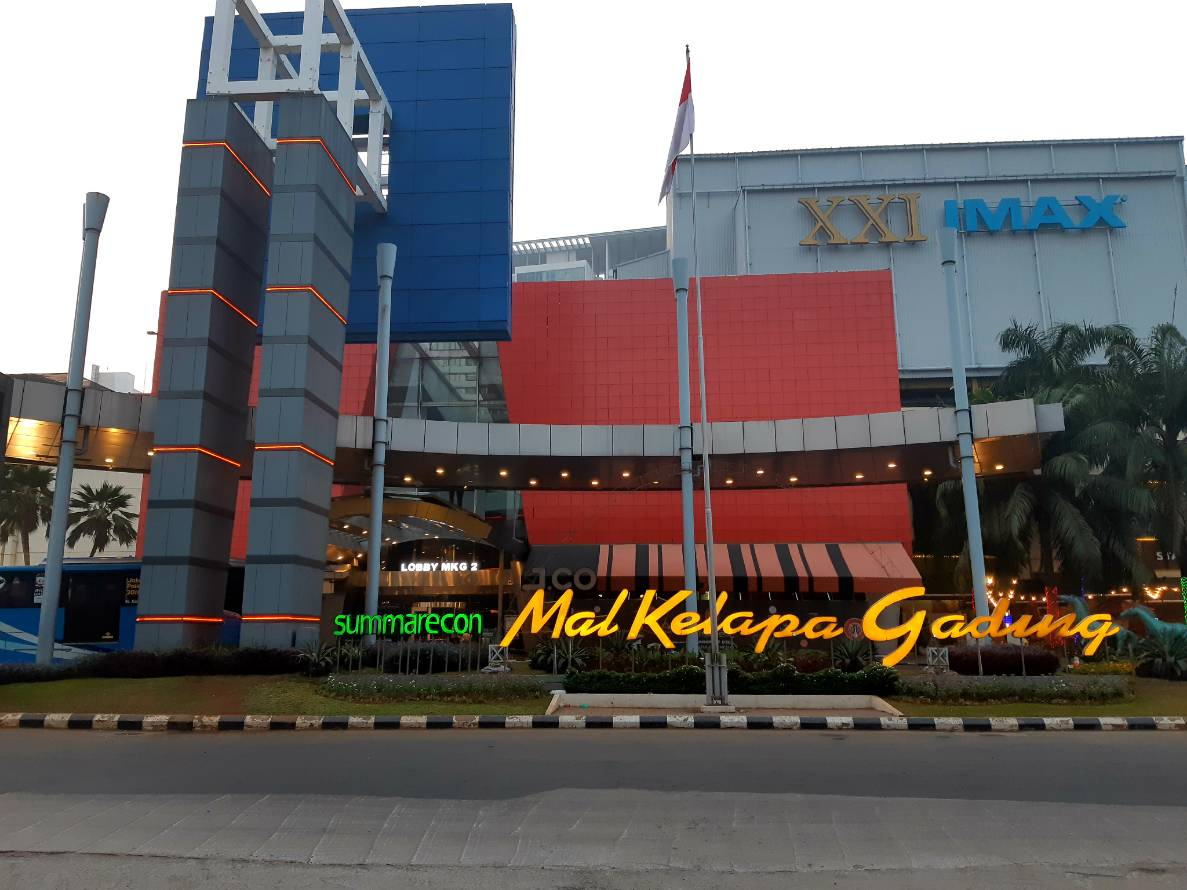
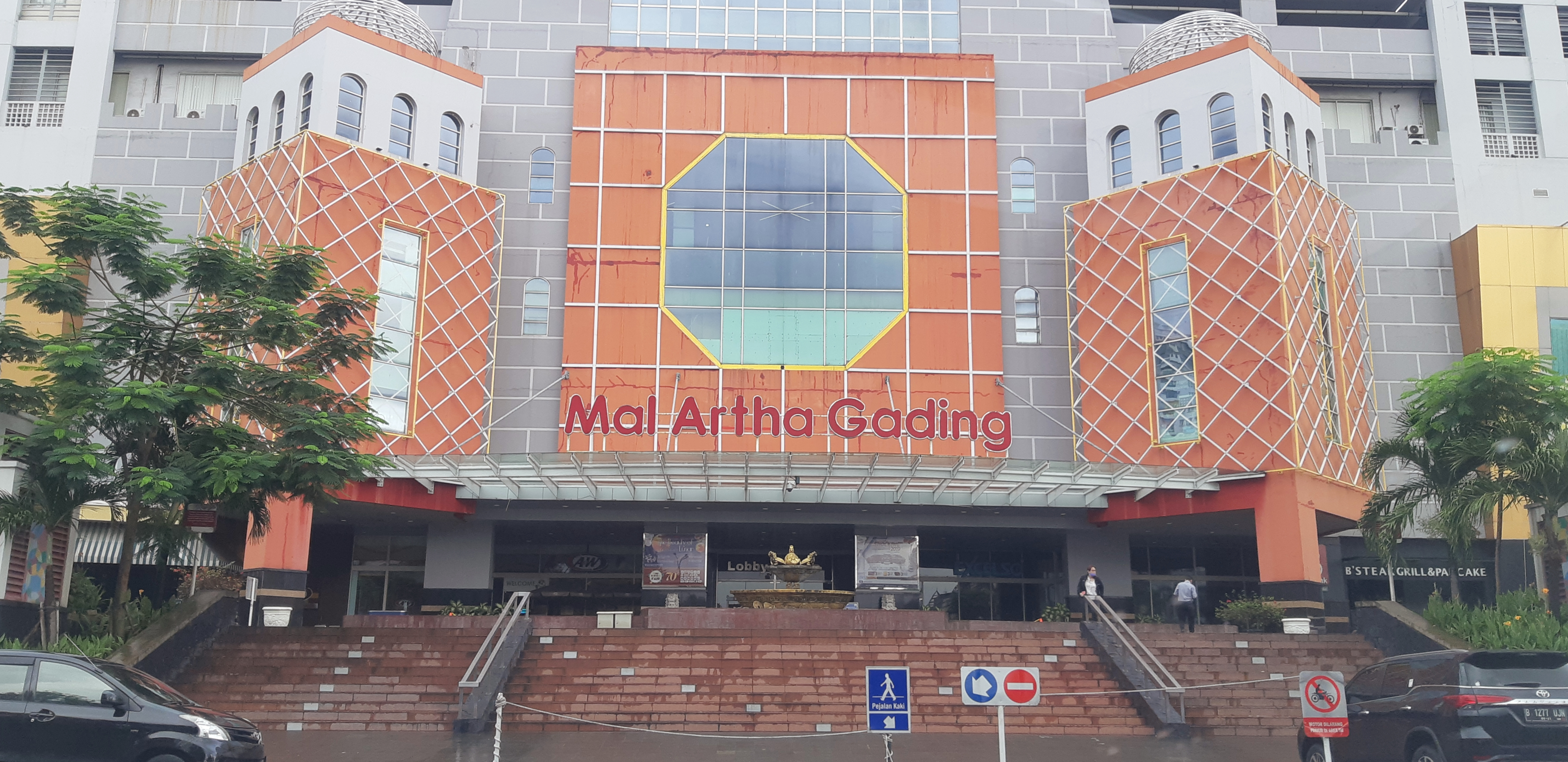
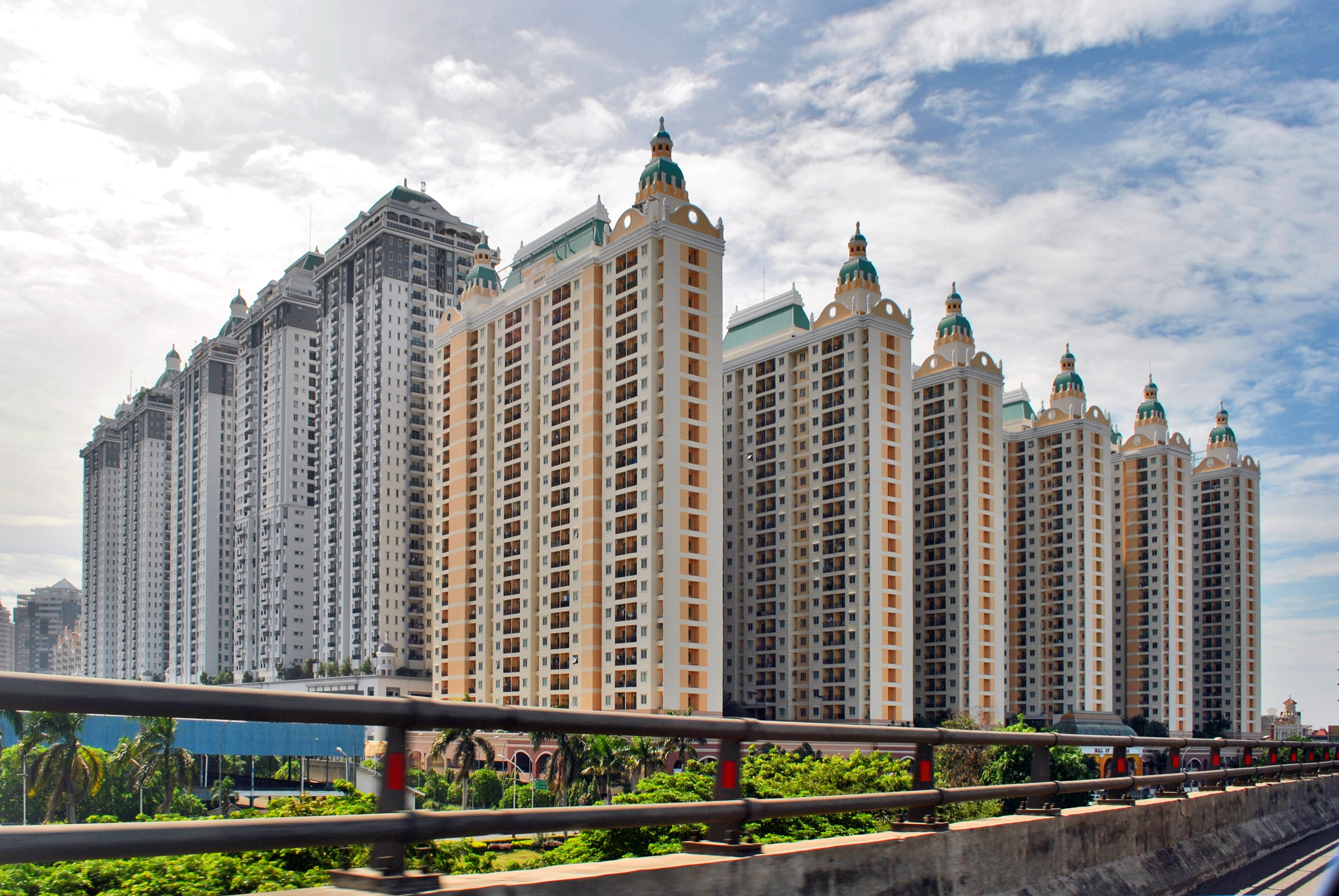
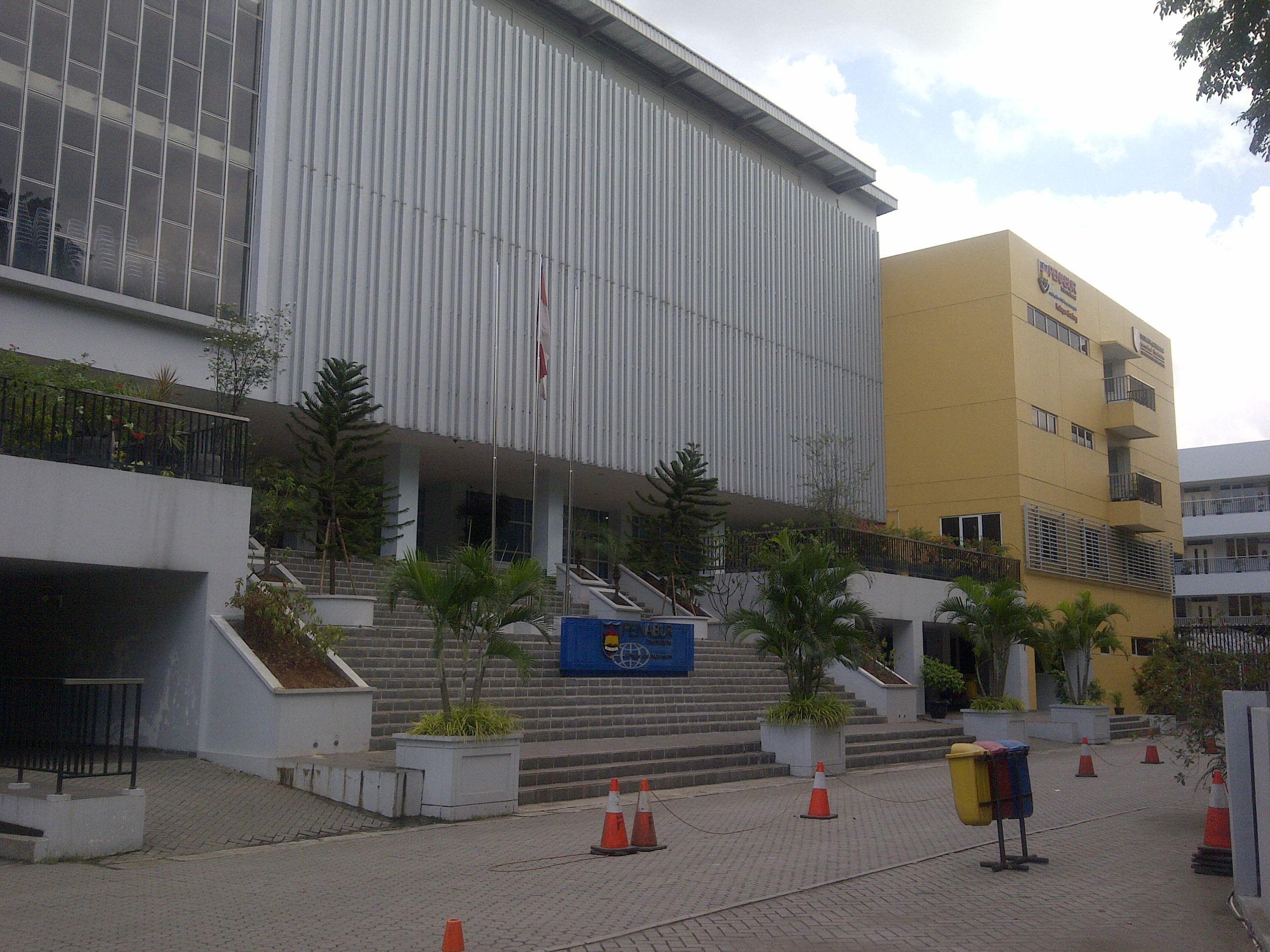
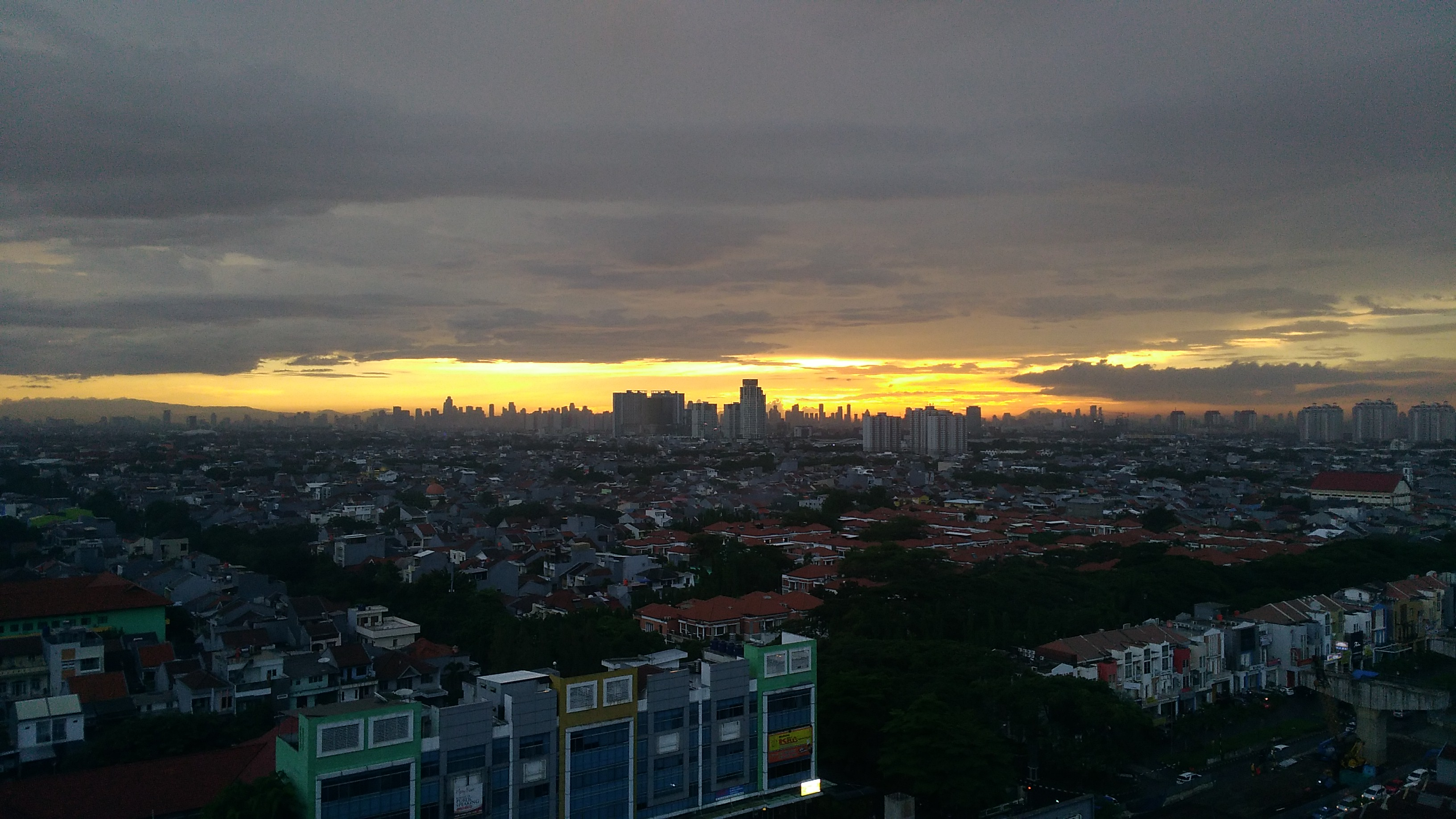
- From top, left to right: Kelapa Gading skyline, Mall Kelapa Gading, Mal Artha Gading, Apartment Kelapa Gading Square, Penabur International School Kelapa Gading, and view of Kelapa Gading district
- Interactive map of Kelapa Gading
- Country: Indonesia
- Province: Jakarta
- Administrative city: North Jakarta
- Postal code: 14240, 14250

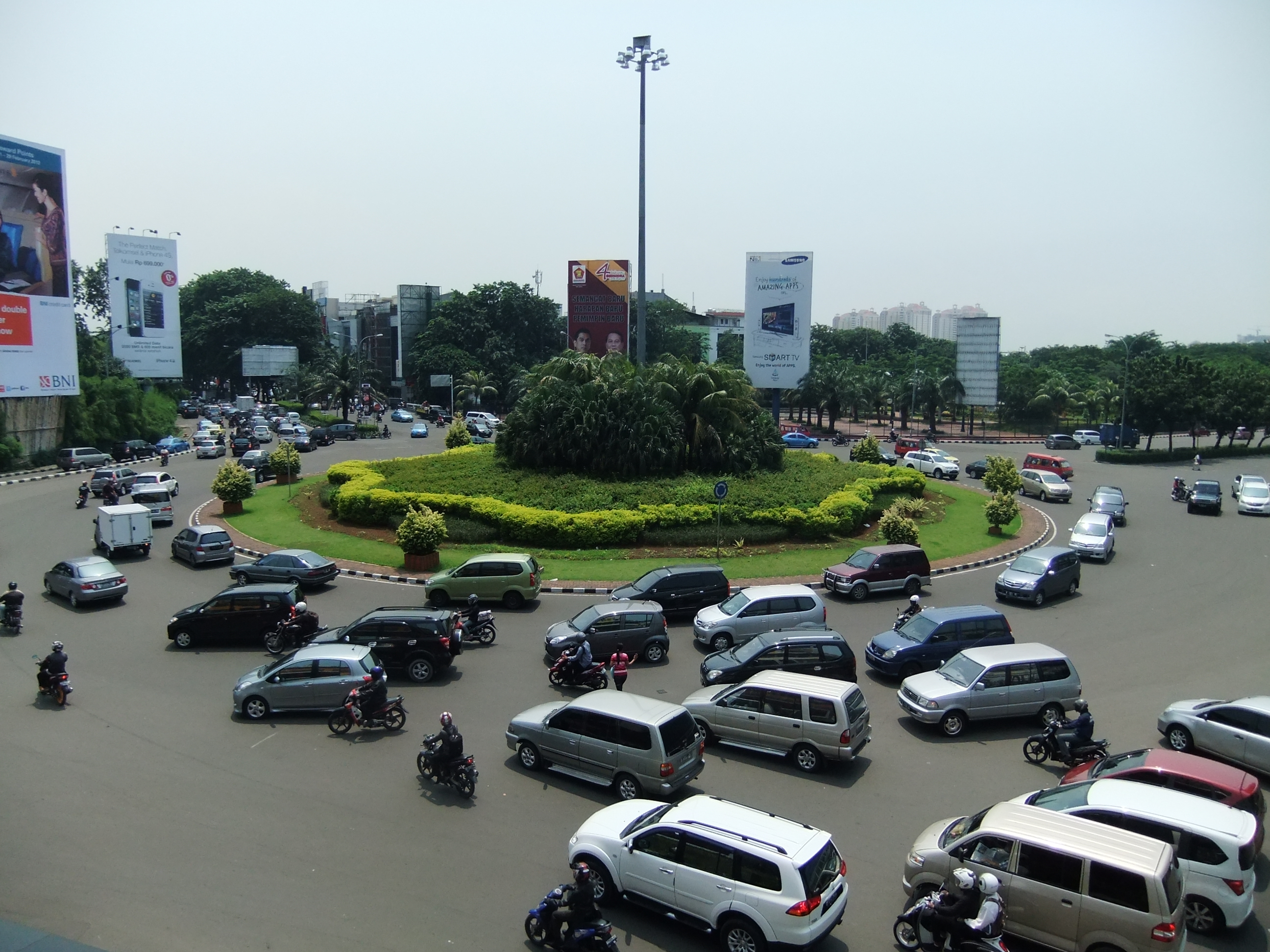
Kelapa Gading Roundabout

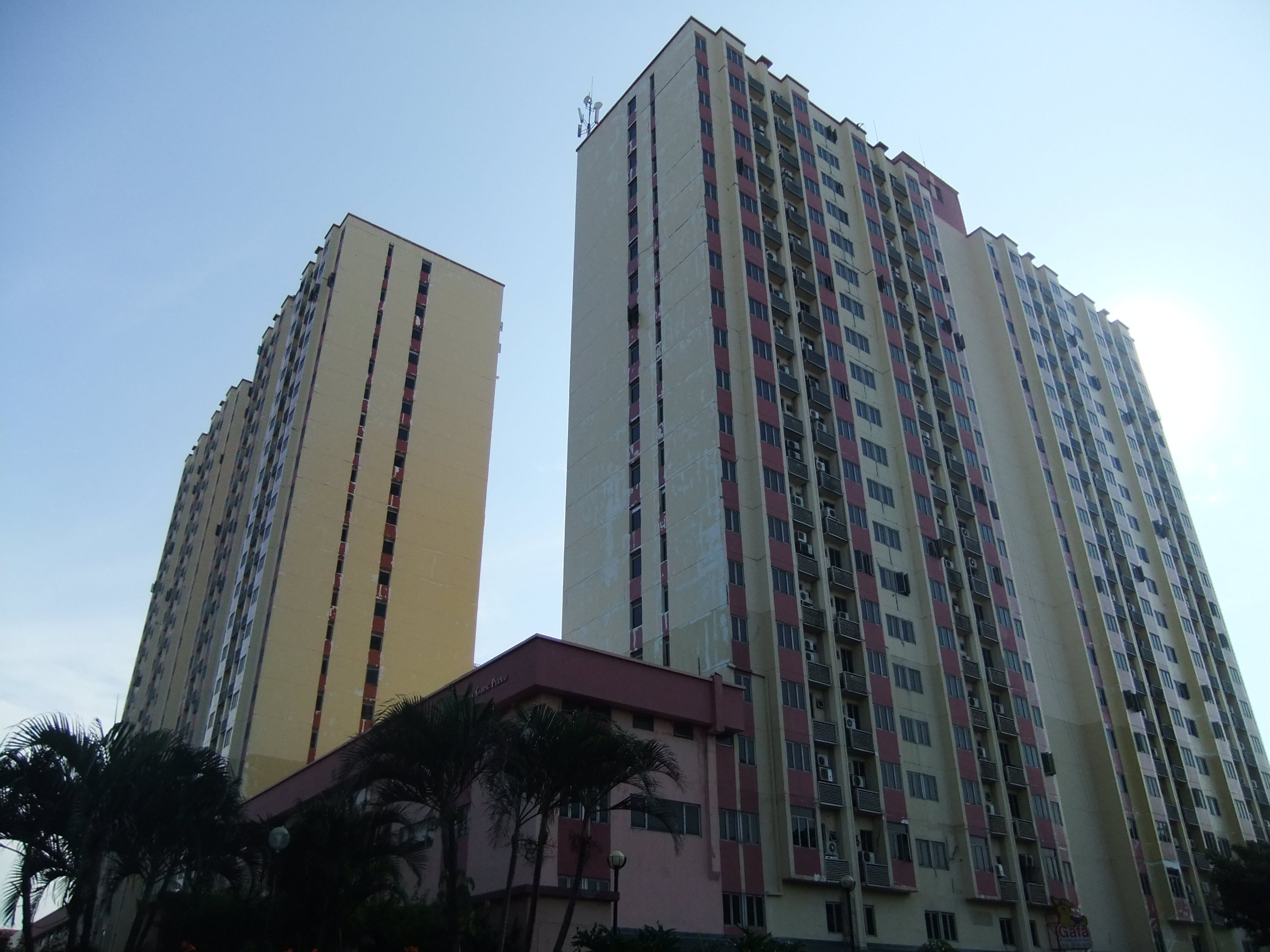
Wisma Gading Permai Apartments

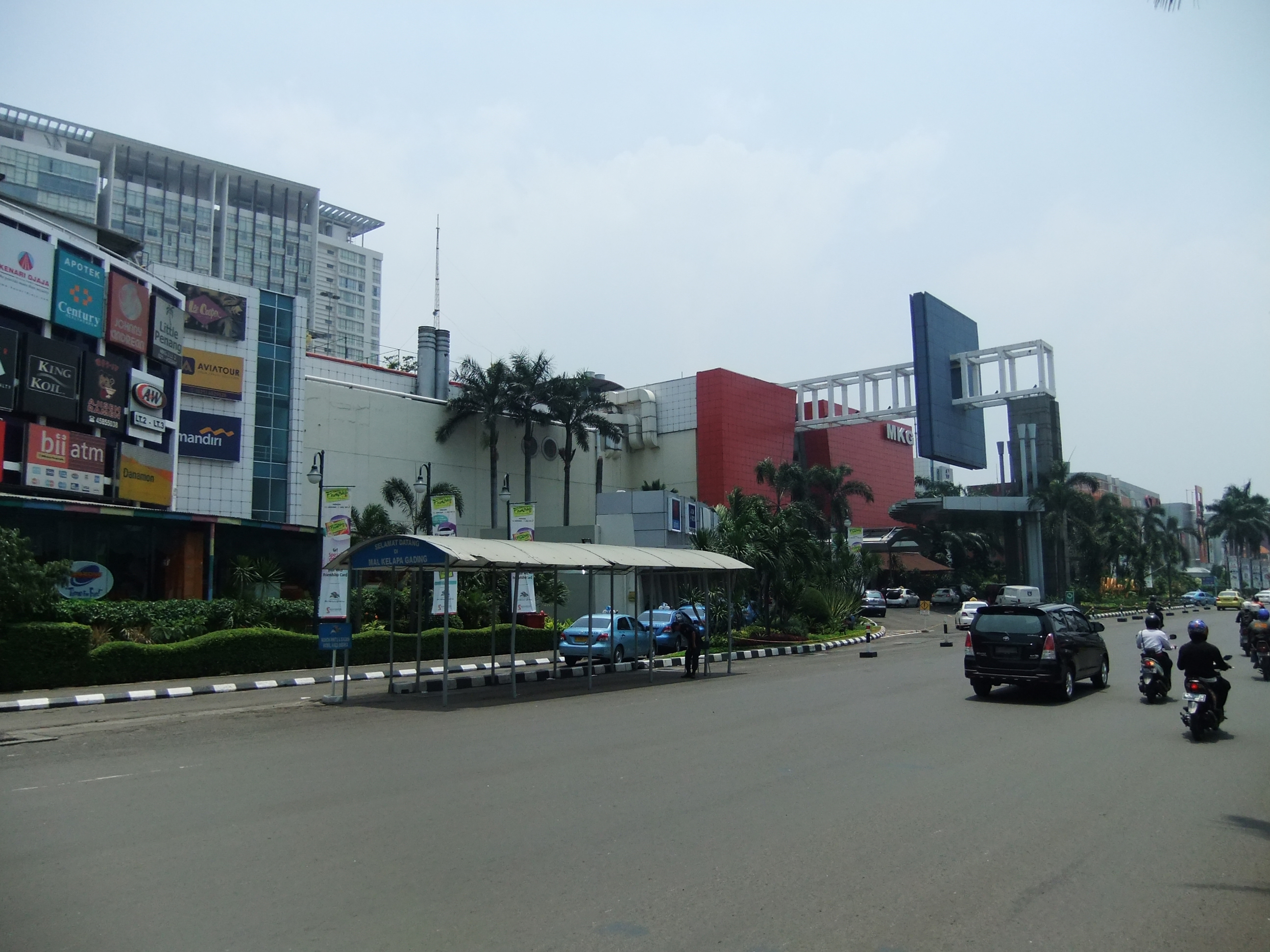
Kelapa Gading Mall

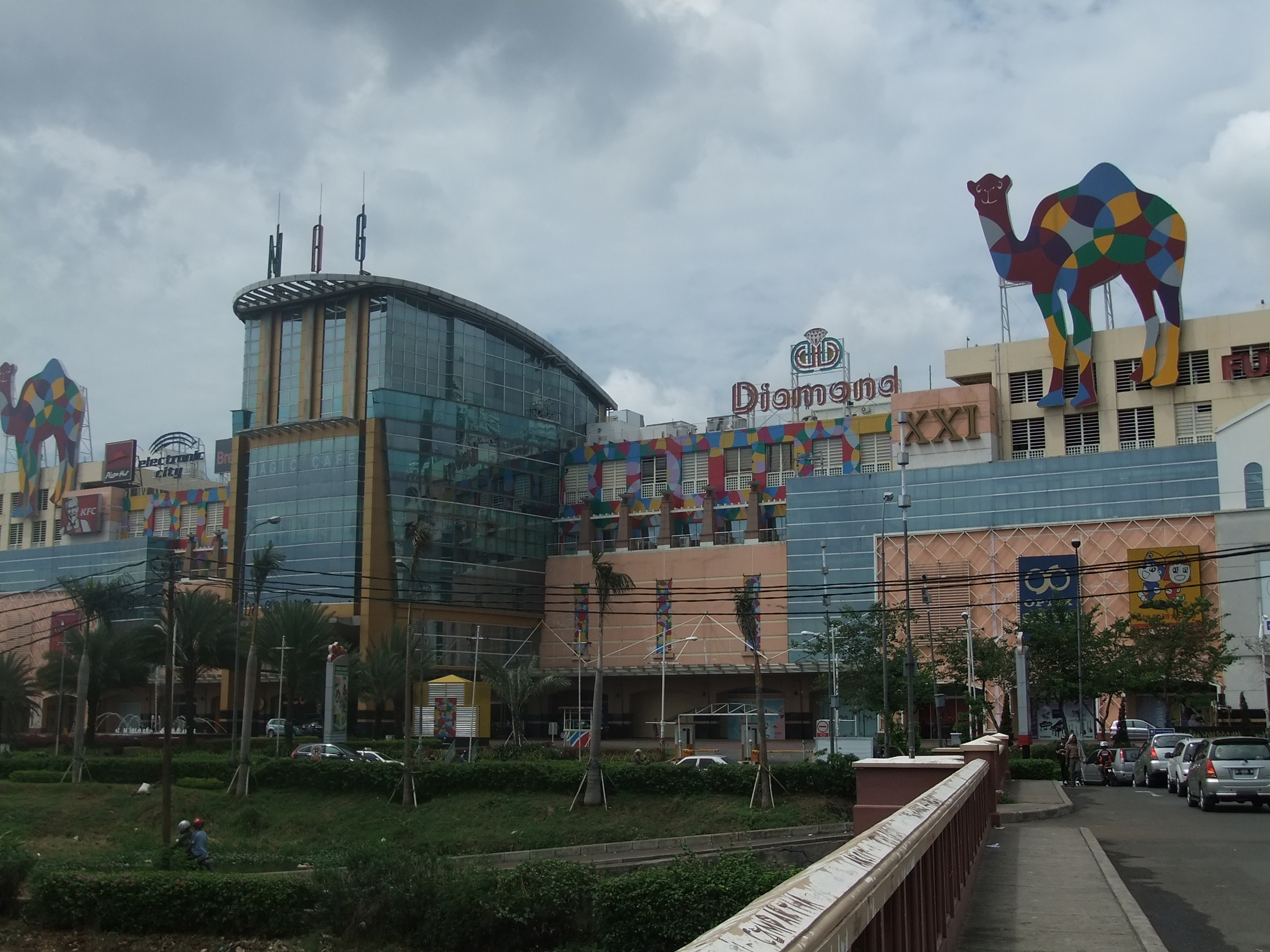
Artha Gading Mall

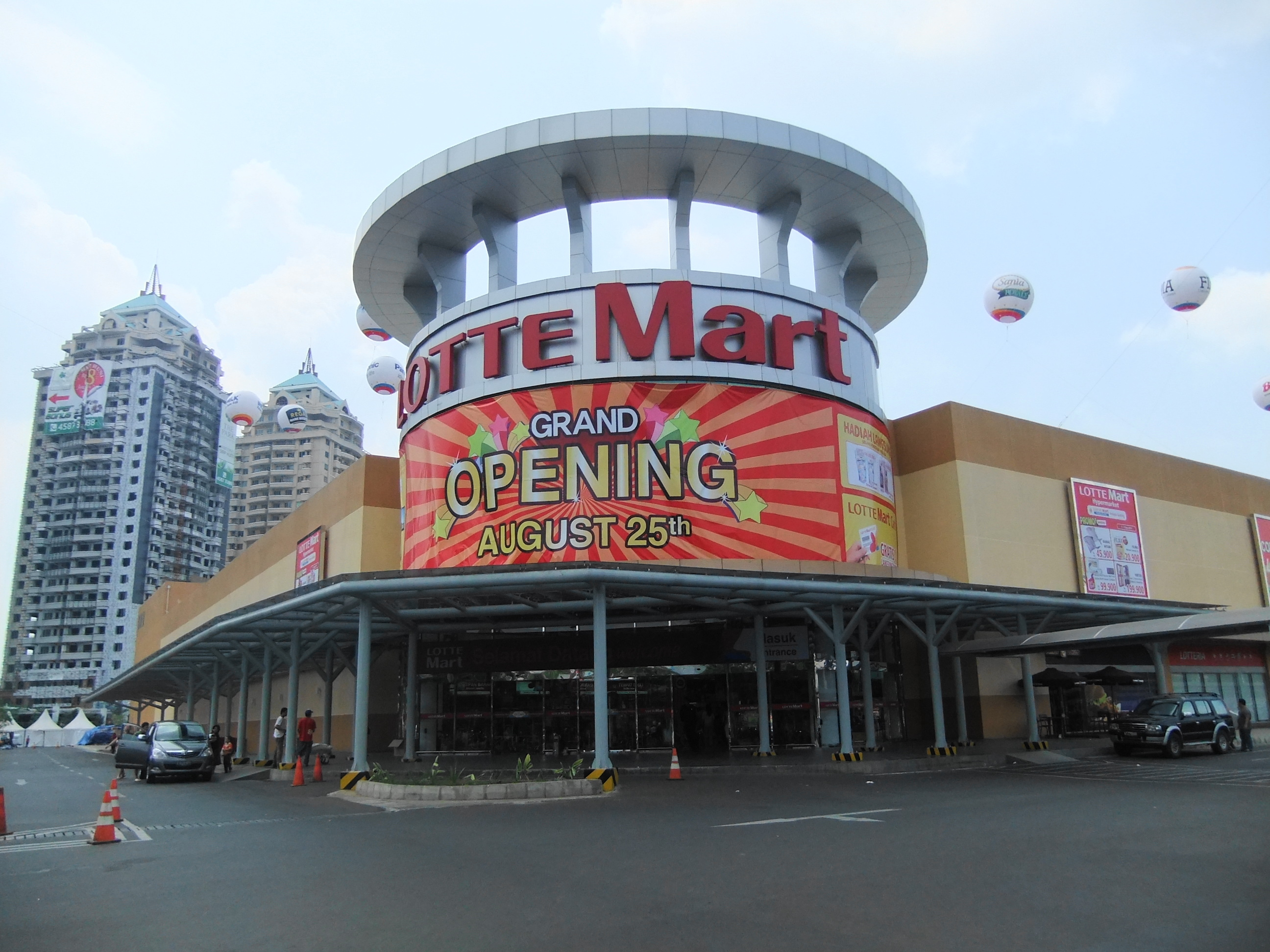
Lotte Mart at Kelapa Gading

Kelapa Gading or also known as KG or Gading, is a district (Indonesian: kecamatan) of the administrative city of North Jakarta, Indonesia. The district is known to the local population as a city within a city, due to the integrated residential-commercial planning, and the supporting facilities.

== History ==
The area that was going to be Kelapa Gading was an undeveloped marshland and sparsed agricultural land until 1976, when a local real estate developer company, known as PT Summarecon Agung, developed the area into a more productive land by establishing an integrated residential-commercial area in a grid-like urban planning with main boulevards and supporting facilities including schools and hospitals.

== Government ==
As a district (Indonesian kecamatan), Kelapa Gading is the southernmost district of North Jakarta. Kelapa Gading has a total land area of 1,633.7 hectares (4,037 acres). The district is bounded by Bekasi Raya - Perintis Kemerdekaan Road to the south, Sunter Canal to the west, Bendungan Batik Canal to the north, and Cakung - Petukangan River to the east.

Kelapa Gading is divided into 3 kelurahan (administrative villages):

- Kelapa Gading Barat - area code 14240
- Kelapa Gading Timur - area code 14240
- Pegangsaan Dua - area code 14250

== Residential ==
Kelapa Gading as a residential area is generally targeted toward the middle to upper market, though there are exceptions with non-gated residences. The residences of Kuta and Artha Gading Villa in Bukit Gading Villa are up-market areas in the location. The prime location and luxury contribute to the price factor. About 65% of the residents of Kelapa Gading are Chinese Indonesians. Since the late 1990s, vertical residences started to be built in Kelapa Gading. Starting from Kondominium Menara Kelapa Gading on the east gate, Wisma Gading Permai, to Gading Mediterranean Residences. After that, more apartment buildings continued to fill Kelapa Gading.

== Commercial ==
Kelapa Gading is famous amongst food lovers as varieties of Indonesian food like Chinese food, Minang food and Javanese food, as well as non-Indonesian cuisine such as Thai, Japanese and Western foods. The central point in Kelapa Gading is an area known as Gading Food City 6.16022°S 106.90624°E. The Jakarta Fashion & Food Festival is annually held in several locations of this area.

The district of Kelapa Gading contains multiple shopping malls. Some of the well-known malls in the district include Mal Kelapa Gading (the first and the largest shopping mall in Kelapa Gading, opened in 1990 by PT Summarecon Agung), Mal Artha Gading, Kelapa Gading Trade Center, Bella Terra, and Mall of Indonesia.

Kelapa Gading is popular for its nightlife, with several bars and entertainment places that open up until late at night. Known as the world's capital of Bakmi (meat noodle), Kelapa Gading provides a large variety of Bakmi noodles that can be found, such as noodles from Bangka, Makassar, Pontianak, Japanese ramen, Korean-styled noodles, and others. .

== Flooding problem ==
Despite being a well-developed area, Kelapa Gading is affected by floods, mainly during the rainy season, due to its geographically low plain characteristics (5 meters above sea level) and the lack of an effective flood diversion network established by the district developer. The district was severely affected by the 2007 Jakarta flood, the worst flooding disaster in Jakarta.

Flood control infrastructures in Kelapa Gading include several small reservoirs in the Administrative Village of Kelapa Gading Barat, with linking water channels.

Since 2010, the East Flood Channel began functioning, diverting water that used to cross Kelapa Gading's surrounding waterway. Many are hoping that this flood channel can make Kelapa Gading flood-free.

Between 2008 and 2011, no crucial flood struck the area. In 2020, however, the area was overwhelmed with multiple floods.

Because of the ongoing risk of flooding, many homes in Kelapa Gading are built elevated, with inclined driveways leading up from street level to the ground level of the house.

== Education ==
- North Jakarta Intercultural School is located in Kelapa Gading.
- SIS Kelapa Gading is an IB curriculum school located in Kelapa Gading.
- Raffles Christian School Kelapa Gading is a Cambridge curriculum school located in Kelapa Gading
- Sekolah Menengah Atas Kristen 5 BPK Penabur Kelapa Gading is one of the most prestigious Christian school located in Kelapa Gading
- Sekolah Menengah Pertama Kristen 4 BPK Penabur Kelapa Gading is another notable and prestigious Christian school academically and non-academically, it is also founded by the same institution as SMAK-5 Penabur Jakarta and shares the same building as them.
- Mahatma Gading School is one of the schools in Kelapa Gading which provides both the national curriculum and Cambridge curriculum or just the Cambridge curriculum.

There are also many state-run schools in the district.

== Transportation ==
Kelapa Gading has a considerable road access to all areas throughout the city. To the west of this area, there is a network of inner-city toll roads that connects all areas of the city and Soekarno-Hatta International Airport. There is also a toll road going through Kelapa Gading that is called Kelapa Gading - Pulo Gebang Toll.

The area is served by TransJakarta bus network. Jakarta LRT passes through Kelapa Gading.

== List of important places ==
- Mall of Indonesia
- Mal Artha Gading
- Mal Kelapa Gading
- The BritAma Arena

== Notable residents ==
- Novel Baswedan, investigator for the Corruption Eradication Commission
- Alan Budikusuma, former badminton player
- Hotman Paris Hutapea, lawyer
- Denny Sumargo, actor and former basketball player
- Susi Susanti, former badminton player
