= Jakarta Tourism and Culture Office =

- Dinas Pariwisata & Kebudayaan Daerah Khusus Ibukota Jakarta
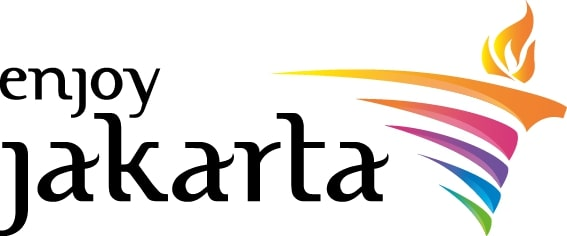
- Enjoy Jakarta Logo

Agency overview
- Jurisdiction: Jakarta
- Headquarters: Jakarta
- Website: http://www.jakarta-tourism.go.id/

The Jakarta Tourism and Culture Office (JTCO) (Indonesian: Dinas Pariwisata dan Kebudayaan DKI Jakarta is one of the Department of Government of Jakarta. The Jakarta Tourism and Culture Office is responsible for culture and tourism affairs in Jakarta.

== History ==
Before JTCO was established, the government formed Jakarta Tourism Supervisor Organization (Bapparda Jaya) on February 7, 1967, as the realization of Presidium Decision Ampera Cabinet no. 103/4TAP/2/66.

It was Bapparda Jaya that originated the existence of JTCO. Although administratively JTCO was established on September 20, 1970, however, February 7 has been settled as the commemoration day of Disparbud.

Jakarta as a non-oil sector has vastly developed its tourism potential among the world. It has successfully become the mainstay of foreign exchange and yet influences other cities in Indonesia to improve their tourism potentials. The government originally formed an organization unit that specially handled tourism in Jakarta. Based on Local Regulation (Perda) no. 3/2001, Jakarta Tourism Office was established, whereas Organization Structure and Working Procedure were based on Jakarta Governor Policy no. 107/2001.

With several changes on the bureaucracy on both central and regional levels, the organization structure of the Jakarta government also changed. According to Local Regulation (Perda) no. 10/2008 on Regional Organization, Tourism Office affiliated with Culture and Museum Office becoming Tourism and Cultural Office. In the other hand, Organization Structure and Working Procedure were regulated by Governor Policy no. 107/2009.

== Visions, missions, goals ==
Visions

- Jakarta Tourism and Culture Office, in doing each and every duty, as the economy executive on tourism sector has visions as follow: “Jakarta as Tourism and Culture Destination with International Standard”
- Lying beneath this vision is the strong will of government of Jakarta, especially Disparbud to make Jakarta equal with other big cities in the world as the widely known tourism and culture destination.

Mission

- Developing sources and products of tourism and culture
- Encouraging the empowerment of people, community, or any tourism and cultural organizations
- Developing the infrastructure of tourism and culture.

Goals

- Increasing the promotion and publicity of tourism and culture
- Actualizing an accountable, effective, and efficient governance execution on tourism and culture.

== Main task and function ==
According to Local Regulation no. 10/2008 on Regional Organization, main task or function of Jakarta Tourism and Culture Office is “Carrying out tourism matters and regional culture”. To fulfill the main task, Disparbud has functions as follow:

- Preparation and implementation of the work plan and budget the office
- Technical implementation of the policy of tourism and cultural matters
- Enforcement of tourism and culture matters
- Guidance and development of tourism and culture industry
- Empowerment of tourism and cultural community
- Assessment and development of tourism and cultural matters
- Supervision, control, and action on tourism and cultural matters
- Service, guidance, and control of certification recommendation and/or business licensing in tourism and culture area
- Collection, administration, deposit, report, and responsibility of admission fees in tourism and culture area
- Guidance and development of functional power and technical power in tourism and culture area
- Protection, development, and utilization of environment and cultural heritage
- Utilization, preservation, maintenance, and supervision of environment and cultural heritage
- Development of tourism and culture relation on both domestic and foreign
- Execution of tourism and culture service
- Development of tourism destination area
- Promotion and marketing of tourism and culture
- Management of tourism and cultural infrastructures such as National Monument, Ismail Marzuki Park, and Lokasari Folk Entertainment Park
- Establishment of legislation on tourism and culture
- Provision, administration, use, maintenance, and upkeep of tourism and cultural infrastructure
- Technical support to society regional tools; employment, finance, goods, and administration of Tourism and Culture Office
- Report and responsibility on executing duties and functions

== Organization structure ==
Each field is also divided into several divisions and sub-divions as follow:

1. Head Division

2. Head Deputy Division

3. Secretariat:

- Sub-division of Public
- Sub-division of Employment Affair
- Sub-division of Program and Budget
- Sub-division of Finance

4. Assessment and Development Field

- Product Section
- Market Analysis Section
- Regulation Section

5. Community Empowerment Field

- Community Section
- Institutional Section
- Human Resources Section

6. Destination Attraction Management Field

- Event Attraction Section
- Natural and Artificial Attraction Section
- History and Museum Section

7. Promotion Field

- Domestic Promotion Section
- Overseas Promotion Section
- International Relations Section

8. Tourism Industry Field

- Entertainment and Attraction Section
- Accommodation and Restaurant Section
- Tourism Business Section

9. Infrastructure Field

- Infrastructure Section
- Tool Section
- Environmental Regulation Section

10. Supervision and Control Field

- Tourism and Culture Industry Supervision Section
- Cultural Heritage Supervision Section
- Action Section

11. Tourism Office of Municipalities

- Office Head
- Administration Sub-division
- Tourism Industry Section
- Attraction and Community Empowerment Section
- Monitoring Section

12. Culture Office of Municipalities

- Office Head
- Administration Sub-division
- Community Empowerment Section
- Performance and Exhibition Section
- Infrastructure Section
- Service and Monitoring Section

13. Tourism and Culture Office of Kepulauan Seribu Administrative Regency

- Office Head
- Sub-division of Administration
- Tourism Section
- Culture Section

14. Tourism Office of Sub-district Section

15. Culture Office of Sub-district Section

16. Executor Unit

- Executor Unit of Training Center and Certification of Tourism
- Executor Unit of Development and Tourism Information Service Center
- Executor Unit of Graha Wisata
- Executor Unit of National Monument
- Executor Unit of Jakarta's Anjungan at TMII
- Executor Unit of History Museum
- Executor Unit of Wayang Museum
- Executor Unit of Fine Arts and Ceramics
- Executor Unit of Bahari Museum
- Executor Unit of Textile Museum
- Executor Unit of Joang ’45 Museum
- Executor Unit of Kota Tua Development
- Executor Unit of Conservation Hall
- Executor Unit of Archeology Park Onrust Island
- Executor Unit of BLK Jakarta Pusat
- Executor Unit of BLK Jakarta Utara
- Executor Unit of Jakarta Timur
- Executor Unit of Jakarta Selatan
- Executor Unit of Jakarta Barat

17. Functional Groups
