= Pemuda Rawamangun (Transjakarta) =

Bus rapid transit station in Jakarta, Indonesia

4 05 Pemuda Rawamangun
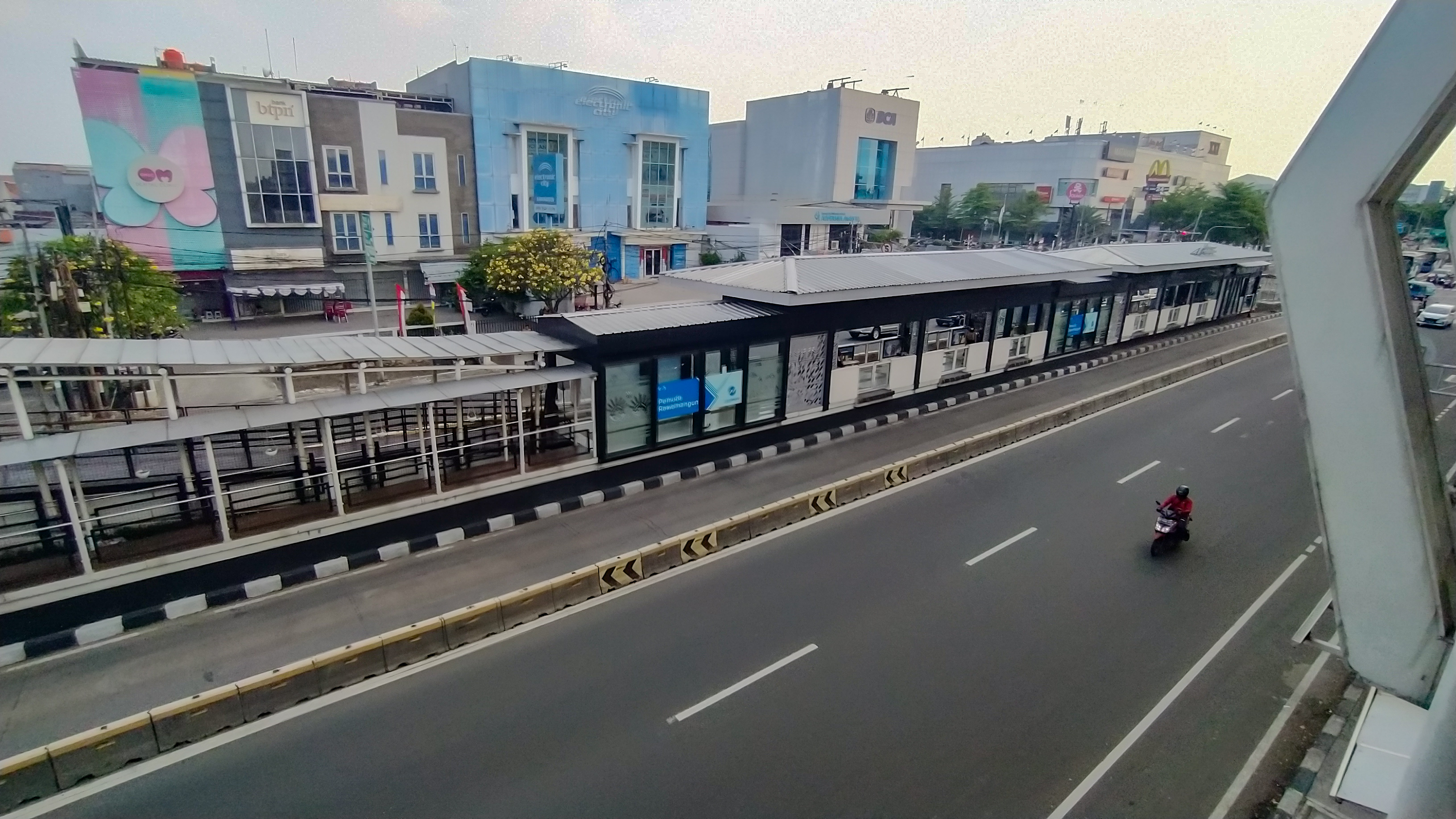
- View from the transfer bridge to the Velodrome LRT station

General information
- Location: Pemuda Street, Jati, Pulo Gadung, East Jakarta 13220, Indonesia
- Coordinates: 6.19346°S 106.89167°E
- System: Transjakarta bus rapid transit station
- Owner: Transjakarta
- Operator: Transjakarta
- Lines: List of Transjakarta corridors#Corridor 4 List of Transjakarta corridors#Cross-corridor routes
- Platforms: Single island platform
- Connections: Velodrome

Construction
- Structure type: At-grade

Other information
- Status: In service

History
- Opened: 10 September 2008
- Rebuilt: 24 July 2019; 7 years ago

Services
Preceding		Following
Layur towards Pulo Gadung	Corridor 4	Velodrome towards Galunggung
Layur towards Pulo Gadung	Corridor 4 Route 4D	Velodrome towards Patra Kuningan
Location

Pemuda Rawamangun is a Transjakarta bus rapid transit station located on Pemuda Street, Jati, Pulo Gadung, East Jakarta, Indonesia, serving Corridor 4. It is connected to the Velodrome LRT station that serves the Southern Line of the Jakarta LRT. The station is located near the Jakarta International Velodrome to the northwrst, and is named after the Pemuda Street and the area surrounding the station which is often considered part of Rawamangun.

== History ==
The station was built and began service over a year after Corridor 4 started operations, on 10 September 2008, alongside Pramuka BPKP (now Simpang Pramuka) station. The original building was medium-sized, with three gates on each side of the platform.

The station was revitalised as early as 2019 in preparation for Jakarta LRT's opening day, making it the first station to use Transjakarta's new design language. The new station is integrated with the Velodrome LRT station by a skybridge.

== Building and layout ==
The new station building features six gates on each side, and a new exit connects this BRT station to Exit B of the LRT station. It is accessible via zebra crossings to the west of the building. There are also other amenities such as a prayer room and a new accessible toilet.

North	towards Pulo Gadung (Layur) →
Island platform, doors open on the right hand side
South	← (Velodrome)	towards Galunggung and towards Patra Kuningan

== Non-BRT bus services ==
The following is the list of non-BRT bus services available outside or inside the station, last updated on 15 March 2025:

Type	Route	Destination	Notes
Transjakarta non-BRT		Bundaran Senayan—JIEP Pulo Gadung	Outside the station
Transjakarta non-BRT		Pulo Gadung Bus Terminal—Kejaksaan Agung	Outside the station
Mikrotrans Jak Lingko	JAK 17	Senen Bus Terminal–Pulo Gadung Bus Terminal via Pemuda Street	Outside the station
Mikrotrans Jak Lingko	JAK 26	Rawamangun Bus Terminal–Duren Sawit	Outside the station
Mikrotrans Jak Lingko	JAK 34	Rawamangun Bus Terminal–Klender Bus Terminal	Outside the station
Mikrotrans Jak Lingko	JAK 41	Kampung Melayu Bus Terminal–Pulo Gadung Bus Termianl	Outside the station
Mikrotrans Jak Lingko	JAK 59	Rawamangun Bus Terminal–Rawa Sengon	Outside the station

== Places of interest ==
- Jakarta International Velodrome
- Arion Mall
