= Manggarai (Transjakarta) =

Bus rapid transit station in Jakarta, Indonesia

4 14 Manggarai
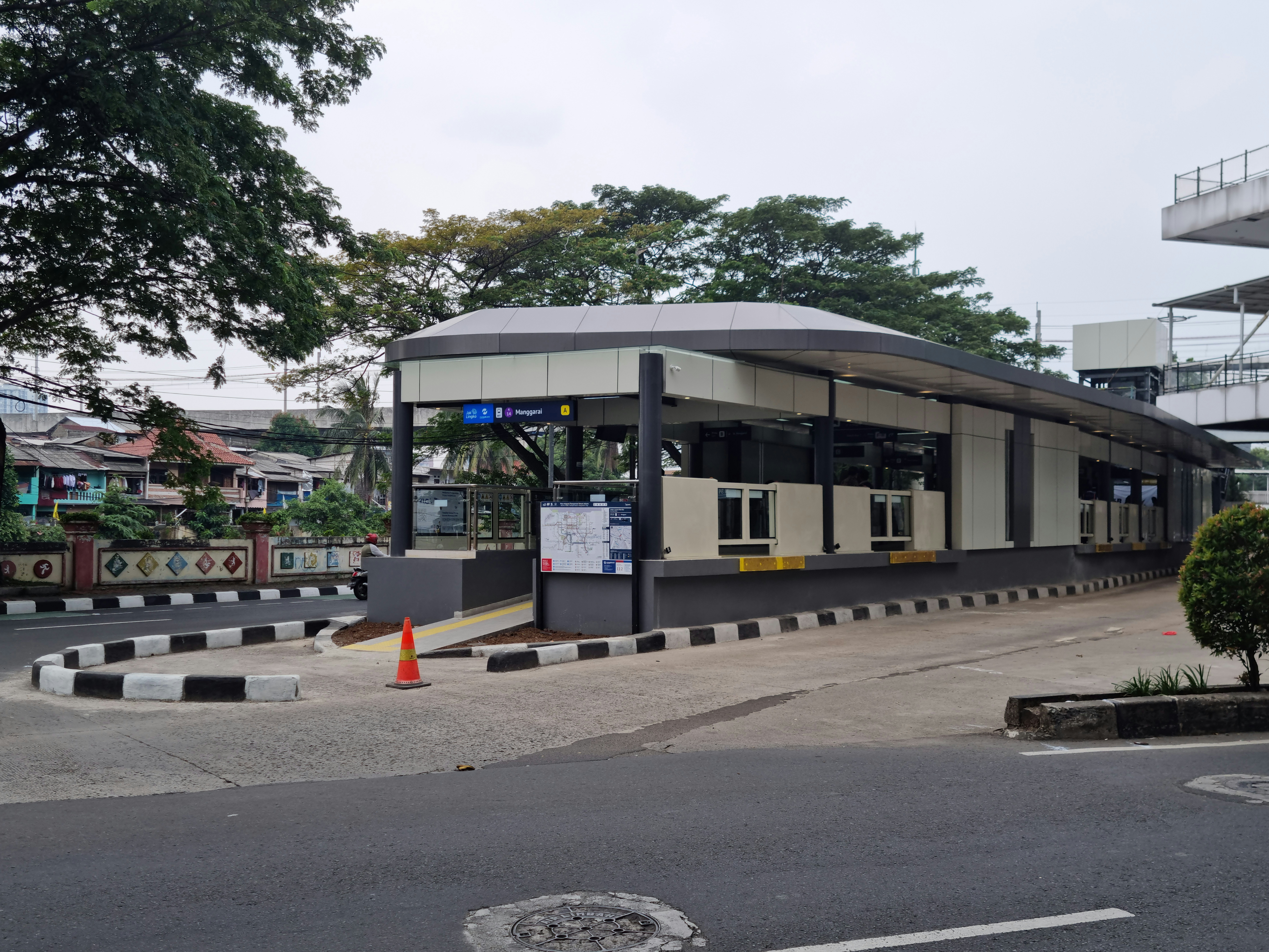
- The main building of the station, currently inactive since 6 May 2026

General information
- Location: Sultan Agung Street, Pasar Manggis, Setiabudi, South Jakarta 12970, Indonesia
- Coordinates: 6.20893°S 106.84749°E
- System: Transjakarta bus rapid transit station
- Owner: Transjakarta
- Operator: Transjakarta
- Lines: List of Transjakarta corridors#Corridor 4 List of Transjakarta corridors#Cross-corridor routes
- Platforms: Single island platform (inactive); Two temporary side platforms with separate paid area per platform (active)
- Connections: Manggarai

Construction
- Structure type: At-grade

Other information
- Status: In service with temporary buildings

History
- Opened: 24 January 2007
- Rebuilt: 24 May 2023; 3 years ago

Services
Preceding		Following
Flyover Pramuka towards Pulo Gadung	Corridor 4	Pasar Rumput One-way operation
Kesatrian One-way operation	Corridor 4	Pasar Rumput towards Galunggung
Flyover Pramuka towards Pulo Gadung	Corridor 4 Route 4D	Pasar Rumput One-way operation
Kesatrian One-way operation	Corridor 4 Route 4D	Pasar Rumput towards Patra Kuningan
Location

Manggarai is a Transjakarta bus rapid transit station located on the Sultan Agung Street in Pasar Manggis, Setiabudi, South Jakarta, Indonesia, serving Corridor 4. It is connected to the Manggarai railway station, as well as the Manggarai Bus Terminal. The station is named after the area it is located in.

Due to the Jakarta LRT construction, Manggarai BRT station is temporarily out of service and replaced by a pair of temporary road side bus shelters.

== History ==
Manggarai BRT station was opened together with the entire Corridor 4 on 27 January 2007. It is built adjacent with Manggarai Bus Terminal, terminus for some angkot, Kopaja and Metromini buses, which was known to be filthy. In 2014, the terminal was revitalised by constructing a new art deco-inspired modern building, connected with the BRT station that was left untouched from the revitalization. Public trials started on 3 March 2014.

On 5 September 2022, the station was closed for revitalisation works alongside Jembatan Gantung, PGC 1 (now Cililitan), and Pasar Kebayoran Lama (now Kebayoran) stations. Transjakarta provided shuttle service route 5ST, which serves the bus stop east of the station. Eight months later, the station reopened on 24 May 2023. The new station now has step-free access, with a ramp to Sultan Agung Street and a lift to Manggarai KRL station. It was followed by the closure of the shuttle route 5ST.

To support the construction of the Jakarta LRT extension to Manggarai, Manggarai BRT station is now temporarily closed since 6 May 2026, and all services have been transferred into a pair of temporary road side bus shelters. It was previously postponed from its original schedule on 2 May.

== Station layout ==
The following is the layout of the Manggarai station based on the BRT routes served, last updated on 27 January 2025:

North		(Flyover Pramuka) → towards Pulo Gadung
Island platform, doors open on the right
South	↪ (Pasar Rumput)	towards Galunggung and towards Patra Kuningan

Due to the temporary closure for the Jakarta LRT construction, the main building is currently inactive, and replaced by a pair of temporary bus shelters. The first shelter serves eastbound buses located south of the main building or north of the Pasaraya Manggarai shopping center, while the second one serves westbound buses located east of Pasaraya.

== Non-BRT bus services ==
Type	Route	Destination	Notes
Inner city feeder		Blok M—Manggarai Station	Inside the station
Cross-border feeder (Transjabodetabek)		Galunggung—Bekasi via Becakayu Toll Road	Inside the station
Mikrotrans Jak Lingko	JAK 86	Manggarai—Rawamangun	Outside the station

== Gallery ==
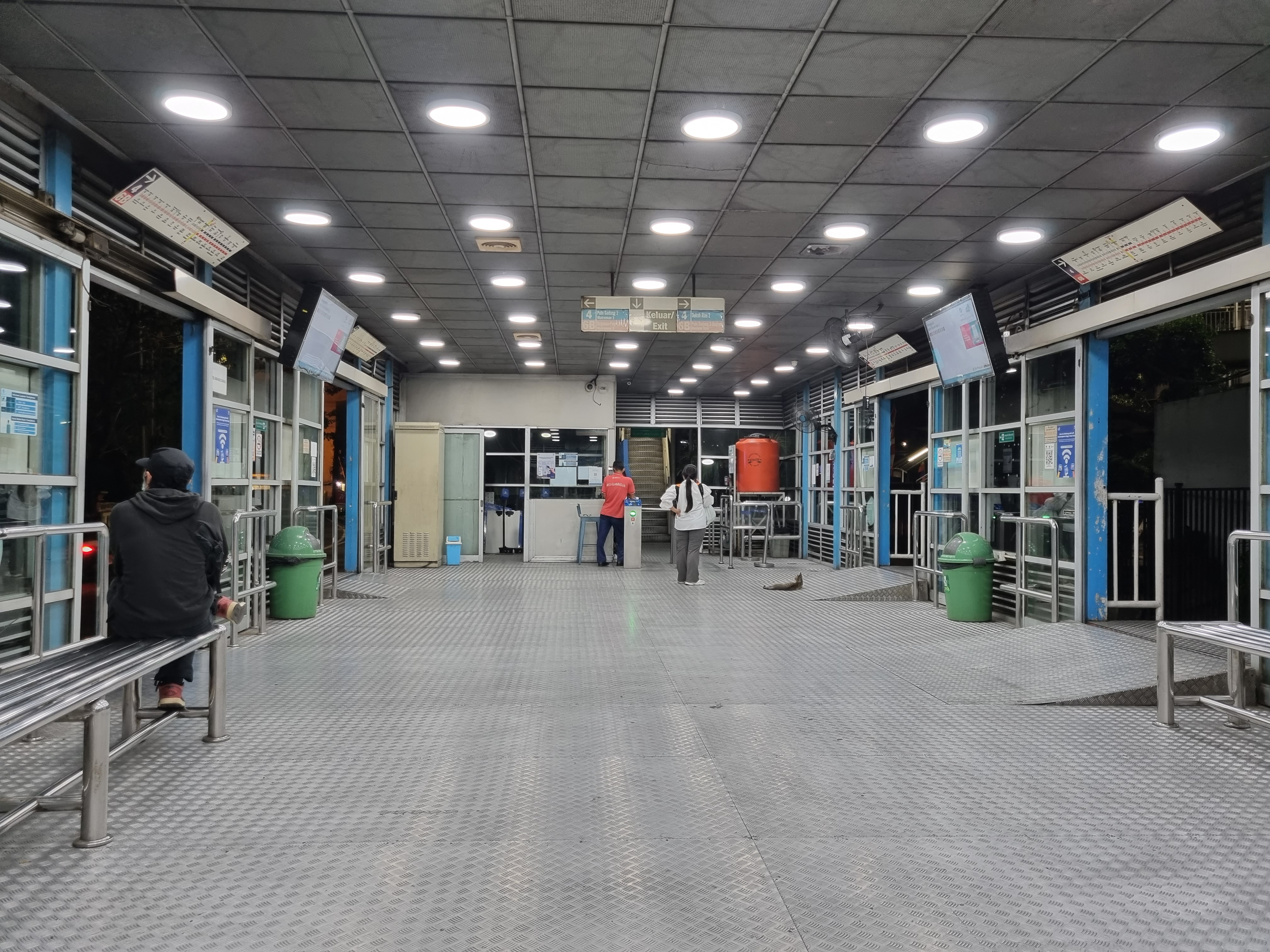
Interior of the station before revitalisation works, 2022

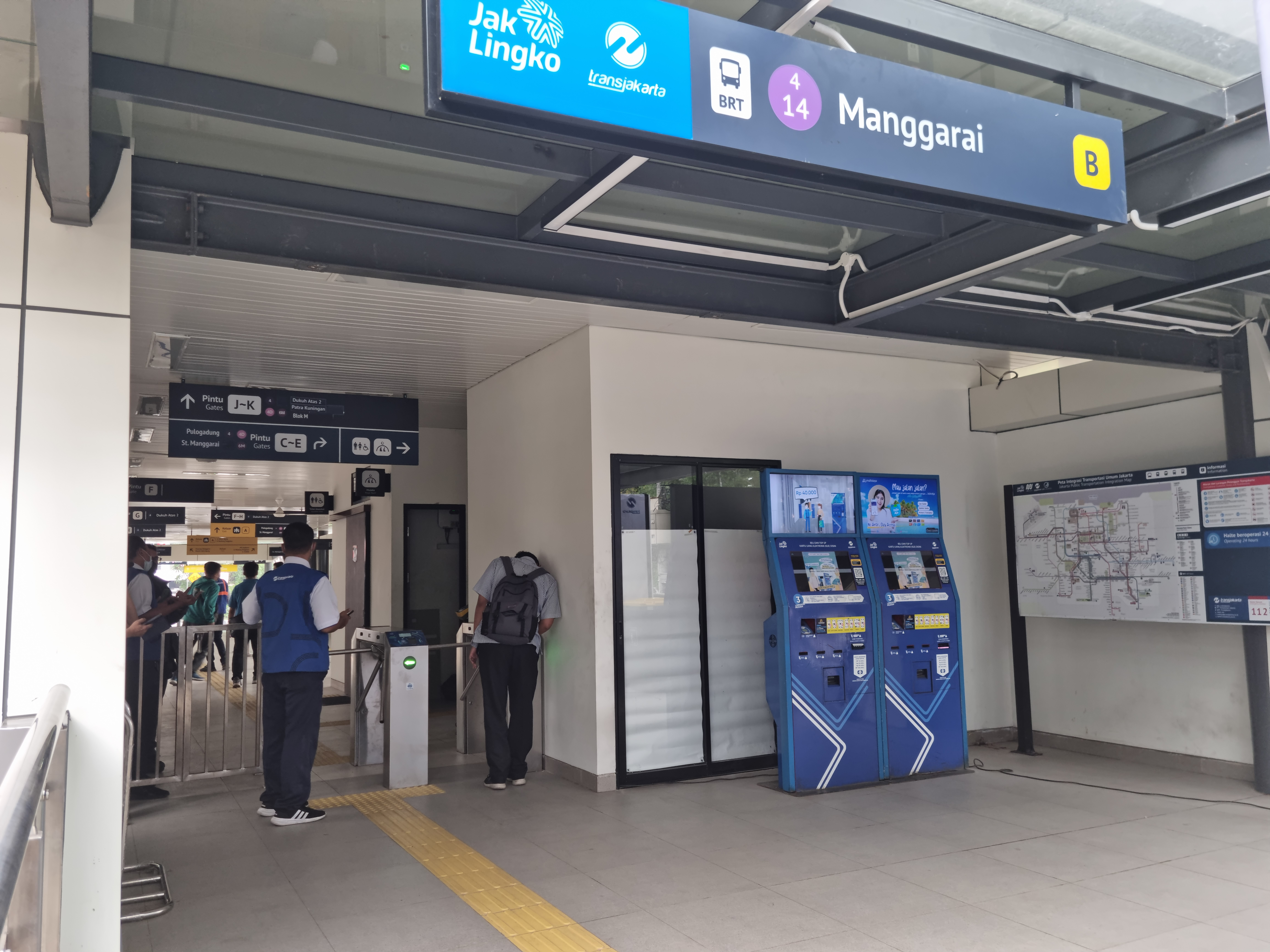
The main station entrance

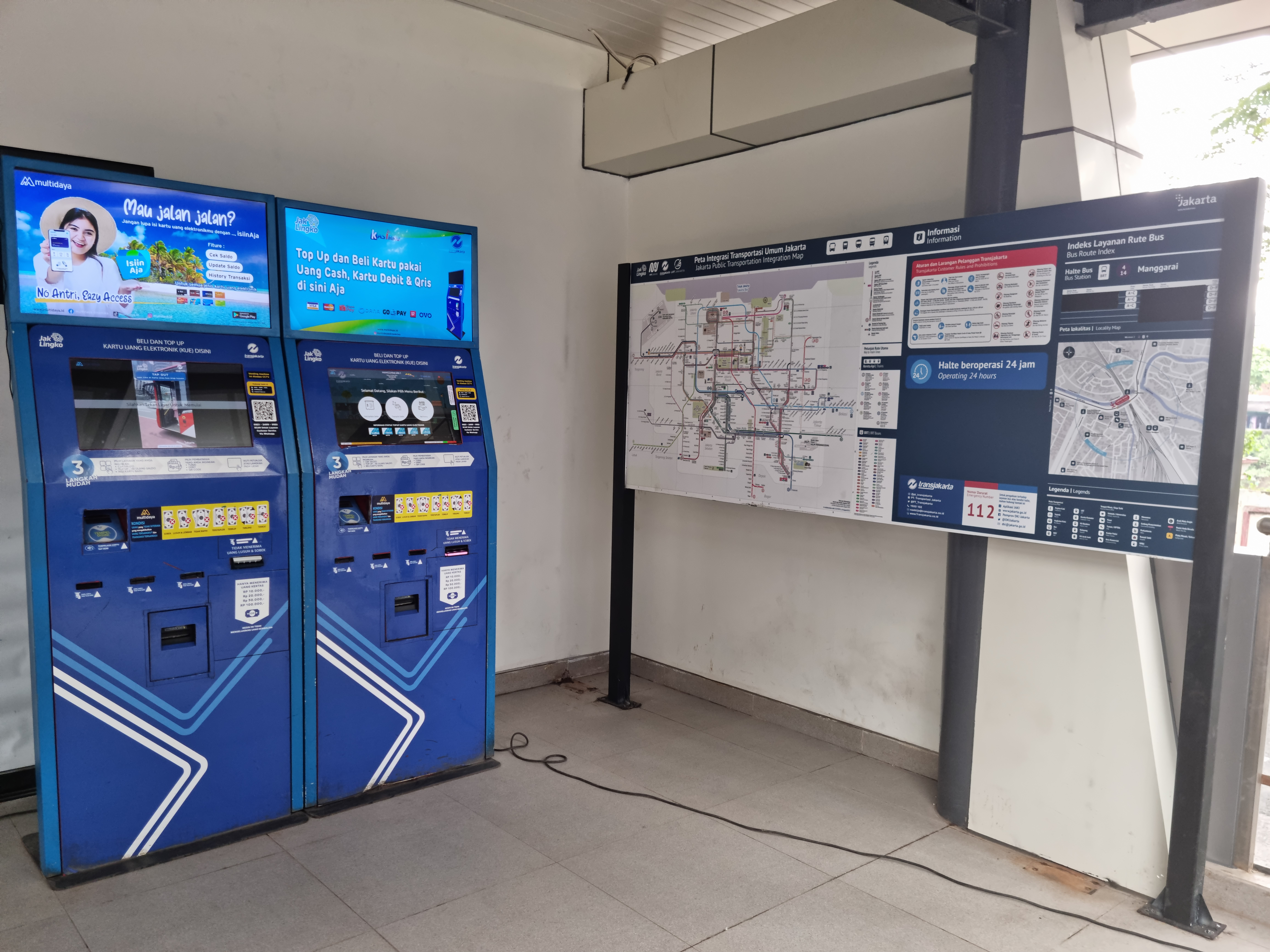
Notice board and ticket vending machines

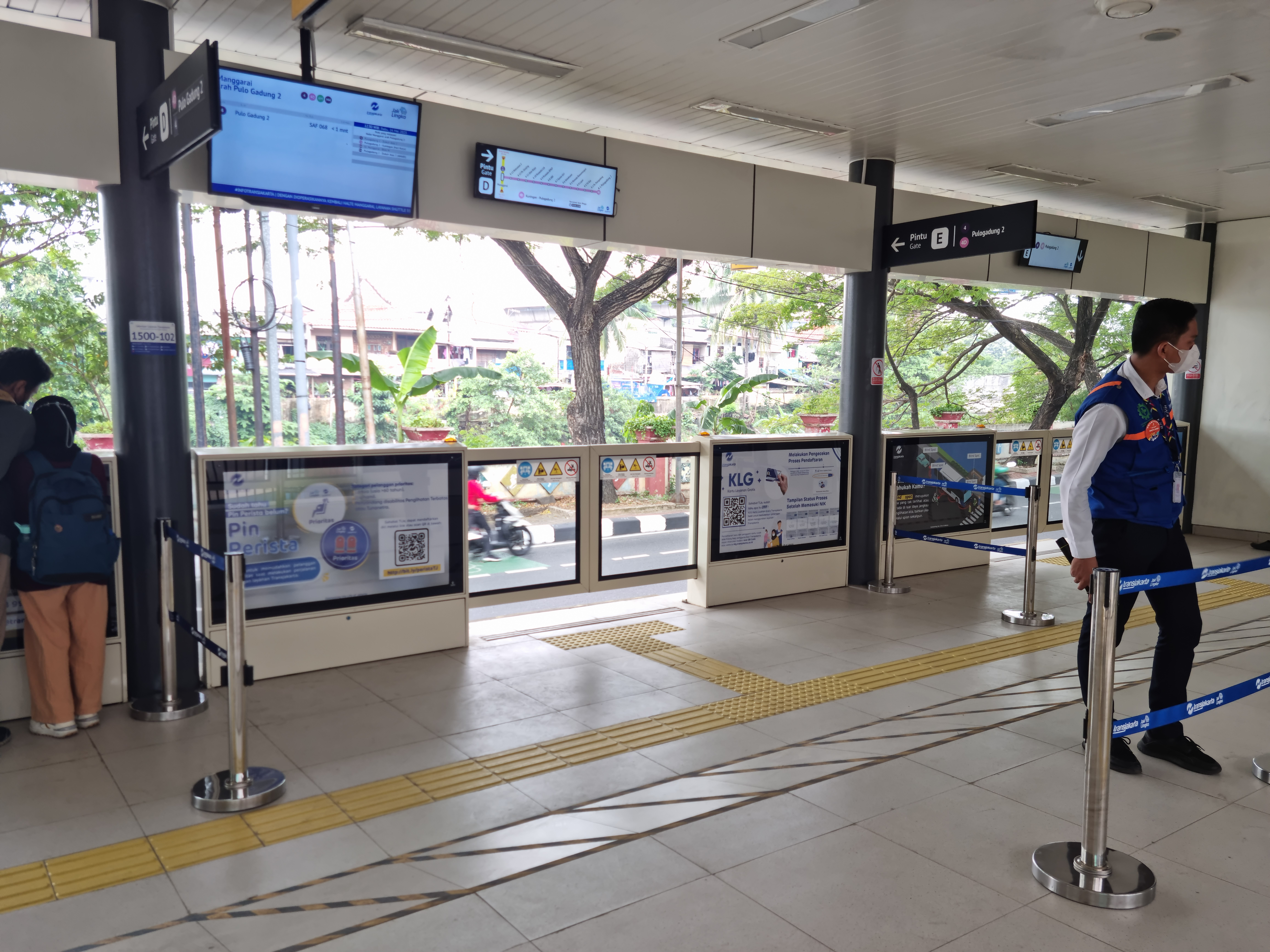
Eastbound platform towards Pulo Gadung

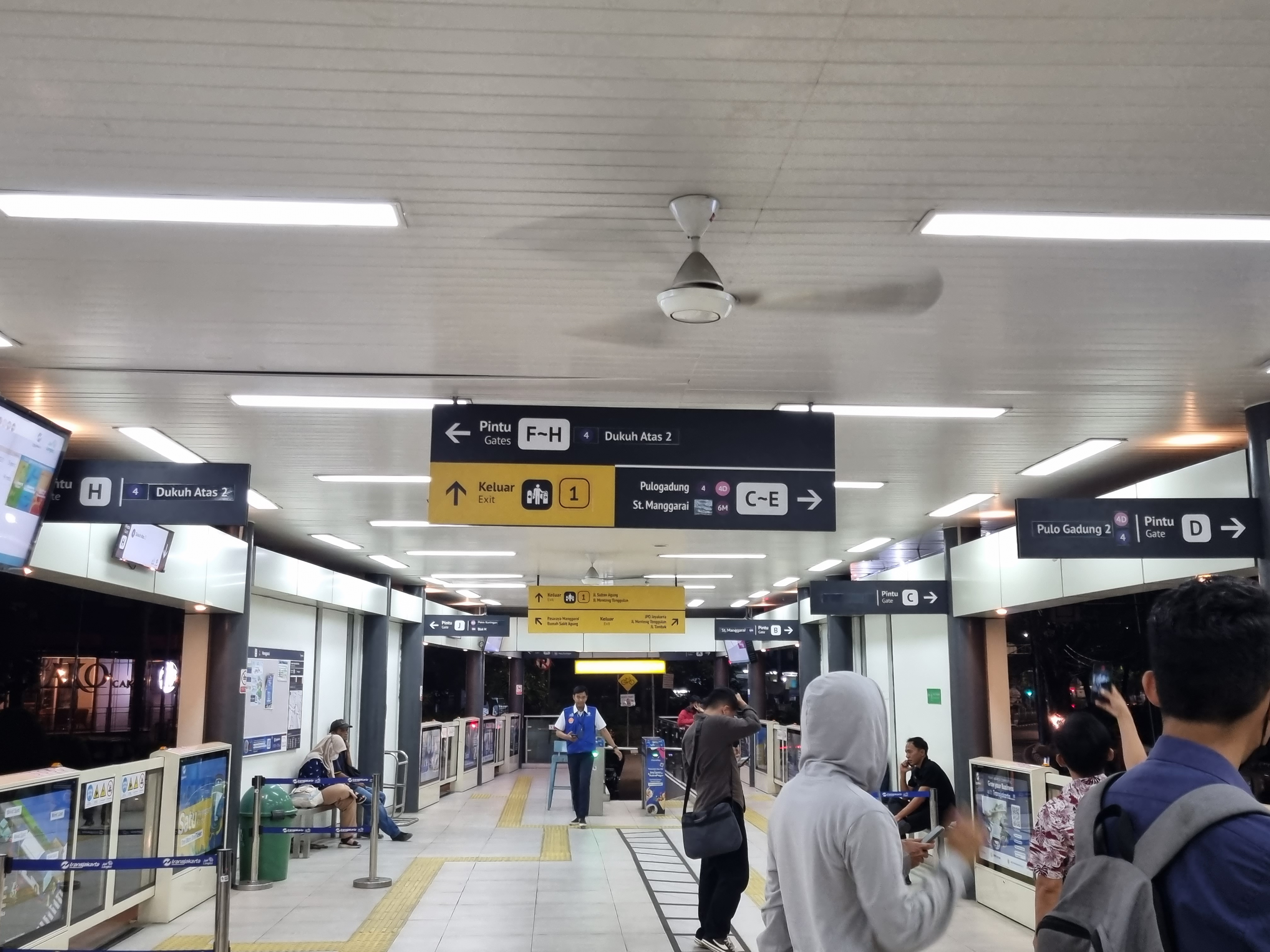
View of the platform area at night

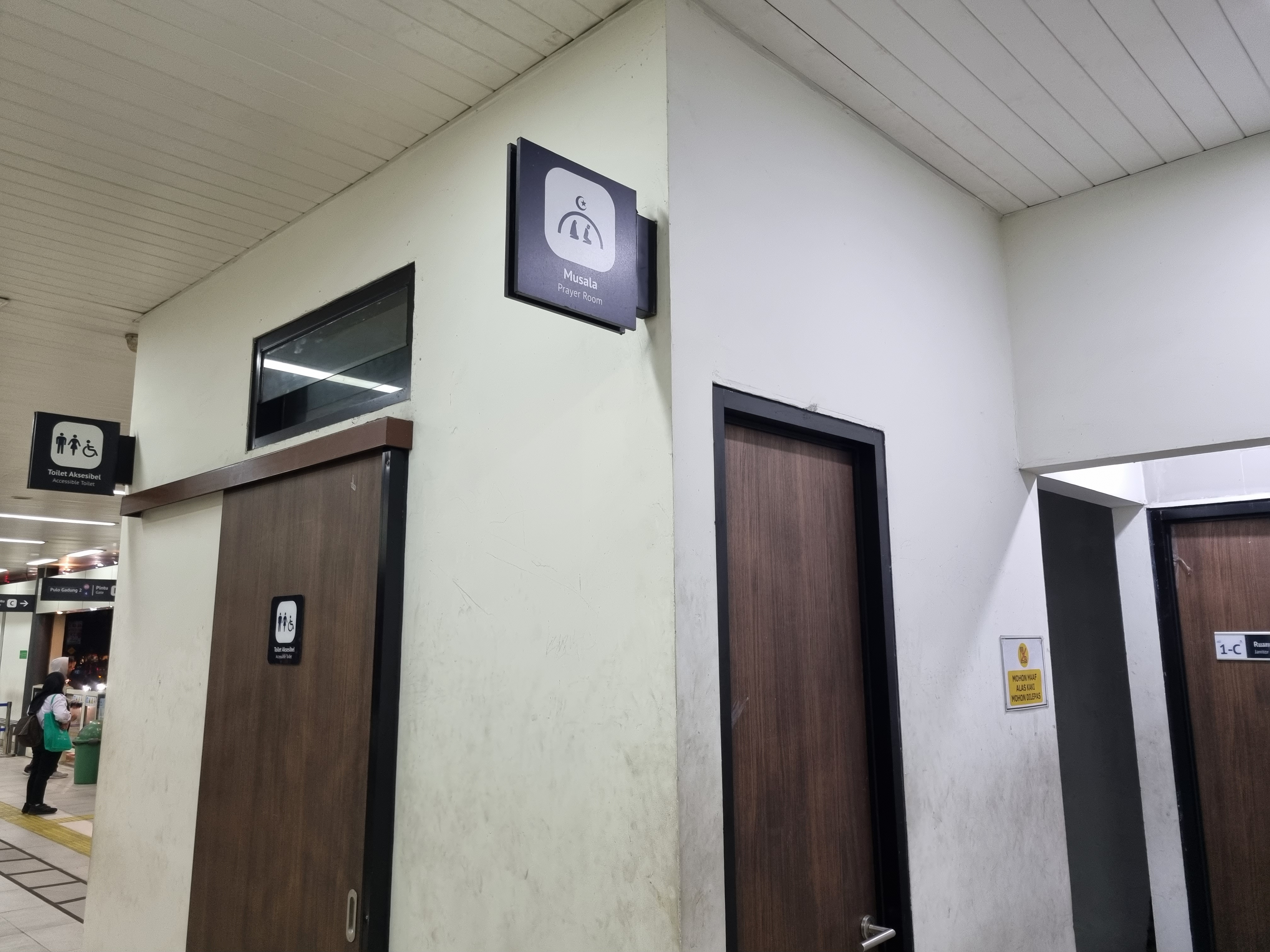
Prayer room (musala) and priority toilets

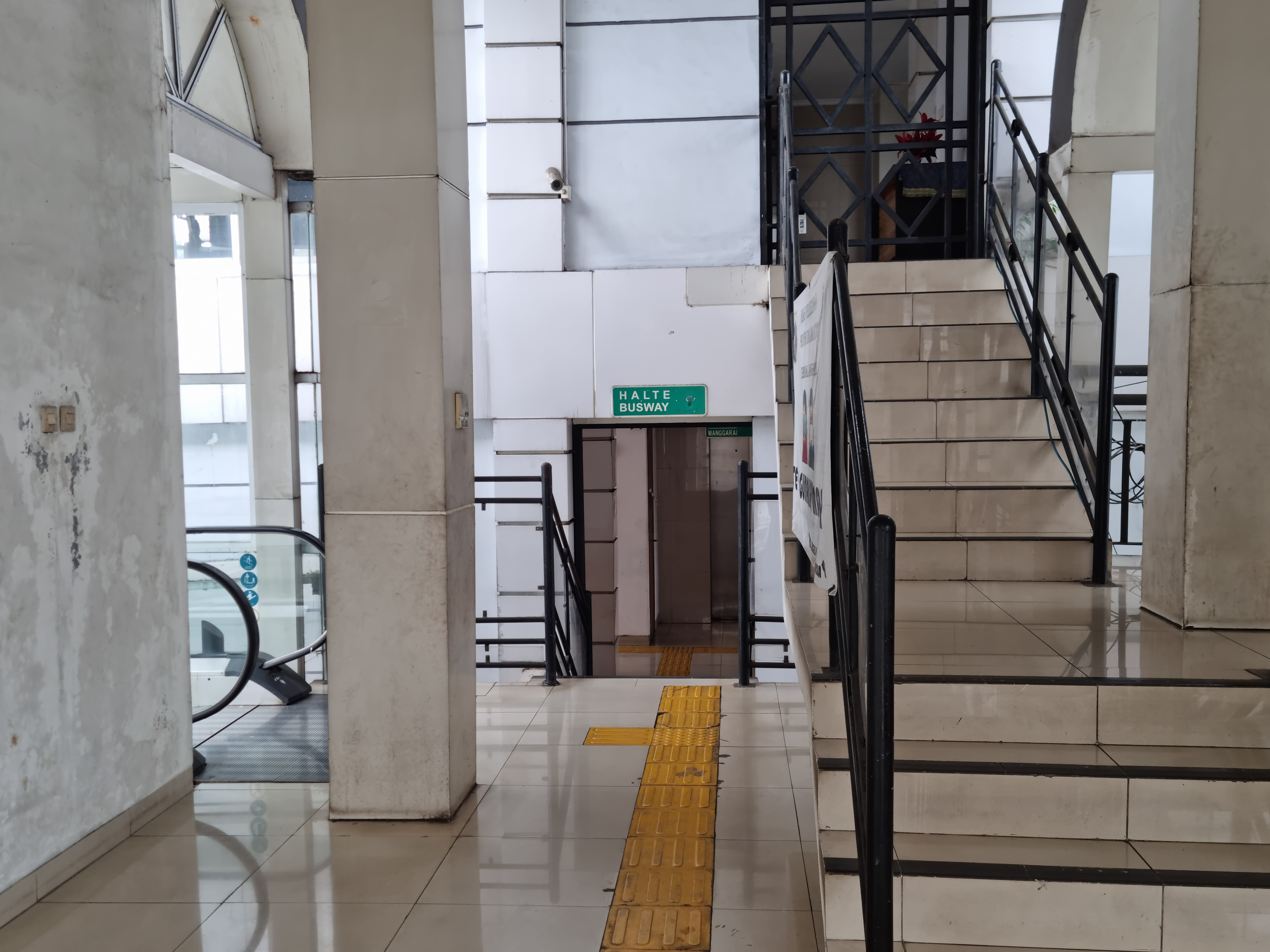
Access ramp from the bus terminal

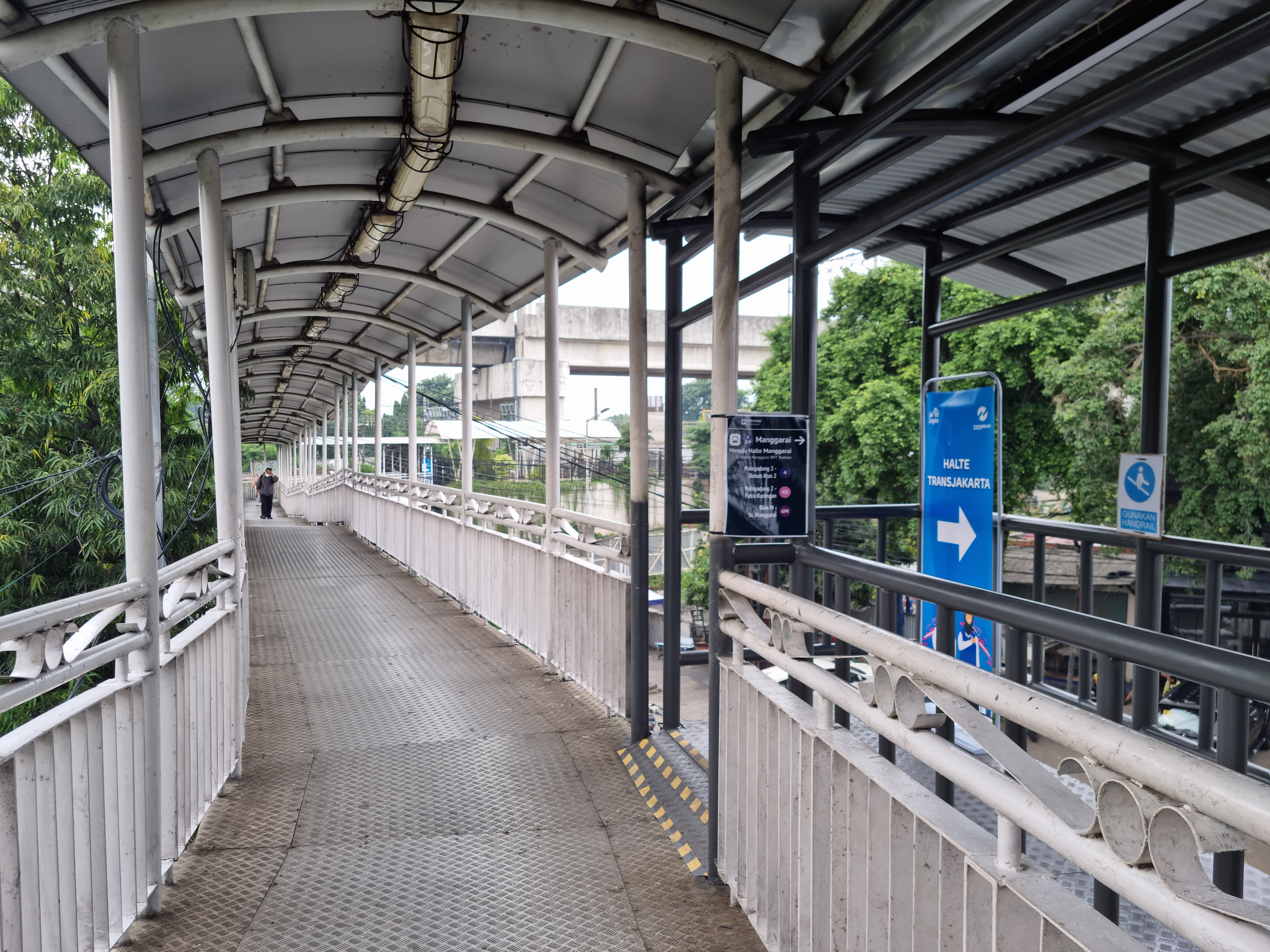
Connection skybridge to the railway station

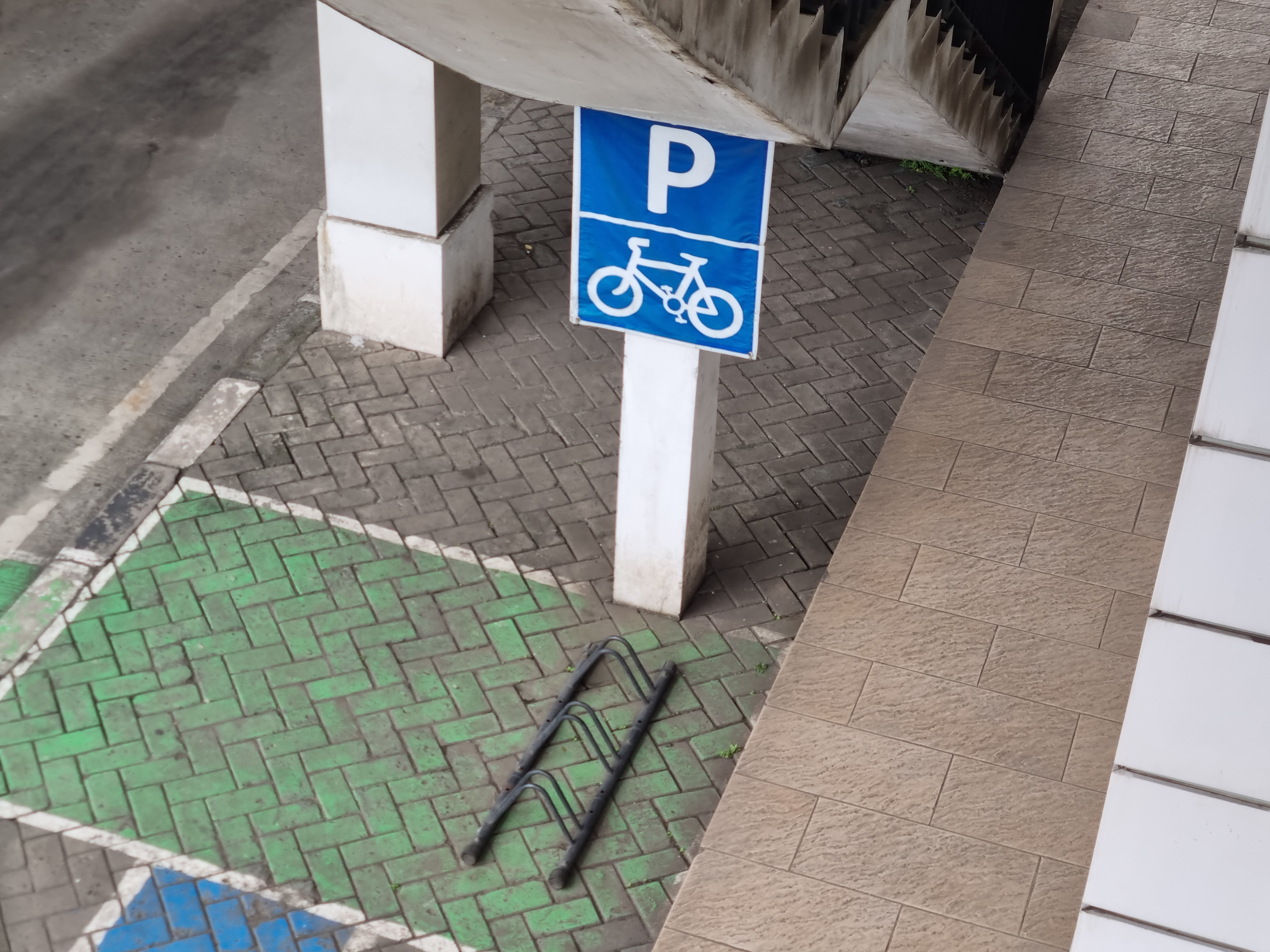
Bike park
