= Manggarai (disambiguation) =

Manggarai is an ethnic group in East Nusa Tenggara, Indonesia.

Manggarai may also refer to these Indonesia-based articles:

== Transportation ==
- Manggarai (Transjakarta), bus station in Jakarta
- Manggarai railway station, railway station in Jakarta

== Others ==
- Manggarai, Tebet, urban village in South Jakarta, Jakarta
- Manggarai language, language spoken in Flores, East Nusa Tenggara
- Manggarai Regency, regency in East Nusa Tenggara
