= Transjakarta Corridor 4 =

Bus rapid transit route in Indonesia

- Pulo Gadung – Galunggung
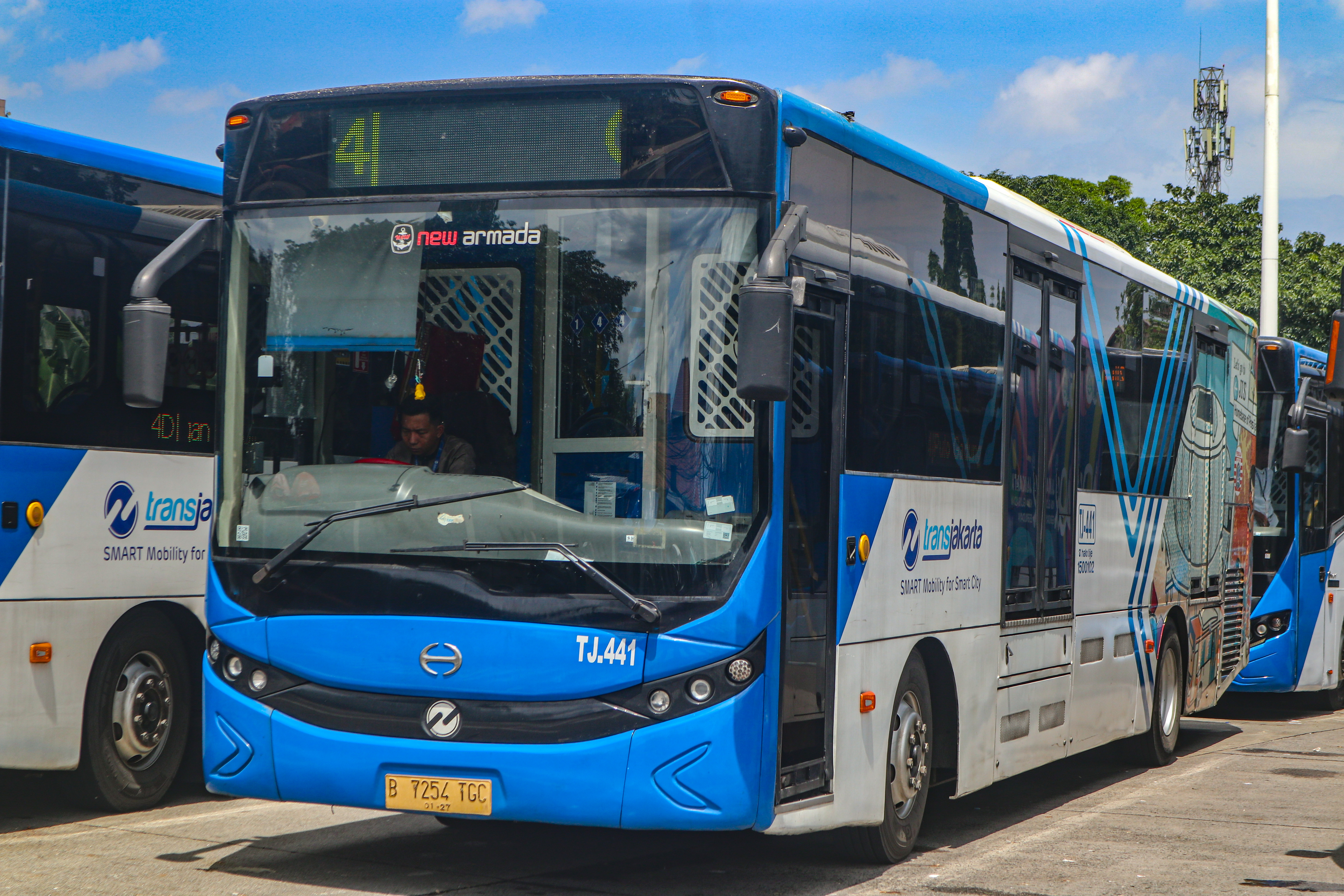
- The Hino bus fleet that serves Corridor 4 at the Pulo Gadung Bus Terminal

Overview
- System: Transjakarta
- Operator: PT. Transportasi Jakarta (TJ, infrastructures and staffs); Steady Safe (SAF, fleets and drivers); Perum DAMRI (DMR, fleets and drivers)
- Began service: January 27, 2007

Route
- Locale: East Jakarta; South Jakarta
- Length: 11.9 km
- Stations: 17

Transjakarta Corridor 4 is a bus rapid transit corridor in Jakarta, Indonesia, operated by Transjakarta. It runs from the Pulo Gadung Bus Terminal in East Jakarta to the Galunggung BRT station in the Dukuh Atas TOD area.

The original route passes through Bekasi Raya, Pemuda, Pramuka, Tambak, Sultan Agung, and Galunggung Streets. Currently, buses are temporarily rerouted from Tambak Street to Matraman Raya (running parallel to Corridor 5), Slamet Riyadi, and Manggarai Utara 1 and 2 Streets, due to congestion on Tambak Street caused by the construction of Phase 1B of the Jakarta LRT.

This route is integrated with the Cikarang Loop Line of the KRL Commuterline at Sudirman Station via the Galunggung BRT station, and Manggarai Station—which serves the Bogor Line, the Cikarang Loop Line, and the Airport Rail Link—via the Manggarai BRT station. KRL Commuterline passengers travelling to Rawamangun and Pulo Gadung can alight at Sudirman Station and continue their journey using Corridor 4 from the Galunggung, Manggarai, or Pasar Genjing BRT stations.This corridor is also integrated with the Jakarta LRT at Velodrome LRT station via the Pemuda Rawamangun BRT station.

== History ==
Trial runs for Corridors 4, 5, 6, and 7 were conducted in December 2006. All four corridors were inaugurated by then Governor of Jakarta, Sutiyoso, on January 27, 2007.

From January 16, 2020 to May 19, 2023, Corridor 4 was temporarily extended to the Tosari BRT station on Corridor 1, due to the construction of the Dukuh Atas BNI LRT station which required the relocation of the Dukuh Atas 2 BRT station (now known as Galunggung) to a temporary structure. Following the completion of the LRT construction works, Corridor 4 returned to its original terminus at Dukuh Atas 2 (Galunggung) on May 20, 2023.

=== Temporary readjusment ===
Starting from October 8, 2024, the Flyover Pramuka–Manggarai section in both directions, which originally passed along Tambak Street, was temporarily rerouted via Matraman Raya, Slamet Riyadi, and Manggarai Utara 1 and 2 Streets. This adjustment was made due to congestion on Tambak Street caused by the construction of Phase 1B of the Jakarta LRT. As the adjusted route overlaps with Corridor 5 along Matraman Raya Street, Tegalan and Kesatrian BRT stations of Corridor 5 also began serving westbound Corridor 4 buses towards Galunggung.

== List of BRT stations ==
- Due to the construction of Phase 1B of the Jakarta LRT on Tambak Street, Corridor 4 is temporarily rerouted via Matraman Raya (running along Corridor 5), Slamet Riyadi, and Manggarai Utara 1 and 2 Streets since October 8, 2024. As part of this adjusment, the original Pasar Genjing station is temporarily out of service and buses instead serve bus stops on the sidewalks. At Simpang Pramuka station, transfer access from and to Corridor 10 is only available for passengers boarding to or alighting from westbound buses towards Galunggung. Westbound Corridor 4 buses towards Galunggung also serve Corridor 5's Tegalan and Kesatrian BRT stations.
- All stations, except Velodrome, Kayu Jati, and Rawamangun, are served by buses 24 hours a day. These three stations currently only open from 05:00 to 22:00, as the late-night AMARI service is being temporarily rerouted via Kayu Manis, Perintis Kemerdekaan, and Jend. Ahmad Yani Streets since October 8, 2024.
- Stations indicated by a → sign have a one-way service towards Galunggung only.

Corridor 4 (Pulo Gadung – Galunggung)
Code	Station name	Transfer/Notes	Bus terminal or train station nearby
Stations in order: From top to bottom (downwards) towards Galunggung (→); from bottom to top (upwards) towards Pulo Gadung (←)
4 01 2 01	Pulo Gadung	Pulo Gadung	Pulo Gadung Bus Terminal
4 02	Pasar Pulo Gadung	Pasar Pulo Gadung	
4 03	Pemuda Merdeka	Pemuda Merdeka	Pulo Gadung (Planned)
4 04	Layur	Layur	Pemuda (Planned)
4 05	Pemuda Rawamangun	Pemuda Rawamangun	Velodrome (via skybridge); Rawamangun Bus Terminal
4 06	Velodrome	No AMARI service temporarily	
4 06	Velodrome	Velodrome	
4 07	Kayu Jati	No AMARI service temporarily	Rawamangun
4 07	Kayu Jati	Kayu Jati	Rawamangun
4 08	Rawamangun	No AMARI service temporarily	
4 08	Rawamangun	Rawamangun	
4 09	Simpang Pramuka	Two separate buildings for opposing directions require exiting paid area to transfer: Simpang Pramuka 1: Towards Pulo Gadung (←); Original station: Towards Galunggung (→)	Pramuka (U/C)
4 09	Simpang Pramuka	Simpang Pramuka Pemuda Pramuka (via skybridge, temporarily only available for passengers from westbound buses)	Pramuka (U/C)
4 10	Pramuka Sari	Pramuka Sari	
4 11	Utan Kayu Rawamangun	Utan Kayu	
4 12	Pasar Genjing	Two separate buildings for opposing directions require exiting paid area to transfer: Eastbound: Towards Pulo Gadung (←); Westbound: Towards Galunggung (→)	Kramat Matraman (U/C)
4 12	Pasar Genjing	Pasar Genjing	Kramat Matraman (U/C)
4 13	Flyover Pramuka	Flyover Pramuka Matraman (via skybridge)	
5 13	Tegalan →	Tegalan	
5 14	Kesatrian →	Kesatrian	
Towards Pulo Gadung (←) heads straight to Flyover Pramuka
4 14	Manggarai	Temporarily out of service due to the Jakarta LRT construction, currently served by temporary road-side bus shelters.	Manggarai Manggarai Bus Terminal Manggarai (U/C)
4 14	Manggarai	Manggarai	Manggarai Manggarai Bus Terminal Manggarai (U/C)
4 15	Pasar Rumput	Pasar Rumput	
4 16	Halimun	Halimun	
4 17 6 19	Galunggung	Galunggung Dukuh Atas (via skybridge)	Sudirman Dukuh Atas BNI BNI City Dukuh Atas BNI Dukuh Atas (Planned)

== Cross-corridor route ==
=== Route 4D (Pulo Gadung – Patra Kuningan) ===
- Due to the construction of Phase 1B of the Jakarta LRT on Tambak Street, service 4D is temporarily rerouted via Matraman Raya (running along Corridor 5), Slamet Riyadi, and Manggarai Utara 1 and 2 Streets since October 8, 2024. As part of this adjusment, the original Pasar Genjing station is temporarily out of service and buses instead serve bus stops on the sidewalks. At Simpang Pramuka station, transfer access from and to Corridor 10 is only available for passengers boarding to or alighting from westbound buses towards Patra Kuningan. Westbound service 4D buses towards Patra Kuningan also serve Corridor 5's Tegalan and Kesatrian BRT stations.
- Stations indicated by a ← sign have a one-way service towards Pulo Gadung only. Stations indicated by a → sign have a one-way service towards Patra Kuningan only.

Route 4D (Pulo Gadung – Patra Kuningan)
Code	Station name	Transfer/Notes	Bus terminal or train station nearby
Stations in order: From top to bottom (downwards) towards Patra Kuningan (→); from bottom to top (upwards) towards Pulo Gadung (←)
4 01 2 01	Pulo Gadung	Pulo Gadung	Pulo Gadung Bus Terminal
4 02	Pasar Pulo Gadung	Pasar Pulo Gadung	
4 03	Pemuda Merdeka	Pemuda Merdeka	Pulo Gadung (Planned)
4 04	Layur	Layur	Pemuda (Planned)
4 05	Pemuda Rawamangun	Pemuda Rawamangun	Velodrome (via skybridge) Rawamangun Bus Terminal
4 06	Velodrome	Velodrome	
4 07	Kayu Jati	Kayu Jati	Rawamangun
4 08	Rawamangun	Rawamangun	
4 09	Simpang Pramuka	Two separate buildings for opposing directions require exiting paid area to transfer: Simpang Pramuka 1: Towards Pulo Gadung (←); Original station: Towards Patra Kuningan (→)	Pramuka (U/C)
4 09	Simpang Pramuka	Simpang Pramuka Pemuda Pramuka (via skybridge, temporarily only available for passengers from westbound buses)	Pramuka (U/C)
4 10	Pramuka Sari	Pramuka Sari	
4 11	Utan Kayu	Utan Kayu	
4 12	Pasar Genjing	Two separate buildings for opposing directions require exiting paid area to transfer: Eastbound: Towards Pulo Gadung (←); Westbound: Towards Patra Kuningan (→)	Kramat Matraman (U/C)
4 12	Pasar Genjing	Pasar Genjing	Kramat Matraman (U/C)
4 13	Flyover Pramuka	Flyover Pramuka Matraman (via skybridge)	
5 13	Tegalan →	Tegalan	
5 14	Kesatrian →	Kesatrian	
Towards Pulo Gadung (←) heads straight to Flyover Pramuka
4 14	Manggarai	Temporarily out of service due to the Jakarta LRT construction, currently served by temporary road-side bus shelters.	Manggarai Manggarai Bus Terminal Manggarai (U/C)
4 14	Manggarai	Manggarai	Manggarai Manggarai Bus Terminal Manggarai (U/C)
4 15	Pasar Rumput	Pasar Rumput	
4 16	Halimun	Halimun	
6 17	Setiabudi Integritas →	Setiabudi Integritas	Setiabudi
Towards Pulo Gadung (←) heads straight to Halimun
6 16	Kuningan Madya	Kuningan Madya	
6 15	Karet Kuningan	Karet Kuningan	
6 14	Rasuna Said	Rasuna Said	Rasuna Said
6 13	Kuningan	Kuningan	Kuningan
6 12	Patra Kuningan	Patra Kuningan	

== Special route ==
=== Route 4H (Pulo Gadung – Ragunan) ===
- Only operates during holiday seasons, such as Eid al-Fitr and Christmas holidays. The route is currently inactive.
- Stations indicated by ← sign have a one-way service towards Pulo Gadung only. Stations indicated by a → sign have a one-way service towards Ragunan only.

Route 4H (Pulo Gadung – Ragunan)
Code	Station name	Transfer/Notes	Bus terminal or train station nearby
Stations in order: From top to bottom (downwards) towards Ragunan (→); from bottom to top (upwards) towards Pulo Gadung (←)
4 01 2 01	Pulo Gadung	Pulo Gadung	Pulo Gadung Bus Terminal
4 02	Pasar Pulo Gadung	Pasar Pulo Gadung	
4 03	Pemuda Merdeka	Pemuda Merdeka	Pulo Gadung (Planned)
4 04	Layur	Layur	Pemuda (Planned)
4 05	Pemuda Rawamangun	Pemuda Rawamangun	Velodrome (via skybridge) Rawamangun Bus Terminal
4 06	Velodrome	Velodrome	
4 07	Kayu Jati	Kayu Jati	Rawamangun
4 08	Rawamangun	Rawamangun	
4 09	Simpang Pramuka	Simpang Pramuka Pemuda Pramuka (via skybridge)	Pramuka (U/C)
4 10	Pramuka Sari	Pramuka Sari	
4 11	Utan Kayu	Utan Kayu	
4 12	Pasar Genjing	Pasar Genjing	Kramat Matraman (U/C)
4 13	Flyover Pramuka	Flyover Pramuka Matraman (via skybridge)	
4 14	Manggarai	Temporarily out of service due to the Jakarta LRT construction, currently served by temporary road-side bus shelters.	Manggarai Manggarai Bus Terminal Manggarai (U/C)
4 14	Manggarai	Manggarai	Manggarai Manggarai Bus Terminal Manggarai (U/C)
4 15	Pasar Rumput	Pasar Rumput	
4 16	Halimun →	Halimun	
Towards Ragunan (→) heads straight to Setiabudi
Towards Pulo Gadung (←) heads straight to Pasar Rumput
6 18	Flyover Kuningan ←	Flyover Kuningan	
6 17	Setiabudi Integritas	Setiabudi Integritas	Setiabudi
6 16	Kuningan Madya	Kuningan Madya	
6 15	Karet Kuningan	Karet Kuningan	
6 14	Rasuna Said	Rasuna Said	Rasuna Said
6 13	Kuningan	Kuningan	Kuningan
6 12	Patra Kuningan	Patra Kuningan	
6 11	Underpass Kuningan	Underpass Kuningan Simpang Kuningan (via skybridge)	
6 10	Mampang Prapatan	Mampang Prapatan	
6 09	Duren Tiga	Duren Tiga	
6 08	Warung Buncit	Warung Buncit	
6 07	Warung Jati	Warung Jati	
6 06	Buncit Indah	Buncit Indah	
6 05	Pejaten	Pejaten	
6 04	Jati Padang	Jati Padang	
6 03	Jati Barat	Jati Barat	
6 02	Simpang Ragunan Ar-Raudhah	Simpang Ragunan Ar-Raudhah	Warung Jati (planned)
6 01	Ragunan	Ragunan	Ragunan Bus Terminal

== Fleets ==
Information correct as of May 2026

=== (Pulo Gadung - Galunggung) ===
Operator	Type	Caption	Image	Depot
Main BRT fleet
Perum DAMRI	Skywell NJL6126BEV	Operates every day on 24 hours		Cakung
Perum DAMRI	Zhongtong Bus N12	Operates every day (05:00–22:00 WIB)		Klender
Steady Safe	Volvo B11R	Operates every day (05:00–22:00 WIB)		Klender
Reserve BRT fleet
Swakelola Transjakarta	Hino RK1 JSNL	Operates on weekdays (05:00–22:00 WIB)		Rawa Buaya
Swakelola Transjakarta	Hino RK1 JSNL	Operates on weekdays (05:00–22:00 WIB)		Kayu Putih
Swakelola Transjakarta	Mercedes-Benz OC 500	Operates on weekdays (05:00–22:00 WIB)		Cawang

=== (Pulo Gadung - Patra Kuningan) ===
Operator	Type	Caption	Image	Depot
Main BRT fleet
Perum DAMRI	Skywell NJL6126BEV	Operates every day (05:00–22:00 WIB)		Cakung
Perum DAMRI	Zhongtong Bus N12	Operates every day (05:00–22:00 WIB)		Klender
Reserve BRT fleet
Swakelola Transjakarta	Hino RK1 JSNL	Operates on weekdays (05:00–22:00 WIB)		Rawa Buaya
Swakelola Transjakarta	Hino RK1 JSNL	Operates on weekdays (05:00–22:00 WIB)		Kayu Putih
Swakelola Transjakarta	Mercedes-Benz OH 1626	Operates on weekdays (05:00–22:00 WIB)		Cawang

== See also ==
- Transjakarta
  - List of Transjakarta corridors
