= Pulo Gadung =

Coordinates: 6°11′40.56″S 106°53′19.32″E

District of Pulo Gadung Kecamatan Pulo Gadung
- District
- Country: Indonesia
- Province: DKI Jakarta
- City: East Jakarta

Pulo Gadung is an administrative district (kecamatan) of the administrative city East Jakarta, Indonesia and situated on the northern edge of the city. It covers an area of 4.88 km^{2} (1,206 acres), and is bounded by Kelapa Gading District of North Jakarta to the north, Cakung District to the east, Jatinegara District and Duren Sawit District to the south, and Matraman District and Cempaka Putih District of Central Jakarta to the west.

The district is currently divided into seven administrative villages. As of 2024, Pulo Gadung had an area of 15.55 km2 and a population of 309,037 (comprising 153,755 males and 155,282 females); giving a population density of 20,733 people per km2 (53,712 people per sq mi). Known for its industrial areas and bustling inter-city terminal, Pulo Gadung is a significant economic hub within East Jakarta.

All districts, click to expand

== History ==
A Dutch East India Company record from 1675 first mentioned this area, with its earliest spelling Poelo Gadongh, as plantation land managed by a Javanese man named Soeta Annem. In 1790, this plantation land was owned by Martinus Jacobus Balje, a landowner and member of the Batavia city council, who held a market there every Friday. During Governor-General Daendels' administration (1808-1811), a well-maintained road passable by carriages already ran through this area, connecting Tjilintjing (now Cilincing District) to Meester Cornelis (now Jatinegara District).

After Indonesia's independence, Pulo Gadung officially became a district based on Government Regulation No. 25 of 1978 concerning the formation of city and district territories within the Special Capital Region of Jakarta. The area was initially known for its production of various household furniture. Since the 1970s, the district developed significantly with many factories and an industrial estate, with an intercity bus terminal serving as its supporting infrastructure.

The name Pulo Gadung itself comes from the combination of the word pulo, meaning island or land by the river, and the word gadung (Dioscorea hispida), which refers to a type of yam that once grew abundantly in the area.

== Kelurahan (administrative villages) ==
It is divided into seven administrative villages (kelurahan), listed below with their areas, populations (as of 2024), and post codes.

Area code	Name of Kelurahan	Area in sq. km	Pop'n 2022	Postal code
31.75.02.1006	Kayu Putih	4.37	50,154	13210
31.75.02.1007	Jati	1.10	39,768	13220
31.75.02.1005	Rawamangun	2.60	46,055	13220
31.75.02.1002	Pisangan Timur	1.79	50,678	13230
31.75.02.1004	Jatinegara Kaum	1.24	31,435	13240
31.75.02.1003	Cipinang	1.53	48,196	13250
31.75.02.1001	Pulo Gadung	1.92	42,751	13260
31.75.02	Totals	15.55	309,037	

== List of important places ==
- Cipinang Penitentiary Institution
- Jakarta International Velodrome
- Jakarta International Equestrian Park
- Jakarta State University
- Klender railway station
- Pulogadung Terminal
- Jakarta Industrial Estate Pulogadung
- Indonesia International Institute for Life Sciences (i3L)
