= Indonesia International Institute for Life Sciences =

Private university in Indonesia

i3L University (formerly known as Indonesia International Institute for Life Science)
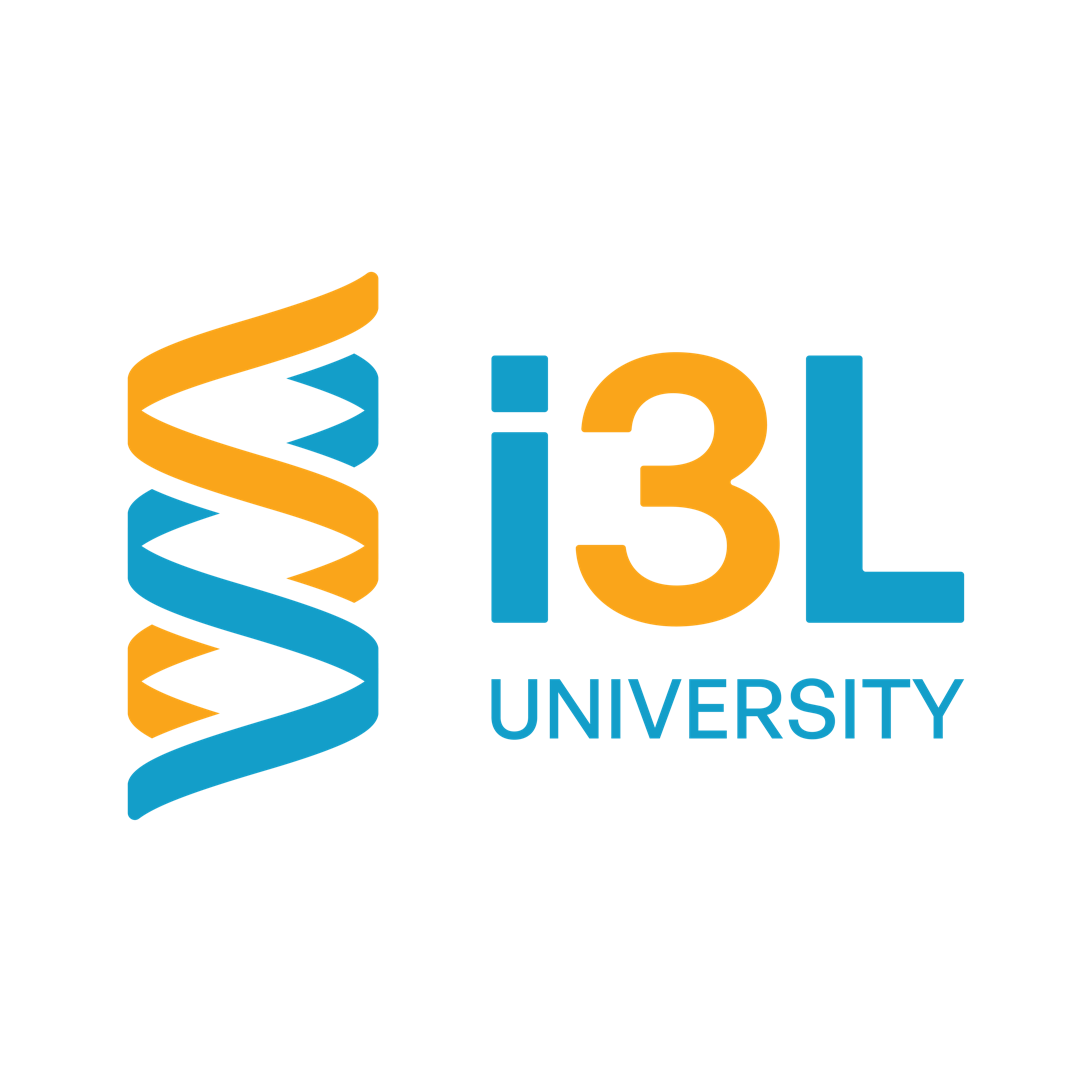
- Other name: i3L University
- Motto: Integrate, Innovate, Impact
- Type: Private institution
- Established: 2014
- Rector: Katherine, S.T., Ph.D.
- Location: Jakarta, Indonesia; 6.1792°S 106.8780°E
- Website: www.i3L.ac.id

i3L University formerly known as Indonesia International Institute for Life Sciences (in Indonesia: link Institut Bio Scientia Indonesia), is a private university in Indonesia. The main campus of the university is at Jakarta. The campus was established with collaboration of Karolinska Institute and Swedish University of Agricultural Sciences.

The university has two faculties; School of Health and Life Sciences (SHLS), and School of Business Management (SBM). It has currently expanded to delivers seven bachelor's degree programs (five in School of Life Sciences and two in School of Business), one master's degree program, and one professional program.

== Academic Faculties ==
The university has two faculties to support both research and teaching activities.

=== Faculty of Life Sciences ===
- Biomedicine
- Biotechnology
- Food Science and Nutrition
- Food Technology
- Pharmacy

=== Faculty of Business ===
- Innovation and Entrepreneurship
- International Business Management
- Master in Bio Management

=== Professional Program ===
- Pharmacist Professional (Apoteker)

== Academic Ranking ==
=== Ranking ===
Indonesia International Institute for Life Sciences (i3L) is ranked at The Top 100 nationwide by the 2021 Overall Sinta Score awarded by Lembaga Layanan Pendidikan Tinggi (LLDIKTI), a work unit under the Directorate General of Higher Education, Ministry of Education, Culture, Research, and Technology.

== See also ==
- List of universities in Indonesia
