= Pulo Gadung (Transjakarta) =

Bus terminus in East Jakarta, Indonesia

2 01 4 01 Pulo Gadung
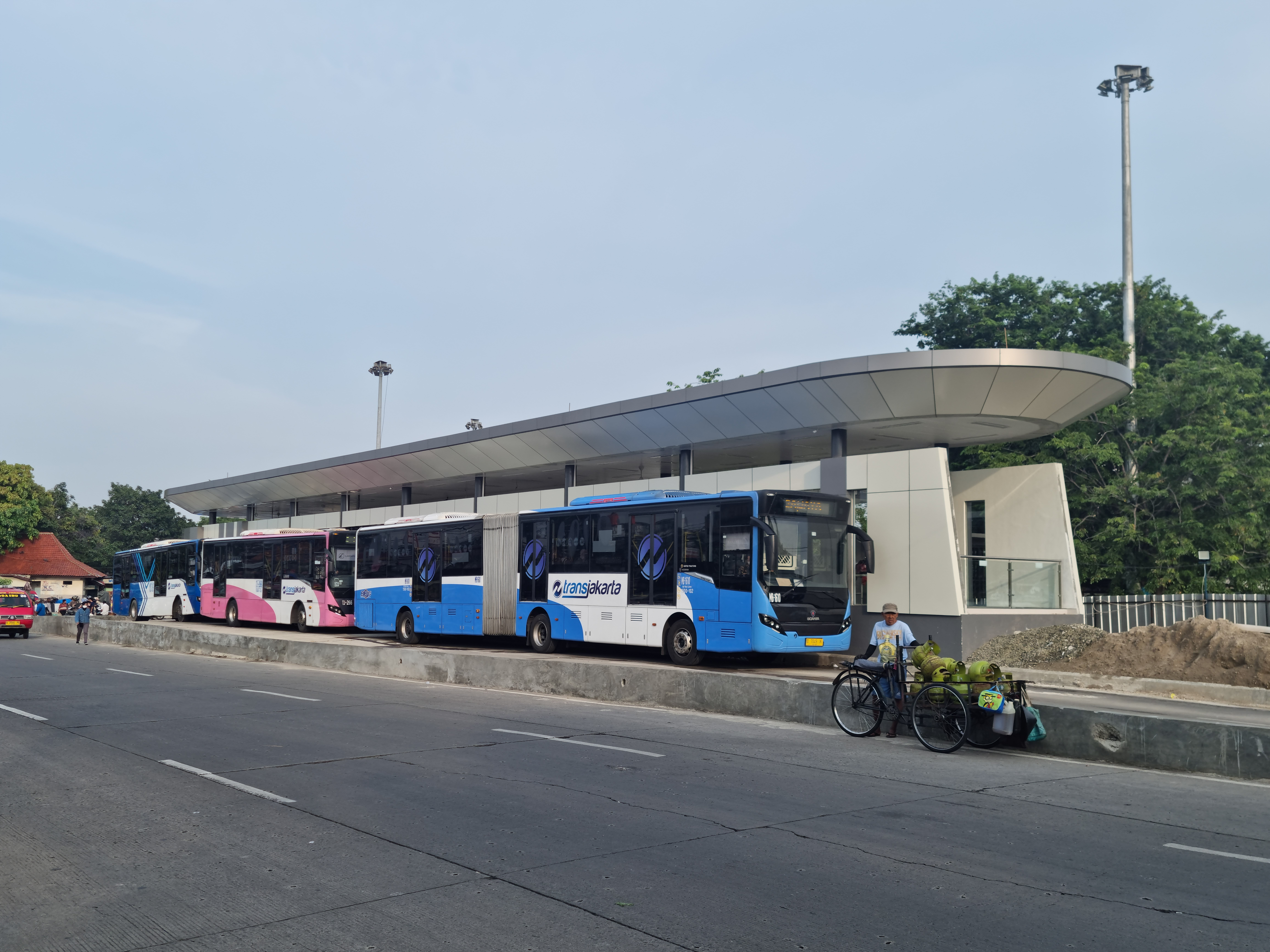

General information
- Location: Pulo Gadung Bus Terminal; Pulo Gadung, Pulo Gadung, East Jakarta 13260, Indonesia
- Coordinates: 6.183291°S 106.909009°E
- System: Transjakarta bus rapid transit station
- Owner: Transjakarta
- Operator: Transjakarta
- Lines: List of Transjakarta corridors#Corridor 2 List of Transjakarta corridors#Cross-corridor routes List of Transjakarta corridors#Corridor 4
- Platforms: Two side platforms

Construction
- Structure type: At-grade
- Cycle facilities: No

Other information
- Status: In service

History
- Opened: 15 January 2006
- Rebuilt: 18 April 2023
- Former names: Pulogadung 1 Pulogadung 2

Services
Preceding		Following
Terminus	Corridor 2 Terminus	Bermis towards Monumen Nasional
Terminus	Corridor 2 Route 2A Terminus	Bermis towards Rawa Buaya
Terminus	Corridor 4 Terminus	Pasar Pulo Gadung towards Galunggung
Terminus	Corridor 4 Route 4D Terminus	Pasar Pulo Gadung towards Patra Kuningan
Location

Pulo Gadung (sometimes spelled as Pulogadung) is a Transjakarta bus rapid transit station located within the Pulo Gadung Bus Terminal in Pulo Gadung, East Jakarta, Indonesia. It is the eastern terminus of Corridor 2 towards Monumen Nasional and Corridor 4 towards Galunggung.

The BRT station is built on the southern corner of the bus terminal, which used to be one of the main hubs for intercity buses. After the opening of the larger Pulo Gebang terminal in late December 2016, all intercity bus services moved there and Pulo Gadung terminal now only serve Transjakarta and angkot (microbus-based share taxi) routes.

== History ==
Originally, there used to be two separate stations: Pulogadung 1, serving Corridor 2, and Pulogadung 2, serving Corridor 4. The two stations had separate paid areas that transferring between the two required tapping out and paying again.

On September 6, 2022, the two stations were closed for revitalisation works. Corridor 2 passengers were advised to tap out at Bermis station instead even if continuing their journey towards Pulogadung 1. Corridor 4 passengers on the other hand were provided with shuttle service 4ST. On April 18, 2023, the new, unified Pulo Gadung station reopened, and route 4ST was deactivated.

== Building and layout ==
The revitalized Pulo Gadung BRT station is an L-shaped structure, consisting of the west platform for Corridor 4 (former site of Pulogadung 2), the south platform for Corridor 2 (former site of Pulogadung 1), and the linkway between the two. Both platform buildings have six bays, and now include toilets and prayer rooms (musala).

Below is the layout of the Pulo Gadung station platform based on the routes served, last updated on November 23, 2024:

		North
towards Galunggung and towards Patra Kuningan	Side platform, the platform doors are opened on the left side of the direction of travel
	Side platform, the platform doors are opened on the left side of the direction of travel	South
		Side platform, the platform doors are opened on the left side of the direction of travel
↓ (Pasar Pulo Gadung)		towards Monumen Nasional and towards Rawa Buaya	(Bermis) ⤴

== Non-BRT bus services ==
The following non-BRT bus services stop around the Pulo Gadung station, last updated on June 11, 2026:

Type	Route	Destination	Notes
Inner city feeder		Pulo Gadung—Transera Harapan Indah	Outside the station
Inner city feeder		Pulo Gadung—Rusun Cakung Barat (Albo)	Outside the station
Inner city feeder		Pulo Gadung—Pinang Ranti	Outside the station
Inner city feeder		Pulo Gadung—Kejaksaan Agung	Outside the station
Inner city feeder		Pulo Gadung—Pulo Gebang via PIK Penggilingan	Outside the station
Inner city feeder		Pulo Gadung— Klender Station via JIEP Pulo Gadung	Outside the station
Jakarta Fair feeder		Pulo Gadung—JIEXPO Kemayoran	Only operates during the Jakarta Fair and/or other events at the JIEXPO Kemayoran. Inside the station
Mikrotrans Jak Lingko	4E	Pulo Gadung—Rusun Jatinegara Kaum	Outside the station
Mikrotrans Jak Lingko	JAK 17	Pulo Gadung—Senen via Pemuda Street	Outside the station
Mikrotrans Jak Lingko	JAK 24	Pulo Gadung—Senen via Boulevard Barat Kelapa Gading Street	Outside the station
Mikrotrans Jak Lingko	JAK 33	Pulo Gadung— Jakarta Kota Station via JIEXPO	Outside the station
Mikrotrans Jak Lingko	JAK 41	Pulo Gadung—Kampung Melayu	Outside the station
Mikrotrans Jak Lingko	JAK 61	Pulo Gadung—ITC Cempaka Mas via Boulevard Barat Kelapa Gading Street	Outside the station
Mikrotrans Jak Lingko	JAK 99	Pulo Gadung—Lampiri	Outside the station
Mikrotrans Jak Lingko	JAK 112	Pulo Gadung—Tanah Merah	Outside the station

== Gallery ==
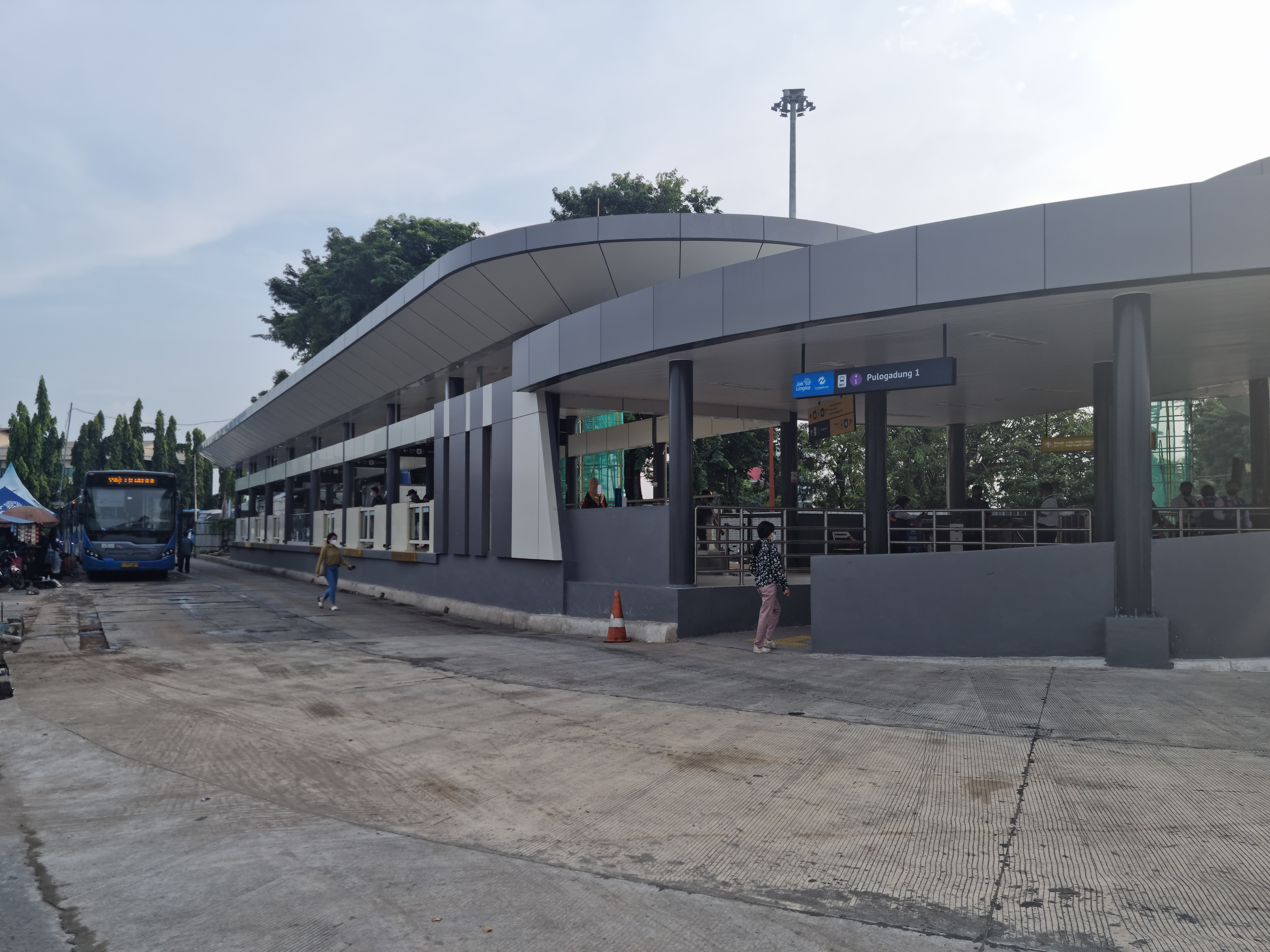
Ramp to enter the station on the western side

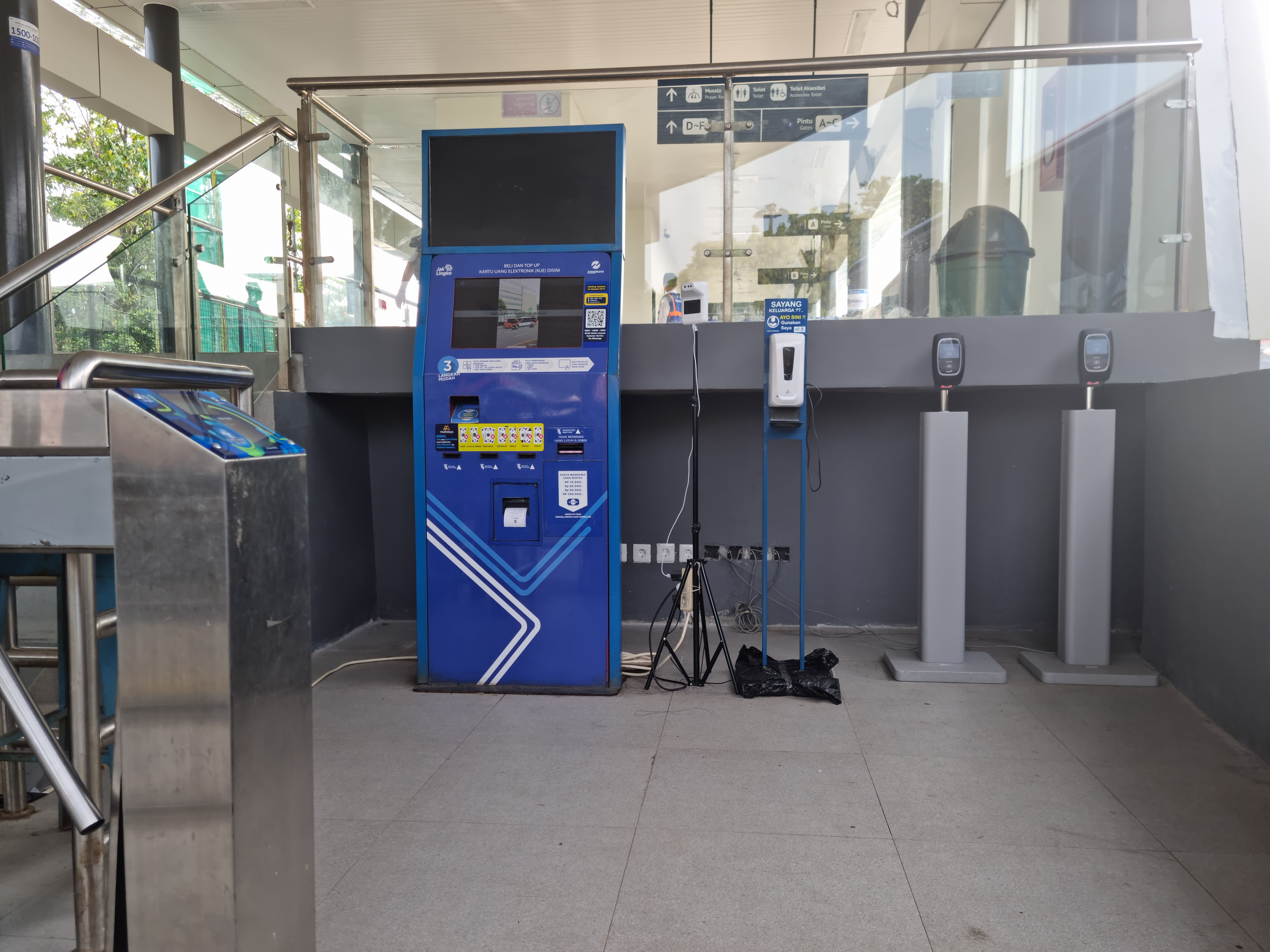
Vending machine facility in front of the station.

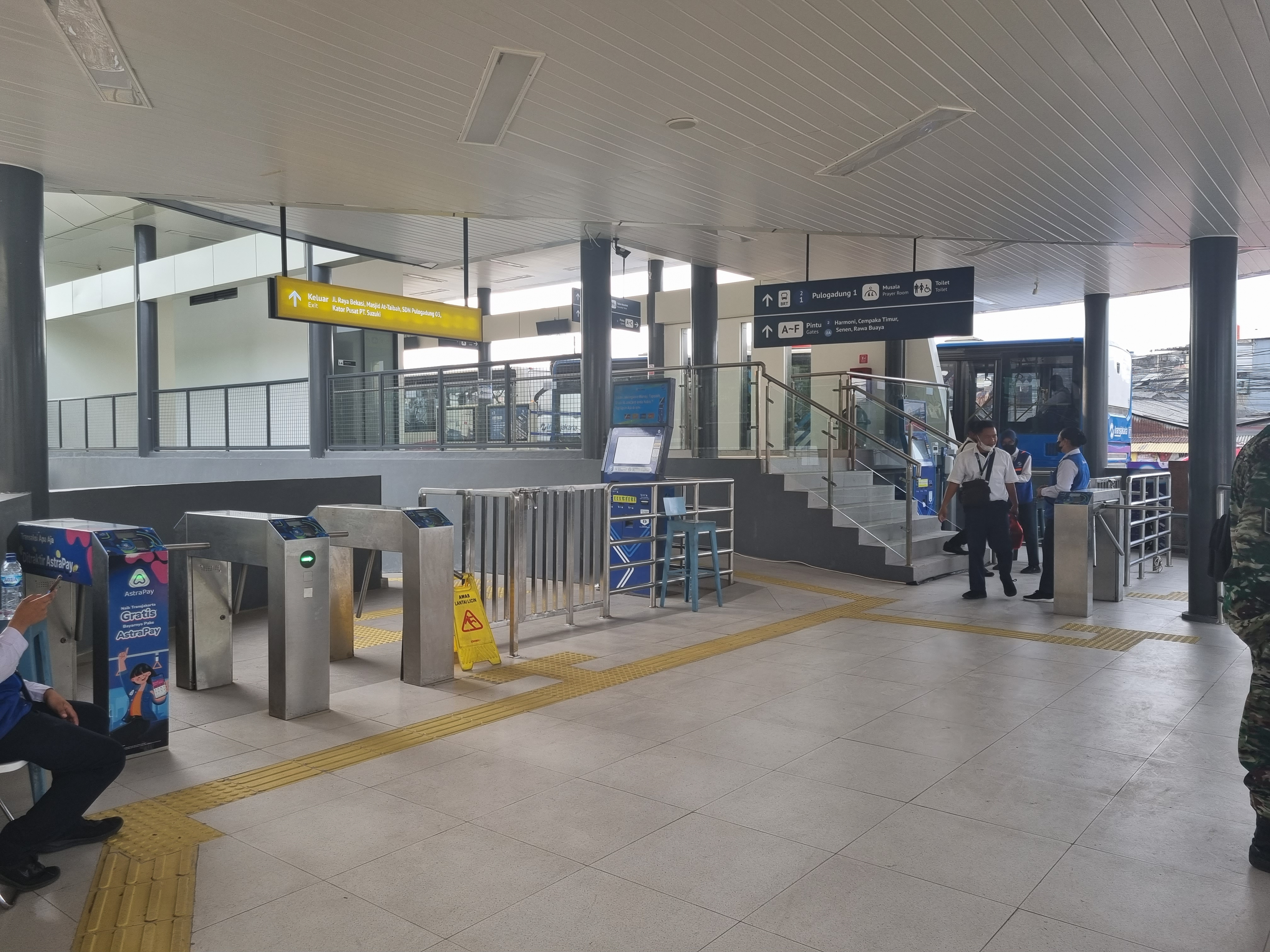
Connecting linkway between the two sides of the station.

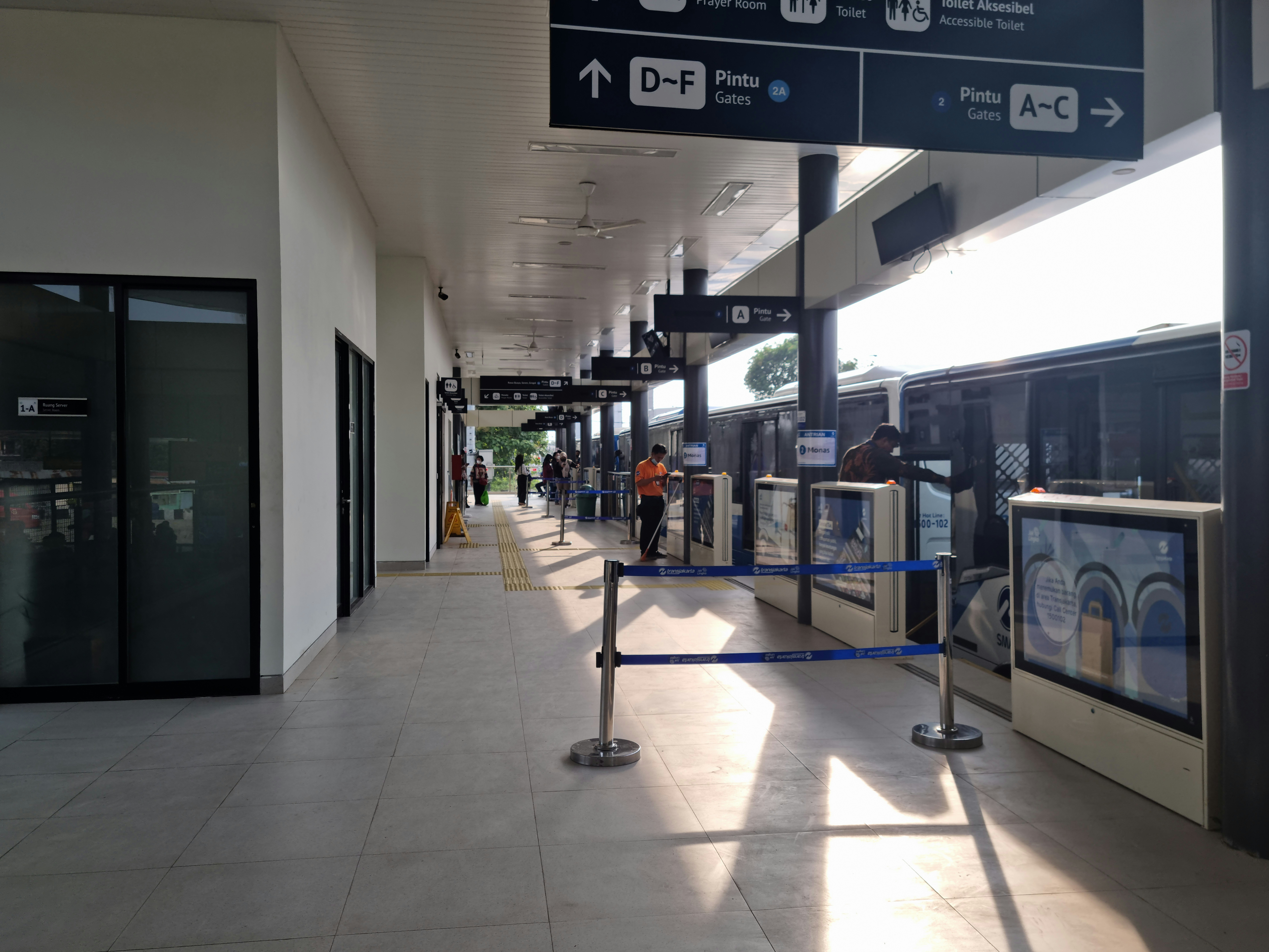
Southern platform serving Corridor 2.

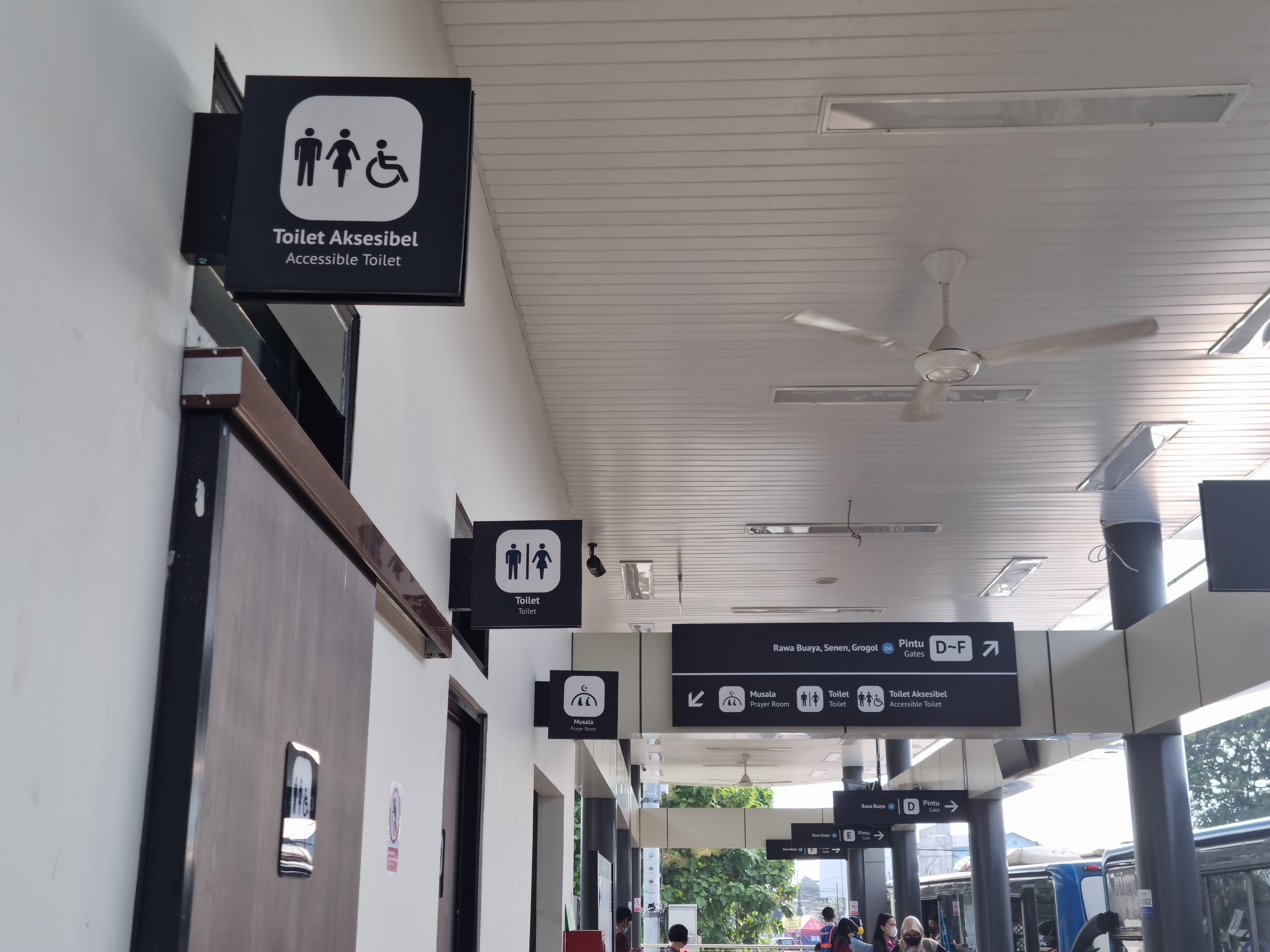
Toilet, disabled-friendly toilet, and praying room (musala) inside the station

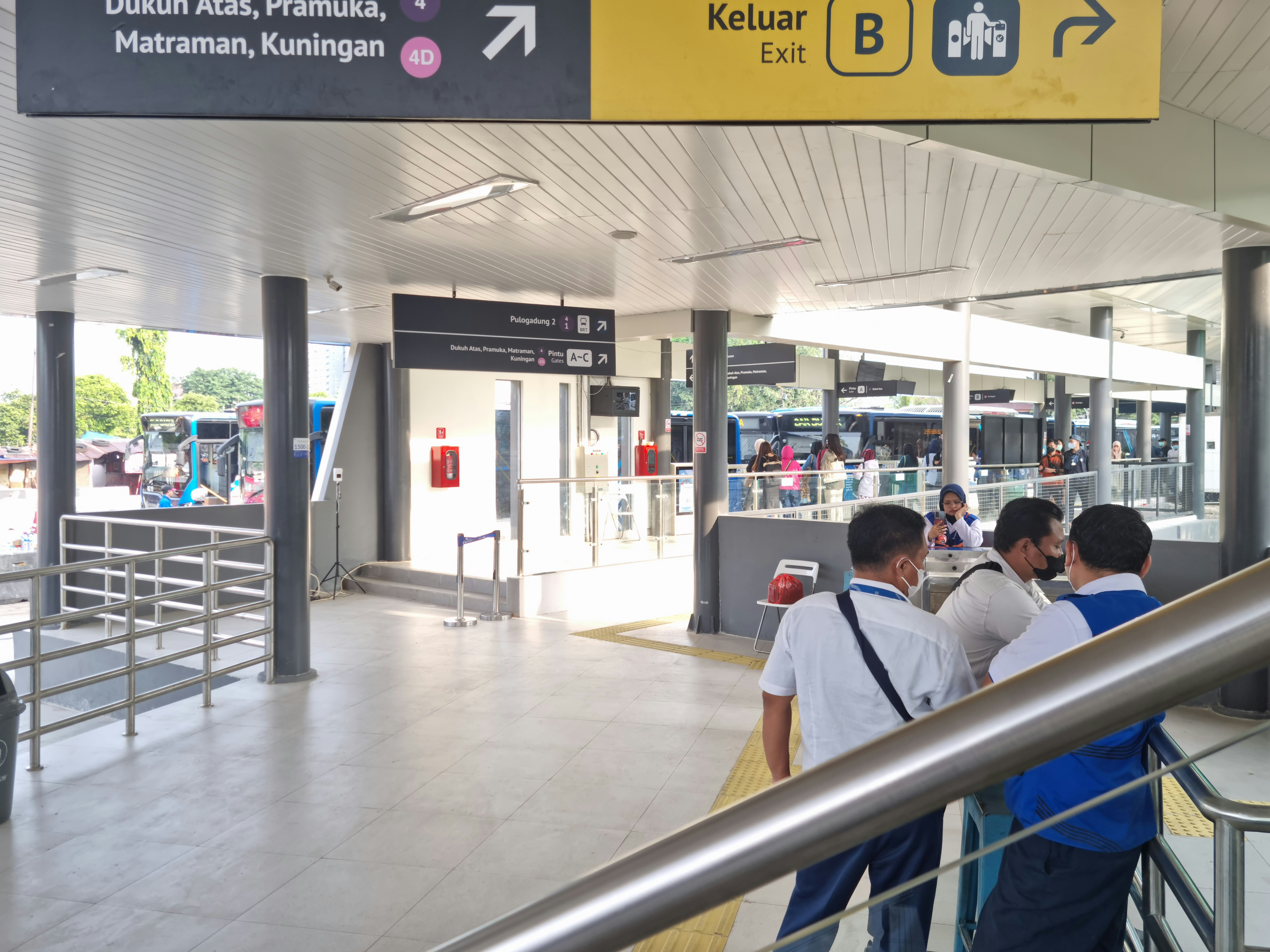
Linkway to western platform

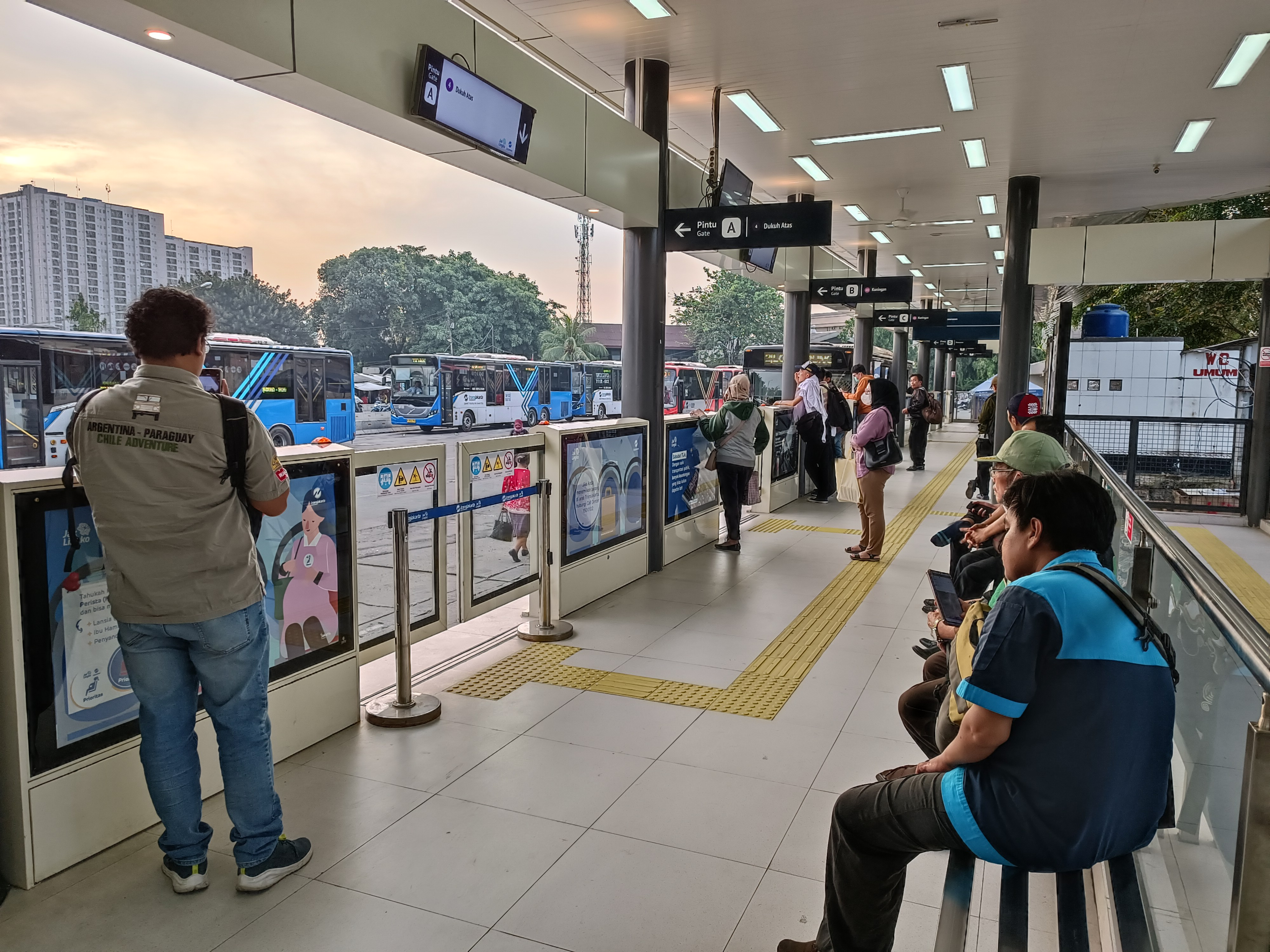
Western platform serving Corridor 4

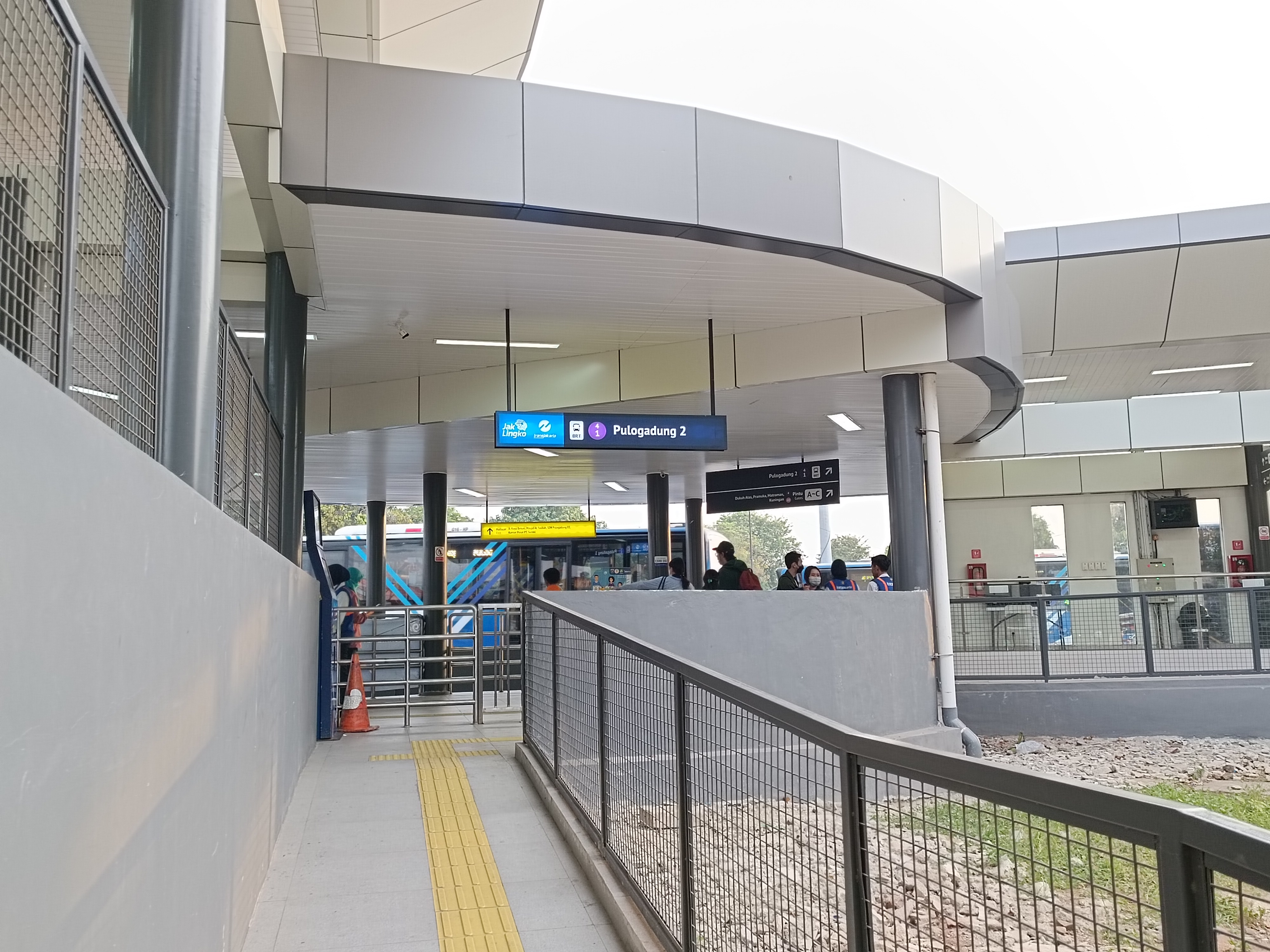
Ramp to enter the south platform
