= Galunggung (Transjakarta) =

Bus rapid transit station in Jakarta, Indonesia

4 17 6 19 Galunggung
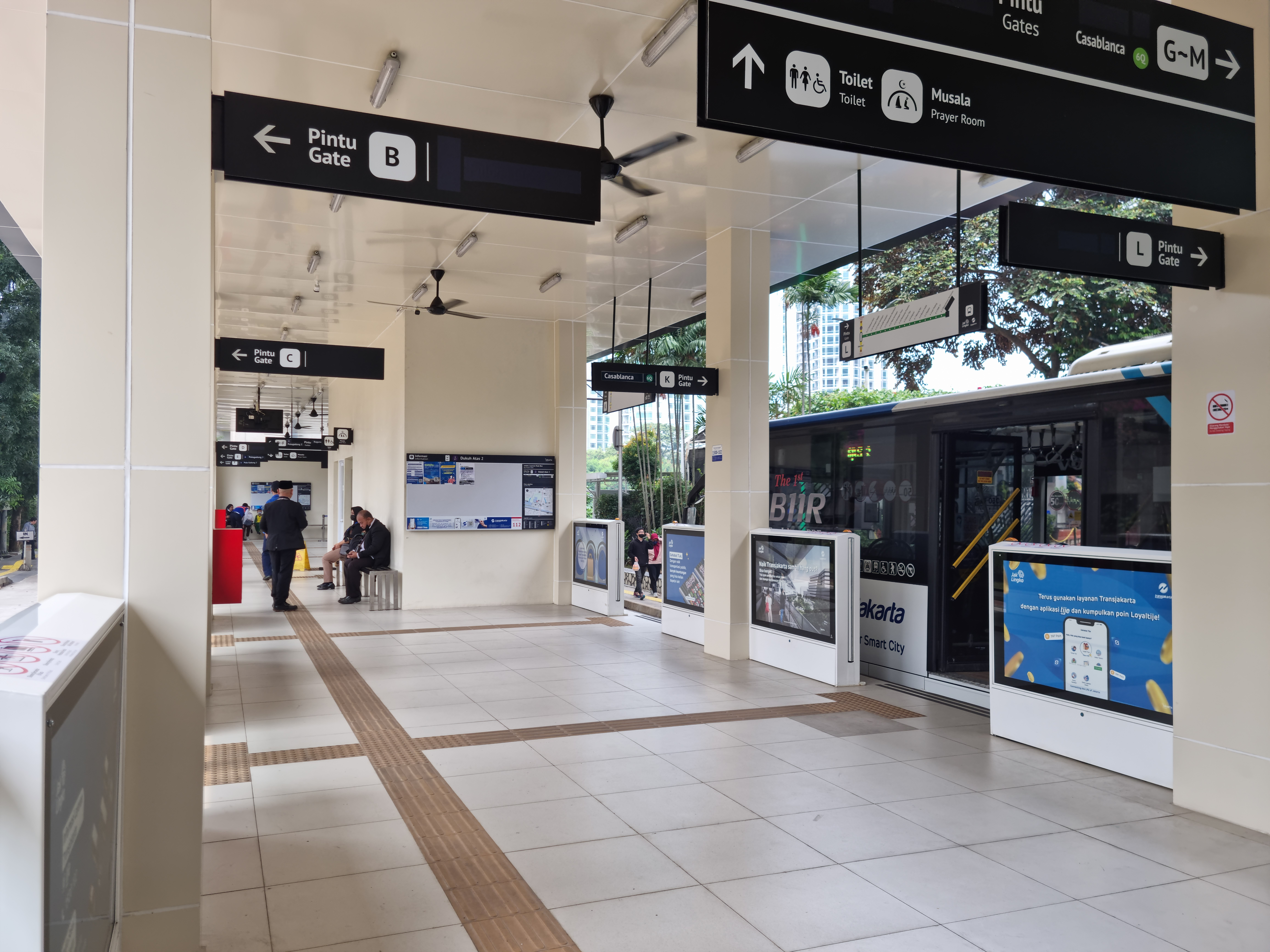
- View of the platform area

General information
- Location: Galunggung Street, Setiabudi, Setiabudi, South Jakarta 12910, Indonesia
- Coordinates: 6.20431°S 106.82356°E
- System: Transjakarta bus rapid transit station
- Owner: Transjakarta
- Operator: Transjakarta
- Lines: List of Transjakarta corridors#Corridor 4 List of TransJakarta corridors#Corridor 6
- Platforms: Single island platform
- Connections: Dukuh Atas; BNI City; Sudirman; Dukuh Atas BNI; Dukuh Atas Bank Syariah Indonesia

Construction
- Structure type: At-grade
- Cycle facilities: No

Other information
- Status: In service

History
- Opened: 27 January 2007
- Rebuilt: 20 May 2023; 3 years ago
- Former names: Dukuh Atas 2

Services
Preceding		Following
Halimun towards Pulo Gadung	Corridor 4 Terminus	Terminus
Setiabudi Integritas towards Ragunan	Corridor 6 Terminus	Flyover Kuningan One-way operation
Karet towards Blok M	Corridor 1 transfer at Dukuh Atas	Tosari towards Kali Besar
Karet towards Ragunan	Corridor 6 Route 6B transfer at Dukuh Atas	Tosari towards Balai Kota
Location

Galunggung is a Transjakarta bus rapid transit station located within the Dukuh Atas TOD zone in Setiabudi, South Jakarta, Indonesia. It is the western terminus of Corridor 4 and northern terminus of Corridor 6, and is connected by a paid transfer skybridge to Dukuh Atas station that serves Corridor 1. It is named after the street it is located on, which is taken after Mount Galunggung near Tasikmalaya, West Java.

== History ==
The station opened on 27 January 2007 together with Corridors 4 and 6 as Dukuh Atas 2, distinguishing itself from the existing Dukuh Atas station of Corridor 1. It was originally built on the north side of the road. Before 2009, Corridor 6 terminates at Halimun before being extended here.

On 4 December 2019, the station temporarily closed due to the construction of the Dukuh Atas LRT station. During the process, Corridor 4 was rerouted to terminate at Tosari station and Corridor 6 was shortened again to Halimun. A temporary structure for the station was in operation during the LRT construction.

On 20 May 2023, the station reopened with a new building, this time placed on the median instead on the road side. However, the station is not directly connected to the nearby LRT station, instead passengers are required to exit the station and walk on the sidewalk of Galunggung Street to access the entrance to the LRT station.

Dukuh Atas 2 BRT station was renamed Galunggung in January 2024.

== Building and layout ==
The new station is located on Galunggung Street south of the Landmark Centre Building. This means that the stretch of the street is reserved for Transjakarta buses only.

The station features similar design to that of the revitalised Senen BRT station (before the incident in August 2025), with open-air design, wider bus gates, and platform screen doors in all nine platform bays (six on each side). The new station has step-free access through a ramp from the street leading to Dukuh Atas Skate Park, or through the skybridge from Sudirman Street (that is divided into unpaid area, for passengers crossing and accessing the station, and paid transfer area, for passengers transferring from Corridor 1). There are also other amenities, such as prayer room (musala), standard toilets and priority toilets for disabled people.

North	towards Pulo Gadung (Halimun) →
Island platform, doors open on the left or right
South	towards Ragunan (Setiabudi Integritas) →

== Non-BRT bus services ==
Type	Route	Destination	Notes
Inner city feeder		Galunggung—Kasablanka via Epicentrum	Outside the station
Cross-border feeder (Transjabodetabek)		Dukuh Atas—Bekasi via Becakayu Toll Road	Inside the station

== Places nearby ==
- Dukuh Atas Park
- Dukuh Atas Transport Hub
- Landamark Centre Building
- Wisma Indocement
- Wisma 46

== Gallery ==
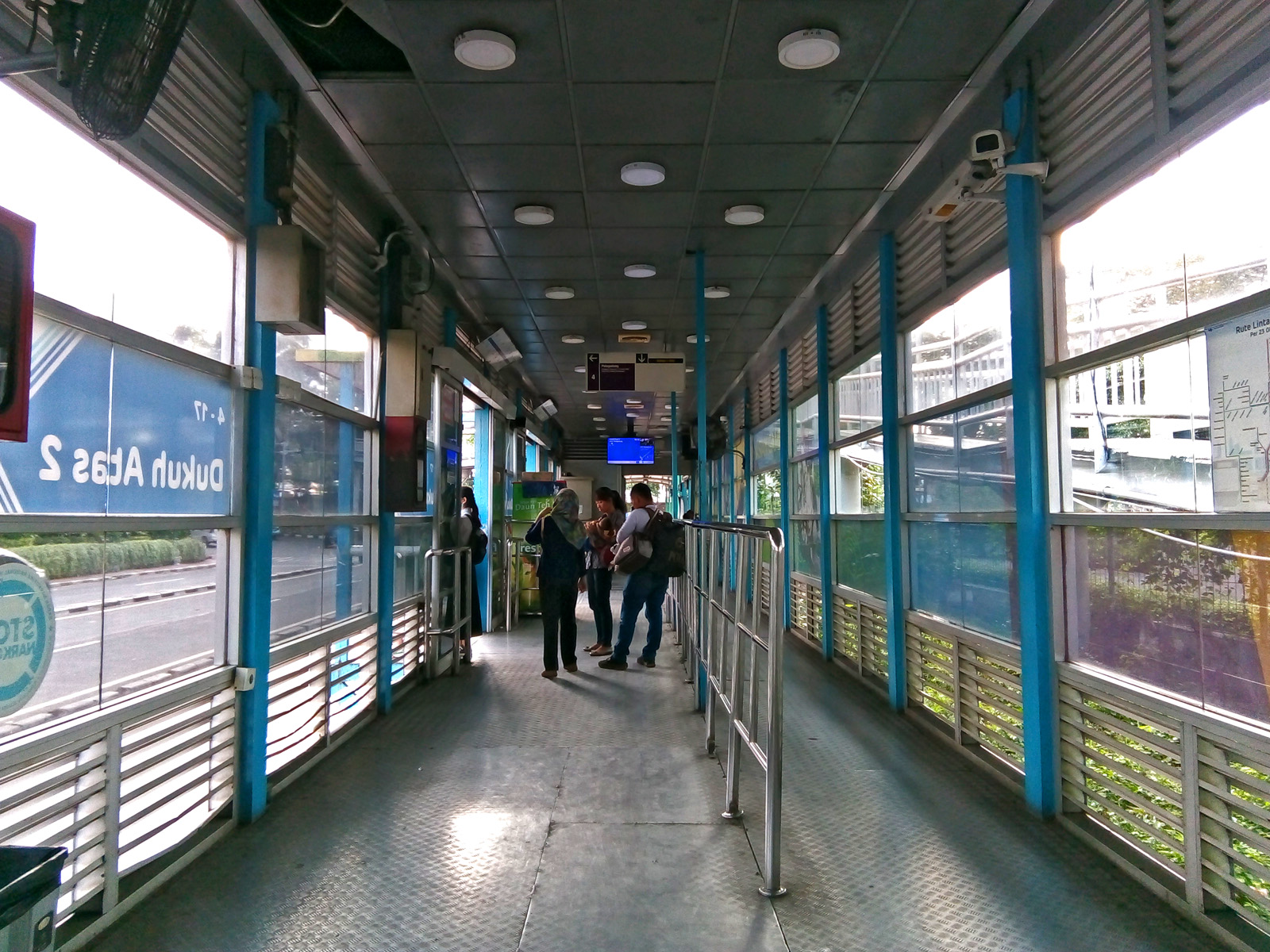
Interior of the original station, 2018

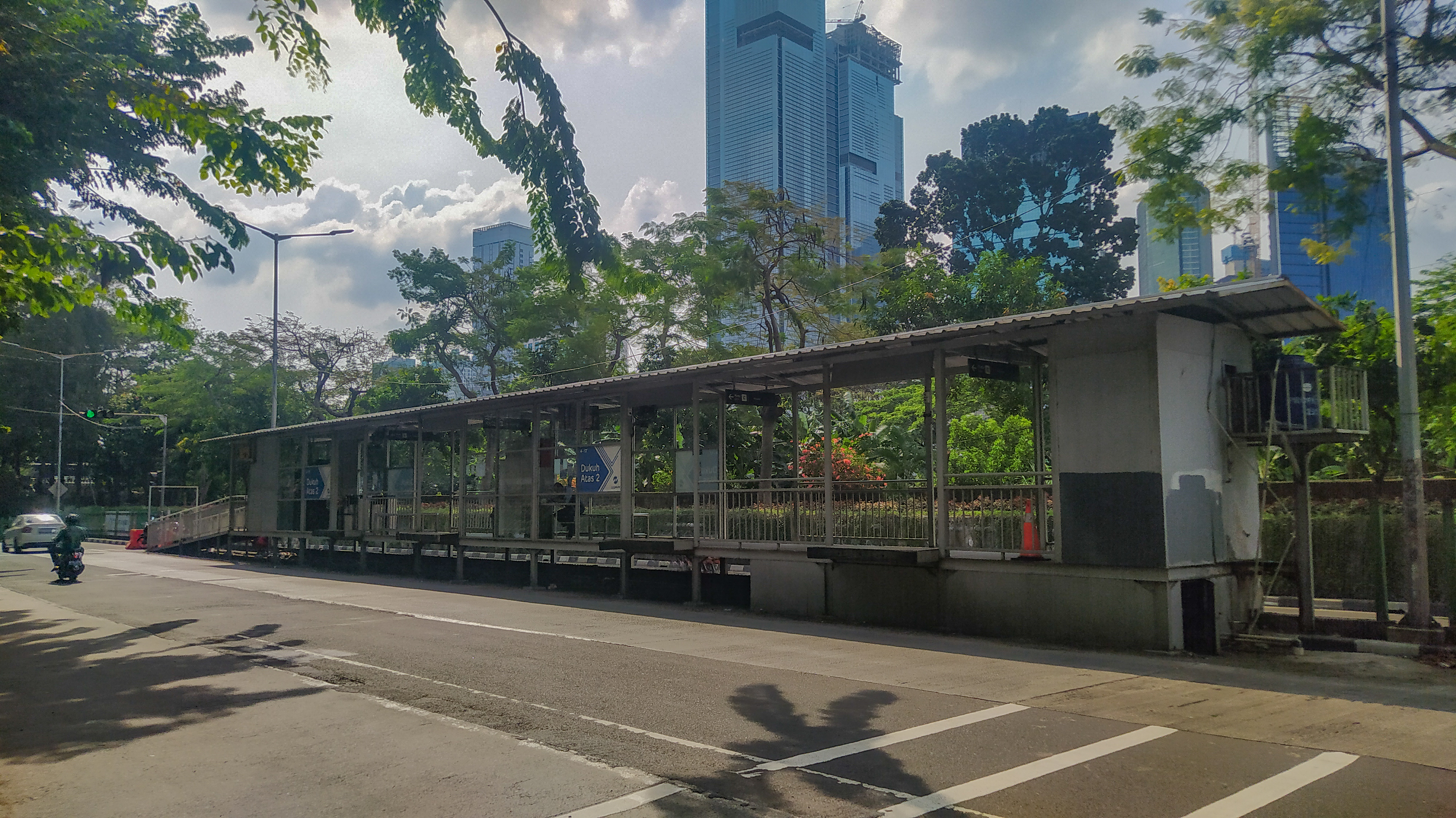
The temporary station, 2022

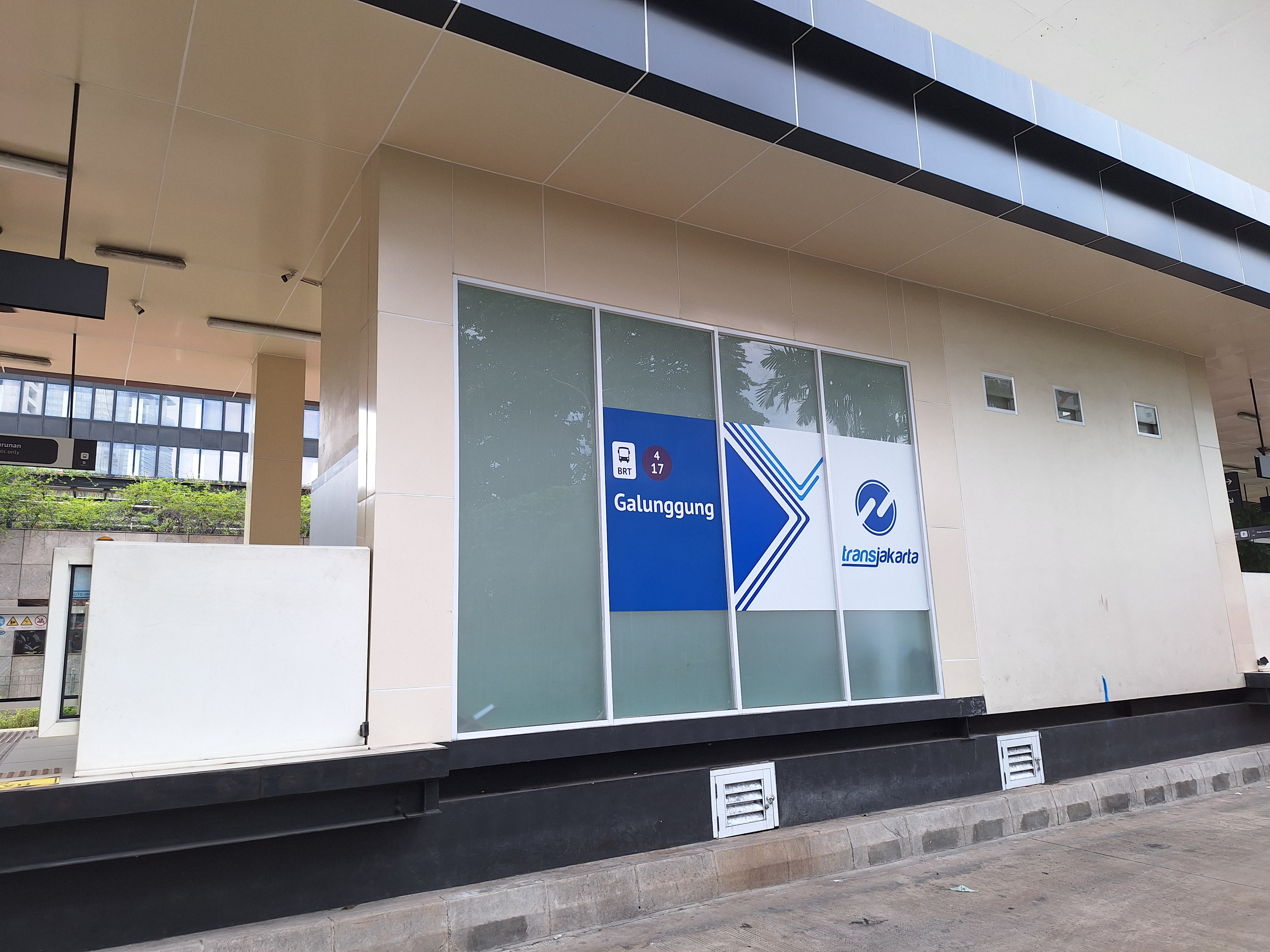
New station name board, 2024

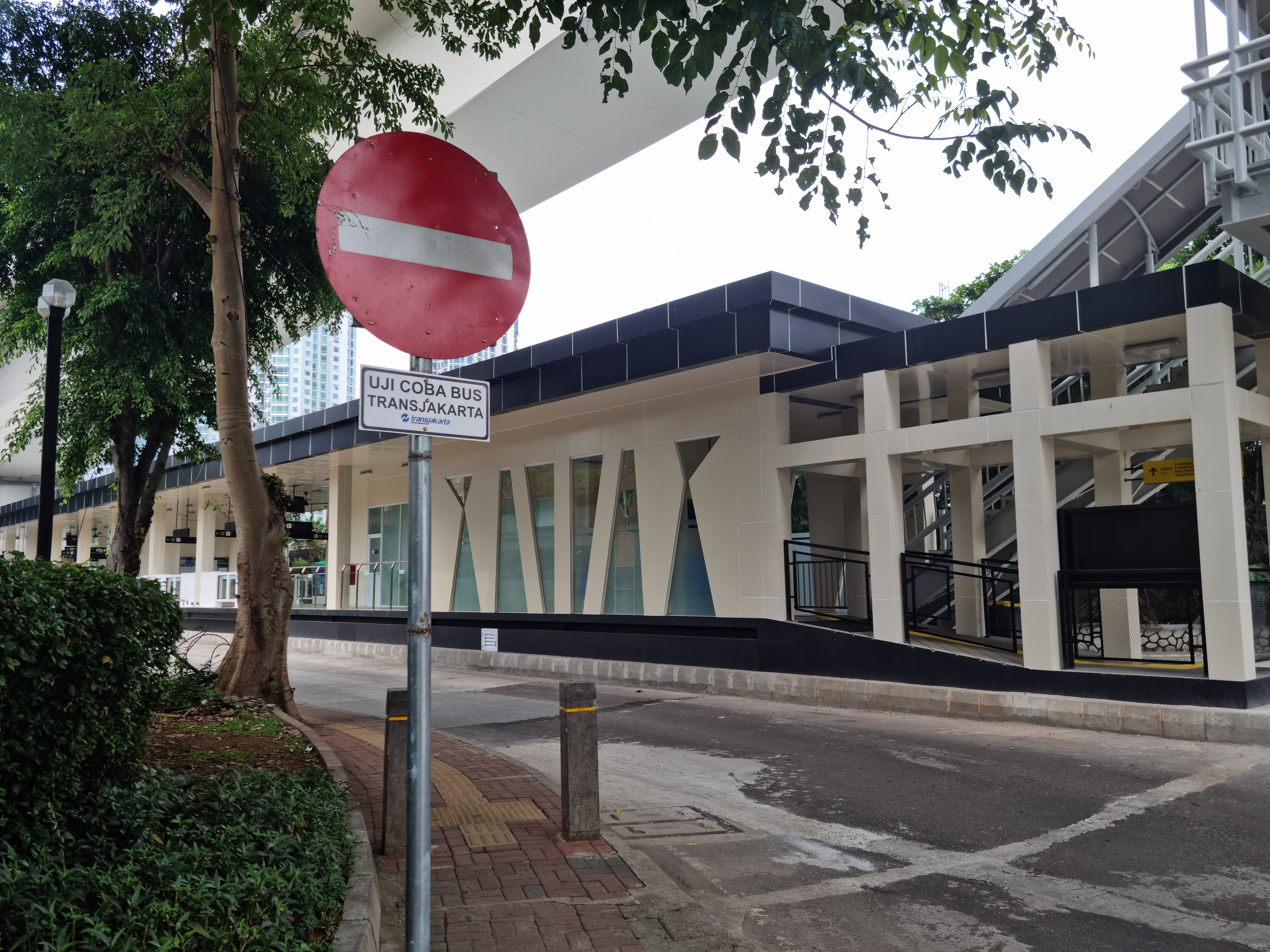
Transjakarta-exclusive lanes

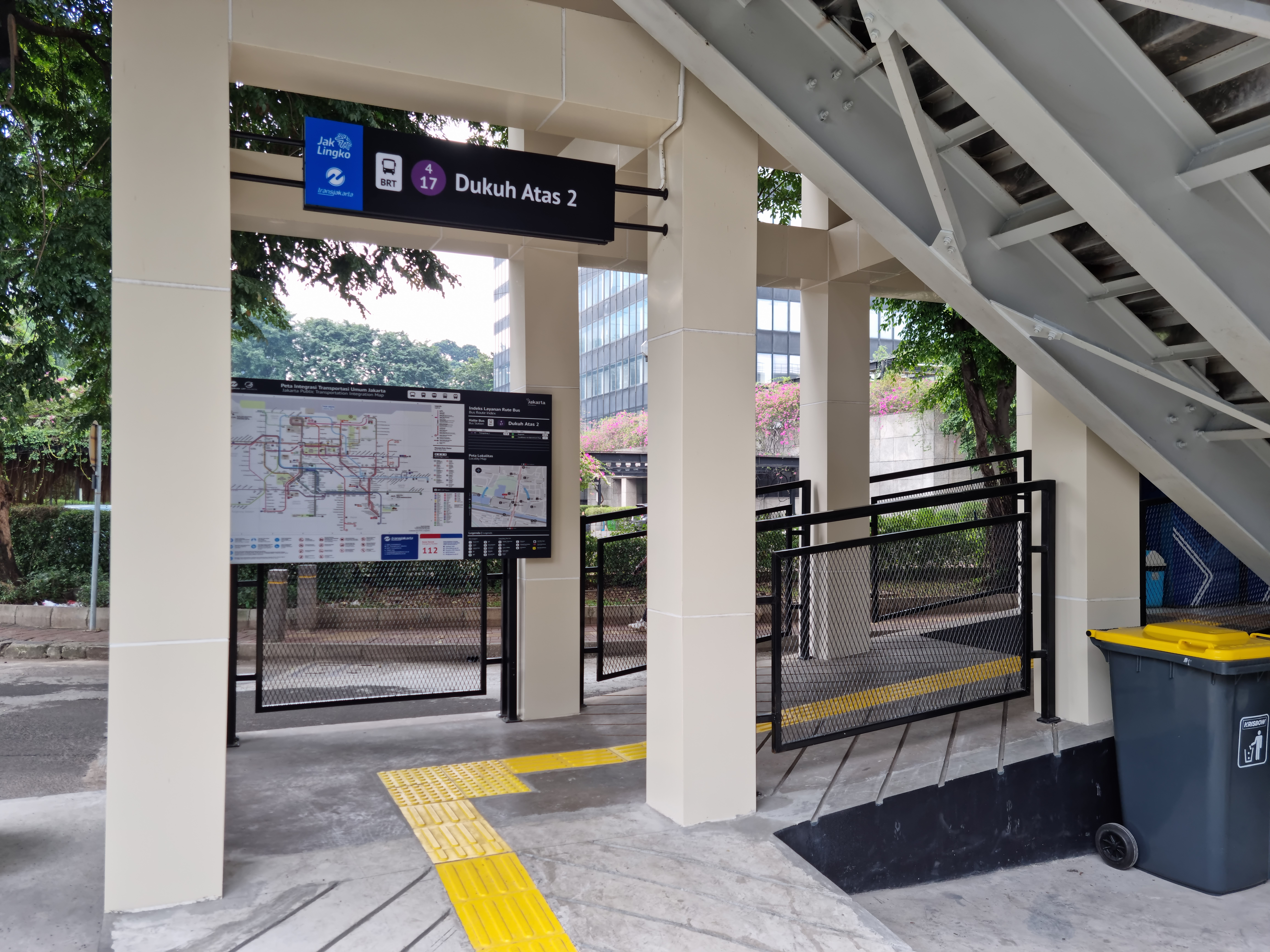
Fare gates and access to transfer linkway to Corridor 1

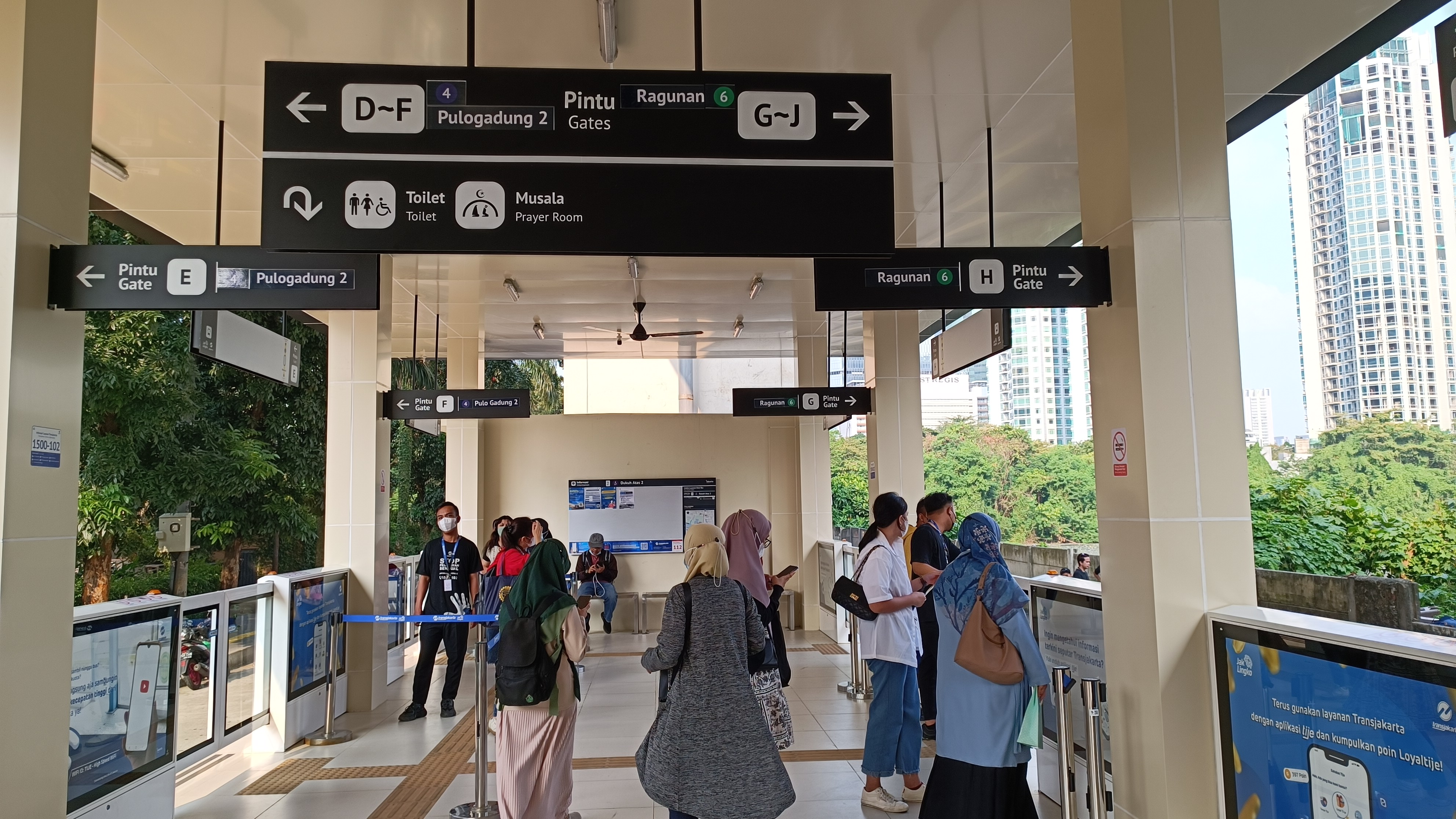
New station platform, 2023

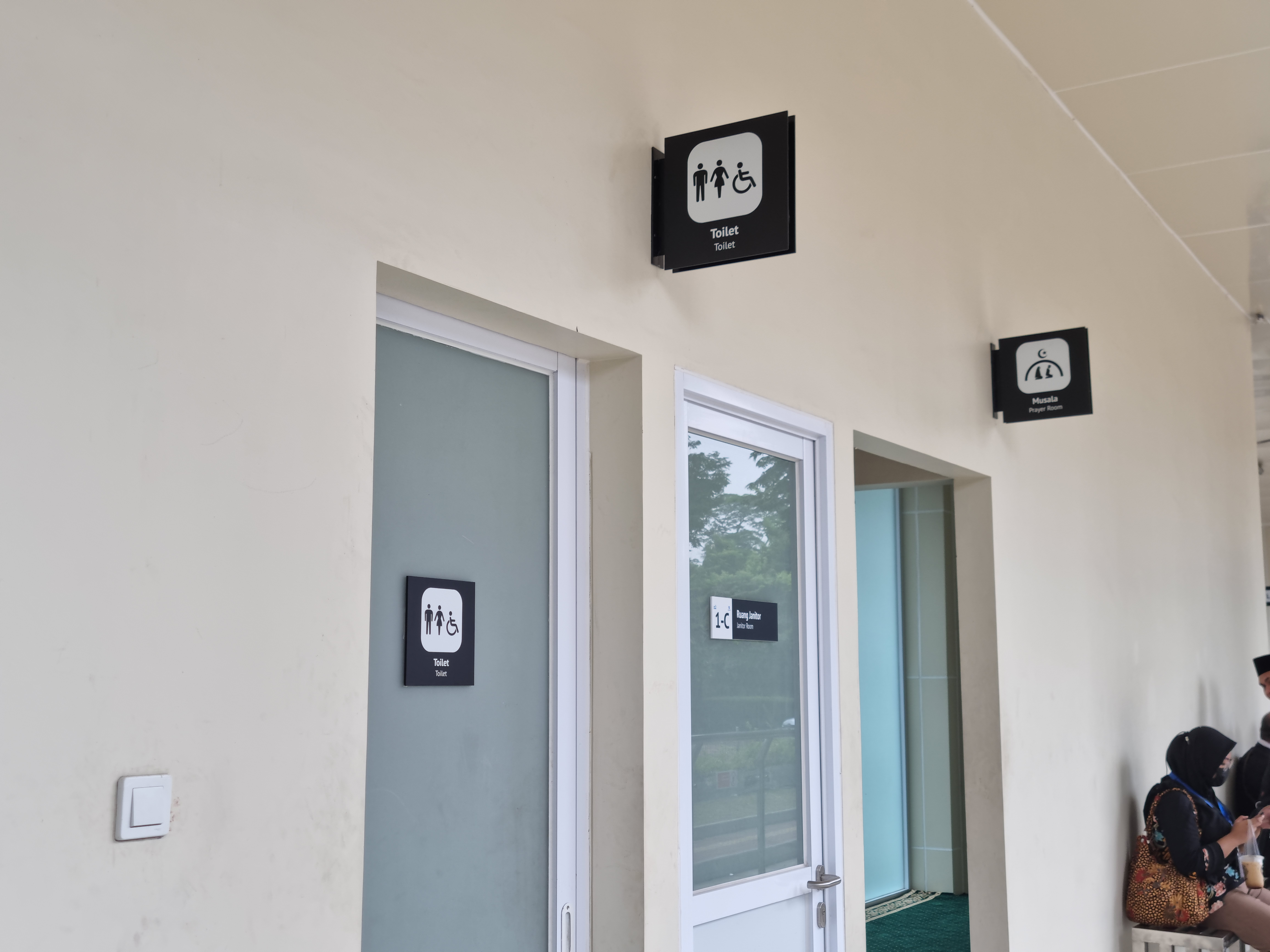
Toilets and priority toilets
