= Greater Jakarta Integrated Mass Transit System =

Rail transportation network in Indonesia

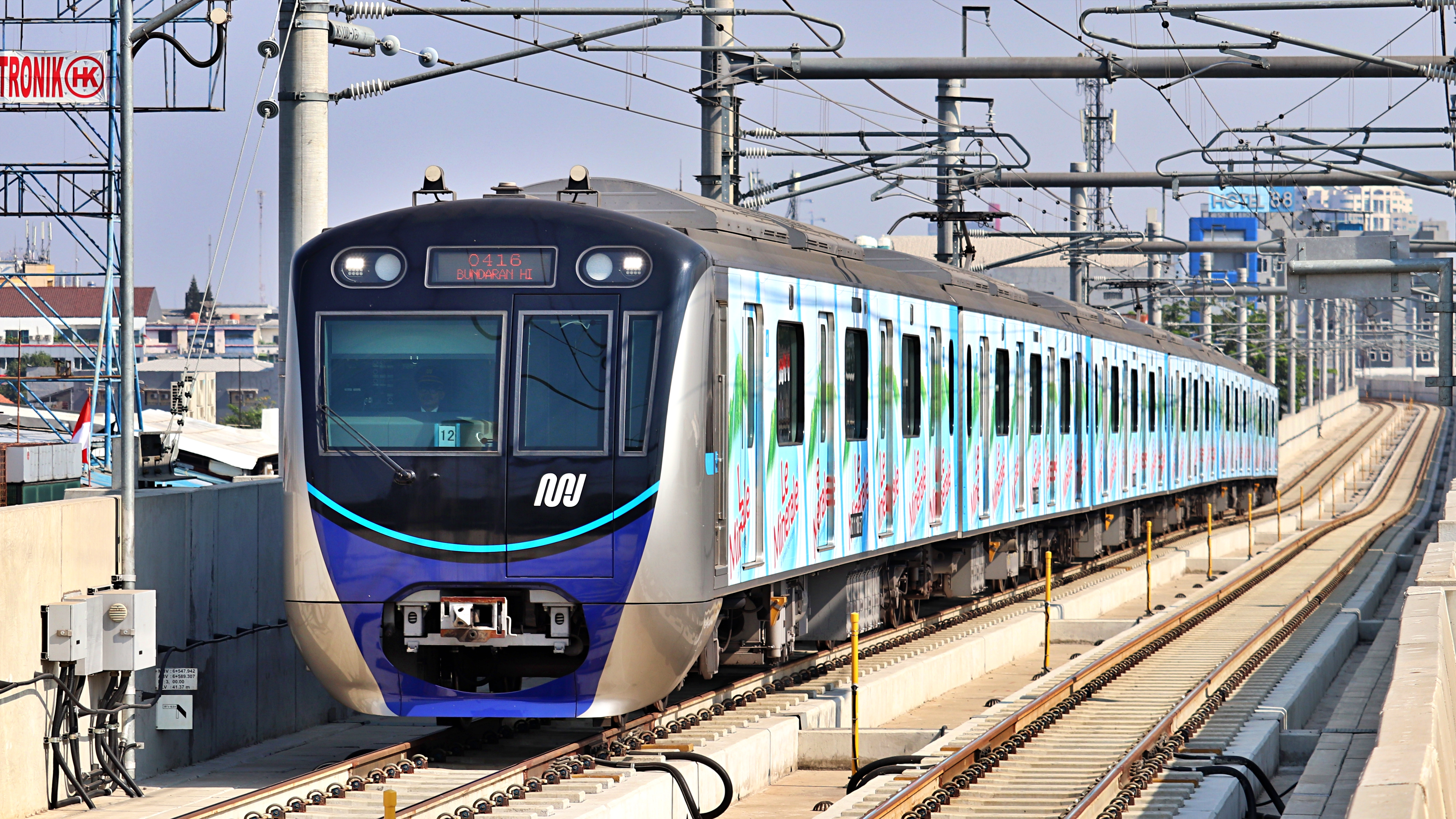
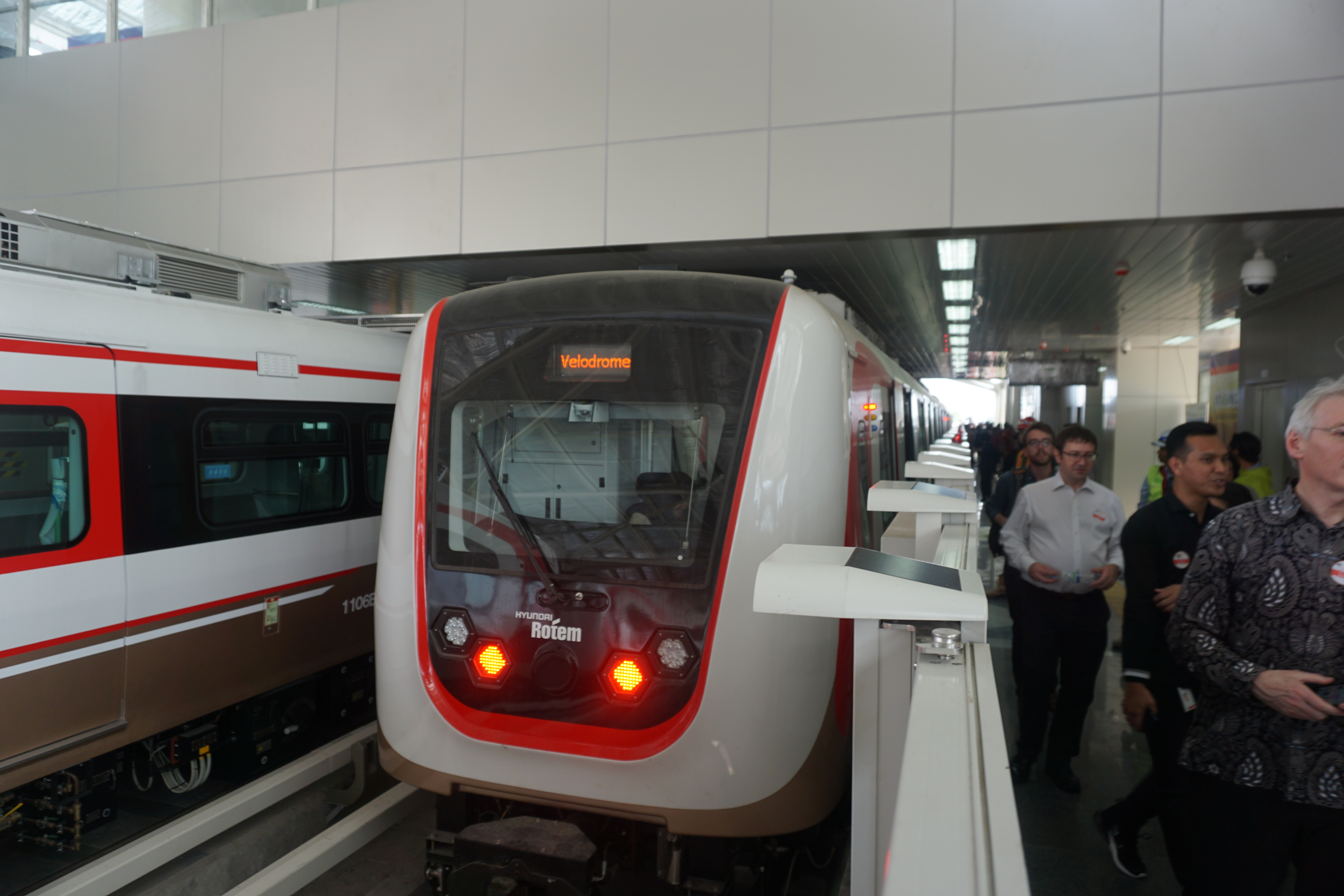
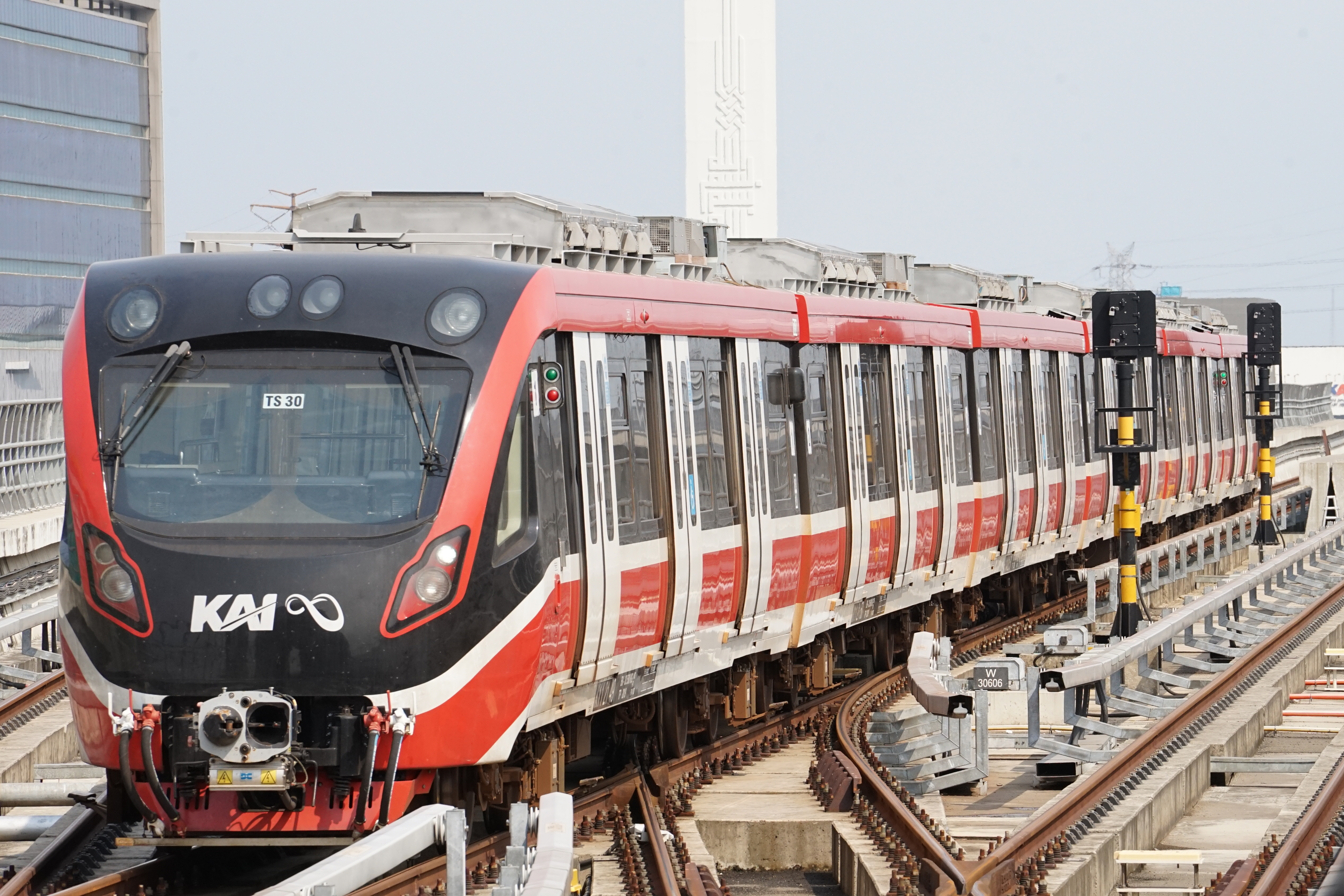
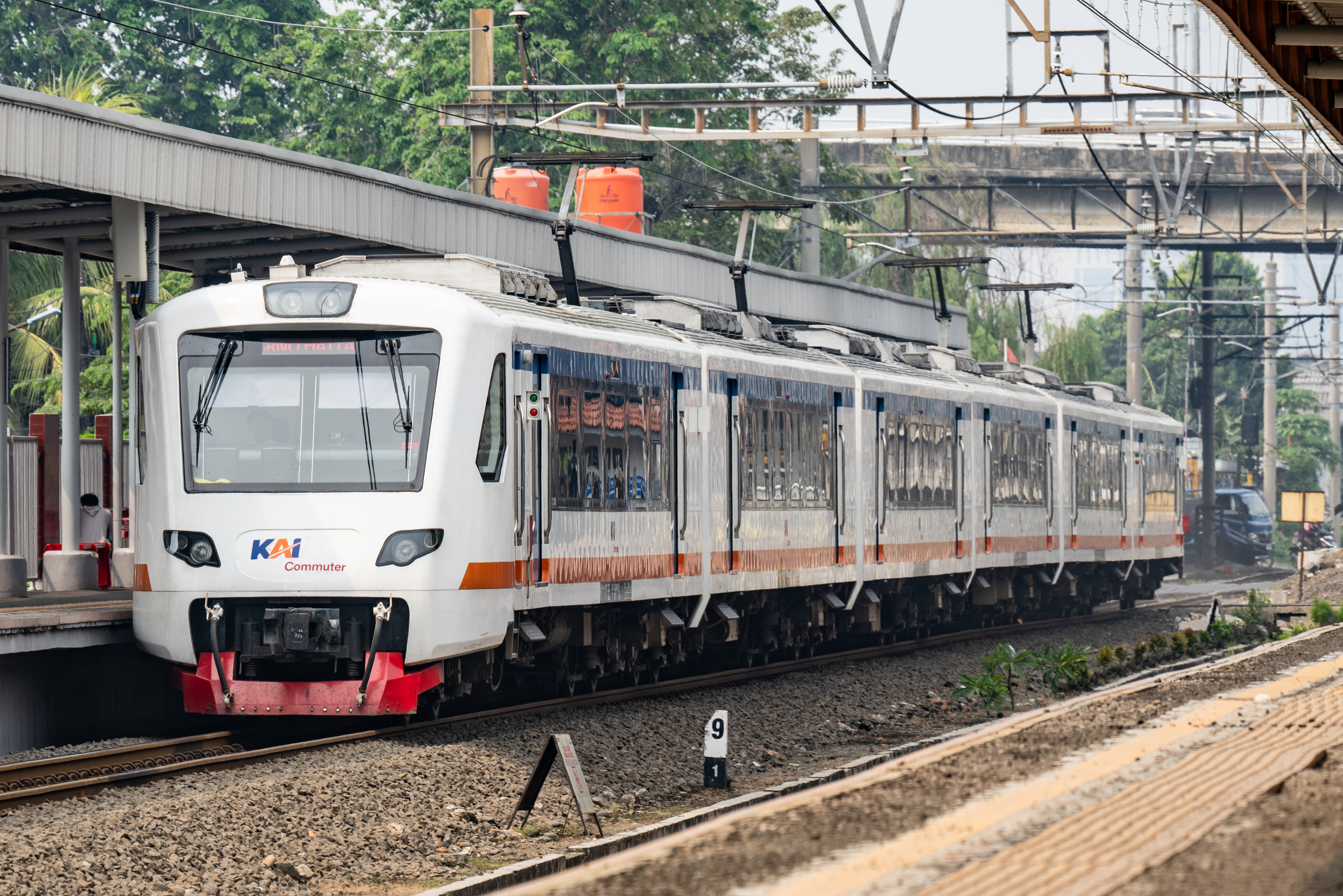
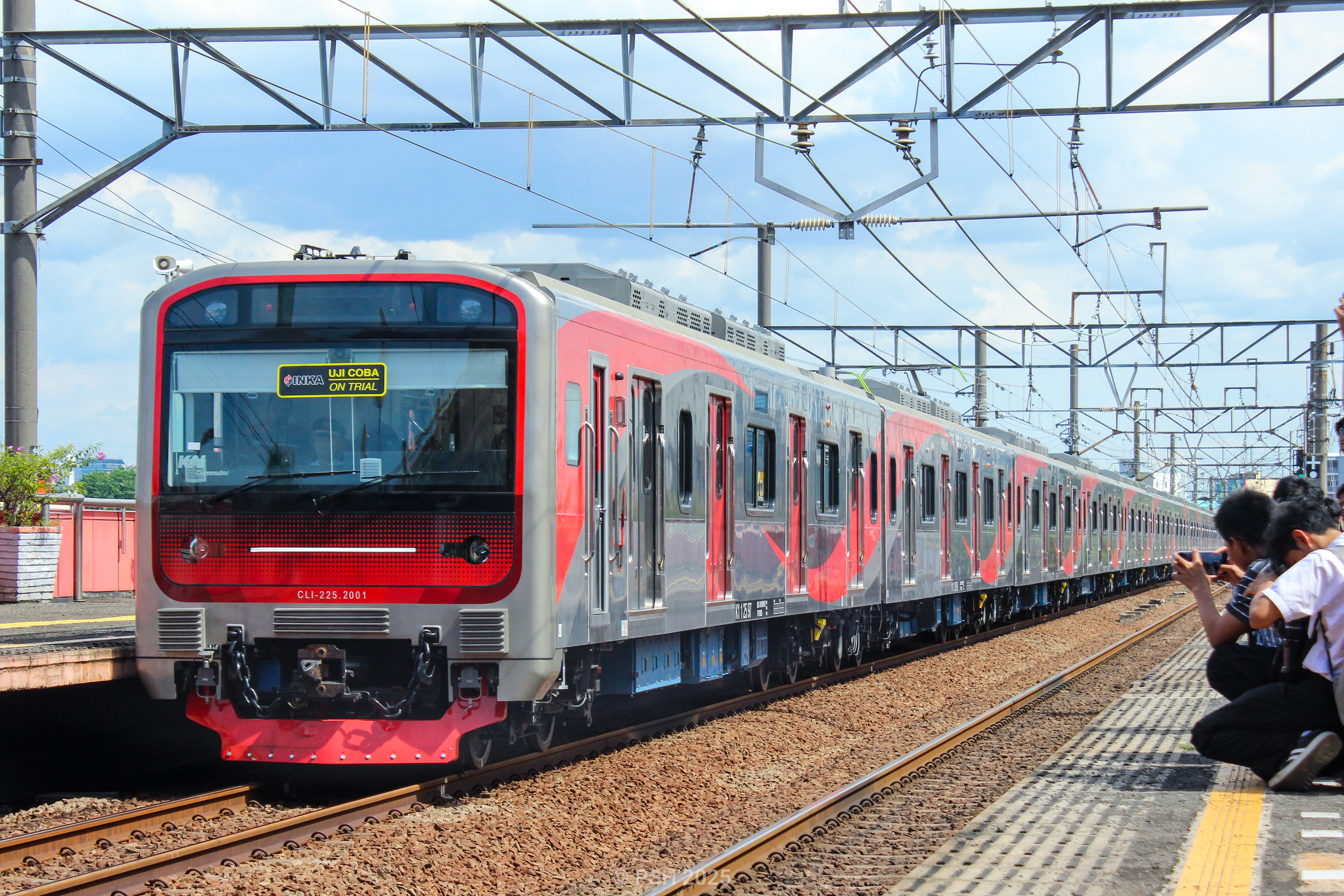
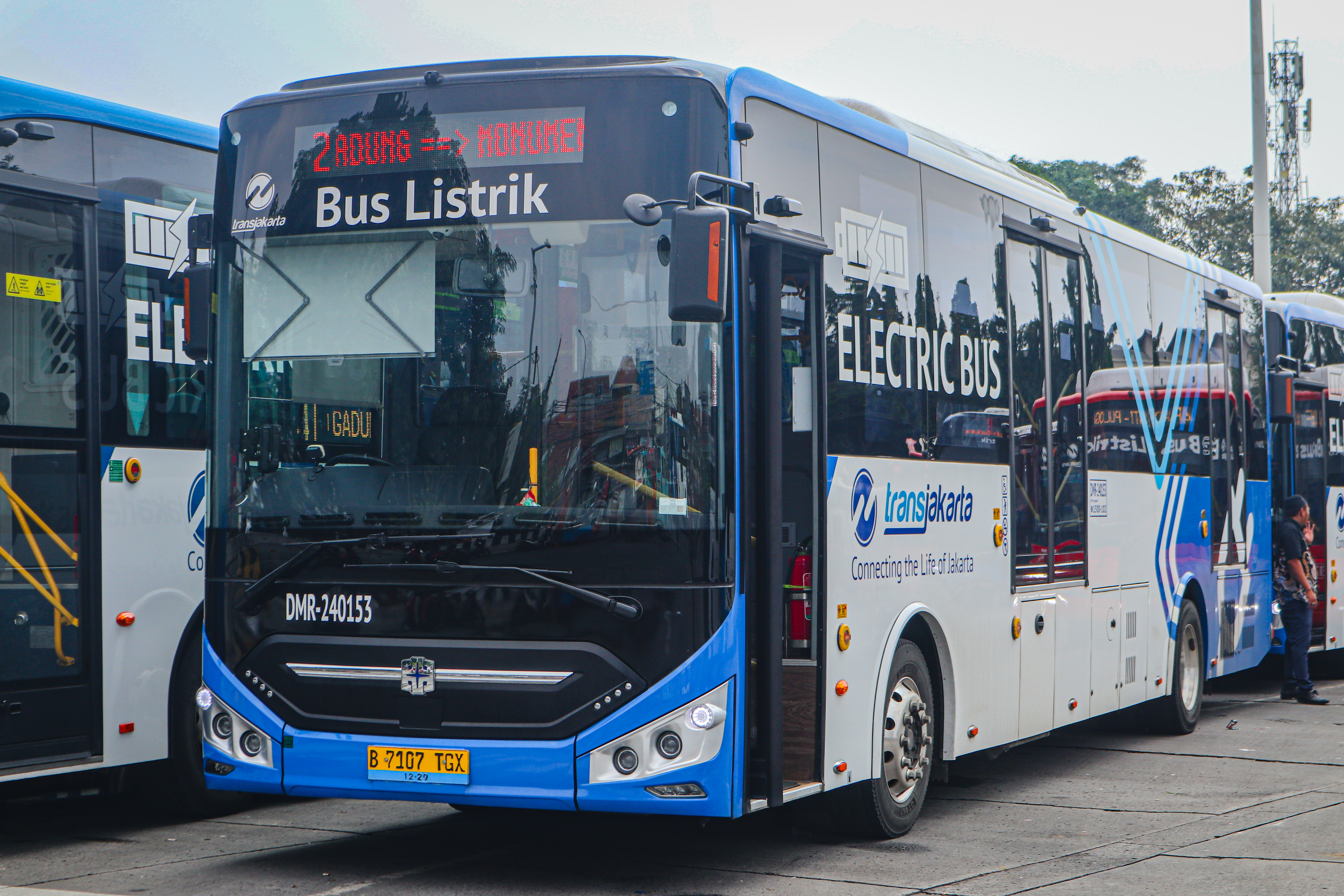
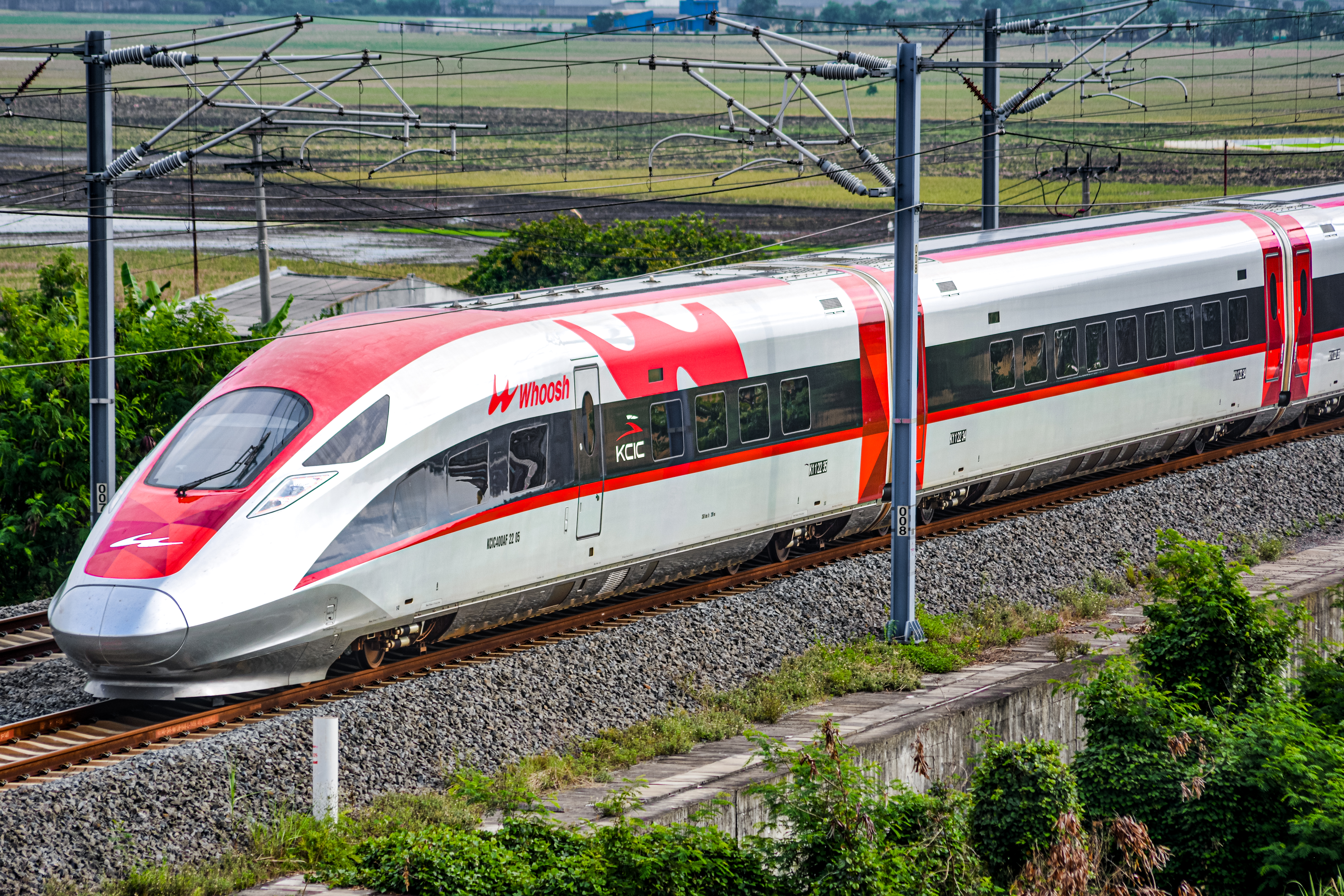
- Clockwise from top: Jakarta MRT, Jabodebek LRT, KRL Commuterline, Whoosh, Transjakarta, SHIA ARS, and Jakarta LRT

Overview
- Native name: Sistem Angkutan Massal Terpadu Jabodetabek (Indonesian)
- Locale: Greater Jakarta, Indonesia
- Transit type: Rapid Transit, Commuter Rail, Light Rapid Transit, Airport Rail Link, High Speed Rail & Bus Rapid Transit
- Number of lines: 25
- Number of stations: 428
- Daily ridership: ▲2.299 million (Average, 2025) ▲2.139 million (Average, 2024)
- Annual ridership: ▲0.839 billion (2025) ▲0.781 billion (2024)
- Website: www.jaklingkoindonesia.co.id

Operation
- Began operation: 15 January 2004; 22 years ago
- Operators: Jak Lingko; PT Mass Rapid Transit Jakarta (Jakarta MRT); PT LRT Jakarta (Jakarta LRT); PT Transportasi Jakarta (Transjakarta); Kereta Api Indonesia; KAI Commuter (KRL Commuterline & Airport rail link); Division of LRT Jabodebek (Jabodebek LRT); KCIC; (Whoosh)

Technical
- System length: 672.4 km (418 mi) (exclude Whoosh)
- Track gauge: 1,067 mm (3 ft 6 in); ,,,,,, 1,435 mm (4 ft 8 1/2 in); ,,, Separated carriageway; ,,,,,, ,,,,, Elevated carriageway
- Electrification: 750 V DC third rail; ,, 1,500 V DC overhead catenary; ,,,,,, 25 kV 50 Hz AC overhead line

The Greater Jakarta Integrated Mass Transit System is an integrated transport network that primarily serves the area of Jakarta metropolitan area and surrounding areas. The system commenced operations in January 2004 with the introduction of Transjakarta, a bus rapid transit system. It was significantly improved in 2011 with the modernisation of commuter rail services on the existing rail between Jakarta and satellite cities. The system has since expanded and currently consists of 11 fully operating rail lines in a radial formation; five commuter rail lines, one airport rail link line to the Soekarno Hatta International Airport's (SHIA) Terminal 1, Terminal 2, and Terminal 3, four rapid transit lines, fourteen bus rapid transit line and one high speed rail line to Bandung. The system encompasses 654.5 kilometres (406.7 mi) of grade-separated railway with 371 operational stations. All of the systems were then integrated following the introduction of Jak Lingko in December 2017.

== History ==
=== KRL Commuterline ===
The modernization of the commuter railway system, begin in 2011. Network operations were greatly simplified from 37 point-to-point service patterns into six integrated lines (known as "loop line" system) all running local, stopping at every station, as express services were abolished. On 17 April 2013, the Commuterline extension to Maja in the Green Line commenced operation.

=== Jakarta MRT ===
Transport issues are attracting increasing political attention with a government goal of increasing the number of trips using public transport to 60% by 2030. The idea of MRT construction in Jakarta has been sparked by the Head of the Agency for the Assessment and Application of Technology, B.J. Habibie (a man who would later become president). The first line of the Jakarta MRT was officially operated on 24 March 2019 after being inaugurated by President Joko Widodo.

=== Jabodebek LRT ===
The Jabodebek light rapid transit project is aimed to tackle Jakarta's high road traffic congestion. The northern section of the LRT project partly replaces the Jakarta Monorail project which has been cancelled. The LRT's public free trial run, is planned started on 12 July 2023, with commercial operations slated to begin on 17 August 2023. The trial lasted until 17 July, before it was halted for a software upgrade.

=== Jakarta LRT ===
The proposed LRT system in Jakarta was initially conceived as an alternative to the suspended Jakarta Monorail construction project. A full public trial run began on 11 June 2019 between Boulevard Utara and Velodrome stations, with free admission to registered ticket holders.

=== SHIA Airport Rail Link ===
The project plan was officially solidified only in 2011 with the issuing of a presidential regulation, Keppres No. 83 Year 2011, which assigned PT Angkasa Pura II and PT Kereta Api Indonesia to carry out the project. The railway was opened between SHIA and BNI City on 26 December 2017 and officially inaugurated on 2 January 2018. Services were extended to Manggarai on 5 September 2019.

=== Whoosh ===
Concepts for high-speed rail (HSR) in Indonesia were first to discussions at Asian Investment Summit in 2013, and detailed plans being set forth in 2015. The Jakarta-Bandung HSR began trial operation with passengers on 7 September 2023, and commercial operations on 2 October 2023.

=== Transjakarta ===
Transjakarta was conceived to provide a fast, comfortable, and affordable mass transportation system. The proposal for a BRT system in Jakarta was emerged in 2001. Governor of Jakarta at the time, Sutiyoso proposed four mass public transportation modes in Jakarta:. The first Transjakarta line opened to the public on 15 January 2004. It was free for the first two weeks, after which commercial operations started on 1 February 2004.

== Integration ==
Initially, different competing companies operated the various transit systems and had developed these rail and bus systems separately and at various times. As a result, many of these systems did not integrate well with the others, making transferring from system to system inconvenient for passengers. Then in December 2017, Jak Lingko was introduce as a public transport integration program designed to integrate payment and physical connection between transport modes in Jakarta. The integration includes BRT, Commuter rail, Light Metro, MRT, LRT, Airport rail link and local angkot (Mikrotrans).

== System network ==
At present public transport in Greater Jakarta consists of a Jakarta MRT, Jabodebek LRT, Jakarta LRT, KRL Commuterline, Soekarno-Hatta Airport Rail Link, and BRT Transjakarta

Symbol	Name	Began Operation	Last Extension	Terminus		Type	Depots	Owner	Operator(s)	No. of Stations	Length (km)	Ridership(s) 2024
Rail-based
KA Commuter Line Jakarta Kota–Tanjung Priok	Tanjung Priok Line	5 December 2011 (Note: Converted as KCJ line)	21 December 2015	Jakarta Kota	Tanjung Priok	Commuter rail (S-train)	Bukit Duri; Depok; Bogor; Manggarai	KAI Commuter	KRL Commuterline	4	15.4 km	334,361,011
KAI Commuter Cikarang Loop Line	Cikarang Loop Line	5 December 2011	28 May 2022	Kampung Bandan	Cikarang	Commuter rail (S-train)	Bukit Duri; Depok; Bogor; Manggarai	KAI Commuter	KRL Commuterline	29	87.4 km	334,361,011
KAI Commuter Bogor Line	Bogor Line	5 December 2011	28 May 2022	Jakarta Kota	Bogor	Commuter rail (S-train)	Bukit Duri; Depok; Bogor; Manggarai	KAI Commuter	KRL Commuterline	23	54.8 km	334,361,011
KAI Commuter Bogor Line	Bogor Line	5 December 2011	28 May 2022	Jakarta Kota	Nambo	Commuter rail (S-train)	Bukit Duri; Depok; Bogor; Manggarai	KAI Commuter	KRL Commuterline	22	51.0 km	334,361,011
KA Commuter Line Tanah Abang–Rangkasbitung	Rangkasbitung Line	5 December 2011	1 April 2017	Tanah Abang	Rangkasbitung	Commuter rail (S-train)	Bukit Duri; Depok; Bogor; Manggarai	KAI Commuter	KRL Commuterline	17	72.8 km	334,361,011
KA Commuter Line Duri–Tangerang	Tangerang Line	5 December 2011		Duri	Tangerang	Commuter rail (S-train)	Bukit Duri; Depok; Bogor; Manggarai	KAI Commuter	KRL Commuterline	11	19.3 km	334,361,011
Soekarno–Hatta Airport Rail Link	Soekarno-Hatta Line	31 December 2017	8 September 2019	Manggarai	Soekarno-Hatta	Airport rail link	Manggarai	KAI	KAI Commuter	5	54.3 km	2,380,704
MRT Line 1 (Jakarta Mass Rapid Transit)	North-South Line	24 March 2019		Lebak Bulus	Bundaran HI Bank Jakarta	Rapid transit	Lebak Bulus	MRT Jakarta		13	15.7 km	39,910,100
LRT Line S (Jakarta LRT)	Southern Line	1 December 2019	16 September 2026	Kelapa Gading	Manggarai	Light metro	Kelapa Gading	LRT Jakarta		11	12.2 km	1,213,461
LRT Line 1 (Greater Jakarta LRT)	Cibubur Line	28 August 2023		Dukuh Atas BNI	Harjamukti	Light metro	Jati Mulya	KAI	LRT Jabodebek	12	25.9 km	21,055,870
LRT Line 3 (Greater Jakarta LRT)	Bekasi Line	28 August 2023		Dukuh Atas BNI	Jati Mulya	Light metro	Jati Mulya	KAI	LRT Jabodebek	14	29.5 km	21,055,870
Bus rapid transit trunk lines
List of Transjakarta corridors#Corridor 1	Corridor 1	1 February 2004	22 July 2022	Blok M	Kota	Bus rapid transit	Cipayung; Ciputat; Cakung; Cawang; Pulo Gadung; Cijantung; Cibubur; Klender; Kelapa Gading; Klender; Jembatan Gantung; Rawa Buaya; Pinang Ranti; Kampung Rambutan; Pesing; Pamulang; Petukangan Selatan; Cipayung	Transjakarta		22	15.48 km	383,198,279
List of Transjakarta corridors#Corridor 2	Corridor 2	15 January 2006	4 March 2023	Pulo Gadung	Monumen Nasional	Bus rapid transit	Cipayung; Ciputat; Cakung; Cawang; Pulo Gadung; Cijantung; Cibubur; Klender; Kelapa Gading; Klender; Jembatan Gantung; Rawa Buaya; Pinang Ranti; Kampung Rambutan; Pesing; Pamulang; Petukangan Selatan; Cipayung	Transjakarta		24	17.88 km	383,198,279
List of Transjakarta corridors#Corridor 3	Corridor 3	15 January 2006	4 March 2023	Kalideres	Monumen Nasional	Bus rapid transit	Cipayung; Ciputat; Cakung; Cawang; Pulo Gadung; Cijantung; Cibubur; Klender; Kelapa Gading; Klender; Jembatan Gantung; Rawa Buaya; Pinang Ranti; Kampung Rambutan; Pesing; Pamulang; Petukangan Selatan; Cipayung	Transjakarta		14	16.14 km	383,198,279
List of Transjakarta corridors#Corridor 4	Corridor 4	27 January 2007		Pulo Gadung	Galunggung	Bus rapid transit	Cipayung; Ciputat; Cakung; Cawang; Pulo Gadung; Cijantung; Cibubur; Klender; Kelapa Gading; Klender; Jembatan Gantung; Rawa Buaya; Pinang Ranti; Kampung Rambutan; Pesing; Pamulang; Petukangan Selatan; Cipayung	Transjakarta		17	11.90 km	383,198,279
List of Transjakarta corridors#Corridor 5	Corridor 5	27 January 2007		Ancol	Kampung Melayu	Bus rapid transit	Cipayung; Ciputat; Cakung; Cawang; Pulo Gadung; Cijantung; Cibubur; Klender; Kelapa Gading; Klender; Jembatan Gantung; Rawa Buaya; Pinang Ranti; Kampung Rambutan; Pesing; Pamulang; Petukangan Selatan; Cipayung	Transjakarta		18	13.58 km	383,198,279
List of TransJakarta corridors#Corridor 6	Corridor 6	27 January 2007	ca. 2009	Ragunan	Galunggung	Bus rapid transit	Cipayung; Ciputat; Cakung; Cawang; Pulo Gadung; Cijantung; Cibubur; Klender; Kelapa Gading; Klender; Jembatan Gantung; Rawa Buaya; Pinang Ranti; Kampung Rambutan; Pesing; Pamulang; Petukangan Selatan; Cipayung	Transjakarta		20	15.90 km	383,198,279
List of TransJakarta corridors#Corridor 7	Corridor 7	27 January 2007		Kampung Rambutan	Kampung Melayu	Bus rapid transit	Cipayung; Ciputat; Cakung; Cawang; Pulo Gadung; Cijantung; Cibubur; Klender; Kelapa Gading; Klender; Jembatan Gantung; Rawa Buaya; Pinang Ranti; Kampung Rambutan; Pesing; Pamulang; Petukangan Selatan; Cipayung	Transjakarta		14	12.57 km	383,198,279
List of TransJakarta corridors#Corridor 8	Corridor 8	21 February 2009	4 March 2023	Lebak Bulus	Pasar Baru	Bus rapid transit	Cipayung; Ciputat; Cakung; Cawang; Pulo Gadung; Cijantung; Cibubur; Klender; Kelapa Gading; Klender; Jembatan Gantung; Rawa Buaya; Pinang Ranti; Kampung Rambutan; Pesing; Pamulang; Petukangan Selatan; Cipayung	Transjakarta		26	25.33 km	383,198,279
List of TransJakarta corridors#Corridor 9	Corridor 9	31 December 2010		Pinang Ranti	Pluit	Bus rapid transit	Cipayung; Ciputat; Cakung; Cawang; Pulo Gadung; Cijantung; Cibubur; Klender; Kelapa Gading; Klender; Jembatan Gantung; Rawa Buaya; Pinang Ranti; Kampung Rambutan; Pesing; Pamulang; Petukangan Selatan; Cipayung	Transjakarta		26	31.57 km	383,198,279
List of TransJakarta corridors#Corridor 10	Corridor 10	31 December 2010		Tanjung Priok	PGC	Bus rapid transit	Cipayung; Ciputat; Cakung; Cawang; Pulo Gadung; Cijantung; Cibubur; Klender; Kelapa Gading; Klender; Jembatan Gantung; Rawa Buaya; Pinang Ranti; Kampung Rambutan; Pesing; Pamulang; Petukangan Selatan; Cipayung	Transjakarta		22	19.11 km	383,198,279
List of TransJakarta corridors#Corridor 11	Corridor 11	28 December 2011	28 December 2016	Pulo Gebang	Kampung Melayu	Bus rapid transit	Cipayung; Ciputat; Cakung; Cawang; Pulo Gadung; Cijantung; Cibubur; Klender; Kelapa Gading; Klender; Jembatan Gantung; Rawa Buaya; Pinang Ranti; Kampung Rambutan; Pesing; Pamulang; Petukangan Selatan; Cipayung	Transjakarta		16	13.86 km	383,198,279
List of TransJakarta corridors#Corridor 12	Corridor 12	14 February 2013	18 December 2021	Pluit	Tanjung Priok	Bus rapid transit	Cipayung; Ciputat; Cakung; Cawang; Pulo Gadung; Cijantung; Cibubur; Klender; Kelapa Gading; Klender; Jembatan Gantung; Rawa Buaya; Pinang Ranti; Kampung Rambutan; Pesing; Pamulang; Petukangan Selatan; Cipayung	Transjakarta		24	23.30 km	383,198,279
List of TransJakarta corridors#Corridor 13	Corridor 13	13 August 2017	12 November 2018	CBD Ciledug	Tegal Mampang	Bus rapid transit	Cipayung; Ciputat; Cakung; Cawang; Pulo Gadung; Cijantung; Cibubur; Klender; Kelapa Gading; Klender; Jembatan Gantung; Rawa Buaya; Pinang Ranti; Kampung Rambutan; Pesing; Pamulang; Petukangan Selatan; Cipayung	Transjakarta		15	14.18 km	383,198,279
List of TransJakarta corridors#Corridor 14	Corridor 14	10 November 2023 (Note: Converted as BRT line)	23 August 2024	Jakarta International Stadium	Senen Raya	Bus rapid transit	Cipayung; Ciputat; Cakung; Cawang; Pulo Gadung; Cijantung; Cibubur; Klender; Kelapa Gading; Klender; Jembatan Gantung; Rawa Buaya; Pinang Ranti; Kampung Rambutan; Pesing; Pamulang; Petukangan Selatan; Cipayung	Transjakarta		10	9.7 km	383,198,279
Total										424	672.4 km	788,175,314
Planned/under construction lines
KAI Commuter Bogor Line	Bogor Line extension	TBA		Bogor	Sukabumi	Commuter rail (S-train)	Bukit Duri; Depok; Bogor; Manggarai	KAI Commuter	KRL Commuterline	11	57.3 Km	
	JIS Line	TBA		Jatinegara	Tanjung Priok	Commuter rail (S-train)	Bukit Duri; Depok; Bogor; Manggarai	KAI Commuter	KRL Commuterline	9	TBA	
KA Commuter Line Tanah Abang–Rangkasbitung	Rangkasbitung Line extension	TBA		Rangkasbitung	Merak	Commuter rail (S-train)	Bukit Duri; Depok; Bogor; Manggarai	KAI Commuter	KRL Commuterline	11	68.5 Km	
KAI Commuter Cikarang Loop Line	Cikarang Loop Line extension	TBA		Cikarang	Cikampek	Commuter rail (S-train)	Bukit Duri; Depok; Bogor; Manggarai	KAI Commuter	KRL Commuterline	8	41.0 Km	
MRT Line 1 (Jakarta Mass Rapid Transit)	North-South Line extension	Under construction		Bundaran HI Bank Jakarta	Kota	Rapid transit	Lebak Bulus	MRT Jakarta		7	5.8 km	
MRT Line 1 (Jakarta Mass Rapid Transit)	North-South Line extension	TBA		Kota	Ancol Marina	Rapid transit	Ancol Marina	MRT Jakarta		3	5.2 km	
MRT Line 1 (Jakarta Mass Rapid Transit)	North-South Line extension	TBA		Lebak Bulus	Parung	Rapid transit	Lebak Bulus	MRT Jakarta		TBA	18.0 km	
Jakarta MRT	East-West Line	Under Construction		Tomang	Medan Satria	Rapid transit	Rorotan Balaraja	MRT Jakarta		21	24.5 km	
Jakarta MRT	East-West Line	TBA		Tomang	Kembangan	Rapid transit	Rorotan Balaraja	MRT Jakarta		6	9.2 km	
Jakarta MRT	East-West Line	TBA		Kembangan	Balaraja	Rapid transit	Rorotan Balaraja	MRT Jakarta		14	29.9 km	
Jakarta MRT	East-West Line	TBA		Medan Satria	Cikarang	Rapid transit	Rorotan Balaraja	MRT Jakarta		8	20.5 km	
Jakarta MRT	Outer Ring Line	TBA		Kampung Rambutan	Fatmawati	Rapid transit	Kampung Rambutan	MRT Jakarta		10	12.0 km	
Jakarta MRT	Outer Ring Line	TBA		Fatmawati	Joglo	Rapid transit	Kampung Rambutan	MRT Jakarta		TBA	10.0 km	
Jakarta MRT	Outer Ring Line	TBA		Joglo	PIK	Rapid transit	Kampung Rambutan	MRT Jakarta		TBA	12.0 km	
Jakarta MRT	Outer Ring Line	TBA		PIK	Ancol	Rapid transit	Kampung Rambutan	MRT Jakarta		TBA	12.0 km	
Jakarta MRT	Outer Ring Line	TBA		Ancol	Semper Barat	Rapid transit	Kampung Rambutan	MRT Jakarta		TBA	12.0 km	
Jakarta MRT	Outer Ring Line	TBA		Semper Barat	Cakung	Rapid transit	Kampung Rambutan	MRT Jakarta		TBA	11.0 km	
Jakarta MRT	Outer Ring Line	TBA		Cakung	Kampung Rambutan	Rapid transit	Kampung Rambutan	MRT Jakarta		TBA	17.0 km	
LRT Line S (Jakarta LRT)	Southern Line extension	TBA		Manggarai	Dukuh Atas	Light metro	Pegangsaan Dua	LRT Jakarta		1	2.4 km	
LRT Line S (Jakarta LRT)	Southern Line extension	TBA		Dukuh Atas	Pesing	Light metro	Pegangsaan Dua	LRT Jakarta		13	12.3 km	
LRT Line S (Jakarta LRT)	Southern Line extension	TBA		Velodrome	Klender	Light metro	Pegangsaan Dua	LRT Jakarta		5	4.5 km	
LRT Line S (Jakarta LRT)	Southern Line extension	TBA		Klender	Halim	Light metro	Pegangsaan Dua	LRT Jakarta		4	4.9 km	
LRT Northern Line (Jakarta LRT)	Northern Line	TBA		Rajawali	Pesing	Light metro	Pegangsaan Dua	LRT Jakarta		6	8.9 km	
LRT Northern Line (Jakarta LRT)	Northern Line	TBA		Kelapa Gading	JIS	Light metro	Pegangsaan Dua	LRT Jakarta		6	8.9 km	
LRT Northern Line (Jakarta LRT)	Northern Line	TBA		JIS	Rajawali	Light metro	Pegangsaan Dua	LRT Jakarta		4	5.6 km	
LRT Line 1 (Greater Jakarta LRT)	Cibubur Line extension	TBA		Harjamukti	Baranangsiang	Light metro	Jati Mulya	KAI	LRT Jabodebek	4	6.0 km	
LRT Line 1 (Greater Jakarta LRT)	Cibubur Line extension	TBA		Senayan	Dukuh Atas BNI	Light metro	Jati Mulya	KAI	LRT Jabodebek	5	40.0 km	
LRT Line 3 (Greater Jakarta LRT)	Bekasi Line extension	TBA		Dukuh Atas BNI	Soekarno-Hatta	Light metro	Jati Mulya	KAI	LRT Jabodebek	9	45.2 km	
	PLGP LRT Line	TBA		Pulo Gebang	Joglo	Light metro	Pulo Gebang	TBA		TBA	TBA	

== Timeline ==
Year	Date	System	Line	Event	Length (km)	Station
2015	1 April	KAI Commuter Bogor Line	Bogor Line	Citayam - Nambo branch section extended	13.3 km (8.3 mi)	2
2017	1 April	KA Commuter Line Tanah Abang–Rangkasbitung	Rangkasbitung Line	Maja - Rangkasbitung section electrified and extended	17.1 km (10.6 mi)	2
2017	17 September	KAI Commuter Cikarang Loop Line	Cikarang Loop Line	Bekasi - Cikarang section electrified and extended	17.1 km (10.6 mi)	4
2017	31 December	Soekarno–Hatta Airport Rail Link	Soekarno-Hatta Line	SHIA - Manggarai section opened	54.3 km (33.7 mi)	6
2019	24 March	MRT Line 1 (Jakarta Mass Rapid Transit)	North-South Line	Lebak Bulus - Bundaran HI section opened	15.7 km (9.8 mi)	13
2019	1 December	LRT Line S (Jakarta LRT)	Southern Line	Pegangsaan - Velodrome section opened	5.8 km (3.6 mi)	6
2023	28 August	LRT Line 1 (Greater Jakarta LRT)	Cibubur Line	Dukuh Atas - Harjamukti section opened	25.9 km (16.1 mi)	12
2023	28 August	LRT Line 3 (Greater Jakarta LRT)	Bekasi Line	Dukuh Atas - Jatimulya section opened	29.5 km (18.3 mi)	14
2023	17 October	High-speed rail in Indonesia	Whoosh	Halim - Tegalluar section opened	142.85 km (88.76 mi)	3
2026	16 September	LRT Line S (Jakarta LRT)	Southern Line	Velodrome - Manggarai section opened	6.4 km (4.0 mi)	5
Under construction
2027	TBA	MRT Line 1 (Jakarta Mass Rapid Transit)	North-South Line	Bundaran HI - Monas section opened	3.0 km (1.9 mi)	2
2028	TBA	LRT Line S (Jakarta LRT)	Southern Line	Manggarai - Dukuh Atas section opened	2.4 km (1.5 mi)	1
2029	TBA	MRT Line 1 (Jakarta Mass Rapid Transit)	North-South Line	Monas - Kota section opened	2.8 km (1.7 mi)	4
2030	TBA	Jakarta MRT	East-West Line	Tomang - Medan Satria section opened	24.5 km (15.2 mi)	21

== Ridership ==
Line Code	Line Name	Annual Ridership				
Line Code	Line Name	2021	2022	2023	2024	2025
KAI Commuter Bogor Line	Bogor Line	123,125,911	215,049,396	290,890,677	334,361,011	155,009,997
KAI Commuter Cikarang Loop Line	Cikarang Loop Line	123,125,911	215,049,396	290,890,677	334,361,011	85,936,774
KA Commuter Line Tanah Abang–Rangkasbitung	Rangkasbitung Line	123,125,911	215,049,396	290,890,677	334,361,011	77,552,716
KA Commuter Line Duri–Tangerang	Tangerang Line	123,125,911	215,049,396	290,890,677	334,361,011	27,280,453
KA Commuter Line Jakarta Kota–Tanjung Priok	Tanjung Priok Line	123,125,911	215,049,396	290,890,677	334,361,011	3,531,311
Soekarno–Hatta Airport Rail Link	Soekarno-Hatta Line			1,963,711	2,380,704	2,347,314
MRT Line 1 (Jakarta Mass Rapid Transit)	North-South Line	7,175,595	19,780,000	33,500,000	39,910,100	45,479,391
LRT Line S (Jakarta LRT)	Southern Line	315,366	685,249	1,033,216	1,213,461	1,278,661
LRT Line 1 (Greater Jakarta LRT)	Cibubur Line				21,055,870	28,816,787
LRT Line 3 (Greater Jakarta LRT)	Bekasi Line				21,055,870	28,816,787
List of Transjakarta corridors#Corridor 1	Corridor 1	98,880,000	191,400,000	280,000,000	383,198,279	414,346,167
List of Transjakarta corridors#Corridor 2	Corridor 2	98,880,000	191,400,000	280,000,000	383,198,279	414,346,167
List of Transjakarta corridors#Corridor 3	Corridor 3	98,880,000	191,400,000	280,000,000	383,198,279	414,346,167
List of Transjakarta corridors#Corridor 4	Corridor 4	98,880,000	191,400,000	280,000,000	383,198,279	414,346,167
List of Transjakarta corridors#Corridor 5	Corridor 5	98,880,000	191,400,000	280,000,000	383,198,279	414,346,167
List of TransJakarta corridors#Corridor 6	Corridor 6	98,880,000	191,400,000	280,000,000	383,198,279	414,346,167
List of TransJakarta corridors#Corridor 7	Corridor 7	98,880,000	191,400,000	280,000,000	383,198,279	414,346,167
List of TransJakarta corridors#Corridor 8	Corridor 8	98,880,000	191,400,000	280,000,000	383,198,279	414,346,167
List of TransJakarta corridors#Corridor 9	Corridor 9	98,880,000	191,400,000	280,000,000	383,198,279	414,346,167
List of TransJakarta corridors#Corridor 10	Corridor 10	98,880,000	191,400,000	280,000,000	383,198,279	414,346,167
List of TransJakarta corridors#Corridor 11	Corridor 11	98,880,000	191,400,000	280,000,000	383,198,279	414,346,167
List of TransJakarta corridors#Corridor 12	Corridor 12	98,880,000	191,400,000	280,000,000	383,198,279	414,346,167
List of TransJakarta corridors#Corridor 13	Corridor 13	98,880,000	191,400,000	280,000,000	383,198,279	414,346,167
List of TransJakarta corridors#Corridor 14	Corridor 14	98,880,000	191,400,000	280,000,000	383,198,279	414,346,167
Total		229,416,872	426,229,396	607,387,604	780,905,964	839,232,257

== Rolling stock ==
Line Code	Line Name	Formation	In service On order	Rolling Stock	Manufacturers	Image
MRT Line 1 (Jakarta Mass Rapid Transit)	North-South Line	6 carriage EMU	16 trainsets (96 car); 8 trainsets (48 car)	MRTJ 1000 series	(Japan) Nippon Sharyo	
KAI Commuter Bogor Line	Bogor Line	12 carriage EMU	4 trainsets (48 car); 12 trainsets (144 car)	CLI-225 series	(Indonesia) PT INKA	
KAI Commuter Cikarang Loop Line	Cikarang Loop Line	12 carriage EMU	11 trainsets (132 car)	CLI-125 series	(China) CRRC Qingdao Sifang	
KA Commuter Line Tanah Abang–Rangkasbitung	Rangkasbitung Line	8-12 carriage EMU	130 trainsets (1068 car)	see here	Nippon Sharyo, Kawasaki Heavy Industries, Hitachi, Ltd., Kinki Sharyo, Japan Transport Engineering Company	
KA Commuter Line Duri–Tangerang	Tangerang Line	8-12 carriage EMU	130 trainsets (1068 car)	see here	Nippon Sharyo, Kawasaki Heavy Industries, Hitachi, Ltd., Kinki Sharyo, Japan Transport Engineering Company	
KA Commuter Line Jakarta Kota–Tanjung Priok	Tanjung Priok Line	8-12 carriage EMU	130 trainsets (1068 car)	see here	Nippon Sharyo, Kawasaki Heavy Industries, Hitachi, Ltd., Kinki Sharyo, Japan Transport Engineering Company	
LRT Line 1 (Greater Jakarta LRT)	Cibubur Line	6 carriage EMU	27 trainsets (162 car)	INKA Class	(Indonesia) PT INKA	
LRT Line 3 (Greater Jakarta LRT)	Bekasi Line	6 carriage EMU	27 trainsets (162 car)	INKA Class	(Indonesia) PT INKA	
LRT Line S (Jakarta LRT)	South Line	2 carriage EMU	8 trainsets (16 car)	Hyundai Rotem LRV	(South Korea) Hyundai Rotem	
	Airport Railink	6 carriage EMU	10 trainsets (60 car)	EA203	(Indonesia) PT INKA	
High-speed rail in Indonesia	Whoosh	8 carriage EMU	11 trainsets (88 car)	KCIC400AF	(China) CRRC Qingdao Sifang	
TransJakarta	Transjakarta	Single-deck bus	4,487 electric, CNG, diessel bus	see here	(Sweden) (Germany) (China) Scania AB, Mercedes-Benz, Zhongtong, BYD, Skywell, Volvo	

== See also ==
- Jak Lingko
- Jakarta MRT
- Jabodebek LRT
- Jakarta LRT
- KRL Commuterline
- Soekarno–Hatta Airport Rail Link
- TransJakarta
