= Sunter Kelapa Gading (Transjakarta) =

Bus rapid transit station in Jakarta, Indonesia

10 06 12 17 Sunter Kelapa Gading
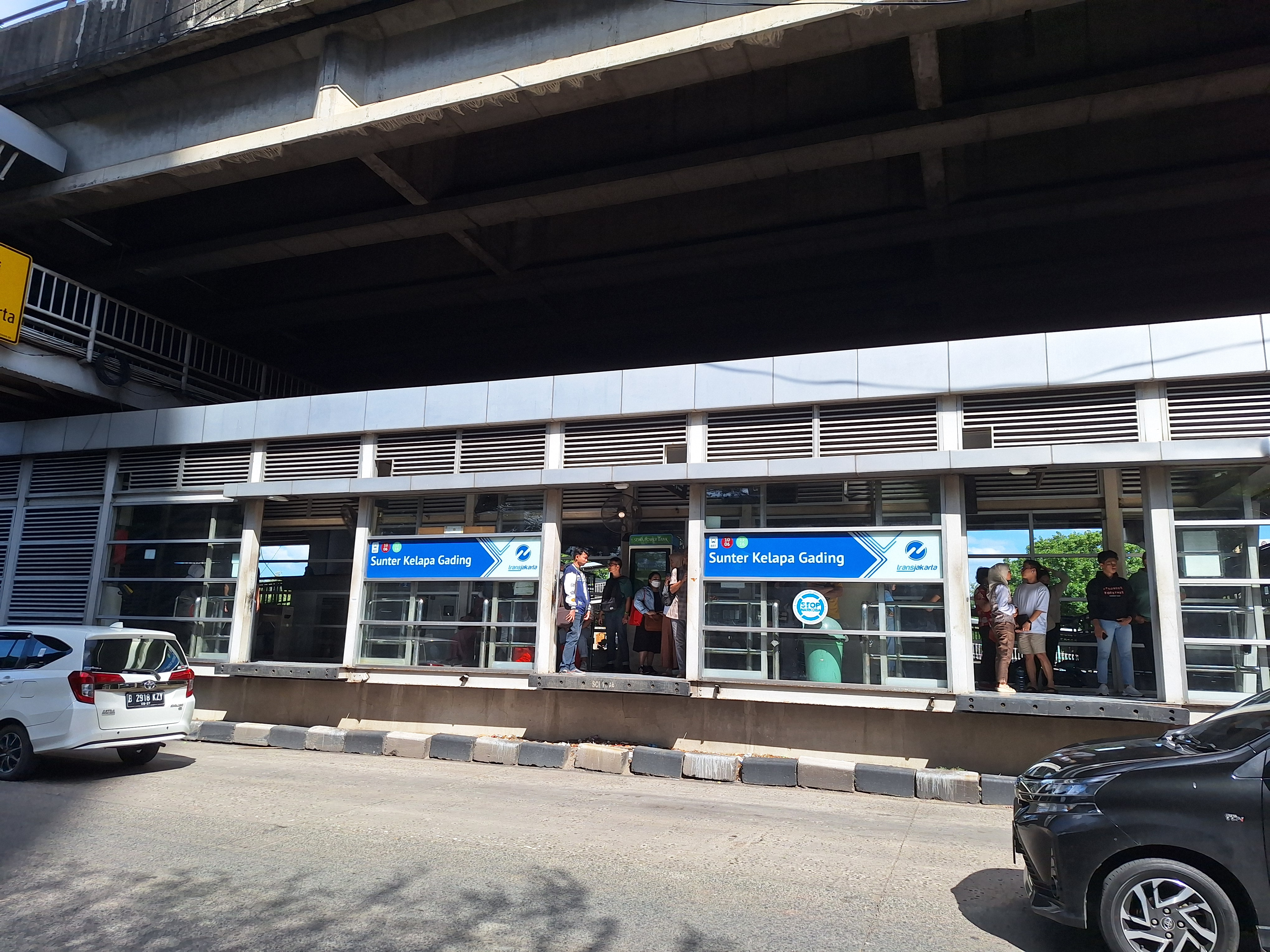

General information
- Other names: Sunter
- Location: Laksamana Yos Sudarso Street, Sunter Jaya, Tanjung Priok, North Jakarta 14350, Indonesia
- Coordinates: 6.142723°S 106.89072°E
- System: Transjakarta bus rapid transit station
- Owner: Transjakarta
- Operator: Transjakarta
- Lines: List of TransJakarta corridors#Corridor 10 List of TransJakarta corridors#Corridor 12

Construction
- Structure type: At-grade
- Cycle facilities: No
- Accessible: No

Other information
- Status: In service

History
- Opened: 31 December 2010

Services
Preceding		Following
Plumpang towards Tanjung Priok	Corridor 10	Kodamar towards PGC
Sunter Boulevard Barat towards Pluit	Corridor 12 05:00-22:00	Plumpang towards Tanjung Priok
Sunter Boulevard Barat towards Penjaringan	Corridor 12 Terminus; 22:00-05:00	Terminus
Location

Sunter Kelapa Gading (often referred to as simply Sunter) is a Transjakarta bus rapid transit station located on Laksamana Yos Sudarso Street, Sunter Jaya, Tanjung Priok, North Jakarta, Indonesia. It is an interchange station serving both Corridor 10 and Corridor 12.

== History ==
The station opened on 31 December 2010, on the opening day of Corridors 9 and 10. Later, corridor 12 began service in on 12 February 2013, and caters this station.

On 12 August 2019, Transjakarta decided to shorten Corridor 12's service route and make all eastbound buses terminate at this station. The original route was reinstated in 2021. However, to this day, the vast majority of Corridor 12 buses still terminate at this station, and very few continue to Tanjung Priok. The overnight service, commenced in 2022, terminates at this station.

== Station layout ==
West	Terminating arrivals	towards Pluit	towards Tanjung Priok	↑ (Sunter Karya)
(Plumpang) →
(Sunter Boulevard Barat) ↩
Side platform, doors open on the right side
Side platform, doors open on the right side
East	← (Kodamar) towards PGC

== Non-BRT bus services ==
Type	Route	Destination	Notes
Inner city feeder		Cibubur → Tanjung Priok	Inside the station
Inner city feeder		Pegangsaan Dua LRT station—Jakarta International Stadium	Inside the station
Mikrotrans Jak Lingko	JAK 24	Terminal Senen—Pulo Gadung Terminal via Kelapa Gading	Outside the station
Mikrotrans Jak Lingko	JAK 60	Kemayoran Housing Complex—Kelapa Gading	Outside the station
Mikrotrans Jak Lingko	JAK 87	Tanjung Priok Terminal—Rawamangun Terminal	Outside the station

== Places of interest ==
- Mall Artha Gading

== Gallery ==
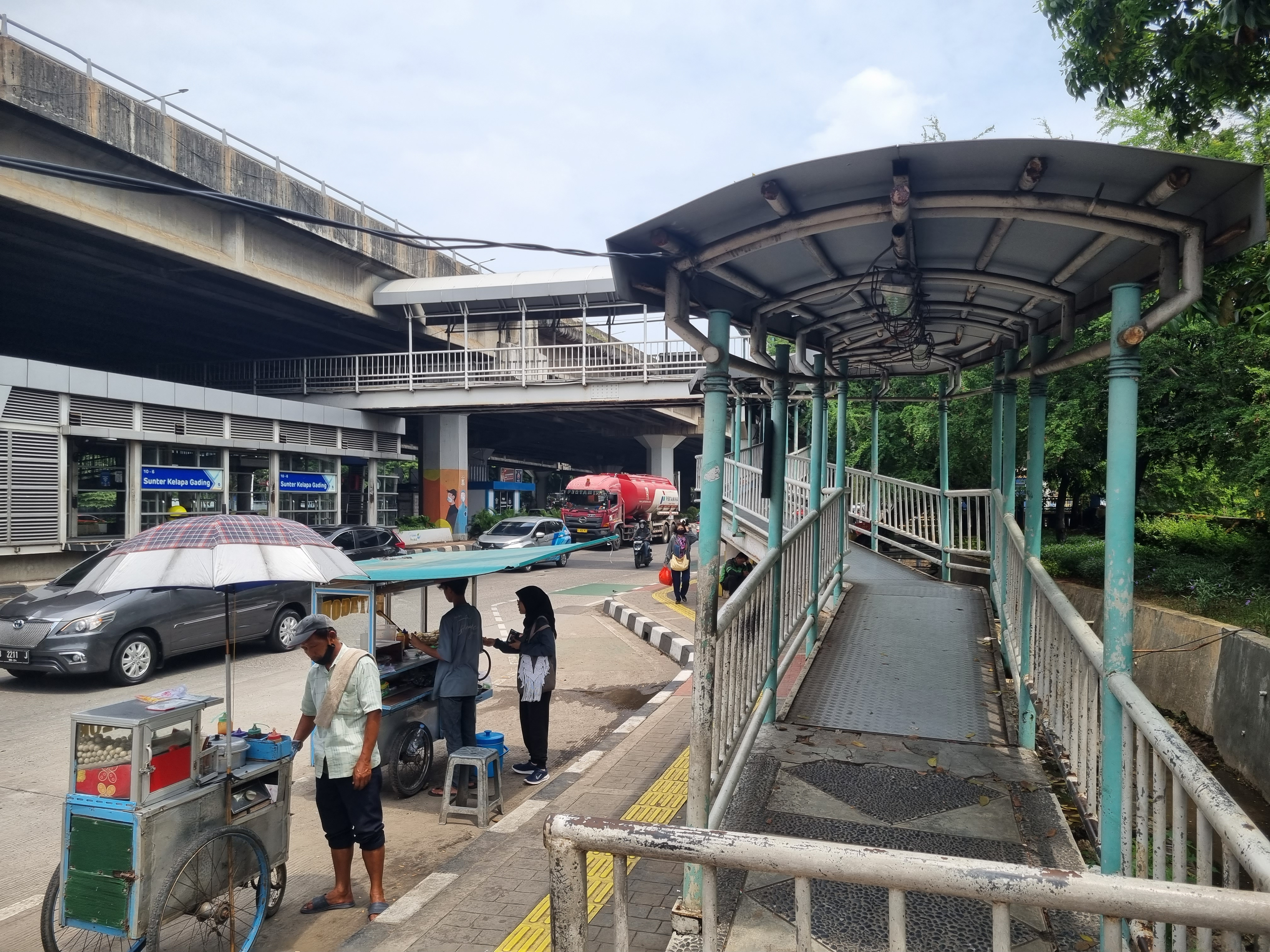
Skybridge access to the station

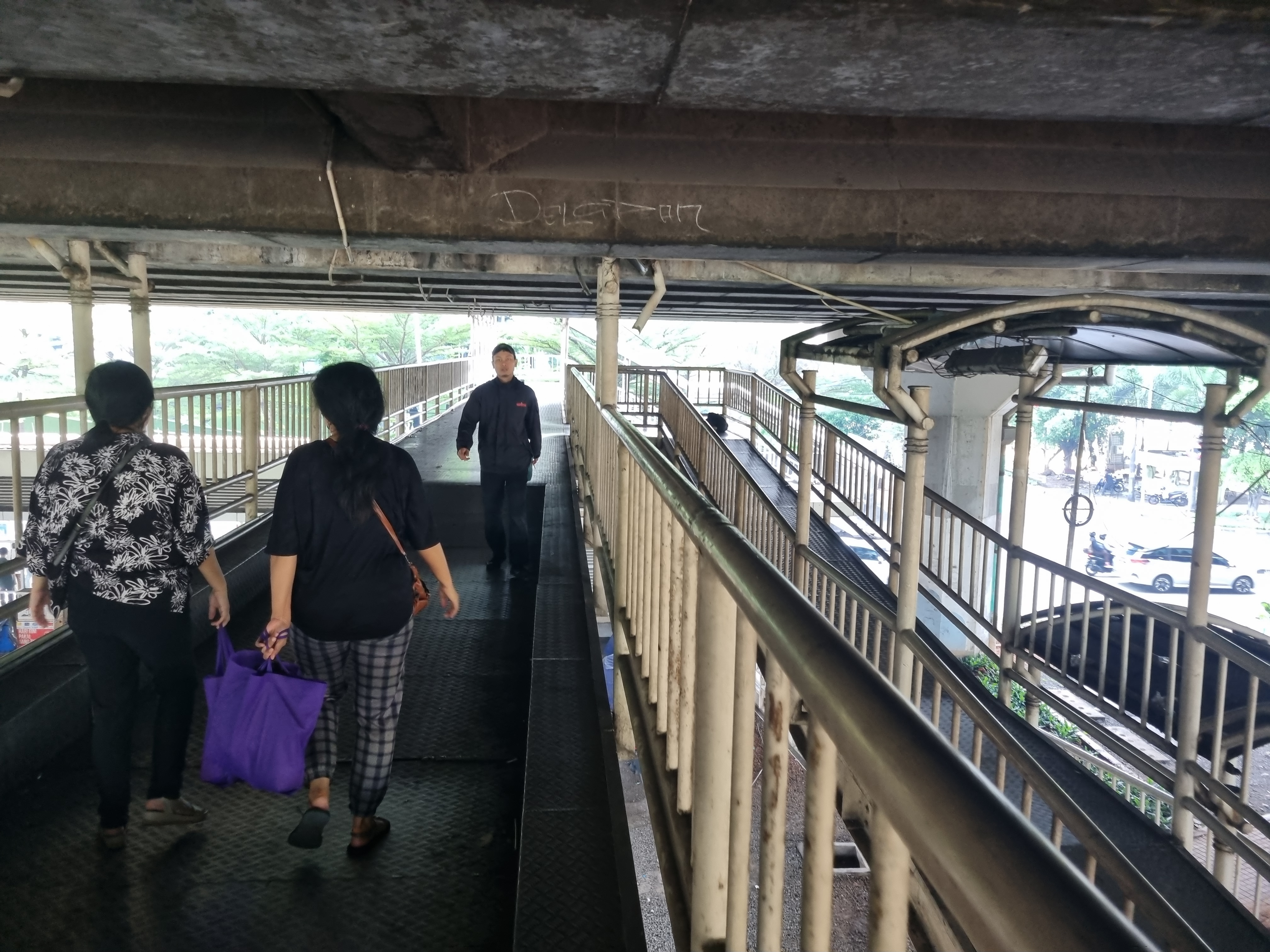
View of the skybridge beneath the Inner Ring Road

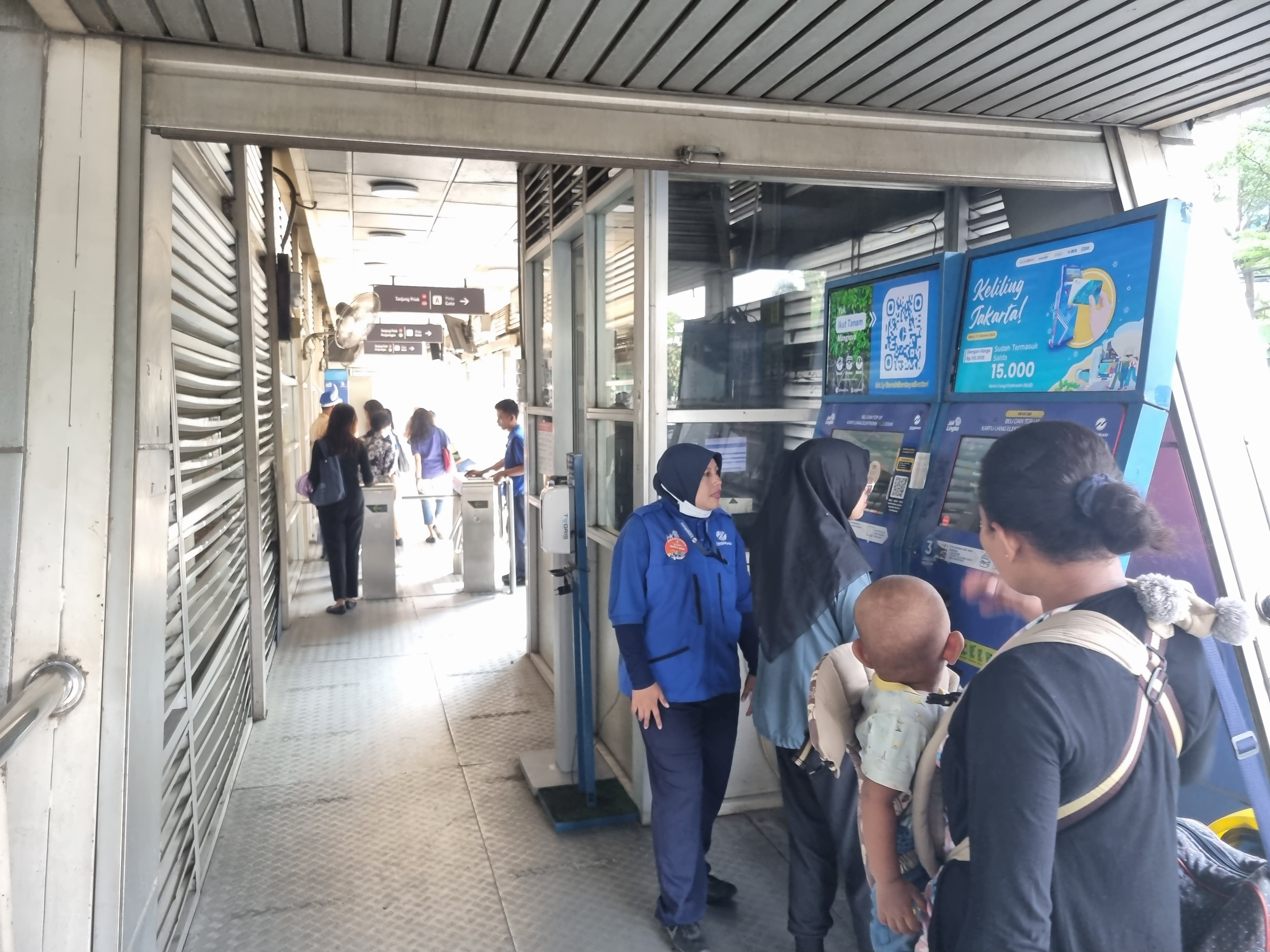
Ticket concourse

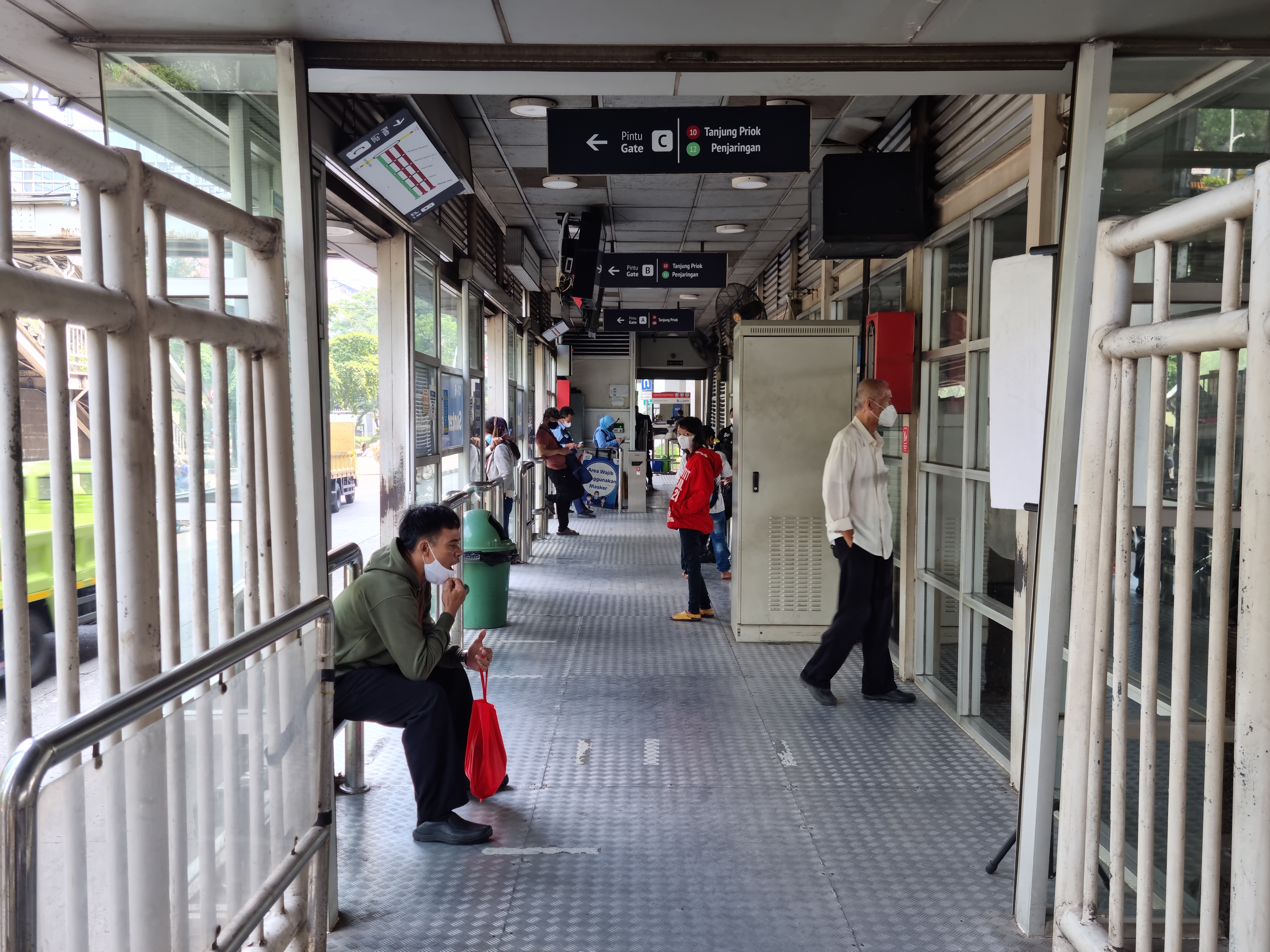
Western platform serving northbound buses

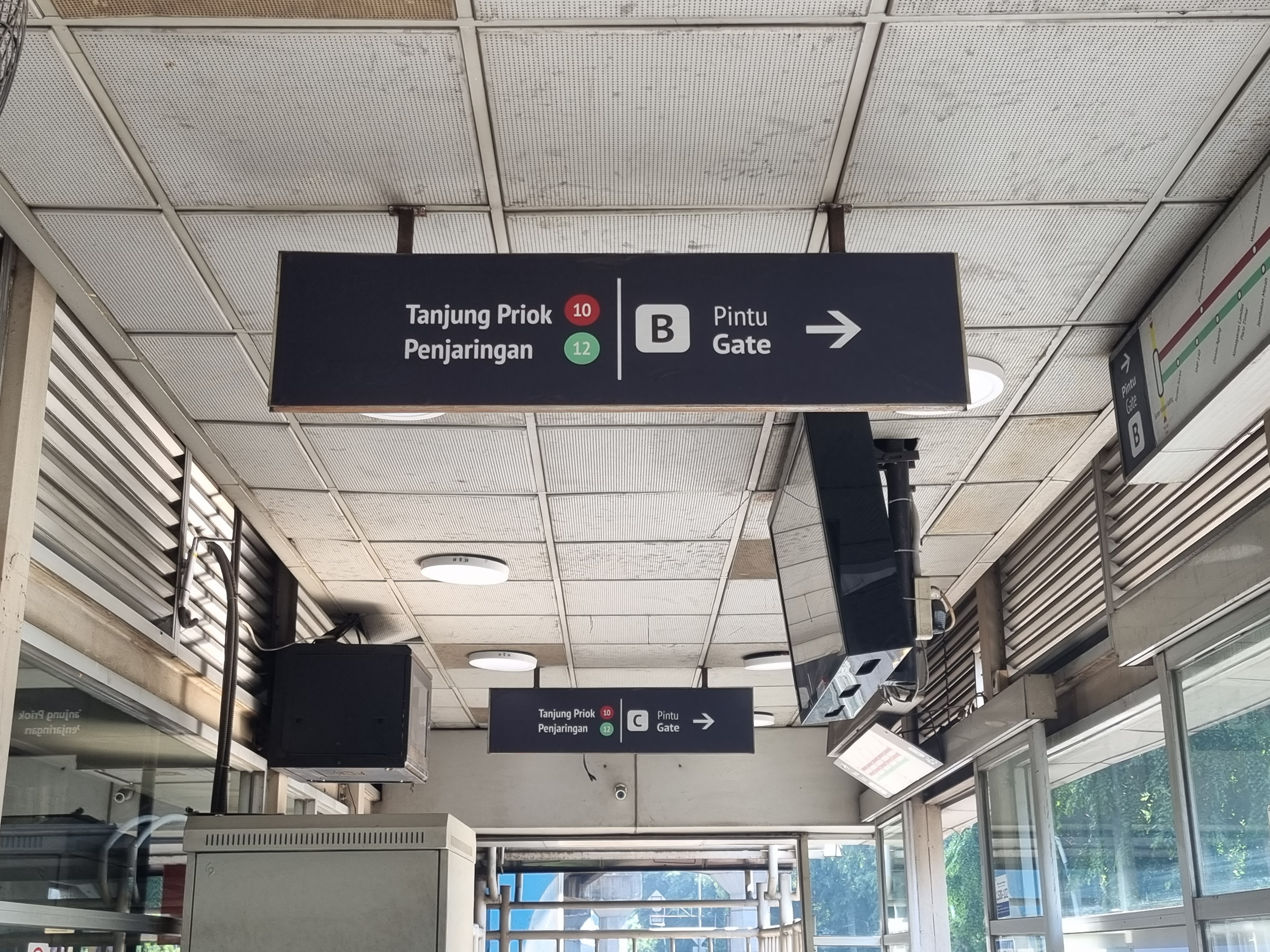
Western platform signage

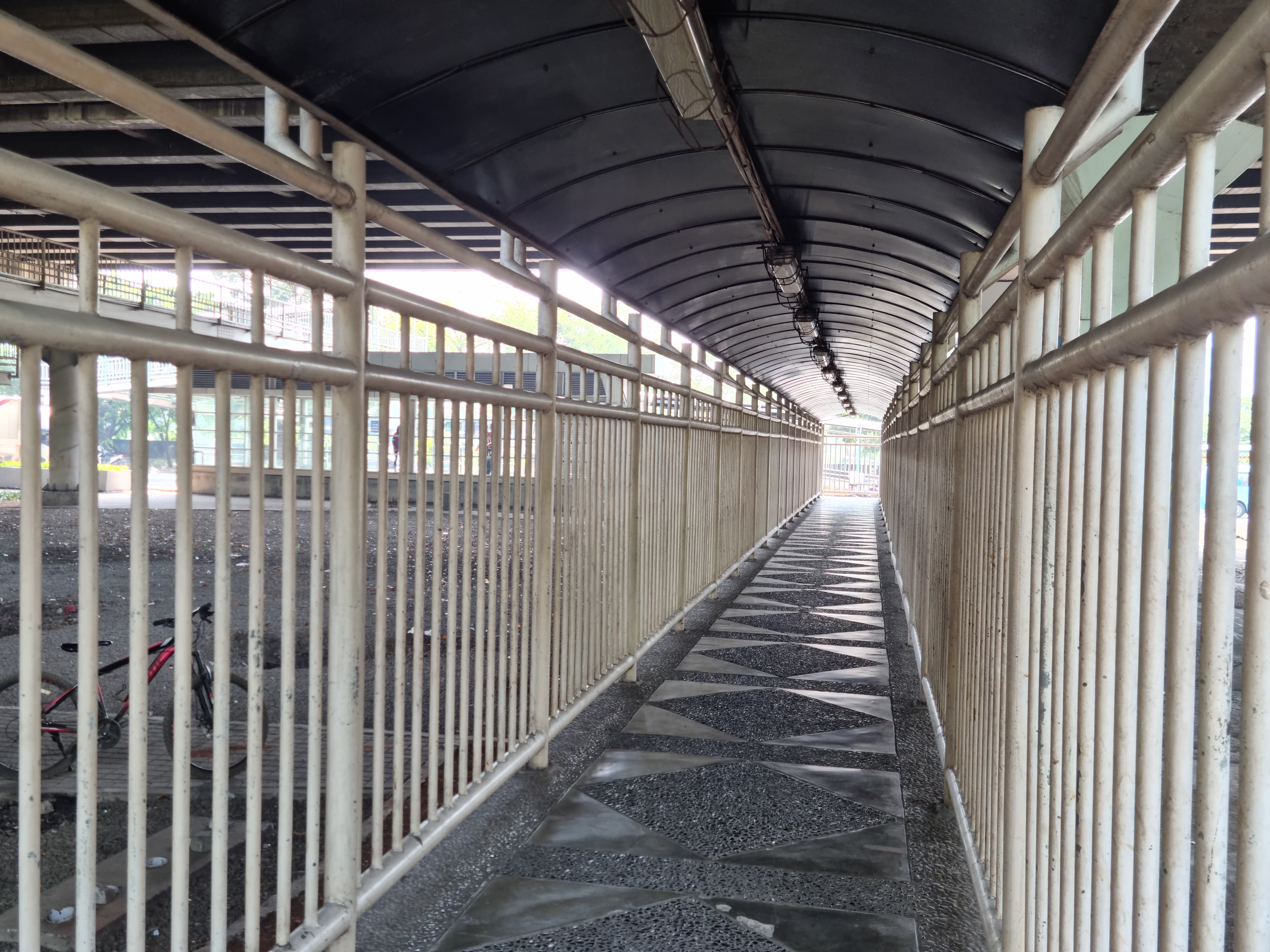
Connecting linkway

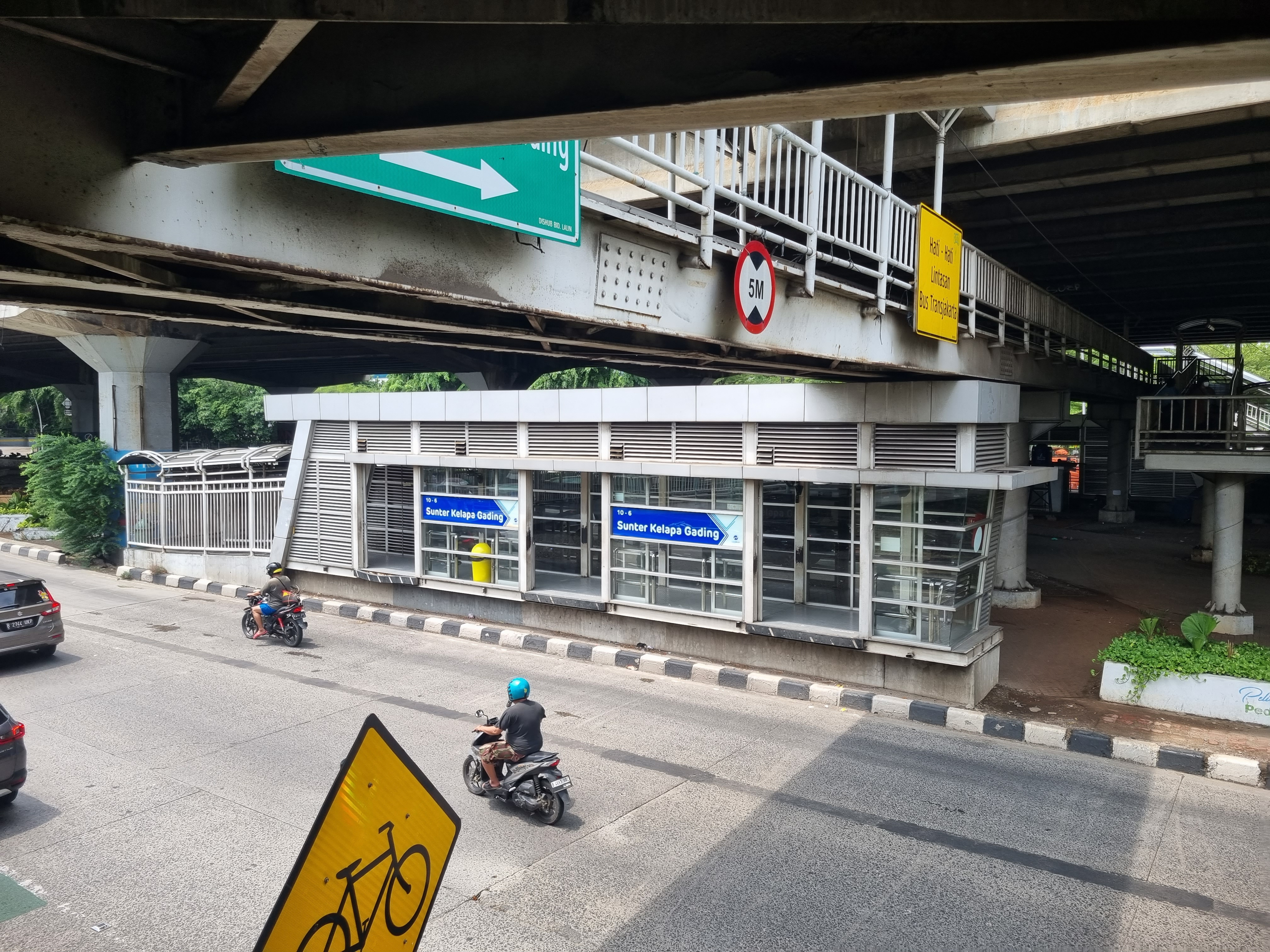
Eastern side

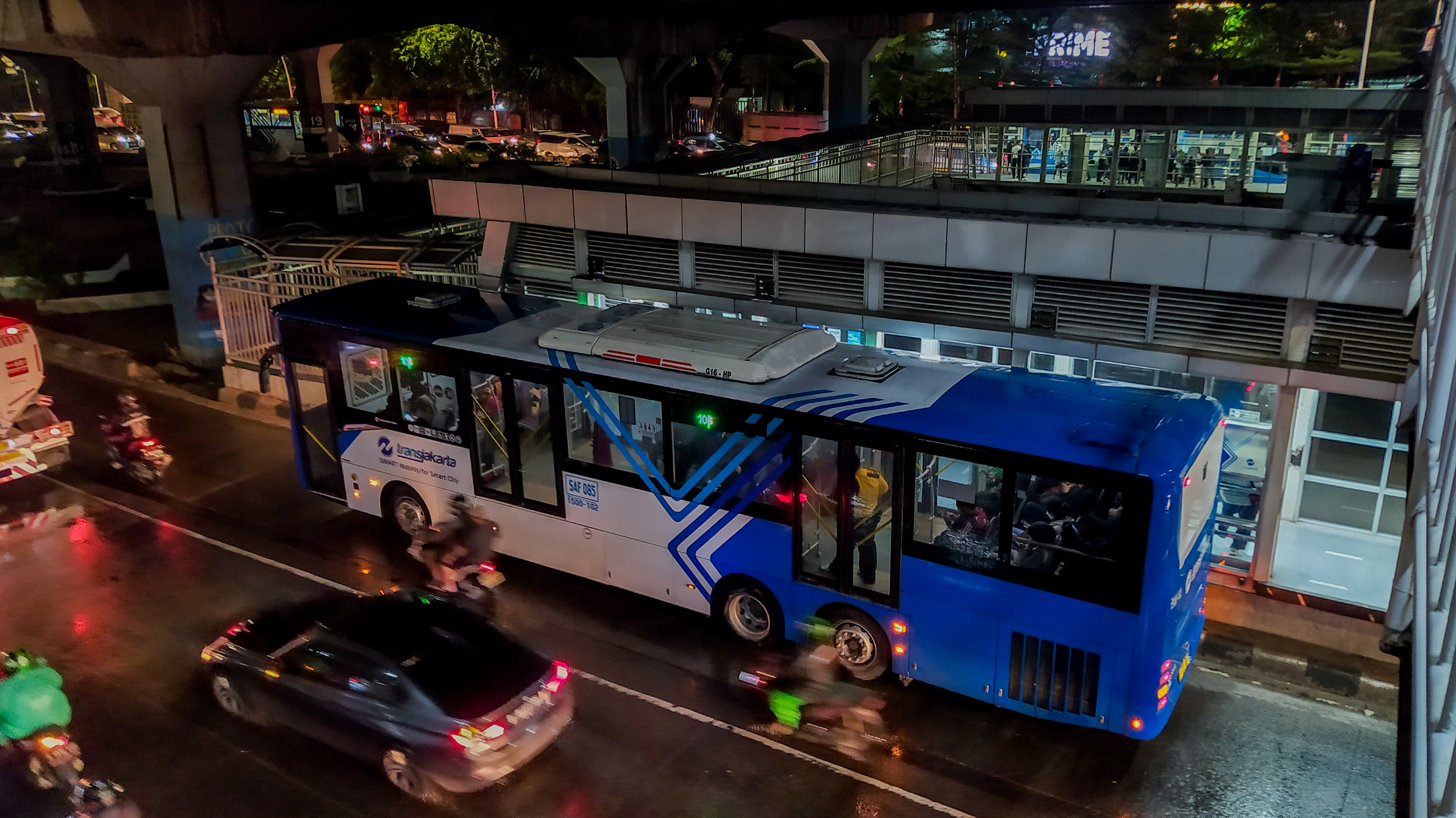
Southbound Corridor 10 bus arriving at the eastern platform
