= Samuel Mulia =

Indonesian writer, brand consultant and fashion designer

Samuel Mulia (16 January 1963 – 25 June 2022) was a Chinese Indonesian writer, branding consultant, and fashion designer.

== Personal life and education ==
He was born in Denpasar on January 13, 1963. Since childhood, he exhibited an effeminate personality, enjoying playing with makeup. He realized his attraction to men during his high school years. He stopped his education in Faculty of Medicine Udayana University on the third year, before he decided to move to France to learn about fashion. He never had relationships with other men until he came back to Jakarta after moving to France. While living in Jakarta, he sought relationships using the internet as his mode of dating. However, after he was afflicted by kidney failure in 2005 and taken to a hospital in Guangzhou, he began to think that his sexuality was a disease and attended regular testimonials at church. Despite this, he never denied his sexuality as a gay man.

== Career ==
His career began in 1989 when he started working at Femina Group. In November 1991, he started working on their first publication, Dewi, a high-fashion magazine, contributing to its "Mode" column. He worked as editor during the period of 1993 till 2004. He was main writer of the 'Parodi' column in Kompas, which contained social critiques about urban life. This position was recommended by Bre Redana, an Indonesian writer, to Ninuk Mardiana Pambudy, an Indonesian journalist and editor at Kompas.

== Death ==
He was died on 25 June 2022 due to his kidney disease in his apartment that was located in Semanggi, Central Jakarta. He was cremated and buried in Rumah Duka Grand Heaven that located in Pluit, North Jakarta on 30 June 2025.
