= Pluit (Transjakarta) =

Bus rapid transit station in Jakarta, Indonesia

9 26 12 01 Pluit
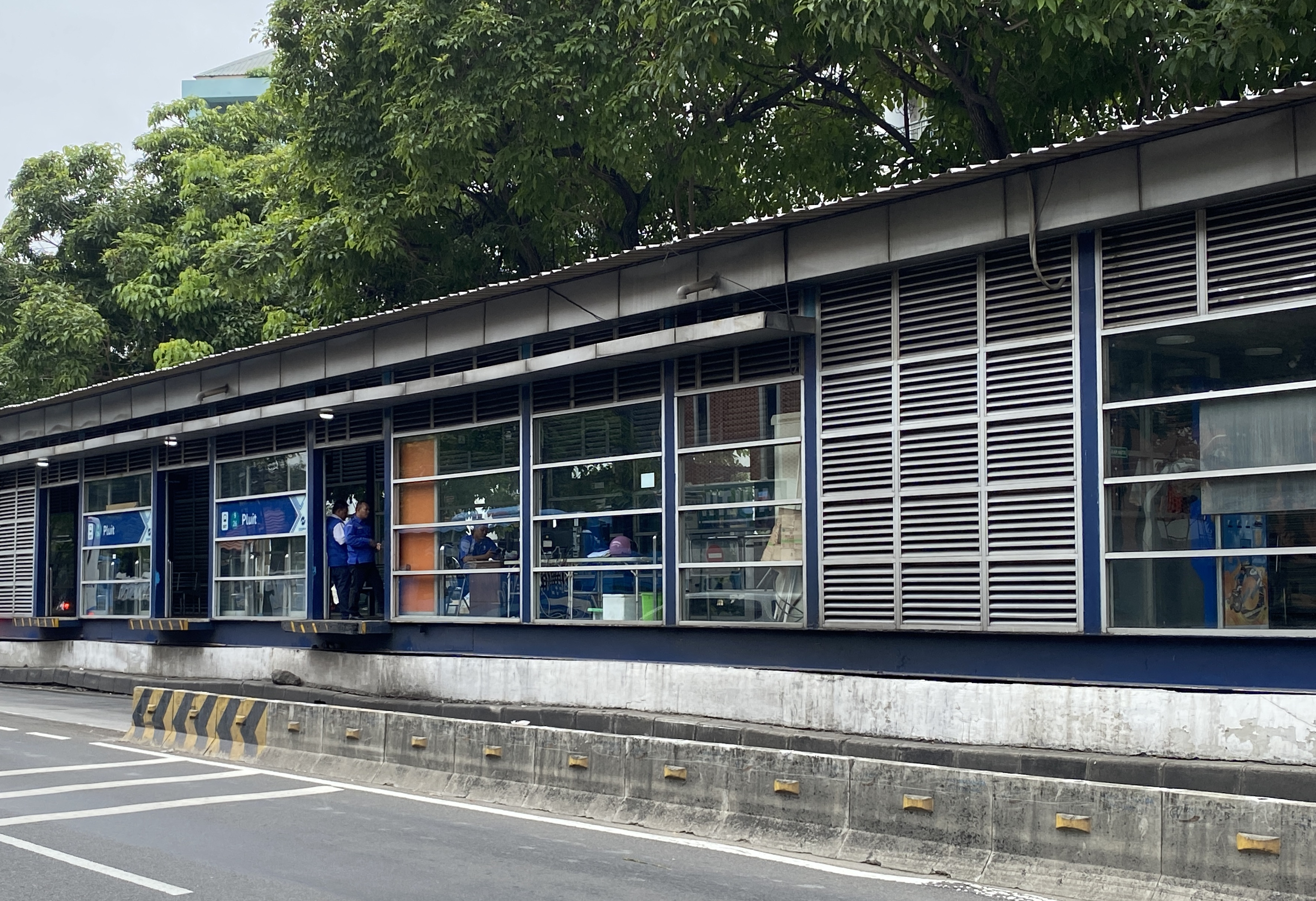

General information
- Location: Pluit Permai Street, Pluit, Penjaringan, North Jakarta 14450, Indonesia
- Coordinates: 6.1156°S 106.7895°E
- System: Transjakarta bus rapid transit station
- Owner: Transjakarta
- Operator: Transjakarta
- Lines: List of TransJakarta corridors#Corridor 9 List of TransJakarta corridors#Corridor 12
- Platforms: Two island platforms with separate paid area per platform

Construction
- Structure type: At-grade

Other information
- Status: In service

History
- Opened: 31 December 2010

Services
Preceding		Following
Penjaringan towards Pinang Ranti	Corridor 9 Terminus	Terminus
Penjaringan One-way operation	Corridor 12 Terminus; 05:00-22:00	Pluit Selatan towards Tanjung Priok
Location

Pluit is a Transjakarta bus rapid transit station located on Pluit Permai Street, Pluit, Penjaringan, North Jakarta, Indonesia. It is the northwestern terminus of Corridor 9 and the western terminus of Corridor 12. It is one of the few stations of Corridor 9 whose name has not been changed since opening.

On 25 July 2015, Transjakarta shortened Corridor 12 to terminate at Penjaringan station; thus, this station ceased to serve Corridor 12. However, on 18 December 2021, Transjakarta reinstated the original Corridor 12 route, and the station began serving Corridor 12 again. However, to this day, the vast majority of Corridor 12 buses only serve the axis route Penjaringan—Sunter Kelapa Gading, and as such, very few of which actually terminate here.

To this day, nighttime AMARI service of Corridor 12 terminates at Penjaringan. This station is only served by Corridor 9 at night.

== Building and layout ==
This station, like some other terminus stations, has a separate paid area for each departure and arrival platform, requiring paying again to transfer.

East	Arrivals	Waiting area	towards Pinang Ranti and towards Tanjung Priok (Penjaringan/Pluit Selatan) →
Island platform, doors open on the right		Linkway	Island platform, doors open on the right
West		↓	Access to Pluit Village

== Non-BRT bus services ==
Type	Route	Destination	Notes
Inner city feeder		Pantai Maju—Balai Kota	Outside the station
Inner city feeder		Arrivals only from Cibubur Junction	Inside the station
Inner city feeder		Kota—Kaliadem	Outside the station
Inner city feeder		Pluit—Senen via Pasar Ikan—Muara Karang	Outside the station
Mikrotrans Jak Lingko	JAK 120	Jakarta International Stadium—Muara Angke	Outside the station

== Places nearby ==
- Pluit Village
