= The Regatta Jakarta =

The Regata
- Interactive map of the The Regata area

General information
- Type: Hotel; Residential
- Architectural style: Modern
- Location: Jalan Raya Pantai Mutiara Blok TG 1D, Pluit, Jakarta, Indonesia
- Coordinates: 6.095343°S 106.792192°E
- Construction started: 2009

Technical details
- Floor count: 40 floors x 1; 24 floors x 10

Design and construction
- Architects: WS Atkins, UK
- Developer: Badan Kerjasama Mutiara Buana (BKMB)
- Structural engineer: Davy Sukamta & Partners
- Main contractor: PT Total Bangun Persada Tbk.

The Regatta is a mixed development complex of 11 skyscrapers overlooking the Java Sea at Pluit, Jakarta, Indonesia. The complex has a land area of about 11 hectares. There is a 2.4 hectares aqua park within the complex.

The tallest of the towers is a hotel building, which is 163 meters tall and 40 floors above the ground. The concept of the development follows a nautical theme, the centerpiece of which being an aerodynamically shaped hotel overlooking the Java Sea with chic lines is a series of 10 apartment towers of same design, symbolizing of tall ships sailing around the ‘lighthouse’ represented by the hotel, which gave to the name ‘Regatta’. The development won FIABCI (International Real Estate Federation) Prix d'Excellence Awards in 2010.

All apartment towers are named after major port cities of the world and are each orientated towards the cardinal direction of their corresponding city.

Rank	Name	Height m	Floors	Year	Notes
1	Regatta Hotel	163	40	2020	Under Construction
2	Dubai Tower	107	24	2009	Completed
3	Monte Carlo Tower	107	24	2009	Completed
4	Rio de Janeiro Tower	107	24	2009	Completed
5	Miami Tower	107	24	2009	Completed
6	London Tower	98	24	2017	Completed
7	New York Tower	98	24	2017	Completed
8	Shanghai Tower	98	24	2017	Completed/Finishing On-hold
9	Sydney Tower	98	24	N/A	Under Construction
10	Tokyo Tower	98	24	N/A	Under Construction
11	Acapulco Tower	98	24	N/A	Under Construction

== See also ==
- Pluit
- North Jakarta
- Java Sea
