= Pluit Village =

- Location: Pluit, Penjaringan, North Jakarta, Indonesia
- Coordinates: 6.126335°S 106.791283°E
- Address: Jl. Pluit Indah Raya
- Opened: June 8, 1996 with the name Megamall Pluit; December 1, 2008 - Now under the name Pluit Village
- Developer: Lippo Karawaci TBK
- Manager: Lippo Karawaci TBK
- Num. of stores: 250
- Num. of anchor tenants: 5
- Floor area: 17,138 m^{2} (184,470 sq ft)
- Floors: 5 (retail), 2 (parking)
- Parking: 2300 car, 2150 motor bike
- Public transit: Pluit
- Website: www.pluitvillagemall.com

Pluit Village is a shopping center located on Jl. Pluit Indah Raya, Pluit, Penjaringan, North Jakarta, Indonesia.

Built on an area of 21 hectares (52 acres) with lakeside view, Pluit village is a shopping center which was previously known as Mega Mall Pluit. Then in 2008, PT. Lippo Karawaci Tbk entered as a new manager and this mall was renamed Pluit Village. Some of the famous tenants in this mall include Matahari department Store, Carrefour, Best Denki, Muji Timezone, Amazone, Playtopia, Cinépolis, Anytime Fitness, and MR. DIY.

The Mall is located on Jl. Pluit Indah Raya and has a strategic location as it is close to arterial road and toll gate. Pluit Village has a large parking area that can accommodate 2300 cars and 2150 motorcycles.

== See also ==
- List of shopping malls in Indonesia
