= Emporium Mall Pluit =

Emporium Mall
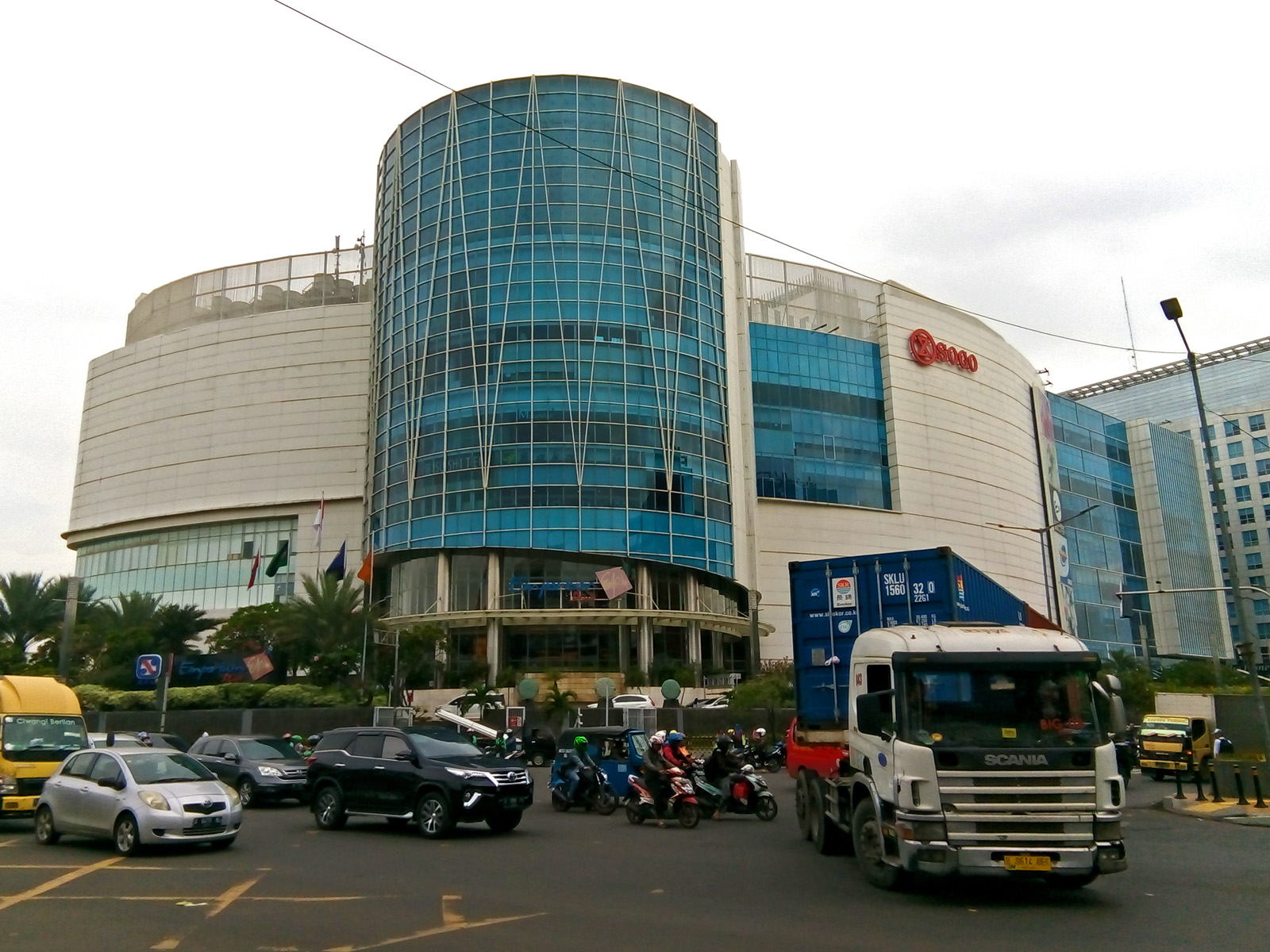
- Emporium Pluit, 2018
- Location: Pluit, Jakarta, Indonesia
- Coordinates: 6.127589°S 106.790735°E
- Address: Jl. Pluit South Raya, Pluit, Penjaringan, North Jakarta
- Opened: January 10, 2009
- Developer: Agung Podomoro Land
- Num. of stores: 250
- Num. of anchor tenants: 5
- Floor area: 61,243 m^{2} (659,210 sq ft)
- Floors: 5 (retail) 3 (parking)
- Public transit: Penjaringan
- Website: emporiumpluit.com

Emporium Mall is a shopping mall located at Pluit, Jakarta, Indonesia. Emporium Pluit developed by PT. Pluit Propertindo a subsidiary of Agung Podomoro Land. The mall is located at Pluit Selatan Raya Road and Jembatan Tiga Road, in North Jakarta. This location was previously complex Sasana Krida Sports Complex.

Emporium Pluit Mall was officially opened to the public on January 17, 2009. This mall is part of the 10 hectare CBD Pluit superblock consisting of malls, condominiums, housing, office buildings and a hotel.

This mall has a floor area of 61,243 m^{2} (659,210 sq ft) consisting of 2 basement floors, 5 main floors, and 3 floors for indoor parking area. The main tenants are Carrefour hypermarkets and Sogo department store. Some other tenants include: Gramedia, Emporium Pluit XXI, Electronic Solution, BreadTalk, J.CO, Ace Hardware and Starbucks. The food court area is located on the 4th floor, but there are also several restaurants on the other floors. The Holiday Inn Express hotel is located on top of the Emporium Pluit Mall.

== See also ==
- List of shopping malls in Indonesia
