= Penjaringan (Transjakarta) =

Bus rapid transit station in Jakarta, Indonesia

9 25 12 25 Penjaringan
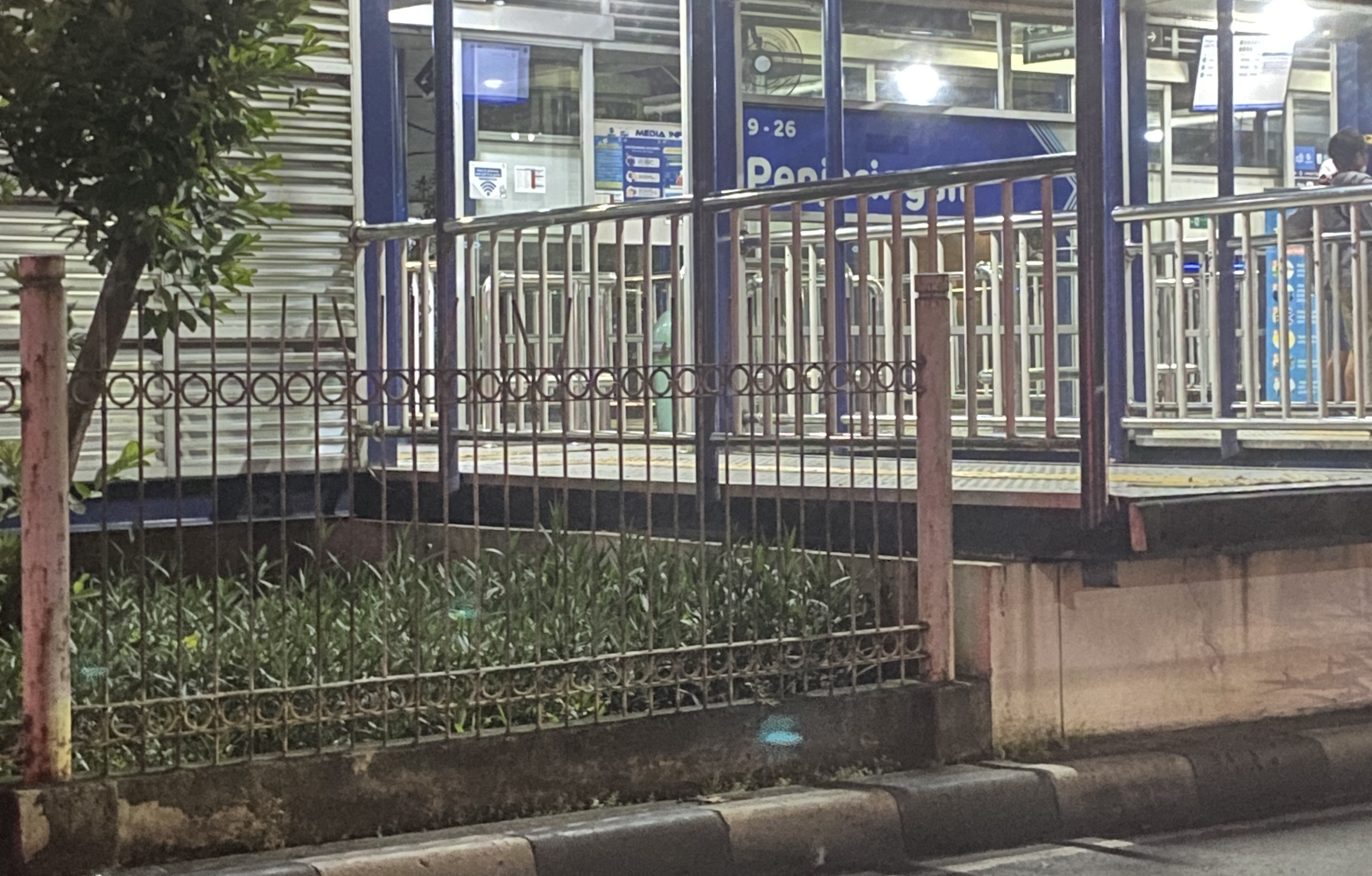

General information
- Location: Pluit Raya Street, Penjaringan, Penjaringan, North Jakarta 14440, Indonesia
- Coordinates: 6.1263°S 106.7920°E
- System: Transjakarta bus rapid transit station
- Owner: Transjakarta
- Operator: Transjakarta
- Lines: List of TransJakarta corridors#Corridor 9 List of TransJakarta corridors#Corridor 12
- Platforms: Single island platform

Construction
- Structure type: At-grade

Other information
- Status: In service

History
- Opened: 31 December 2010

Services
Preceding		Following
Jembatan Tiga towards Pinang Ranti	Corridor 9	Pluit Terminus
Pluit Terminus	Corridor 12 05:00-22:00	Bandengan One-way operation
Bandengan One-way operation	Corridor 12 Terminus; 22:00-05:00	Pluit Selatan towards Sunter Kelapa Gading
Location

Penjaringan is a Transjakarta bus rapid transit station located on Pluit Raya Street, Penjaringan, Penjaringan, North Jakarta, serving Corridors 9 and 12. It is also the western terminus of the nighttime service of Corridor 12 (22:00 to 05:00 the following day).

== History ==
The station opened on 31 December 2010 on the day Corridor 9 began passenger service. The station is one of the five Corridor 9 stations that have never been renamed.

On 25 July 2015, Transjakarta decided to remove Pluit station from Corridor 12's route, thus making this station the terminus, with buses going straight to Landmark Auto Plaza (now Pluit Selatan) station. In 2021, Transjakarta reextended the line to Pluit. However, the majority of Corridor 12 buses today only serve the axis route Penjaringan–Sunter Kelapa Gading, which was its route from 2019 to 2021, and as such, only a few buses actually serve this station towards Pluit.

Today, Corridor 12's late-night AMARI service continues to terminate at this station, without going to Pluit.

== Building and layout ==
On the official map, Penjaringan station officially only serves westbound Corridor 12 buses terminating at Pluit. However, because most Corridor 12 buses only serve the axis route, the vast majority of Corridor 12 buses here terminate or turn around to serve the eastbound direction.

East	towards Pinang Ranti and towards Sunter Kelapa Gading/Tanjung Priok (Jembatan Tiga/Pluit Selatan)→
Island platform, doors open on the right
West	← (Pluit) towards Pluit

== Non-BRT bus services ==
The following non-BRT bus services serve areas around Penjaringan station, last updated on 21 February 2026:

Type	Route	Destination	Notes
Inner city feeder		Balai Kota—Pantai Maju	Inside the station
Inner city feeder		Penjaringan—Taman Kota	Inside the station
Inner city feeder		Cibubur → Pluit	Inside the station
Inner city feeder		Kota—Kaliadem	Inside the station
Rental apartment feeder		Kapuk Muara Housing Complex → Tambora Housing Complex	Inside the station
Rental apartment feeder		Pluit Reservoir Housing Complex—Penjaringan Housing Complex	Inside the station

== Places nearby ==
- Emporium Pluit Mall
- Pluit Junction

== Incident ==
On 31 March 2020 at 05:25, a container truck crashed into the western platform bays for northbound buses.
