= Transjakarta Corridor 12 =

Bus rapid transit route in Indonesia

- Pluit – Tanjung Priok
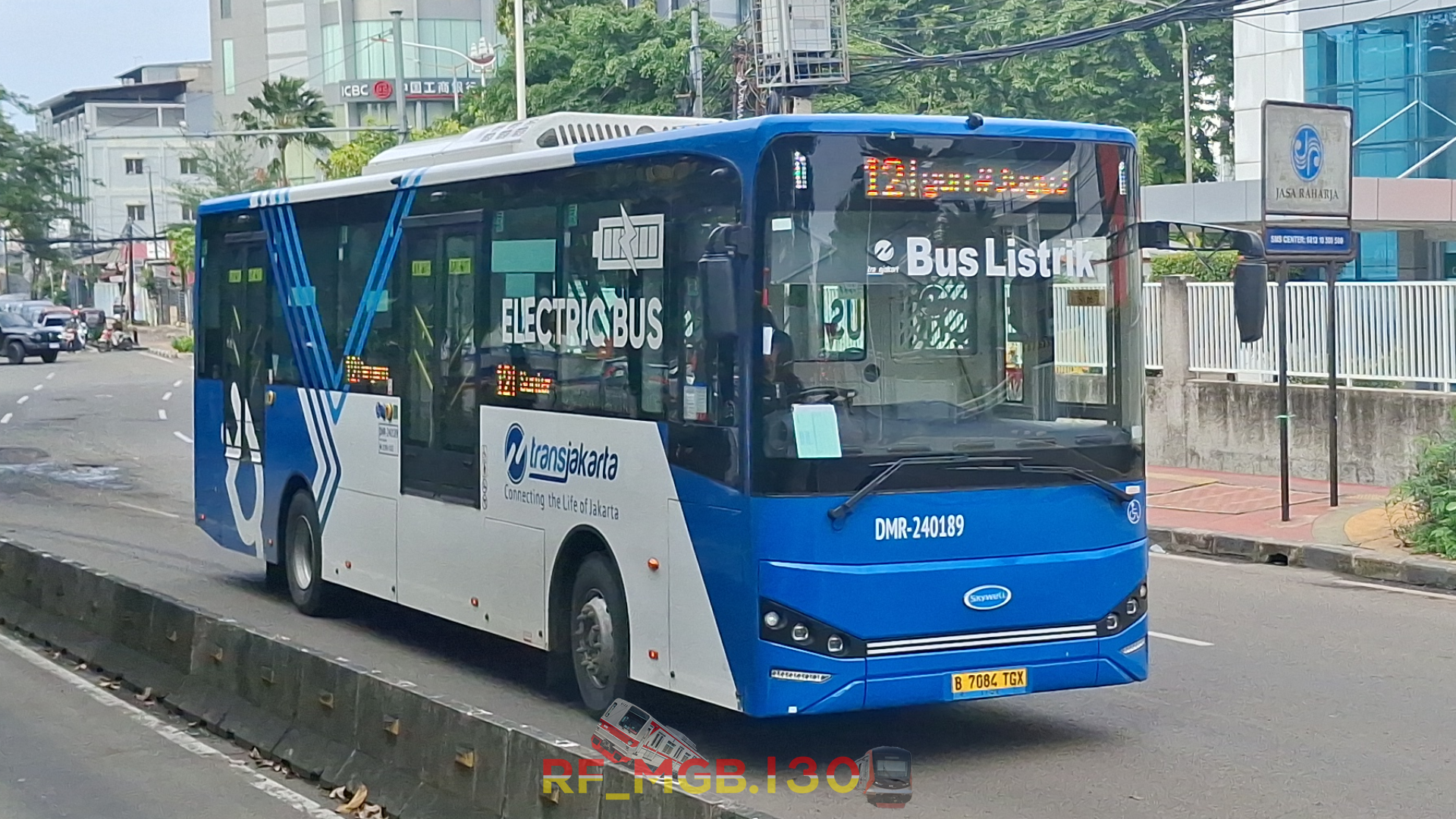
- The Skywell electric bus fleet of Corridor 12 passing through Penjaringan BRT station

Overview
- System: Transjakarta
- Operator: PT. Transportasi Jakarta (TJ, infrastructures, fleets, drivers, and staffs); Perum DAMRI (DMR, fleets and drivers)
- Began service: February 14, 2013

Route
- Route type: Street-level Bus Rapid Transit
- Locale: North Jakarta; Central Jakarta; West Jakarta
- Length: 18.85 km
- Stations: 24

Transjakarta Corridor 12 is a bus rapid transit corridor in Jakarta, Indonesia, operated by Transjakarta. It connects the Pluit BRT station to the Tanjung Priok Bus Terminal.This corridor is integrated with Jakarta Kota Station at the Kota BRT station, Kampung Bandan Station at Mangga Dua BRT station, and also the Tanjung Priuk railway station at the Tanjung Priok terminal.

The route is spiral-shaped: From Tanjung Priok, buses go through Enggano, Yos Sudarso, Danau Sunter Selatan Dalam, Mitra Sunter Boulevard, Danau Sunter Utara, Danau Sunter Barat, HBR Motik, Angkasa, Gunung Sahari, and Mangga Dua Streets and serve 15 stations in both directions. From Mangga Dua Raya station, westbound buses travel through Pantura, Pintu Besar Utara, Kali Besar Barat, Kopi, Bandengan Selatan, Jembatan Tiga Raya, Pluit Putra, Pluit Indah, Pluit Barat Raya, and Pluit Permai Streets, stopping at 3 stations unidirectionally before terminating at Pluit station. Eastbound buses travel through Pluit Timur Raya, Pluit Selatan Raya, Gedong Panjang, Kopi, Roa Malaka Utara, Tiang Bendera, Kali Besar Barat, Kunir, Lada Dalam, and Pintu Besar Utara, stopping at 5 stations unidirectionally before closing the loop at Mangga Dua Raya station and continuing eastwards towards Tanjung Priok. It is one of the two main BRT corridors that are spiral-shaped, the other being Corridor 2.

The corridor's route had experienced shortening twice: first in 2015 as "Penjaringan – Tanjung Priok," and again in 2019 as "Penjaringan – Sunter Kelapa Gading." The route was reverted to Pluit – Tanjung Priok as of 2021; however, most buses to this day only serve the "Penjaringan – Sunter Kelapa Gading" axis route.

Transjakarta launched a 35-minute express service between Pluit and Kota which is only available from 06:00 to 09:00 and was launched on May 8, 2023.

== History ==
Corridor 12 was inaugurated on February 14, 2013 by then Governor of Jakarta Joko Widodo at the Museum Fatahillah (now Museum Sejarah Jakarta) BRT station, with 36 new buses at the first day of the operational. Originally, this corridor used articulated buses, but because the route is very winding, especially in Kota Tua where the streets are narrow, it was quite difficult to navigate there, so the buses were changed to non-articulated buses.

In July 2015, this corridor was shortened, only limited from Penjaringan to Tanjung Priok, at that time the Pluit BRT station had not served Corridor 12. Then in August 2019, this corridor route was shortened again, so it only served the Penjaringan–Sunter Kelapa Gading route, since Pluit–Penjaringan segment was already served by Corridor 9 while Sunter Kelapa Gading–Tanjung Priok segment was already served by Corridor 10. As of December 18, 2021, Corridor 12 has returned to its original route, Pluit–Tanjung Priok. For now, the Penjaringan–Sunter Kelapa Gading route is only used as the axis route. However, most buses, to this day, still only serve this axis route with very few buses serving the full route.

On September 12, 2022, corridor 12 began to operate 24 hours a day, with its nighttime counterpart from 22:00-05:00 is branded as AMARI (Angkutan Malam Hari, lit. 'Night Transport'). However, unlike other main corridors (except Corridor 13), Corridor 12's AMARI service remains only serving Penjaringan–Sunter Kelapa Gading route with some buses terminating at Sunter Boulevard Barat (listed as Penjaringan–Sunter Boulevard Barat), leaving the two segments cut solely served by Corridors 9 and 10 respectively.

On May 8, 2023, the Pluit–Kota express service on Corridor 12 was launched along with two other express services on Corridor 6 and 9. The express route was made to shorten passenger's travel time during peak hours. The express service operates from 06:00 to 09:00 and it only took around 35 minutes from Pluit to Kota BRT station.

== List of BRT stations ==
- Currently, all stations are served by buses 24 hours a day, but Corridor 12 itself only serves from Penjaringan to Sunter Kelapa Gading for its nighttime AMARI service. Penjaringan to Pluit segment is served by Corridor 9, while Sunter Kelapa Gading to Tanjung Priok segment is served by Corridor 10 at night hours. Some AMARI services, notably those listed as "Penjaringan–Sunter Boulevard Barat" terminate and require all passengers to alight at Sunter Boulevard Barat with first departure boarding from Sunter Kelapa Gading.
- Stations indicated by a → sign has a one way service towards Tanjung Priok (daytime) or Sunter Kelapa Gading (nighttime) only. Stations indicated by a ← sign has a one way service towards Pluit (daytime) or Penjaringan (nighttime) only.

Corridor 12 (Pluit – Tanjung Priok)
Code	Station name	Transfer/Notes	Bus terminal and train station nearby
Stations in order: From top to bottom (downwards) towards Tanjung Priok or Sunter Kelapa Gading (→); from bottom to top (upwards) towards Pluit or Penjaringan (←)
12 01 9 26	Pluit	Two separate buildings for opposing directions require exiting paid area to transfer: Part 1: Arrivals only; Part 2: Towards Tanjung Priok (→); No Corridor 12 service during AMARI hours	
12 01 9 26	Pluit	Pluit	
12 02	Pluit Selatan →		
12 03	Pakin →		
12 04	Gedong Panjang →		
12 05 1 22	Museum Sejarah Jakarta →	Museum Sejarah Jakarta	
12 06 1 20	Kota →	Kota	Jakarta Kota Kota (U/C)
Towards Tanjung Priok or Sunter Kelapa Gading (→) heads straight to Mangga Dua Raya
Towards Pluit (←) heads straight to Pluit (daytime only)
AMARI service towards Sunter Kelapa Gading (→) from Penjaringan heads straight to Pluit Selatan
12 25 9 25	Penjaringan ←	Terminus for AMARI service	
12 25 9 25	Penjaringan ←	Penjaringan	
12 24	Bandengan ←		
12 23 1 21	Kali Besar ←	Kali Besar	
12 07	Mangga Dua Raya		
12 08	Mangga Dua		Mangga Dua (Planned)
12 09 5 03	Gunung Sahari	Gunung Sahari	
12 10 5 04	Jembatan Merah	Jembatan Merah	
12 11 14 05	Landasan Pacu	Landasan Pacu	
12 12 14 06	Danau Agung	Danau Agung	
12 13 14 07	Danau Sunter	Danau Sunter	
12 14	Sunter Utara		Sunter Barat (Planned)
12 15	Sunter Karya		Gelanggang Remaja (Planned)
12 16	Sunter Boulevard Barat	Towards Sunter Kelapa Gading (→) only during AMARI hours Some AMARI buses towards Sunter Kelapa Gading (→) terminate here and require all passengers to alight	
AMARI service towards Penjaringan (←) from Sunter Kelapa Gading heads straight to Sunter Karya
12 17 10 06	Sunter Kelapa Gading	Terminus during AMARI hours	Boulevard Gading (Planned)
12 17 10 06	Sunter Kelapa Gading	Sunter Kelapa Gading	Boulevard Gading (Planned)
12 18 10 05	Plumpang	No Corridor 12 service during AMARI hours	
12 18 10 05	Plumpang	Plumpang	
12 19 10 04	Walikota Jakarta Utara	Two separate buildings for opposing directions require exiting paid area to transfer: Northbound: Towards Tanjung Priok (→); Southbound: Towards Pluit (←); No Corridor 12 service during AMARI hours	
12 19 10 04	Walikota Jakarta Utara	Walikota Jakarta Utara	
12 20 10 03	Koja	No Corridor 12 service during AMARI hours	
12 20 10 03	Koja	Koja	
12 21 10 02	Mambo	No Corridor 12 service during AMARI hours	
12 21 10 02	Mambo	Mambo	
12 22 10 01	Tanjung Priok	Two separate buildings for opposing directions require exiting paid area to transfer: Part 1: Arrivals only; Part 2: Towards Pluit (←); No Corridor 12 service during AMARI hours	Tanjung Priuk Tanjung Priok Bus Terminal
12 22 10 01	Tanjung Priok	Tanjung Priok	Tanjung Priuk Tanjung Priok Bus Terminal

== Fleets ==
Information correct as of December 2024

- Transjakarta (self-managed) (TJ):
  - Hino RK1 JSNL CNG, white-blue
  - Mercedes-Benz OH 1526 NG, white-light blue (night bus, Penjaringan–Sunter Boulevard Barat (22:00-05:00))
- Perum DAMRI (DMR):
  - Skywell NJL6126BEV BRT e-bus, white-dark blue (DMR)

== Depots ==
- Transjakarta (TJ):
  - Kedaung Kali Angke
  - Cawang (night bus)
- Perum DAMRI (DMR):
  - Cakung

== See also ==
- Transjakarta
  - List of Transjakarta corridors
