= Jak Lingko =

Indonesian public transport payment card and integration program

- Logo
- Location: Jakarta, Indonesia
- Launched: 14 December 2017 (as Ok OTrip)
- Technology: FeliCa; QR code payment
- Operator: Consortium comprising Jatelindo, Thales Group, Lyko, and Aino (the latter owned by the Gadjah Mada University)
- Manager: PT Jakarta Lingko Indonesia
- Currency: IDR (Rp2,000,000 maximum load)
- Stored-value: Pay as you go
- Credit expiry: None
- Validity: All public transport in Indonesia, Toll road gate, Convenience store payment, and Park and ride (Note: except those issued by Bank Jakarta, which can only be used in Greater Jakarta)
- Website: jaklingkoindonesia.co.id

Jak Lingko or JakLingko (formerly OK OTrip) is a public transport integration program designed to integrate payment and physical connection between transport modes in Jakarta. The integration includes BRT, Commuter rail, Light Metro, MRT, LRT, Airport rail link and local angkot (Mikrotrans).

== History ==
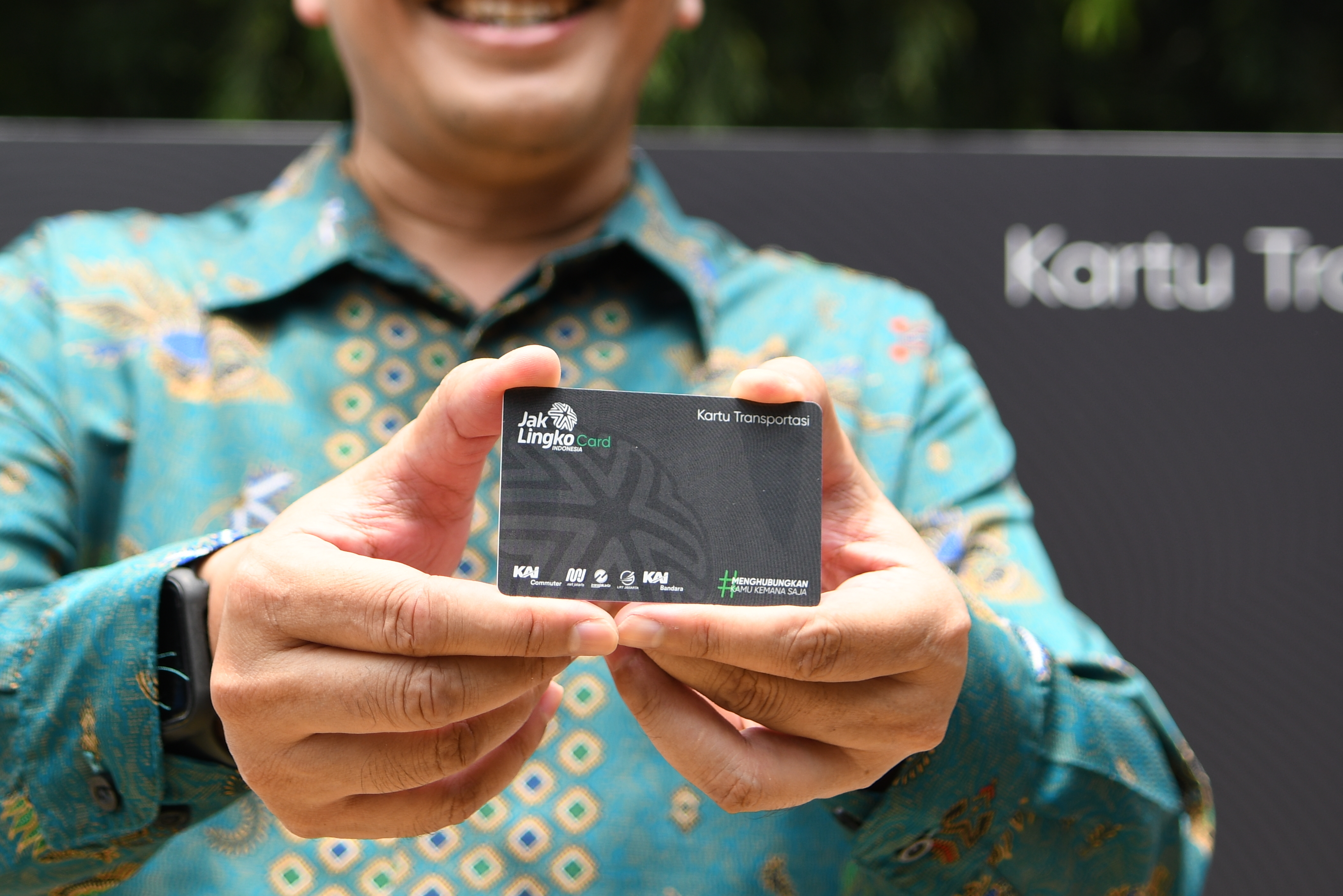
Jak Lingko payment card

One Karcis One Trip (OK OTrip, English: One Ticket One Trip) was initially launched in 2017. It was one of Governor Anies Baswedan's campaign promises. In September 2017, it was announced that Anies's program, as implemented by TransJakarta, would still be named OK OTrip, and that this would not pose a problem for the Audit Board of Indonesia. The card caps fares at IDR 5,000 for up to 3 hours on transfers for smaller participating local bus services to or from the TransJakarta BRT network, and aims to reduce transportation costs by 30 percent. In 2018, the program was rebranded as Jak Lingko, where "Jak" refers to Jakarta and "Lingko" deriving from the name of the interconnected irrigation network used in the Manggarai Regency on Flores Island, East Nusa Tenggara.

In September 2021, JakLingko officially announced its third generation payment card and a new mobility app, on limited trial since August 2021. JakLingko would implement Mobility-as-a-Service through the app by March 2022. It would later enable account based ticketing with fare classes by August 2022.

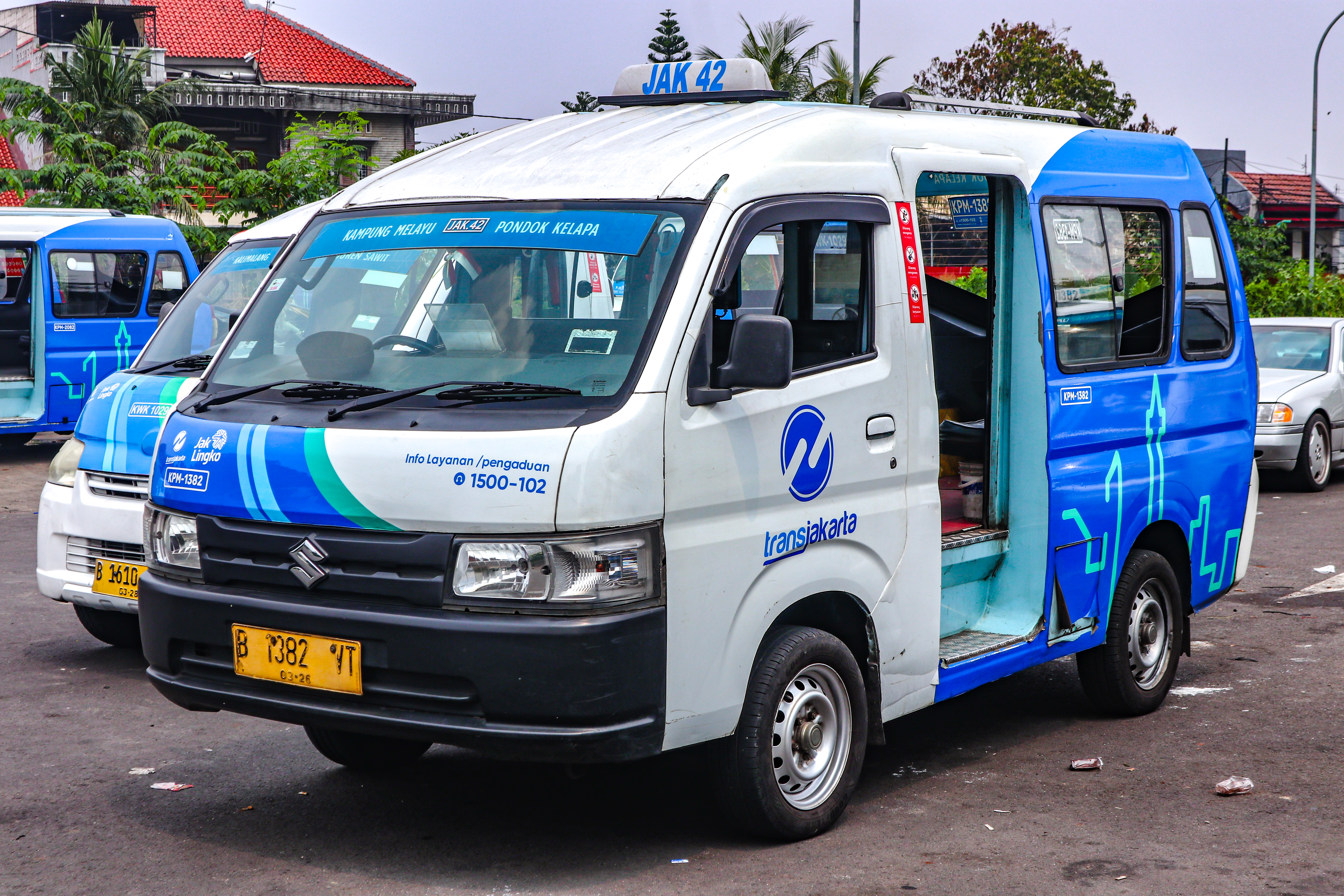
A MikroTrans Suzuki Carry minibus

Due to media miscommunication, MikroTrans minibuses and bus stops prominently branded as JakLingko, along with TransJakarta using the prefix "JAK" in angkot route numbers, have led to the term JakLingko being erroneously understood to refer exclusively to the service modernization scheme offered by TransJakarta to angkot operators in Jakarta. The proper brand used by TransJakarta is MikroTrans.

== See also ==
- Electronic money
- List of smart cards
- Greater Jakarta Integrated Mass Transit System
- Transport in Jakarta
  - KRL Commuterline
  - Jakarta MRT
  - Jabodebek LRT
  - Jakarta LRT
  - TransJakarta
