= Pluit =

Administrative village in Penjaringan, Jakarta

Coordinates: 6°07′S 106°47′E

Pluit is an administrative village (kelurahan) located in Penjaringan, Jakarta. In majority, of its residents are mainly inhabited by ethnic Chinese Indonesians. Pluit is a bustling area with residential and commercial establishments supported by modern amenities.

== Etymology ==
Contrary to popular belief, the name Pluit is not derived directly from fluit (whistle in Dutch). The name was derived from a Dutch type of ship, the fluyt. In the 17th century, a fluyt called het Witte Paard was shipwrecked on the eastern coast of the Angke River estuary. This ship was subsequently used as a stronghold in addition to the already existing Castle Vijfhoek to ward off sporadic attacks of Bantenese forces. This ship was then known as De Fluit, which later became Pluit.

== Waduk Pluit ==
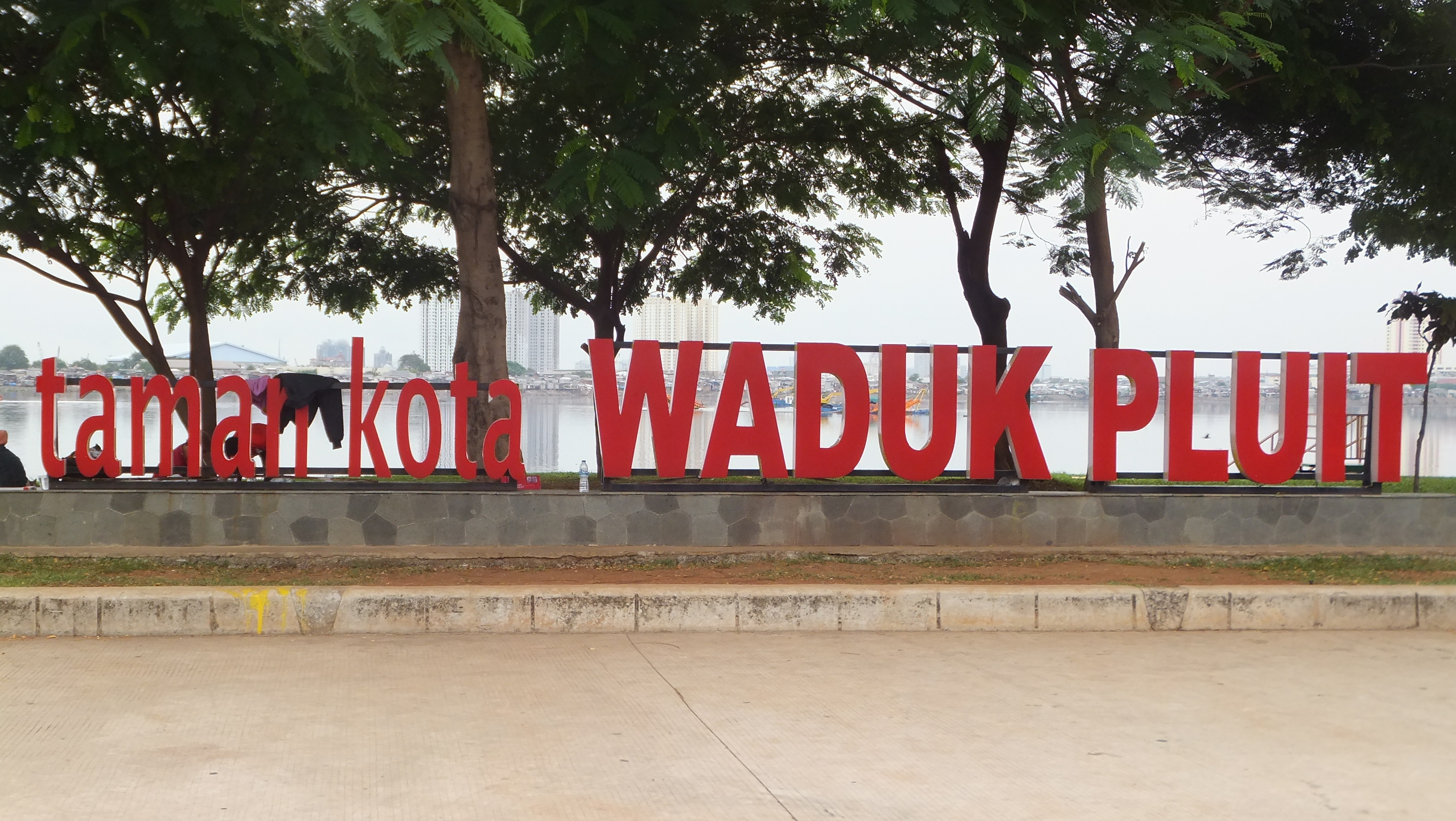
Waduk Pluit

Taman Kota Waduk Pluit (in English, Pluit Reservoir City Park) is a park adjacent to a water reservoir known as Waduk Pluit. The park provides fitness equipment, jogging tracks, and more.

== Pluit pumps ==
Pluit pumps are in use continuously during the rainy season, especially since Pluit is located below sea level.

Since its installation in 2002, the pumps have been useful in avoiding the seasonal flooding in the region that befalls Jakarta every four years. The Jakarta administration plans to build a new reservoir addition to the current reservoir with a value of Rp280 billion ($30.8 million), starting in 2012.

== Pantai Mutiara ==
Pantai Mutiara is a 100-hectare area housing complex, built on reclaimed land from Java Sea. It has private yacht jetties, multiple Sports Clubs, and entertainment hot spots. It's designed as an elite beach-style home with a private jetty for a private yacht. The area also has mixed multilevel complexes like Regatta and Apartment Pantai Mutiara.

== Malls in Pluit ==
Pluit has established itself as a bustling commercial center. There are several malls located in Pluit and around it. Some include

- Emporium Pluit Mall
- Pluit Junction
- Pluit Village (previously known as Megamall Pluit)
- Baywalk Mall

Emporium Pluit Mall and Pluit Junction are right across each other, while Pluit Village is approx. 1 km from Emporium Pluit Mall and Pluit Junction. Baywalk Mall at Green Bay Pluit is approx. another 2 km from Pluit Village. Emporium Pluit Mall and Pluit Junction are right on the road that leads to Soekarno-Hatta International Airport, Jakarta. Emporium Pluit Mall has 1 hotel (Holiday Inn Express Pluit) while Pluit Junction also has a hotel, FaveHotel Pluit.

== Cited works ==
- Merrillees, Scott (2015). Jakarta: Portraits of a Capital 1950-1980. Jakarta: Equinox Publishing. ISBN 9786028397308.
