= Boulevard Selatan LRT station =

Light rapid transit station in North Jakarta, Indonesia

S03 Boulevard Selatan Station Stasiun Boulevard Selatan
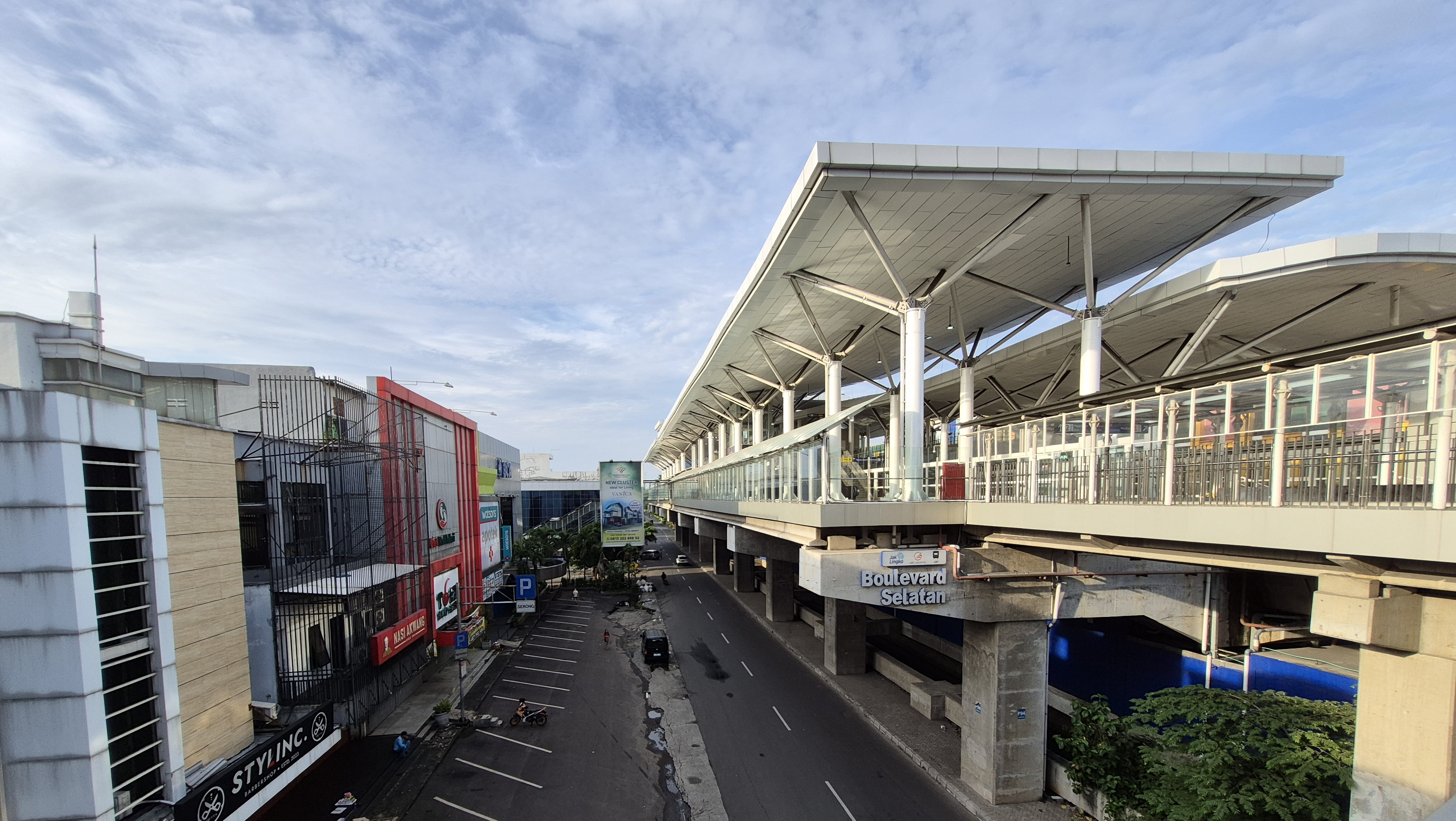
- Boulevard Selatan Station

General information
- Location: Jl. Boulevard Raya, East Kelapa Gading, Kelapa Gading, North Jakarta; Jakarta; Indonesia
- Coordinates: 6.168989988163692°S 106.89999550580978°E
- System: Jakarta LRT station
- Owner: Regional Government of Special Capital Region of Jakarta
- Operator: Jakarta Propertindo
- Line: Southern Line
- Platforms: 2 side platforms
- Tracks: 2

Construction
- Structure type: Elevated
- Parking: Unavailable
- Cycle facilities: Available
- Accessible: Available

Other information
- Station code: S-03 • BVS

History
- Opened: 11 June 2019 trial 1 December 2019 full

Services
Preceding station	Jakarta LRT	Following station
Boulevard Utara Summarecon Mall towards Kelapa Gading	Southern Line	Pulomas towards Manggarai
Location
- Location within Jakarta

Boulevard Selatan Station is a light rapid transit station of the Jakarta LRT Southern Line in Jakarta, Indonesia. It is located at East Kelapa Gading, Kelapa Gading, North Jakarta, Indonesia.

The station is one of the six stations of the first phase of LRT Southern Line which opened on 1 December 2019.

== Station layout ==
3rd floor	Mezzanine	Interplatform overhead crossing, musalla
2nd floor	Corridor	Fare gates, ticket counter and vending machines, retails
2nd floor	Side platform, the doors are opened on the right side
2nd floor	Line 1	← (Pulomas)	Southern Line to Manggarai
2nd floor	Line 2		Southern Line to Kelapa Gading	(Boulevard Utara Summarecon Mall) →
2nd floor	Side platform, the doors are opened on the right side
1st floor	Street	Entrances/exits

== Services ==
- Southern Line, to Kelapa Gading and Manggarai

== Gallery ==
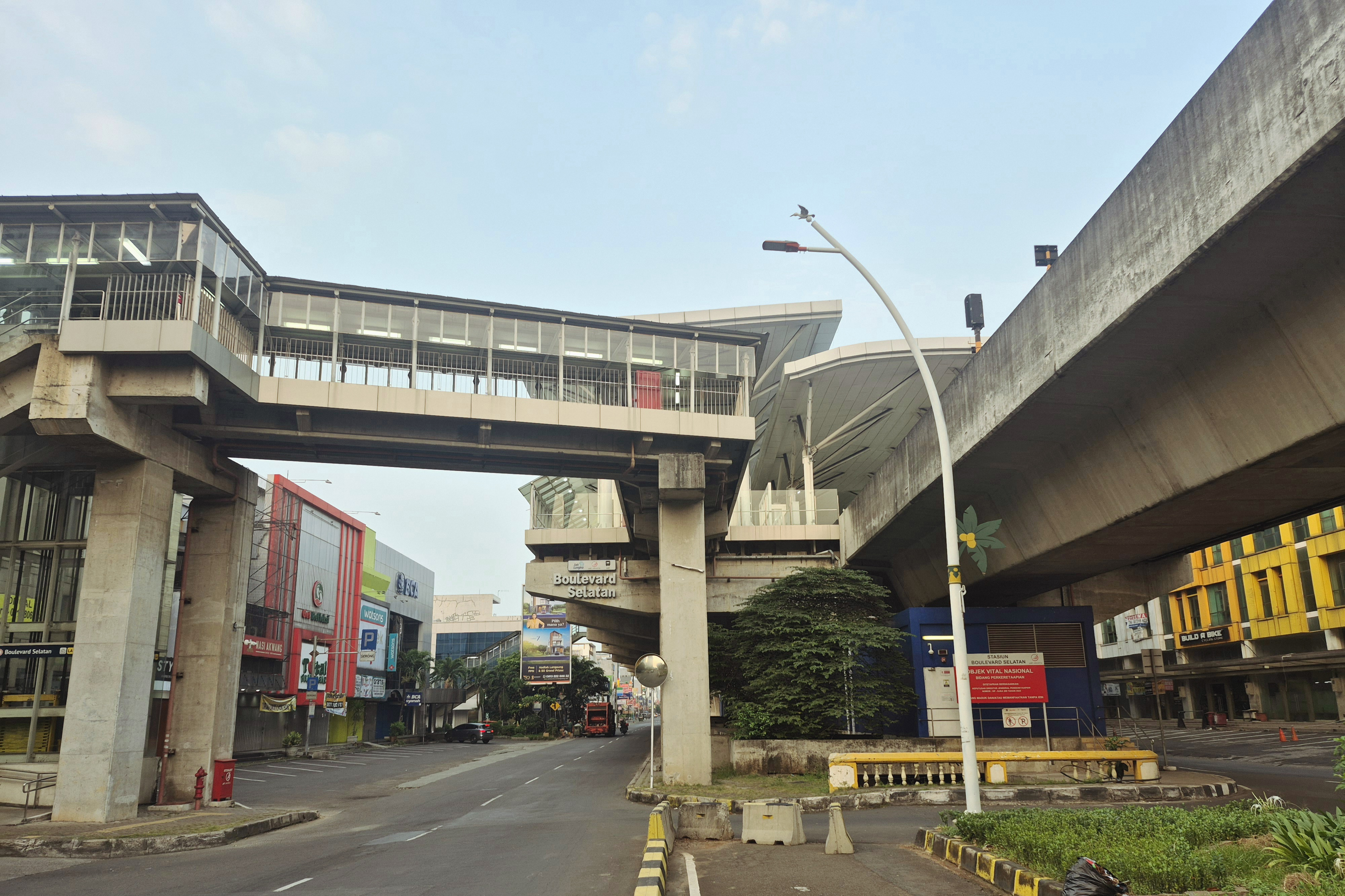
Exterior of the station

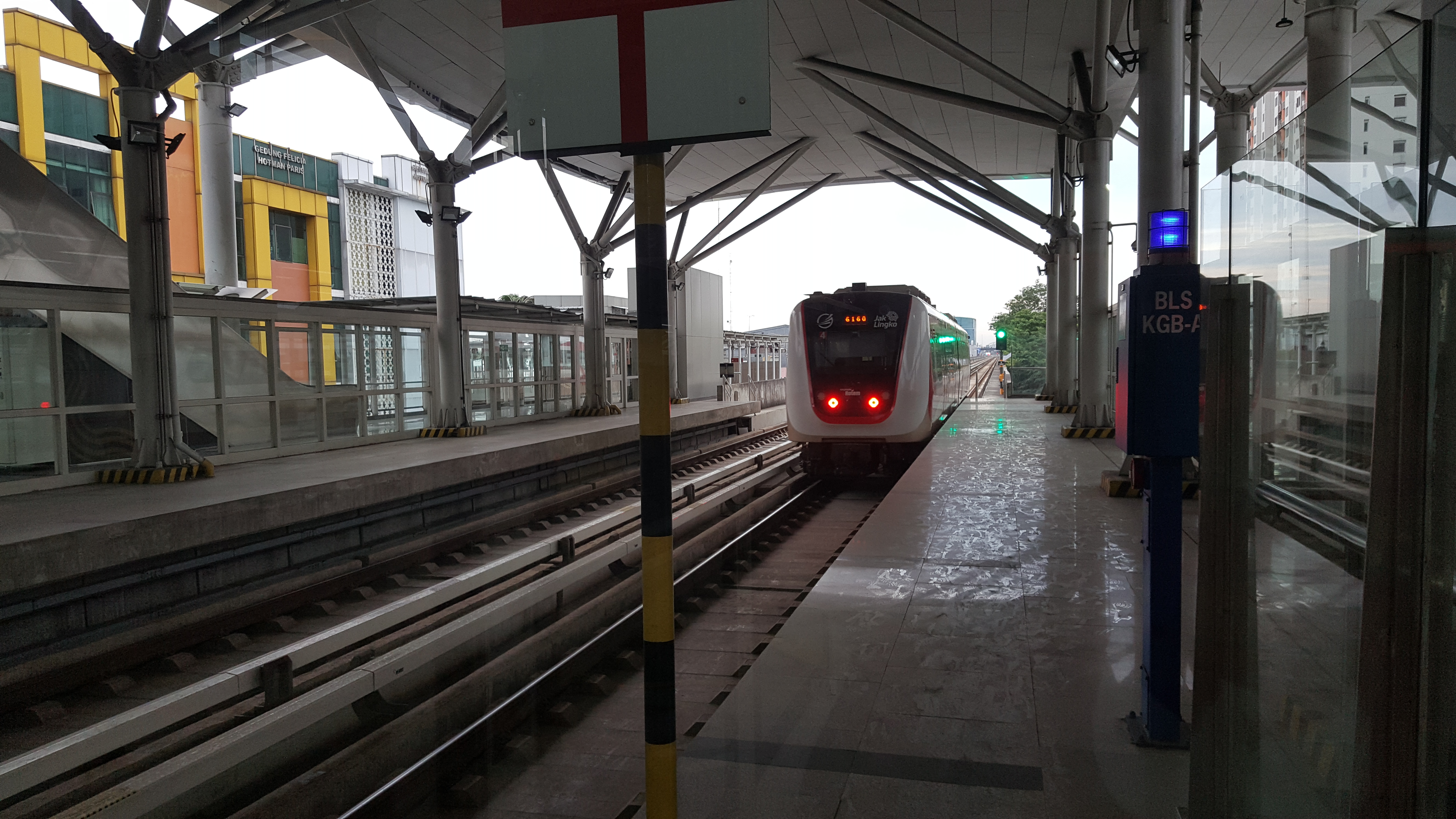
Train departing from Boulevard Selatan LRT station to Pegangsaan Dua

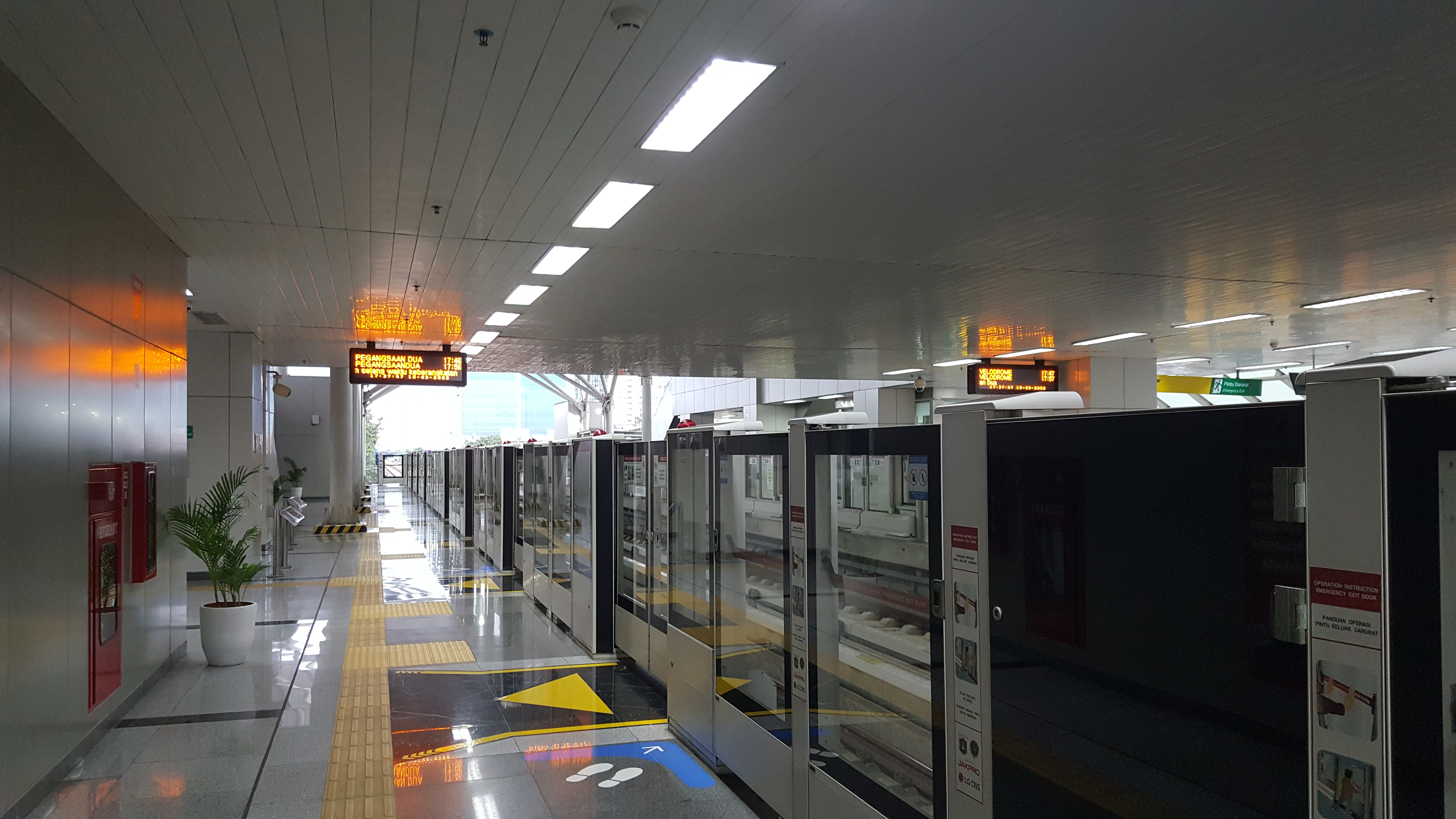
Boulevard Selatan station platform
