= Velodrome LRT station =

Light rapid transit station in Jakarta, Indonesia

S06 Velodrome Station Stasiun Velodrome
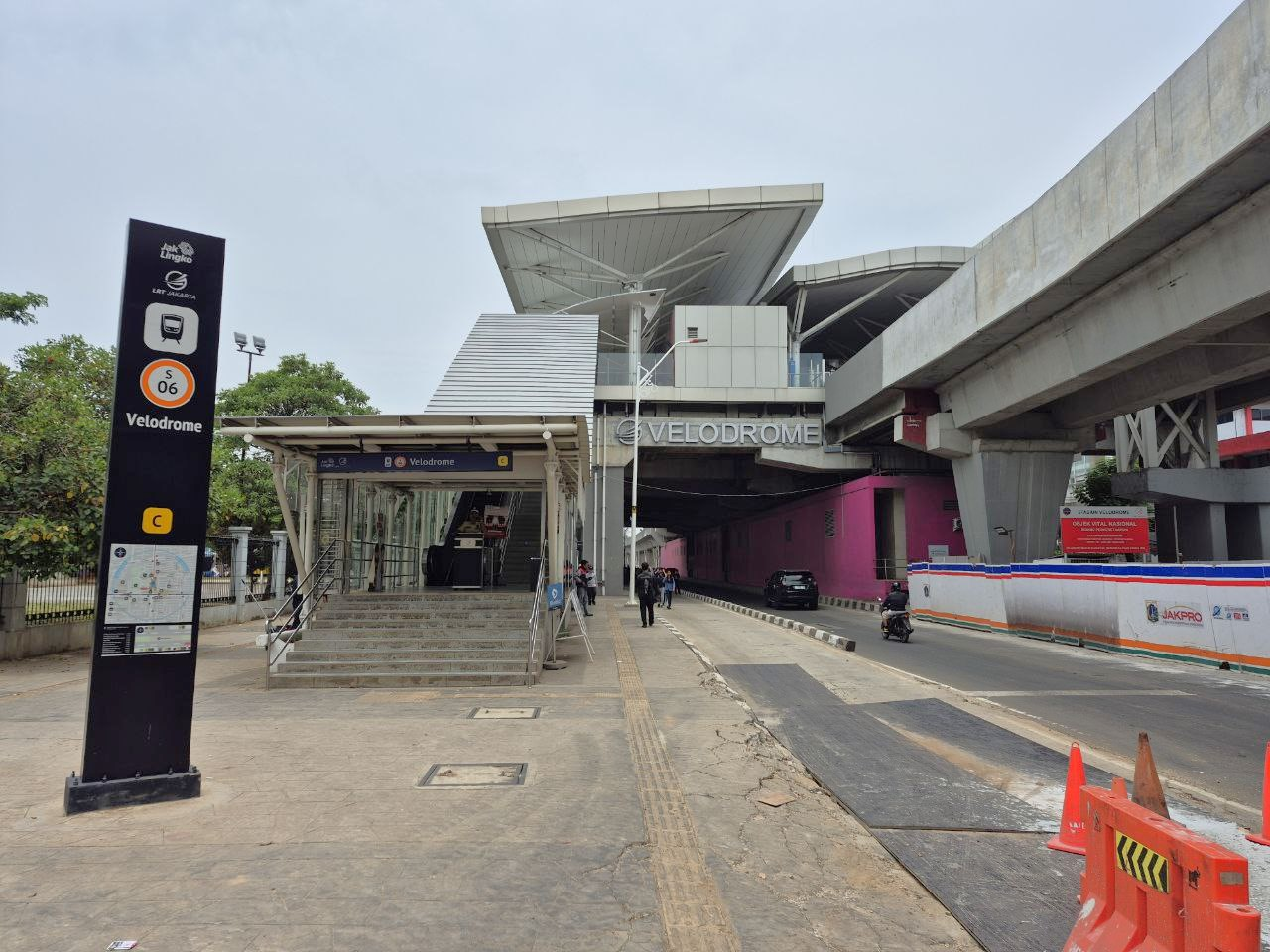
- Exterior seen from south, 2024

General information
- Location: Jl. Kayu Putih Raya, Rawamangun, Pulo Gadung, East Jakarta; Jakarta; Indonesia
- Coordinates: 6.192581°S 106.89121°E
- System: Jakarta LRT station
- Owner: Regional Government of Special Capital Region of Jakarta
- Operator: Jakarta Propertindo
- Line: Southern Line
- Platforms: 2 side platforms
- Tracks: 2
- Connections: Pemuda Rawamangun

Construction
- Structure type: Elevated
- Parking: Unavailable
- Accessible: .Available

Other information
- Station code: S-06 • VEL

History
- Opened: 11 June 2019 trial 1 December 2019 full

Services
| Preceding station | Jakarta LRT | Following station |
|---|---|---|
| Equestrian towards Kelapa Gading | Southern Line | Rawamangun towards Manggarai |
Route map
Location
- Location within Jakarta

Velodrome Station is a light rapid transit station of the Jakarta LRT Southern Line, located at Rawamangun, Pulo Gadung, East Jakarta, Indonesia. It is one of the six stations of the first phase of the LRT Southern Line which opened on 1 December 2019.

Velodrome Station is located near Rawamangun sports complex, which include the Jakarta International Velodrome (hence the name).

== History ==
During the construction, a skybridge was built between Velodrome Station to the nearby Pemuda Rawamangun Transjakarta bus rapid transit (BRT) station to the southeast. The skybridge was opened 26 July 2019, during the LRT's public trial between 11 June – 30 November. Velodrome Station along with the entire Southern Line phase 1 from Velodrome to Pegangsaan Dua (now Kelapa Gading) began commercial operationals since 1 December 2019. It was the terminus of the service line until an extension to Manggarai was opened in 2026.

== Station layout ==
| 3rd floor | Mezzanine | Interplatform overhead crossing, musalla |
| 2nd floor | Corridor | Fare gates, ticket counter and vending machines, retails |
| 2nd floor | Side platform, the doors are opened on the right side |
| 2nd floor | Line 1 | ← (Rawamangun) | Southern Line to Manggarai |
| 2nd floor | Line 2 | | Southern Line to Kelapa Gading | (Equestrian) → |
| 2nd floor | Side platform, the doors are opened on the right side |
| 1st floor | Street | Entrances/exits |

== Services ==
- Southern Line, to Kelapa Gading and Manggarai

== Gallery ==
An elevator to access the station

Entrance from the connection skybridge to the Pemuda Rawamangun Transjakarta BRT station

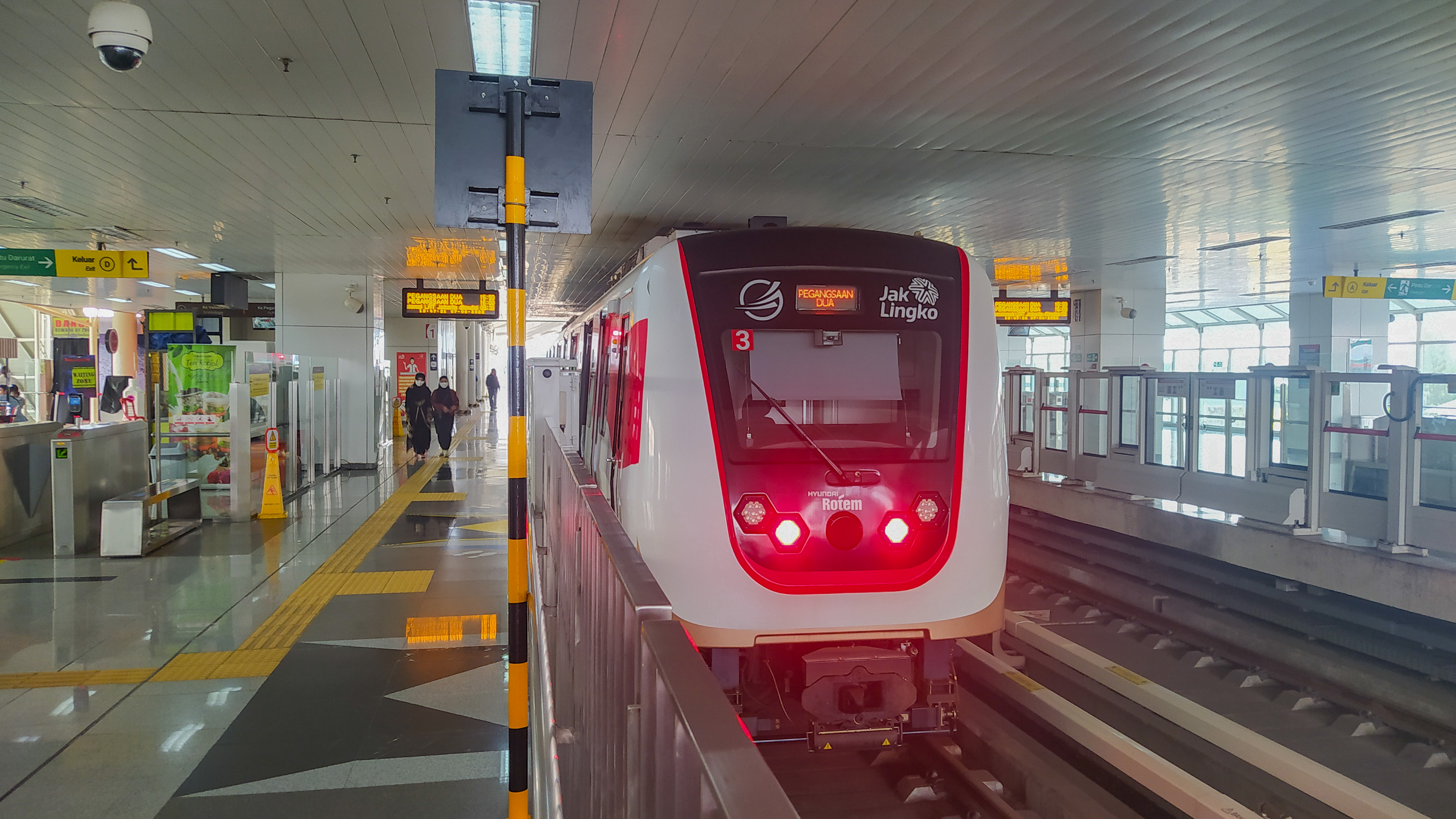
The EMU at Velodrome station

The platform area and double-track. Note the buffer stop has been removed since the trials for the extended line to Manggarai
