= Rawamangun LRT station =

Light rapid transit station in Jakarta, Indonesia

S07 Rawamangun Station Stasiun Rawamangun
- Exterior of Rawamangun LRT Station, 2026

General information
- Location: Jl. Pemuda, Rawamangun, Pulo Gadung, East Jakarta; Jakarta; Indonesia
- Coordinates: 6.19323°S 106.88367°E
- System: Jakarta LRT station
- Owner: Regional Government of Special Capital Region of Jakarta
- Operator: Jakarta Propertindo
- Line: Southern Line
- Platforms: 2 side platforms
- Tracks: 2
- Connections: Kayu Jati

Construction
- Structure type: Elevated
- Parking: Unavailable
- Accessible: .Available

Other information
- Station code: S-07 • RWM

History
- Opened: 30 September 2024 trial 16 September 2026 full

Services
| Preceding station | Jakarta LRT | Following station |
|---|---|---|
| Velodrome towards Kelapa Gading | Southern Line | Pramuka towards Manggarai |
Route map
Location
- Location within Jakarta

Rawamangun Station is a light rapid transit station of the Jakarta LRT Southern Line, located at Rawamangun, Pulo Gadung, East Jakarta, Indonesia. It first began operations through a trial run on the Velodrome–Rawamangun segment on 30 September 2024, before officially opening on 16 September 2026. The station is located between Velodrome and Pramuka.

== Nearby places ==
- State University of Jakarta

== Station layout ==
| 3rd floor | Side platform, the doors are opened on the right side |
| 3rd floor | Line 1 | ← (Pramuka) | Southern Line to Manggarai |
| 3rd floor | Line 2 | | Southern Line to Kelapa Gading | (Velodrome) → |
| 3rd floor | Side platform, the doors are opened on the right side |
| 2nd floor | Corridor | Fare gates, ticket counter and vending machines |
| 1st floor | Street | Entrances/exits |

Both platforms at this LRT station are equipped with platform screen doors. These doors only open when a train is boarding or alighting passengers to prevent waiting passengers from falling onto the tracks.

== Gallery ==
Entrance gate of Rawamangun LRT Station under construction, 2026

Elevator facility behind Kayu Jati Transjakarta BRT station, 2026

Rawamangun LRT Station from the southeast side

Rawamangun LRT Station seen from McDonald's Pemuda
