= Equestrian LRT station =

Light rapid transit station in Jakarta, Indonesia

S05 Equestrian Station Stasiun Equestrian
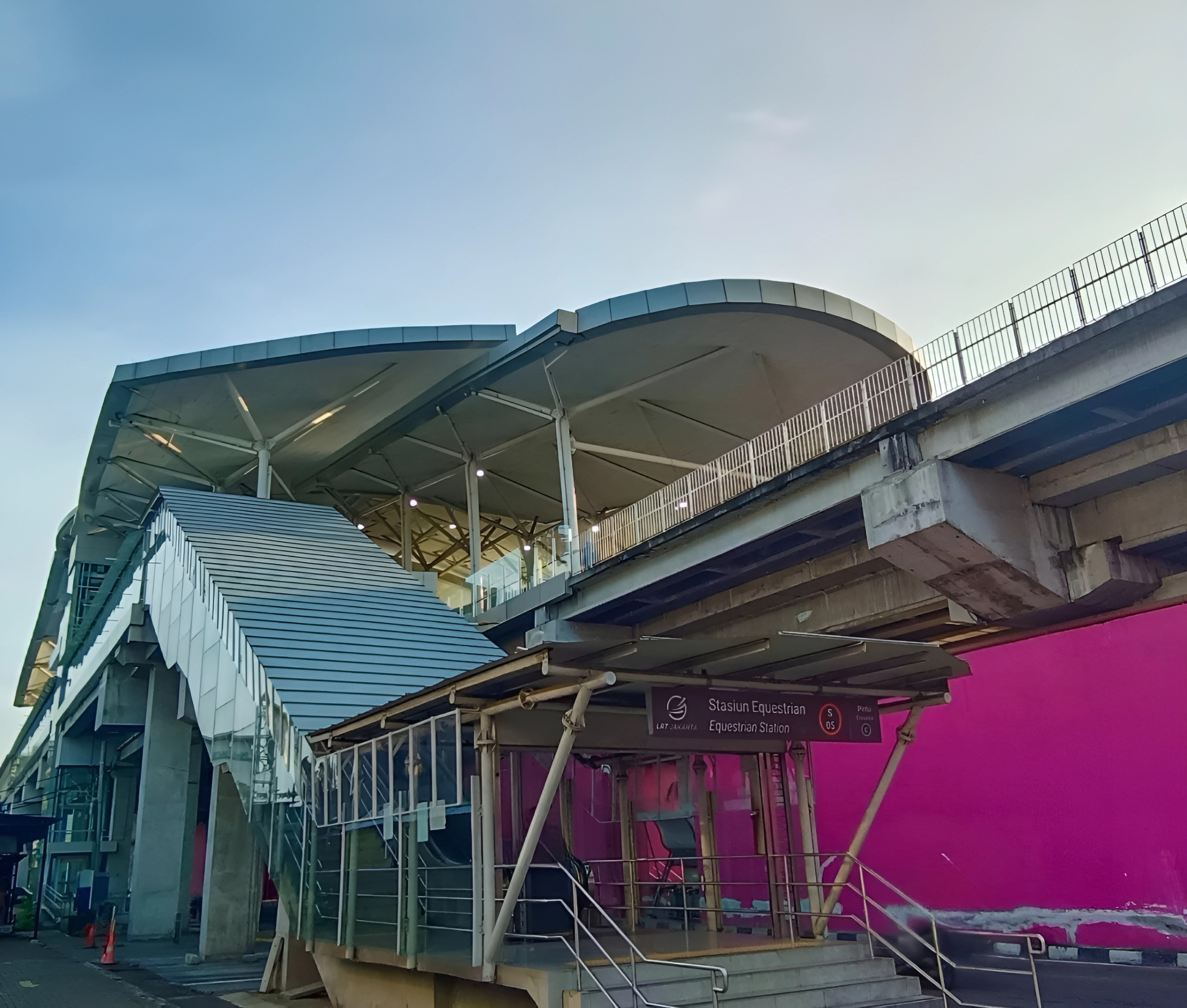
- Equestrian Station

General information
- Location: Jl. Kayu Putih Raya, Kayu Putih, Pulo Gadung, East Jakarta; Jakarta; Indonesia
- Coordinates: 6.184059165906717°S 106.89126893877982°E
- System: Jakarta LRT station
- Owner: Regional Government of Special Capital Region of Jakarta
- Operator: Jakarta Propertindo
- Line: Southern Line
- Platforms: 2 side platforms
- Tracks: 2

Construction
- Structure type: Elevated
- Parking: Unavailable
- Cycle facilities: Available
- Accessible: Available

Other information
- Station code: S-05

History
- Opened: 11 June 2019 trial 1 December 2019 full

Services
Preceding station	Jakarta LRT	Following station
Pulomas towards Kelapa Gading	Southern Line	Velodrome towards Manggarai
Route map
Location
- Location within Jakarta

Equestrian Station is a light rapid transit station of the Jakarta LRT Southern Line, located at Kayu Putih, Pulo Gadung, East Jakarta, Indonesia. It is one of the six stations of the first phase of the LRT Southern Line which opened on 1 December 2019.

The station is located near Jakarta International Equestrian Park, hence the name.

== Station layout ==
3rd floor	Mezzanine	Interplatform overhead crossing, musalla
2nd floor	Corridor	Fare gates, ticket counter and vending machines, retails
2nd floor	Side platform, the doors are opened on the right side
2nd floor	Line 1	← (Velodrome)	Southern Line to Manggarai
2nd floor	Line 2		Southern Line to Kelapa Gading	(Pulomas) →
2nd floor	Side platform, the doors are opened on the right side
1st floor	Street	Entrances/exits

== Services ==
- Southern Line, to Kelapa Gading and Manggarai

== Gallery ==
Fare gates

The double-track and platforms seen from the mezzanine

The LRT EMU at the platform area
