= Pulomas LRT station =

Light rapid transit station in East Jakarta, Indonesia

S04 Pulomas Station Stasiun Pulomas
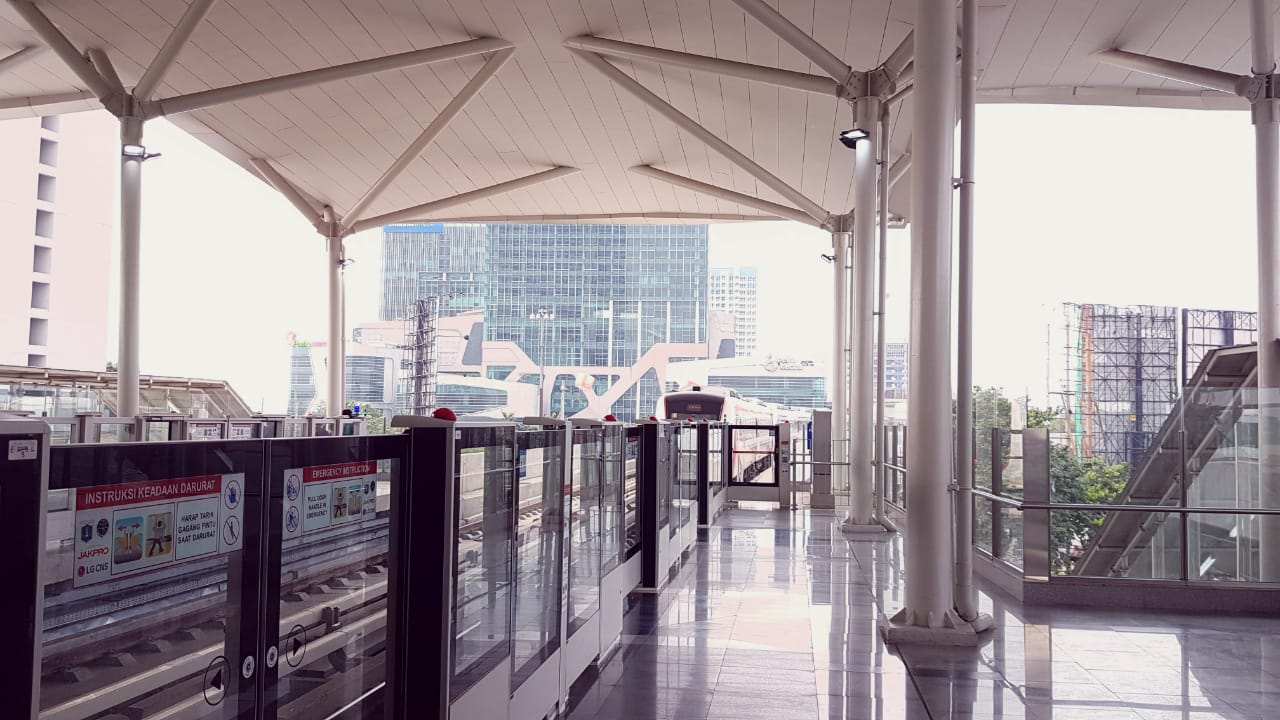
- Pulomas station platforms, June 2019

General information
- Location: Jl. Kayu Putih Raya, Kayu Putih, Pulo Gadung, East Jakarta; Jakarta; Indonesia
- Coordinates: 6.1841°S 106.8913°E
- System: Jakarta LRT station
- Owner: Regional Government of Special Capital Region of Jakarta
- Operator: Jakarta Propertindo
- Line: Southern Line
- Platforms: 2 side platforms
- Tracks: 2
- Connections: Pulo Mas

Construction
- Structure type: Elevated
- Parking: Unavailable
- Accessible: Available

Other information
- Station code: S-04, PUM

History
- Opened: 11 June 2019 trial 1 December 2019 full

Services
Preceding station	Jakarta LRT	Following station
Boulevard Selatan towards Kelapa Gading	Southern Line	Equestrian towards Manggarai
Route map
Location
- Location within Jakarta

Pulomas Station is a light rapid transit station of the Jakarta LRT Southern Line, located at Kayu Putih, Pulo Gadung, East Jakarta, Indonesia. It is one of the six stations of the first phase of LRT Southern Line which opened on 1 December 2019.

== Station layout ==
3rd floor	Mezzanine	Interplatform overhead crossing, musalla
2nd floor	Corridor	Fare gates, ticket counter and vending machines, retails
2nd floor	Side platform, the doors are opened on the right side
2nd floor	Line 1	← (Equestrian)	Southern Line to Manggarai
2nd floor	Line 2		Southern Line to Kelapa Gading	(Boulevard Selatan) →
2nd floor	Side platform, the doors are opened on the right side
1st floor	Street	Entrances/exits

== Services ==
- Southern Line, to Kelapa Gading and Manggarai

== Gallery ==
One of the entrances

Ticket vending machine

Outer concourse area

Platform area, 2025
