= Pulo Mas (Transjakarta) =

Bus rapid transit station in Jakarta, Indonesia

2 03 Pulo Mas
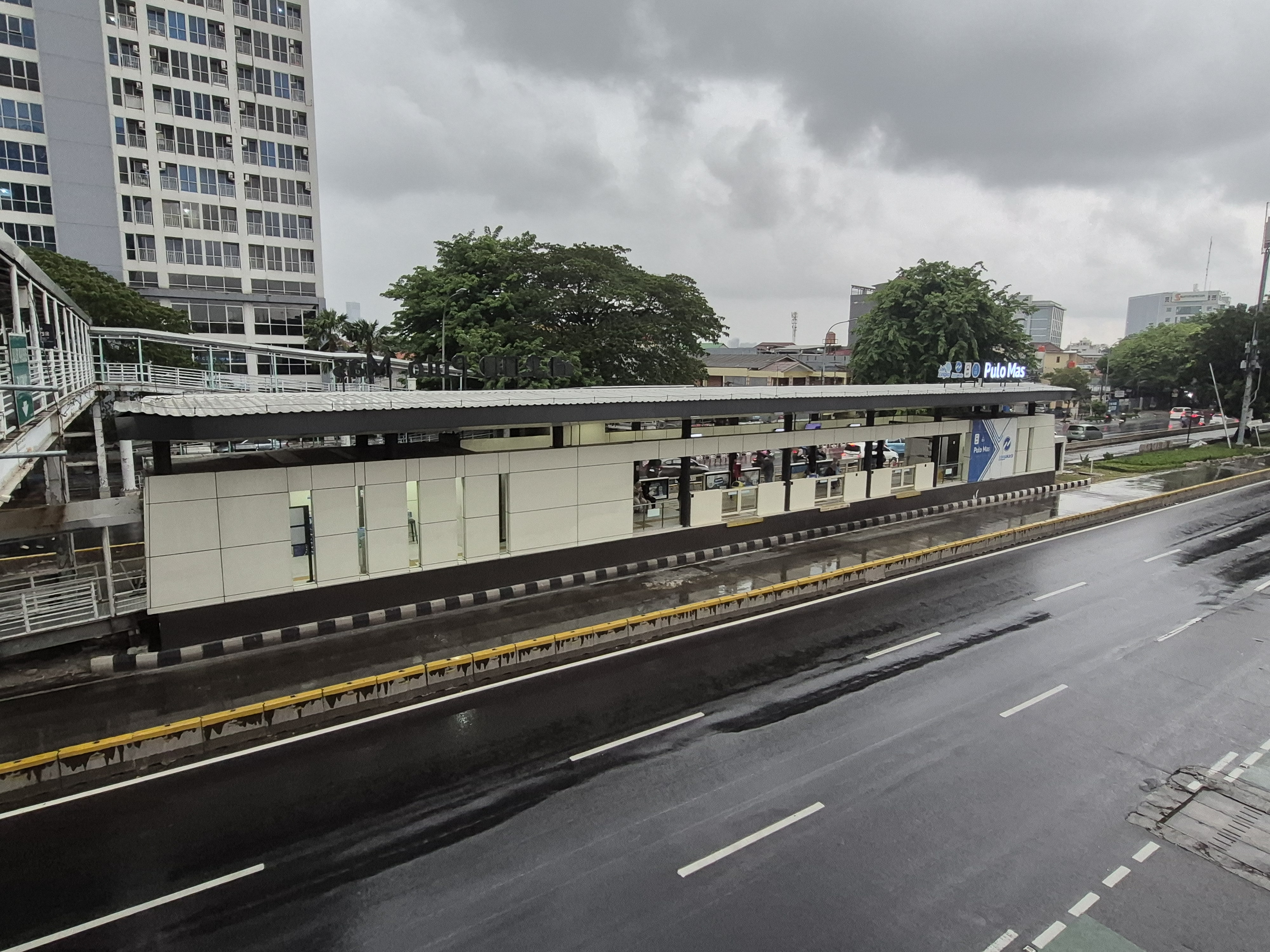
- Exterior of the station viewed from access bridge

General information
- Location: Perintis Kemerdekaan Avenue Kelapa Gading Barat, Kelapa Gading, North Jakarta (northern side); Kayu Putih, Pulo Gadung, East Jakarta (southern side) Indonesia
- System: Transjakarta bus rapid transit station
- Owner: Transjakarta
- Operator: Transjakarta
- Lines: List of Transjakarta corridors#Corridor 2 List of Transjakarta corridors#Cross-corridor routes
- Platforms: Single island platform
- Connections: Pulomas

Construction
- Structure type: At-grade

Other information
- Status: In service

History
- Opened: 15 January 2006
- Rebuilt: 7 October 2023; 2 years ago

Services
Preceding		Following
Bermis towards Pulo Gadung	Corridor 2	Perintis Kemerdekaan towards Monumen Nasional
Bermis towards Pulo Gadung	Corridor 2 Route 2A	Perintis Kemerdekaan towards Rawa Buaya
Location

Pulo Mas (formerly spelled as Pulomas) is a Transjakarta bus rapid transit station located on Perintis Kemerdekaan Avenue, Kelapa Gading Barat, Kelapa Gading, North Jakarta, Indonesia, serving Corridor 2. It is located within walking distance to Pulomas LRT station on the Southern Line. It is named after the streets located around the station.

== History ==
The station opened on 15 January 2006 together with the rest of Corridor 2. On 3 June 2023, the station was closed for revitalisation works alongside Pasar Rumput, Pancoran, and the two Grogol stations. Passengers were advised to use the adjacent Perintis Kemerdekaan and Bermis stations. The station reopened on 7 October 2023.

== Building and layout ==
After revitalisation works, the new station has a modern design similar to that of Jembatan Gantung station. However, the new station is smaller than the old one, featuring just three bus bays on each side as opposed to six that the old station featured. Although they are located within walking distance from each other, the BRT station and Pulomas LRT station are not directly connected, and transferring is done by walking on the sidewalk.

Northeast	towards Pulo Gadung (Bermis) →
Island platform, doors open on the right
Southwest	← (Perintis Kemerdekaan) towards Monumen Nasional and towards Rawa Buaya

== Non-BRT bus services ==
Type	Route	Destination	Notes
Jakarta Fair feeder		Pulo Gadung—JIEXPO Kemayoran	Only operates during the Jakarta Fair and/or other events at the Jakarta International Expo. Inside the station
Mikrotrans Jak Lingko	JAK 59	Rawamangun—Pegangsaan Dua	Outside the station
Mikrotrans Jak Lingko	JAK 87	Tanjung Priok—Rawamangun	Outside the station

== Gallery ==
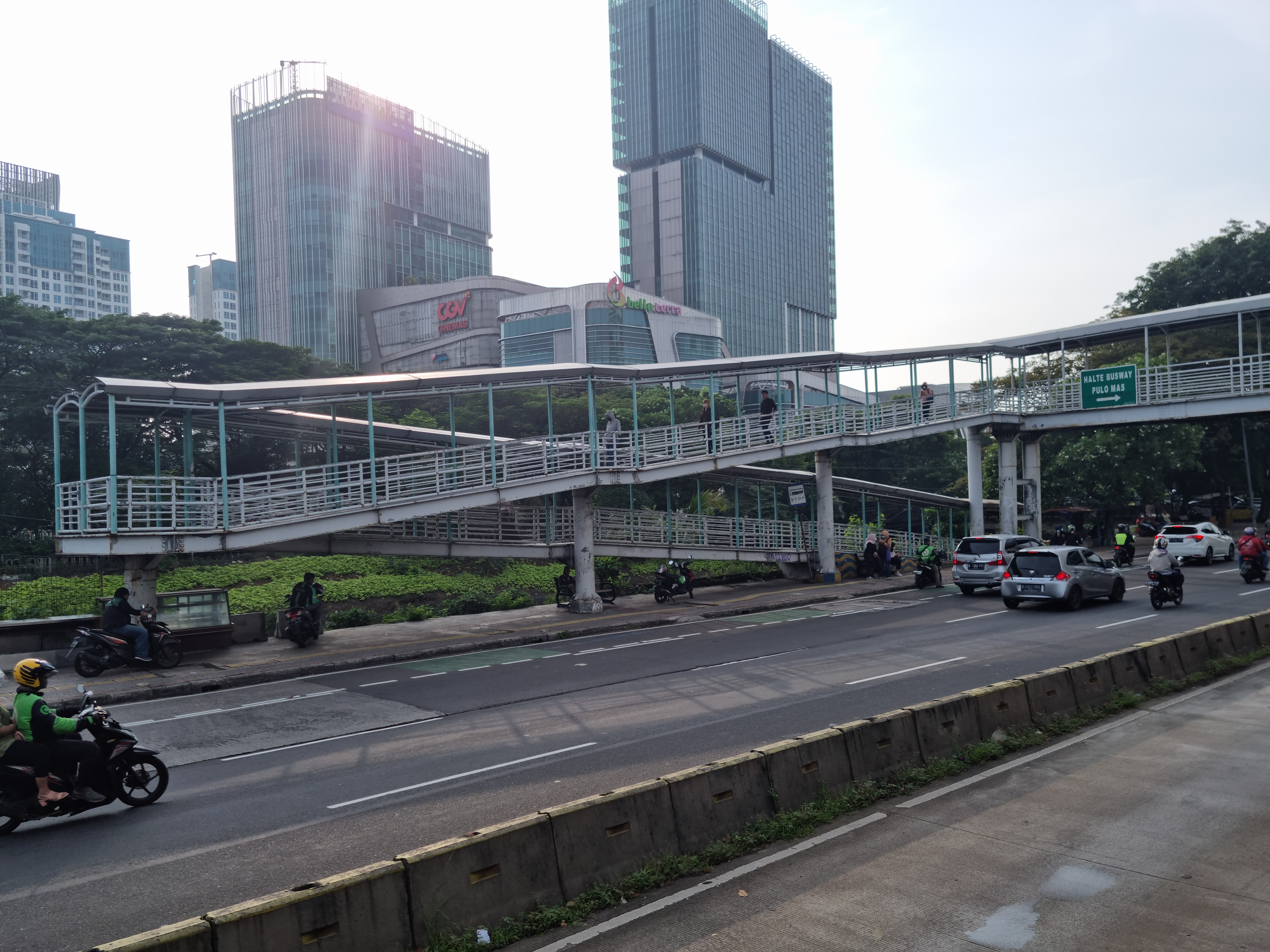
Skybridge to access the station

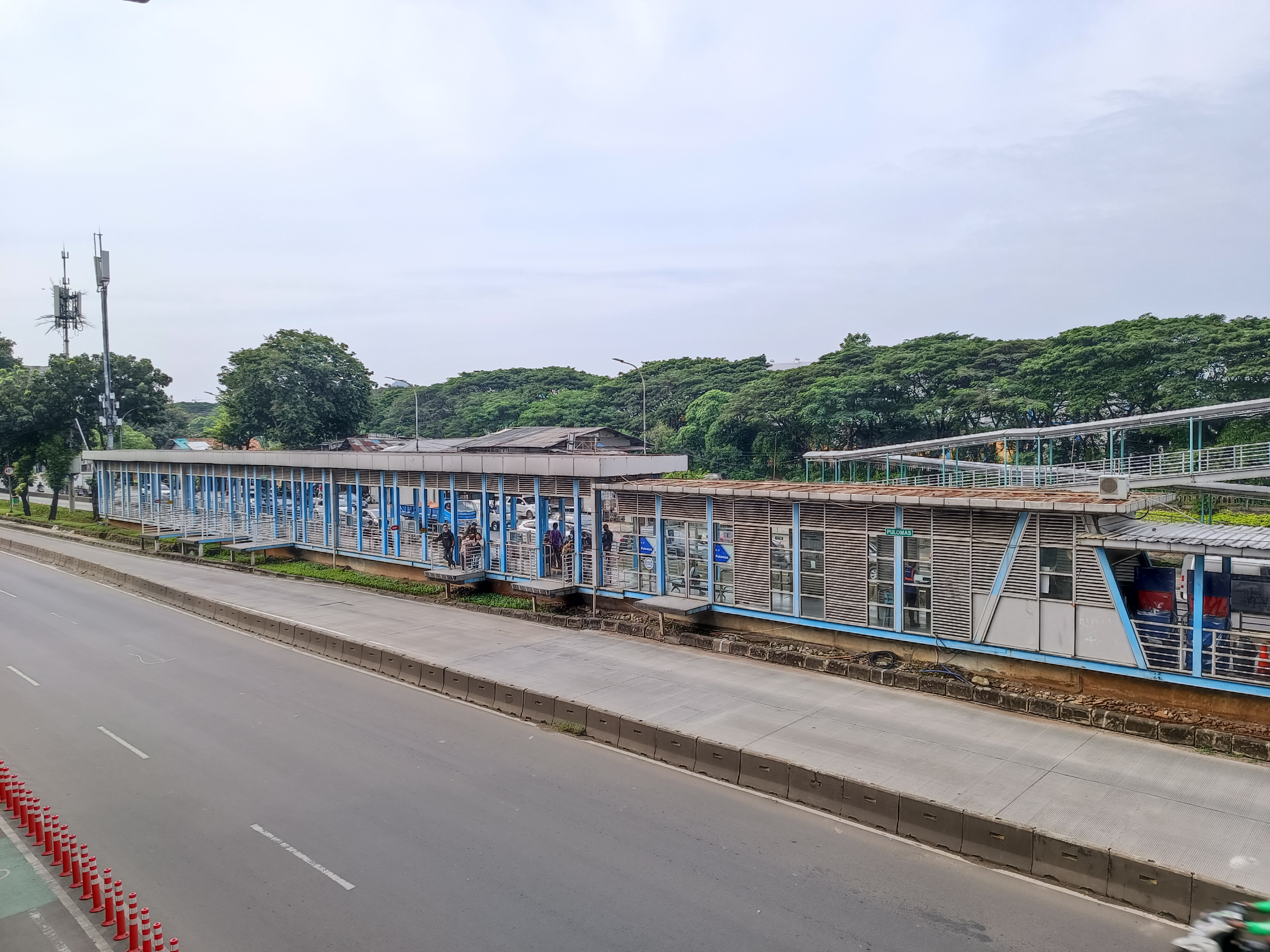
The station prior to revitalisation works

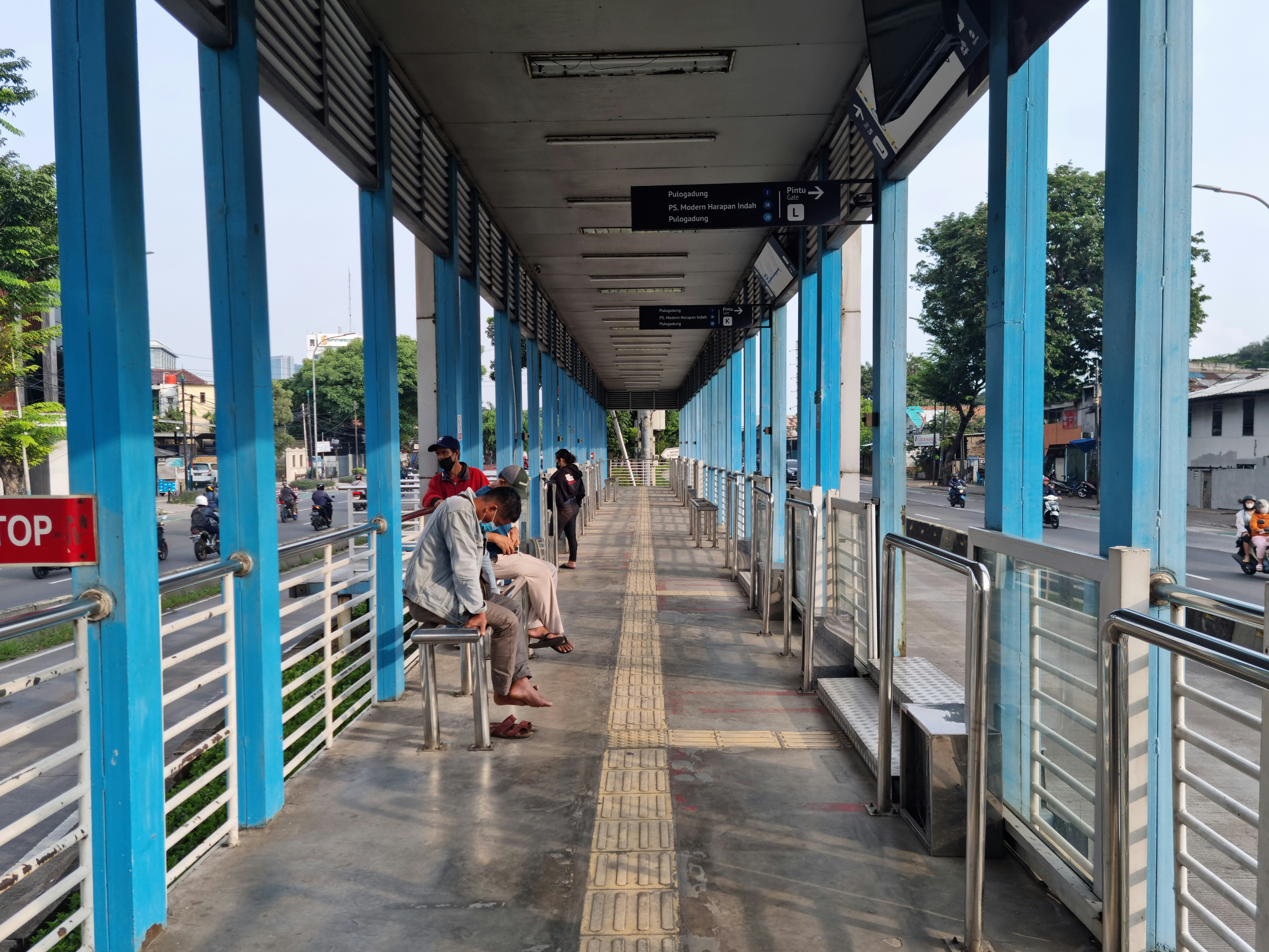
The old station's platform extension

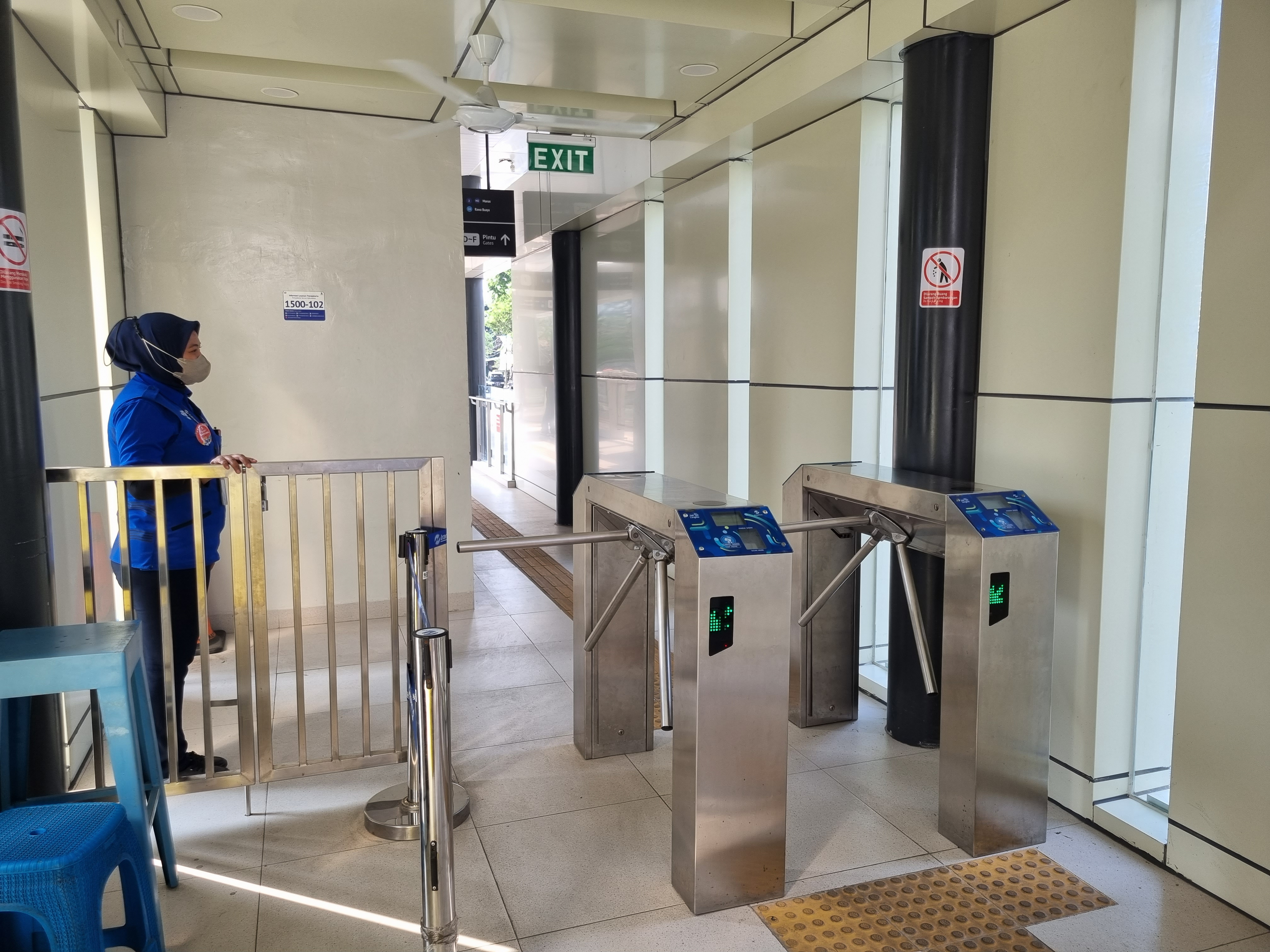
Faregates at the entrance

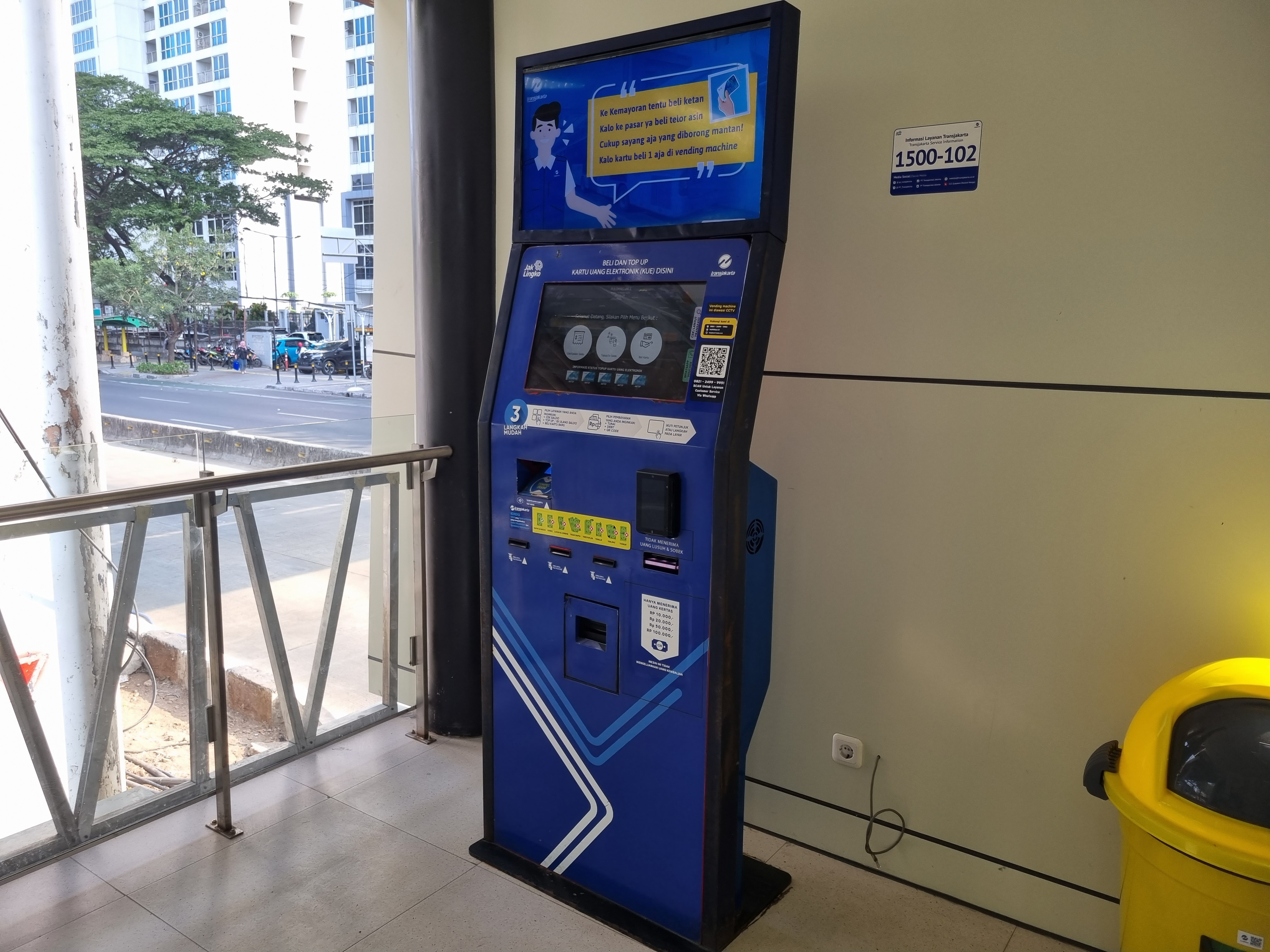
A ticket vending machine at the entrance area

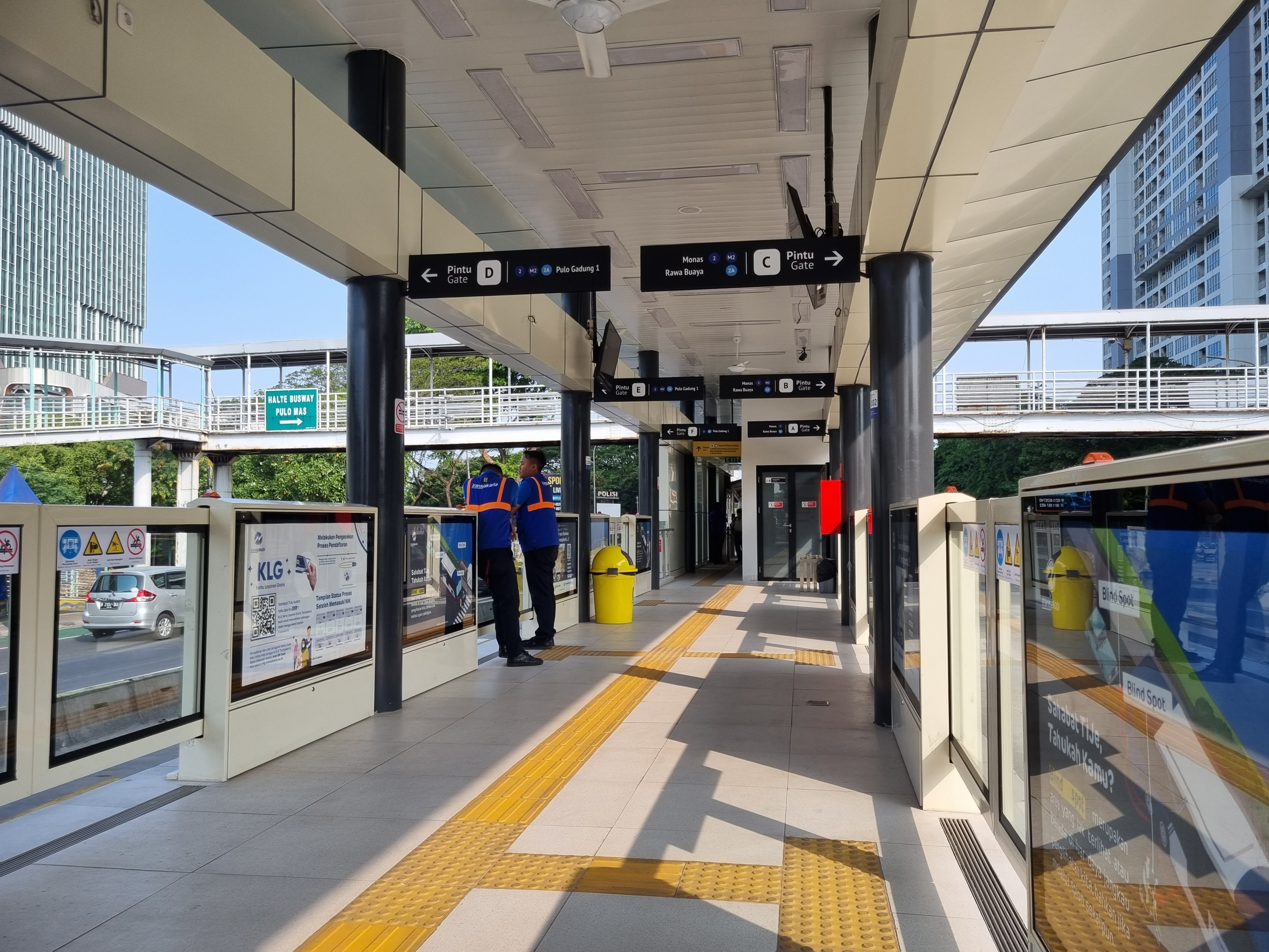
Interior of the revitalized station

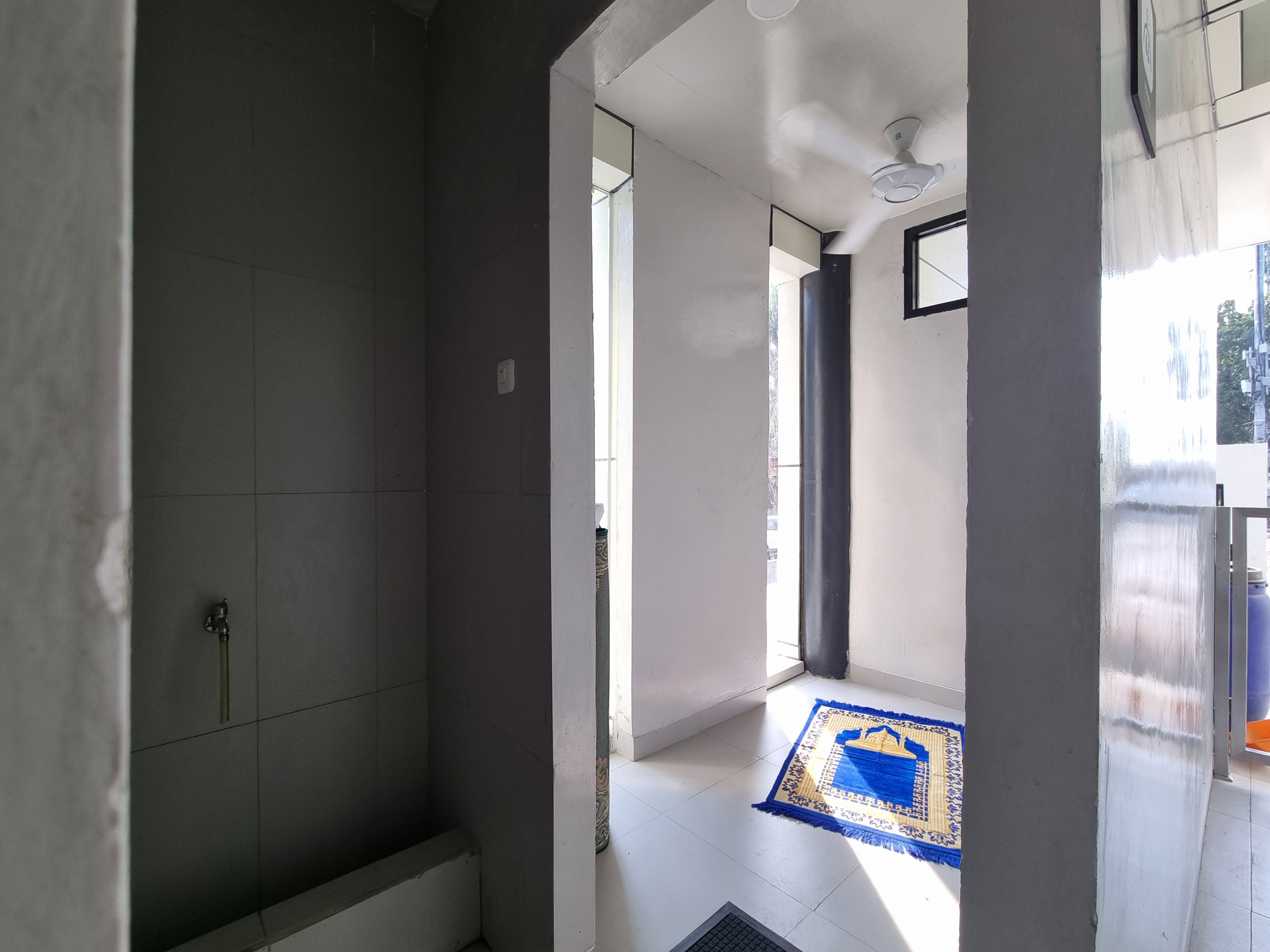
Prayer room

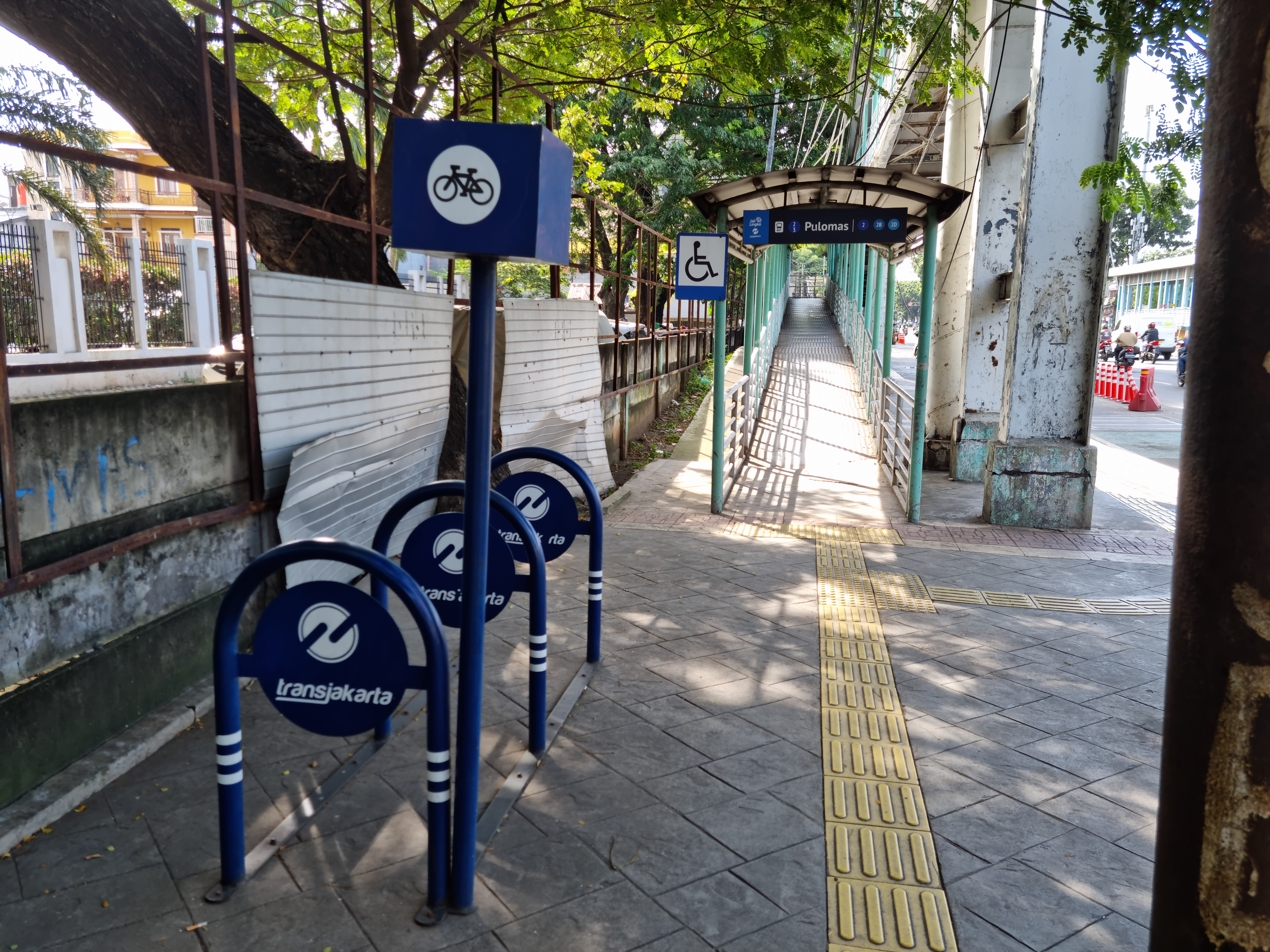
Bicycle parking racks at the sidewalk
