= Boulevard Utara Summarecon Mall LRT station =

LRT station in Indonesia

S02 Boulevard Utara Summarecon Mall Station Stasiun Boulevard Utara Summarecon Mall
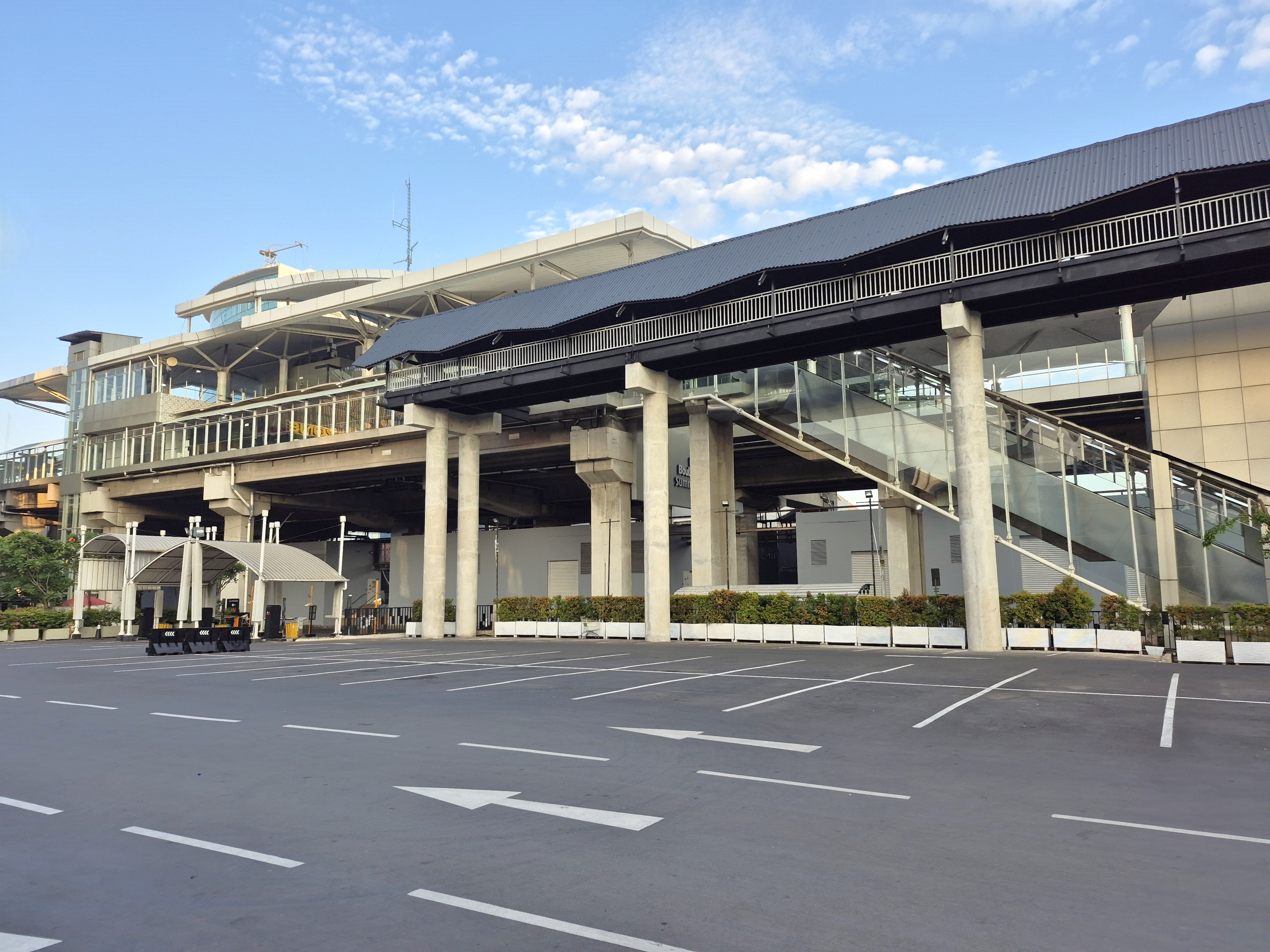
- Station building seen from Mall Kelapa Gading 1 after a connection bridge to the mall was built, 2025

General information
- Other names: Boulevard Utara Station
- Location: Jl. Boulevard Raya, East Kelapa Gading, Kelapa Gading, North Jakarta; Jakarta; Indonesia
- Coordinates: 6.159413531020288°S 106.90600533038378°E
- System: Jakarta LRT Station
- Owner: Regional Government of Special Capital Region of Jakarta
- Operator: Jakarta Propertindo
- Line: Southern Line
- Platforms: 2 side platforms
- Tracks: 2

Construction
- Structure type: Elevated
- Parking: Unavailable
- Cycle facilities: Available
- Accessible: Available

Other information
- Station code: S-02 • BVU

History
- Opened: 11 June 2019 trial 1 December 2019 full

Services
Preceding station	Jakarta LRT	Following station
Kelapa Gading Terminus	Southern Line	Boulevard Selatan towards Manggarai
Route map
Location
- Location within Jakarta

Boulevard Utara Station (or Boulevard Utara Summarecon Mall Station, with Summarecon Agung granted for naming rights) is a light rapid transit station of the Jakarta LRT Southern Line in Jakarta, Indonesia. The station is located at East Kelapa Gading, Kelapa Gading, North Jakarta.

The station is one of the six stations of the first phase of Jakarta LRT Southern Line which opened on 1 December 2019. The station is also connected with Mal Kelapa Gading (MKG) where MKG also provides park and ride facilities for LRT passengers.

== Station layout ==
3rd floor	Mezzanine	Interplatform overhead crossing, musalla
2nd floor	Corridor	Fare gates, ticket counter and vending machines, retails and access bridge to Mal Kelapa Gading
2nd floor	Side platform, the doors are opened on the right side
2nd floor	Line 1	← (Boulevard Selatan)	Southern Line to Manggarai
2nd floor	Line 2		Southern Line to Kelapa Gading	(Kelapa Gading) →
2nd floor	Side platform, the doors are opened on the right side
1st floor	Street	Entrances/exits

== Services ==
- Southern Line, to Kelapa Gading and Manggarai

== Places nearby ==
- Summarecon Mall Kelapa Gading
  - La Piazza Kelapa Gading
- Gading Walk
- Menara Satu Sentra Kelapa Gading
- Gafoy
- Al-Musyawarah Mosque
- Jogging Park Kelapa Gading

== Gallery ==
One of the entrances at the southern end of the station.

The platform area

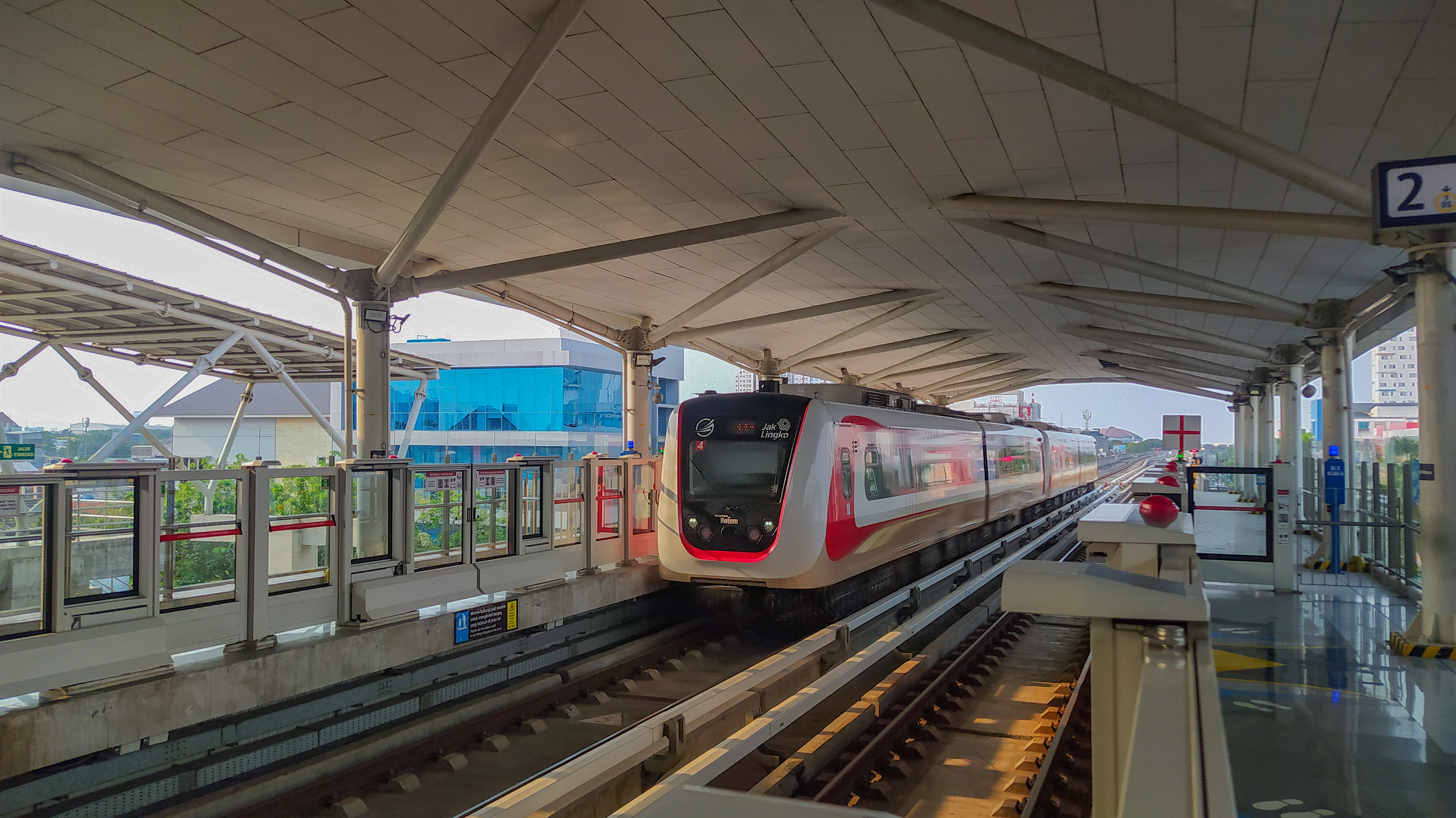
The Hyundai Rotem LRT train arriving at the station platform

The double track seen from the mezzanine
