= Mal Kelapa Gading =

Summarecon Mall Kelapa Gading

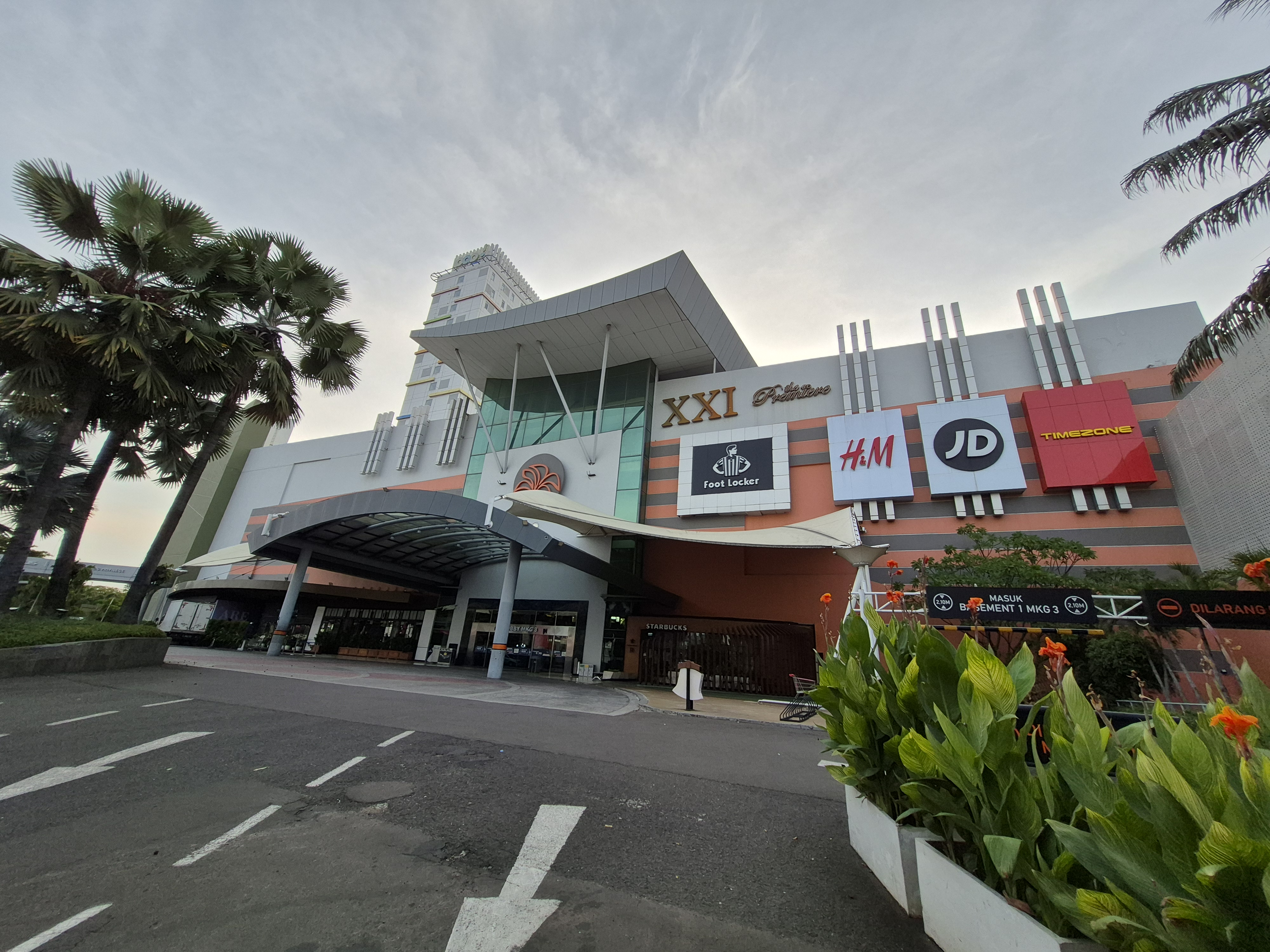
- Facade of Summarecon Mall Kelapa Gading 3
- Location: Kelapa Gading, Jakarta, Indonesia
- Coordinates: 6.157284°S 106.908447°E
- Opened: 1990 (Plaza Kelapa Gading (MKG 1)); 1995 (MKG 2); 2003 (MKG 3); 2010 (MKG 5)
- Owner: PT Summarecon Agung Tbk
- Num. of stores: 600+
- Num. of anchor tenants: 4
- Floor area: 150,000 m^{2} (1,600,000 sq ft)
- Parking: Available
- Public transit: Boulevard Utara Summarecon Mall
- Website: malkelapagading.com

Summarecon Mall Kelapa Gading (formerly Kelapa Gading Plaza and Mal Kelapa Gading) is a shopping and entertainment center located in Kelapa Gading, Jakarta, Indonesia. It is one of the largest shopping malls in Indonesia.

== History ==
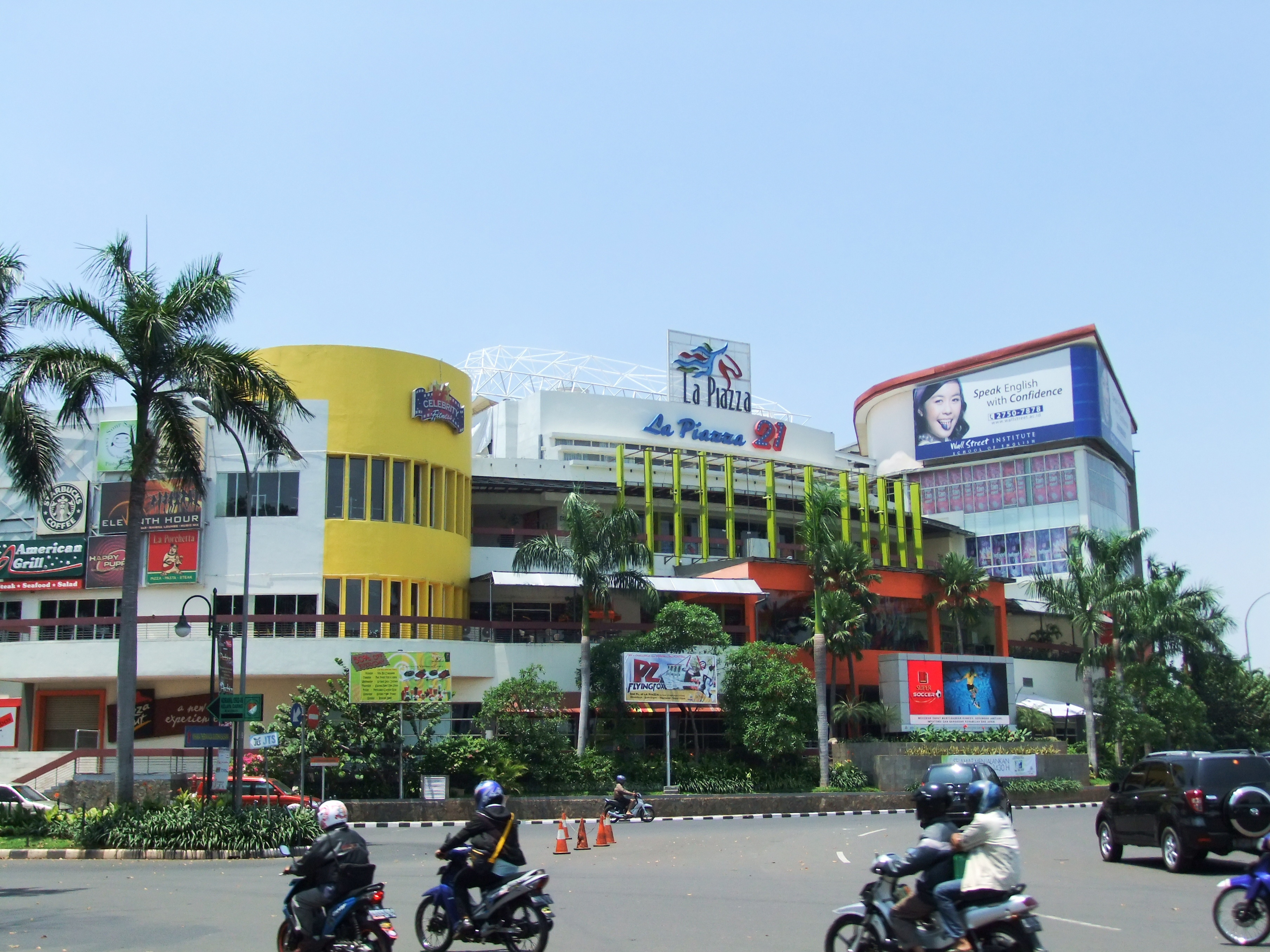
La Piazza

Mall Kelapa Gading comprises several parts Mall Kelapa Gading 1,2,3,5, La Piazza and Gading Food City (Gafoy).

Mal Kelapa Gading opened in 1990, then known as Kelapa Gading Plaza. The mall was expanded in 1995. On April 10, 2003, it was expanded again to the size of 130,000 m^{2} and a total of 600 stores.

=== Gafoy ===
In 2024, a new extension of Mall Kelapa Gading called Gafoy opened, taking up what used to be Gading Food City. Gafoy is a lifestyle center in between Mall Kelapa Gading 1 and La Piazza with restaurants being most of the tenants. Gafoy occupies an area of roughly 11,000 square meters.

=== Ownership ===
The shopping centre is owned and operated by PT Summarecon Agung Tbk., a property company listed on the Indonesia Stock Exchange.

== Structure ==
Mal Kelapa Gading has a total gross area of 130,000 m^{2} on three floors. There are 600 tenants, 30 fashion boutiques, a 6,000 m^{2} food court, three cinemas and several other entertainment facilities.

Mal Kelapa Gading is organized by sections. There are section for clothing (The Catwalk), a teenage shopping area (Fashion Hub), wedding shopping area (Bridal World), a kids' education and entertainment facility (Safari edutainment).

It has 2 food sections, with cafés in the Gourmet Walk and a 6000 m^{2} food court in Food Temptation.

The mall complex includes La Piazza, a structure dedicated to restaurants and cafés. The mall also has entertainment facilities, including a Cinema XXI, 3 Timezone games gallery and a 24-lane bowling Viva bowling alley.

== See also ==
- List of shopping malls in Indonesia
- Kelapa Gading
