= Pemuda =

Pemuda (Indonesian for "youth") may refer to:

- Pancasila Youth (Pemuda Pancasila)
- People's Youth (Indonesia) (Pemuda Rakyat)
- Youth Pledge (Sumpah Pemuda)
