= Jakarta LRT =

Light rapid transit system in Jakarta, Indonesia

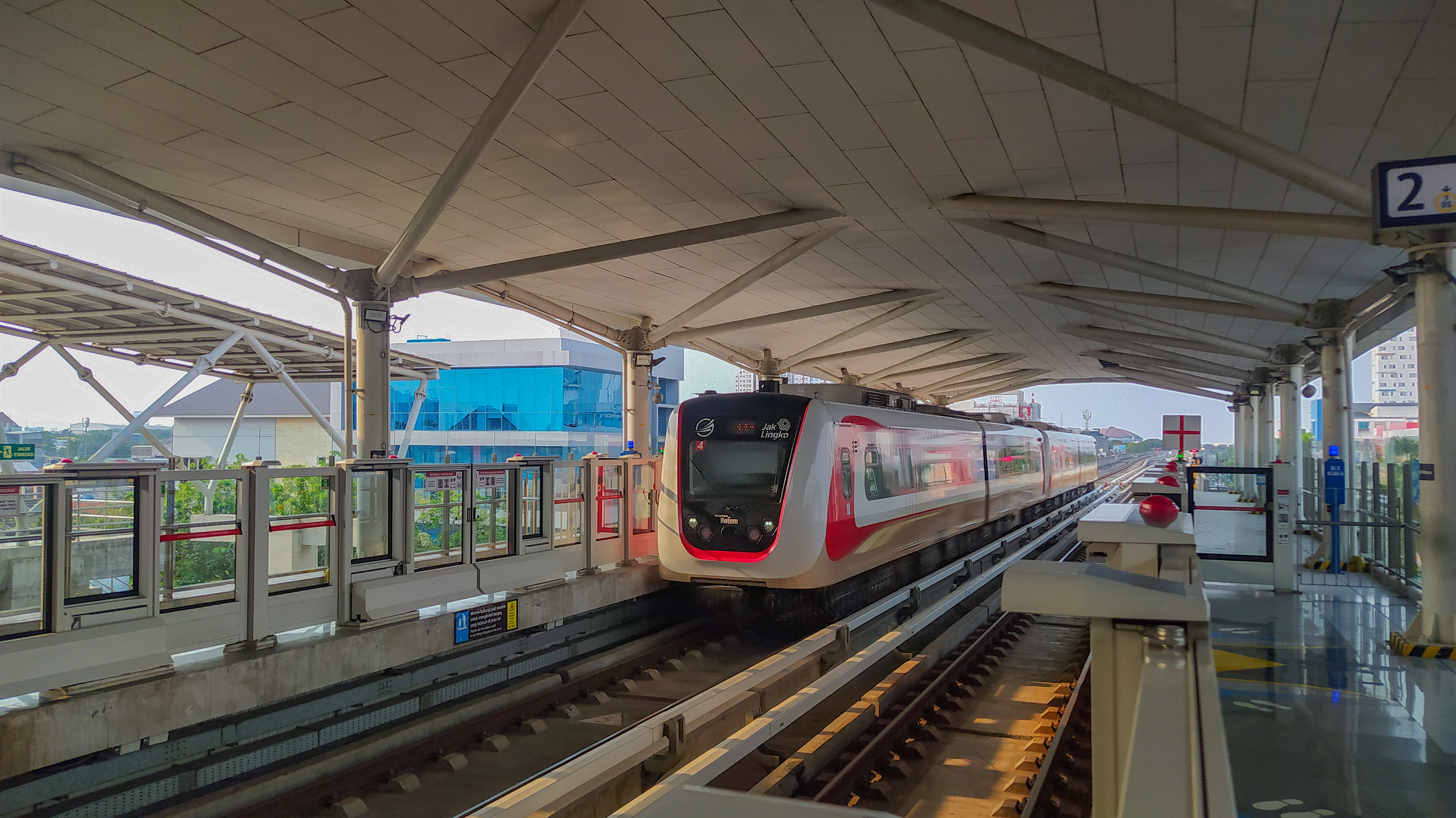
- Jakarta LRT at Boulevard Utara station

Overview
- Owner: Provincial Government of DKI Jakarta
- Locale: Jakarta, Indonesia
- Transit type: Light rapid transit
- Number of lines: 1 (operational); 2 (planned)
- Number of stations: 11 (9 operational, 2 unopened)
- Daily ridership: 11,300 (September 2026)
- Annual ridership: 1.21 million (2024)
- Website: www.lrtjakarta.co.id

Operation
- Began operation: 1 December 2019; 6 years ago
- Operators: PT LRT Jakarta; (PT Jakarta Propertindo)
- Character: Elevated
- Number of vehicles: 8 articulated Hyundai Rotem LRVs
- Headway: 12 minutes (05.30-20.00); 15 minutes (21.00-23.00)

Technical
- System length: 12.2 km (7.6 mi) (operational); 46.8 km (29.1 mi) (planned); 59 km (37 mi) (total)
- Track gauge: 1,435 mm (4 ft 8 1/2 in) standard gauge
- Electrification: 750 V DC from third rail
- Top speed: 80 km/h (50 mph)

The Jakarta Light Rapid Transit or Jakarta LRT (Indonesian: Lintas Rel Terpadu Jakarta, lit. "Jakarta Integrated Rail Line") is one of the light rapid transit systems in Jakarta, the capital city of Indonesia. It is conceived and built by the Jakarta provincial government. Phase 1A of the LRT, from Kelapa Gading to Velodrome, began commercial operations on 1 December 2019. Phase 1B from Velodrome to Manggarai began commercial operations on 16 September 2026.

Jakarta LRT is operated by PT LRT Jakarta, a subsidiary of municipally owned property and infrastructure company PT Jakarta Propertindo (Jakpro).

== History ==
=== Background ===
The proposed LRT system in Jakarta was initially conceived as an alternative to the suspended Jakarta Monorail construction project. The suspension of the monorail project was due to the objection of the Governor of Jakarta, Basuki Tjahaja Purnama, to the construction of the monorail depot above the Setiabudi Reservoir. This decision was made to avoid a recurrence of the 2013 Jakarta flood incident that occurred due to the collapse of the Latuharhari Embankment. The monorail project was ultimately cancelled as the investors failed to meet the advanced requirements set by the Jakarta Provincial Government. Consequently, the LRT project became the priority, with Governor Basuki Tjahaja Purnama expressing his hope for greater consistency and fewer setbacks compared to the discontinued monorail project.

The plan for the construction of the Jakarta LRT refers to Presidential Regulation Number 99 of 2015 concerning the Acceleration of the Implementation of Public Transportation on the Special Capital Region of Jakarta Province. As part of the preparation for the 2018 Asian Games, the Jakarta LRT was designated as a complementary public transportation system, and to facilitate its construction, the Governor of Jakarta directly appointed PT Jakarta Propertindo and PT Pembangunan Jaya for the project.

=== Phase 1 ===
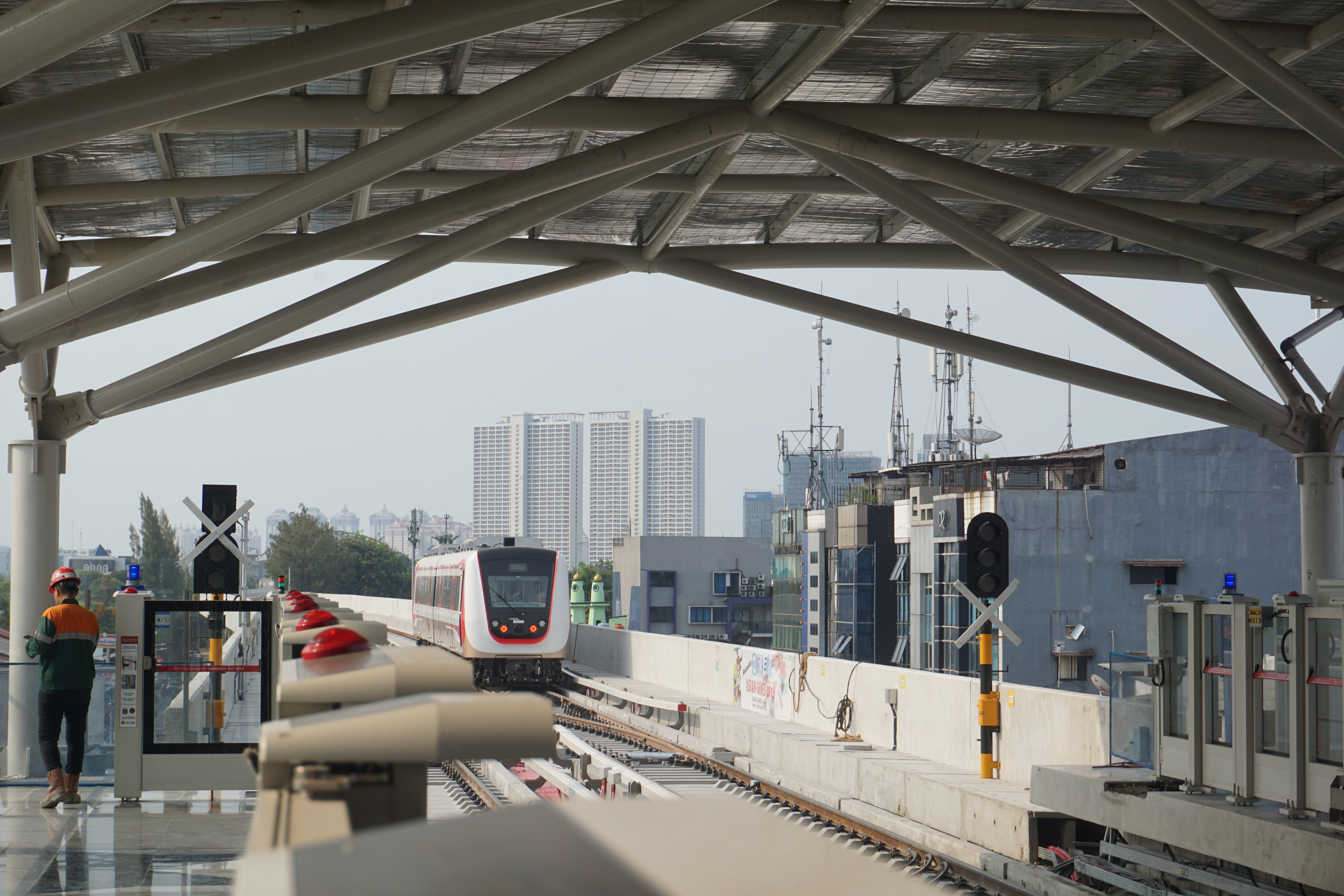
Hyundai Rotem train leaving Velodrome station during a limited trial run on 7 September 2018

The groundbreaking of the Jakarta LRT was previously planned to be held in conjunction with the Jabodebek LRT groundbreaking in September 2015. The Jakarta LRT groundbreaking was held on 22 June 2016, coinciding with the 489th Anniversary of the City of Jakarta. In December 2016, PT Wijaya Karya was appointed as the contractor for the LRT construction project worth Rp5.29 trillion (around US$347.6 million). The construction itself only started in early 2017 after the land preparation process had been completed.

The Jakarta LRT project seeks to address the issue of heavy traffic congestion on the city's roads. The rolling stock comes from Hyundai Rotem from South Korea which was first arrived from the Tanjung Priok Port on April 13, 2018. Each trainset consists of two cars and will be able to carry 270 to 278 passengers. There will be a total of 16 cars. Platform screen doors by ST Engineering Electronics will be installed at all stations. To build the site, BCA had disbursed 2.78 trillion rupiahs of their syndicated loans.

The completion target of the Jakarta LRT construction before the 2018 Asian Games was not met, resulting in the limited operation of the LRT during the competition as a trial run. The limited trial run was carried out starting August 15, 2018.

A full public trial run began on 11 June 2019 between Boulevard Utara and Velodrome stations, with free admission to registered ticket holders. Since commercial operation began in December 2019, the "flagging" system has seen falling ridership, with an average of 4,364 passengers per day.

==== Phase 1B ====
The groundbreaking for phase 1B was held on 30 October 2023. PT Waskita Karya was appointed as the constructor for phase 1B. The project would serve as an extension to the already operational Phase 1 line from Velodrome to Kelapa Gading. The plan is to build 6.4 km (4.0 mi) of new tracks and five new stations; Pemuda Rawamangun (now Rawamangun), Pramuka BPKP (Pramuka), Pasar Pramuka (Matraman), Matraman (Proklamasi), and Manggarai. Phase 1B costed Rp5.5 trillion, all were funded via Jakarta's own provincial budget. The Acting Governor of DKI Jakarta, Heru Budi Hartono, said that Phase 1B will run from 2024 to 2026, with construction from Rawamangun to Pramuka stations finishing in September 2024 and the rest following in 2026. Once finished, commercial operations for phase 1B began on 16 September 2026, after being inaugurated by the President of Indonesia, Prabowo Subianto. On 11 November 2026, Pramuka station was opened for passenger service. On the same day, an overhead bridge linking Manggarai LRT Station to Manggarai Bus Terminal was also opened to ease transfer between the two modes.

== System network ==
The Jakarta LRT is expected to stretch across over 59.0 kilometres (36.7 mi), including 26.9 kilometres (16.7 mi) for the South line (from Kelapa Gading to Pesing), 22.7 kilometres (14.1 mi) for the North line (from Pesing to JIS), and 9.4 kilometres (5.8 mi) for the South East line (from Velodrome to Halim).

| Colour and Line Name | Phase | Service Commencement | Termini | Stations | Length | Depot |
Operational
| South Line | 1A | 1 December 2019 (Kelapa Gading–Velodrome) | Kelapa Gading; Manggarai | 11 | 12.2 km (7.6 mi) | Pegangsaan Dua |
| South Line | 1B | 16 September 2026 (Velodrome–Manggarai) | Kelapa Gading; Manggarai | 11 | 12.2 km (7.6 mi) | Pegangsaan Dua |
Planned
| South Line | 1C | 2028 | Manggarai; Dukuh Atas | 1 | 2.4 km (1.5 mi) | Pegangsaan Dua |
| South Line | 1D | TBA | Dukuh Atas; Pesing | 13 | 12.3 km (7.6 mi) | Pegangsaan Dua |
| North Line | 1E | TBA | Pesing; Rajawali | 6 | 8.9 km (5.5 mi) | Pegangsaan Dua |
| North Line | 2A | TBA | Kelapa Gading; JIS | 6 | 8.2 km (5.1 mi) | Pegangsaan Dua |
| South East Line | 2B | TBA | Velodrom; Klender | 4 | 4.5 km (2.8 mi) | Pegangsaan Dua |
| North Line | 3A | TBA | JIS; Rajawali | 4 | 5.6 km (3.5 mi) | Pegangsaan Dua |
| South East Line | 3B | TBA | Klender; Halim | 4 | 4.9 km (3.0 mi) | Pegangsaan Dua |

=== Southern Line ===
==== Operational ====
- Phase 1 - Kelapa Gading - Manggarai, along 12.2 km

| Station Number | Station Name | Region |
Phase 1
| S01 U01 | Kelapa Gading | North Jakarta |
| S02 | Boulevard Utara | North Jakarta |
| S03 | Boulevard Selatan | North Jakarta |
| S04 | Pulomas | East Jakarta |
| S05 | Equestrian | East Jakarta |
| S06 | Velodrome | East Jakarta |
| S07 | Rawamangun | East Jakarta |
| S08 | Pramuka | East Jakarta |
| S09 | Matraman (u/c) | East Jakarta |
| S10 | Proklamasi (u/c) | East Jakarta |
| S11 | Manggarai | South Jakarta |
Phase 1C (planned): Manggarai-Dukuh Atas
| S12 | Dukuh Atas | South Jakarta |
Phase 2B (under feasibility study): Velodrome–Klender
| S12 | Pemuda | East Jakarta |
| S13 | Pulo Gadung Barat | East Jakarta |
| S14 | Jayakarta | East Jakarta |
| S15 | Klender | East Jakarta |
Phase 3B (under feasibility study): Klender–Halim
| S16 | Pahlawan Revolusi | East Jakarta |
| S17 | Pondok Bambu Utara | East Jakarta |
| S18 | Kalimalang | East Jakarta |
| S19 | Halim | East Jakarta |

Construction of Route 1 started on 22 June 2016. The first six kilometers of the route connecting the Kelapa Gading Depot to Velodrome Station was 29.61% complete by 26 June 2017. It was expected to be operational before the 2018 Asian Games. However, this did not happen as construction is not yet finished and the Indonesia Asian Games Organizing Committee (INASGOC) considered that buses would be more effective in transporting the athletes.

The test run for the LRT was initially scheduled for 10 August, however was delayed to 15 August 2018. Phase 1 was planned to begin operation in February, 2019. After several delays, the line opened for free public trial run from July to late November 2019. Commercial operations began on 1 December 2019.

=== Northern Line (Planned) ===
| Station numbers | Stations | Location |
Phase 2A (under feasibility study): Pegangsaan Dua–Jakarta International Stadium (JIS)
| U01 S01 | Kelapa Gading | North Jakarta |
| U02 | Kelapa Nias | North Jakarta |
| U03 | Boulevard Gading | North Jakarta |
| U04 | Sunter Timur | North Jakarta |
| U05 | Gelanggang Remaja | North Jakarta |
| U06 | Sunter Barat | North Jakarta |
| U07 | JIS | North Jakarta |
Phase 3A (under feasibility study): Jakarta International Stadium (JIS)–Rajawali
| U08 | Martadinata | North Jakarta |
| U09 | Benyamin Sueb | North Jakarta |
| U10 | Kemayoran | North Jakarta |
| U11 | Rajawali | Central Jakarta |

== Future development ==
=== Pembangunan Jaya LRT (LRT KPDBU) ===
Apart from the North and South Line plans, the Jakarta Provincial Government is also planning the construction of the Pulogebang-Joglo LRT route for 32.15 km (19.98 mi). This line procurement is carried out under the Regional Government and Business Entity Cooperation scheme between the Jakarta Provincial Government and PT Pembangunan Jaya.

== Ticket and fare ==
LRT Jakarta begun collecting fares from 1 December 2019. On the entire system, passengers pay a flat fare of Rp 5.000.

LRT Jakarta accept both cash and cashless payment. Cash payment are accepted to pay single trip tickets. Passengers must deposit of Rp 15.000 in addition to journey fare, which could be refunded within 7 days after last tapping out at exit gate.

Cashless payment methods accepted are prepaid cards and electronic wallet. Prepaid cards accepted include e-money (Bank Mandiri), Flazz (Bank BCA), TapCash (Bank BNI), Brizzi (Bank BRI) Jakcard (Bank Jakarta), and Multi Trip Card (KAI Commuter). LRT Jakarta also accepts Jak Lingko-branded payment cards provided by Bank Jakarta, Bank Mandiri, Bank BRI, and Bank BNI. Fares are deducted from these prepaid cards upon exiting. From 3 August 2020, LRT Jakarta accepts payment from electronic wallet. To date it only accepts wallets provided by LinkAja. Passengers only need to scan QR code at the entry gate to pay directly from their LinkAja e-wallet.

== See also ==
- Greater Jakarta Integrated Mass Transit System
- Transport in Indonesia
- Transport in Jakarta
  - KRL Commuterline
  - Jakarta MRT
  - Jabodebek LRT
  - TransJakarta
- Rail transport in Indonesia
