= Kelapa Gading LRT station =

Light rapid transit station in North Jakarta, Indonesia

S01 Kelapa Gading Station Stasiun Kelapa Gading
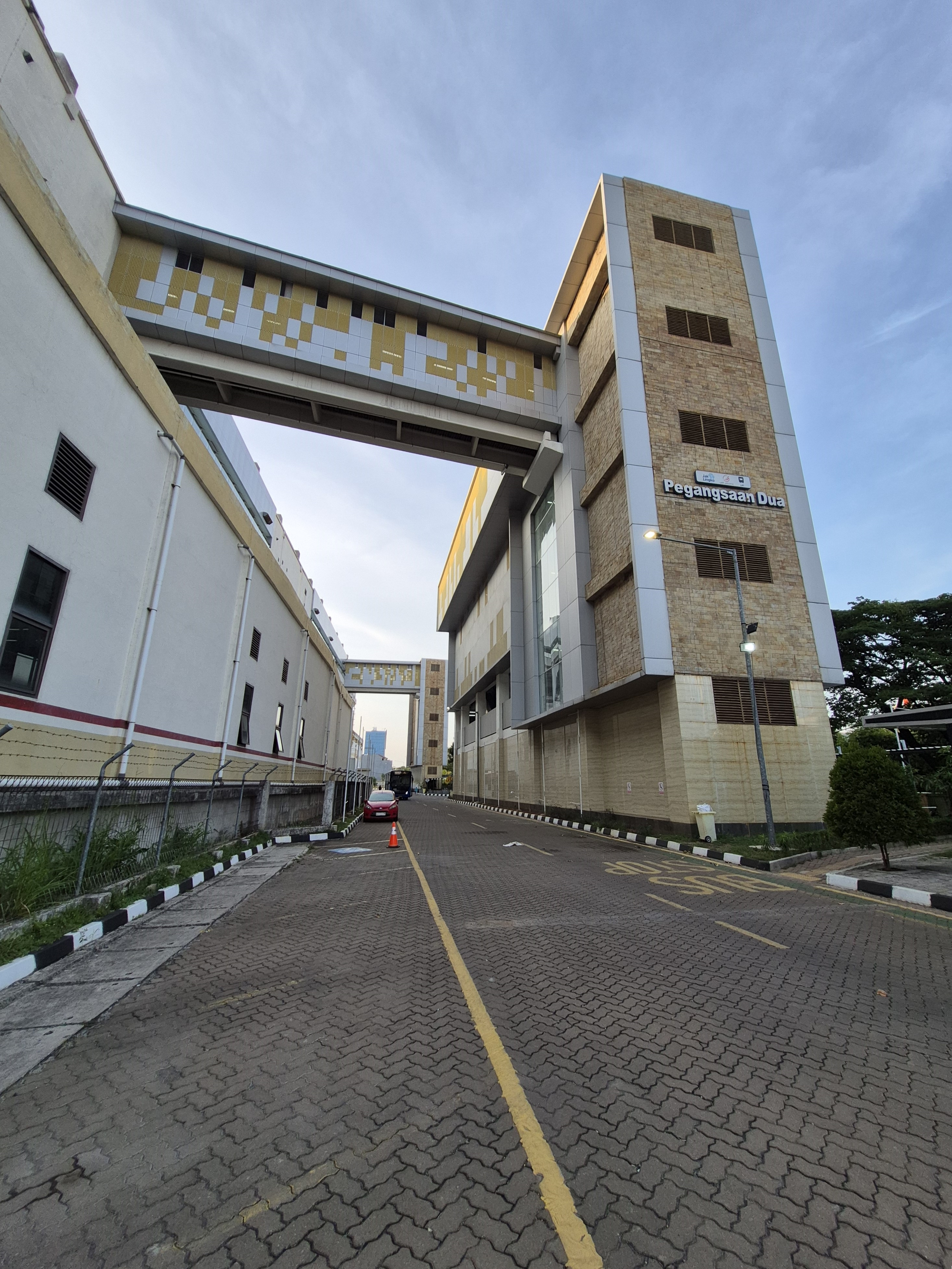
- The frontage of the LRT station, when it was still named "Pegangsaan Dua", 2024

General information
- Location: Jl. Gading Grande, Pegangsaan Dua, Kelapa Gading, North Jakarta; Jakarta; Indonesia
- Coordinates: 6.15579°S 106.91424°E
- System: Jakarta LRT station
- Owner: Regional Government of Special Capital Region of Jakarta
- Operator: Jakarta Propertindo
- Line: Southern Line
- Platforms: single island platform
- Tracks: 2
- Connections: Transjakarta: 12P; MikroTrans Jak Lingko: JAK-60, JAK-112

Construction
- Structure type: Elevated
- Parking: Available
- Cycle facilities: Available
- Accessible: Available

Other information
- Station code: S-01

History
- Opened: 26 September 2019 trial 1 December 2019 full

Services
Preceding station	Jakarta LRT	Following station
Terminus	Southern Line	Boulevard Utara Summarecon Mall towards Manggarai
Route map
Location
- Location within Jakarta

Kelapa Gading Station (formerly known as Pegangsaan Dua Station) is a light rapid transit station of the Jakarta LRT Southern Line in Jakarta, Indonesia. It is located at Pegangsaan Dua, Kelapa Gading, North Jakarta. The station is in a one complex with a depot and is the largest station with a total area of 12 ha (120,000 m^{2}).

== History ==
Kelapa Gading Station is one of the six stations of the first phase of Jakarta LRT Southern Line which opened on 1 December 2019, previously named Pegangsaan Dua Station after an adjacent street to the east.

In early August 2026, Pegangsaan Dua was renamed into Kelapa Gading Station due to the fact that it is indeed located within the district of the same name. According to Jakarta Governor Pramono Anung, the renaming was done to avoid ambiguity over the word "Pegangsaan", as Proklamasi Station (part of the LRT extension to Manggarai) is located near Proklamasi street (where the Indonesian Independence Proclamation was read in 1945) that used to be called "Pegangsaan Timur".

== Station layout ==
3rd floor	Corridor	Skybridge, ticket vending machines, ticket counters and fare gates
2nd floor	Line 1	↔ (Boulevard Utara Summarecon Mall)	Southern Line from and towards Manggarai
2nd floor	Island platform, the doors are opened on the left (line 1) or right (line 2) sides.
2nd floor	Line 2	↔ (Boulevard Utara Summarecon Mall)	Southern Line from and towards Manggarai
1st floor	Street	Entrance/exit, feeder bus stop

== Services ==
- Southern Line, to Manggarai
