= Musalla =

Islamic prayer space, particularly for Eid or funerary prayers

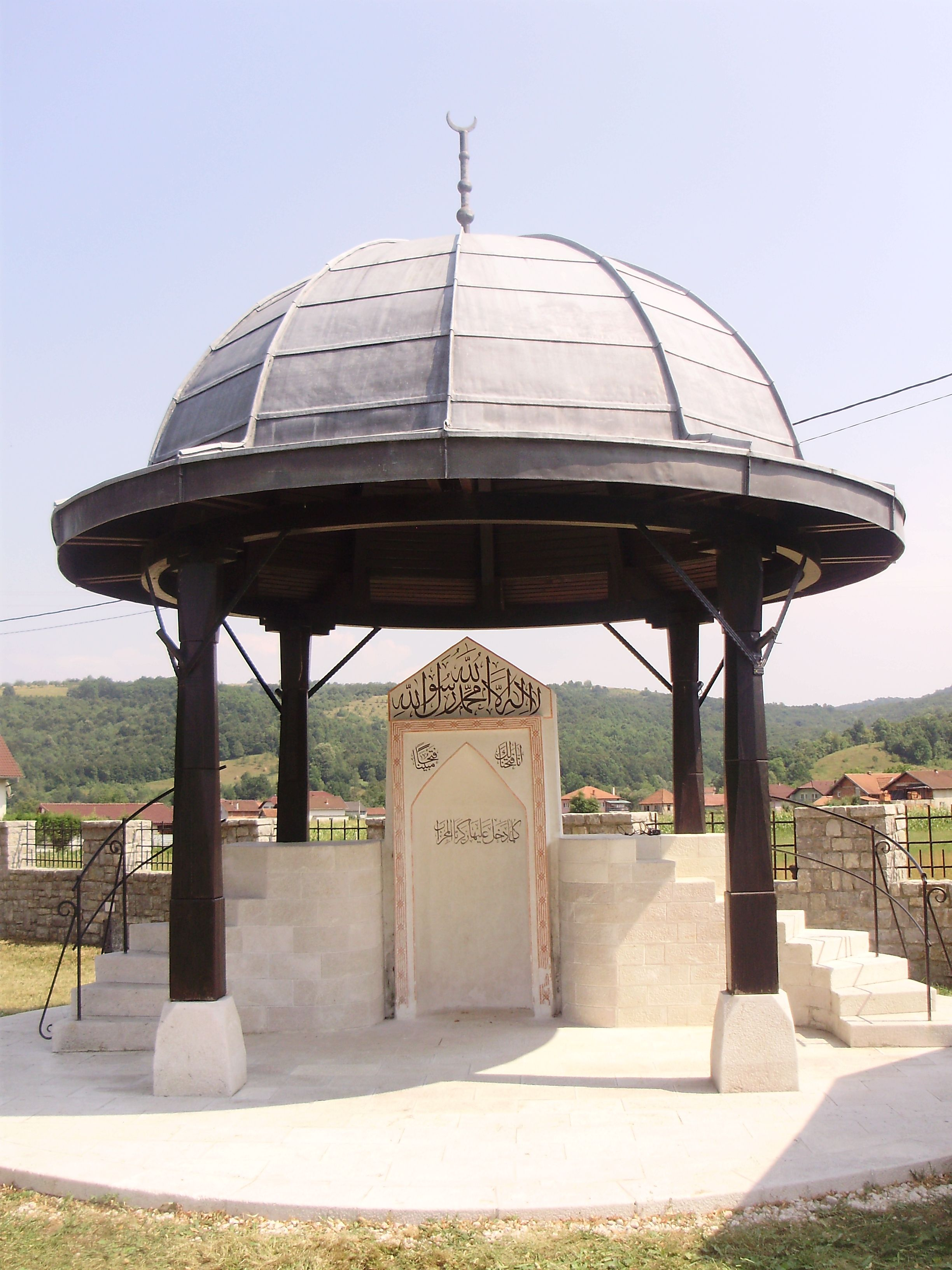
Fatihova Musalla

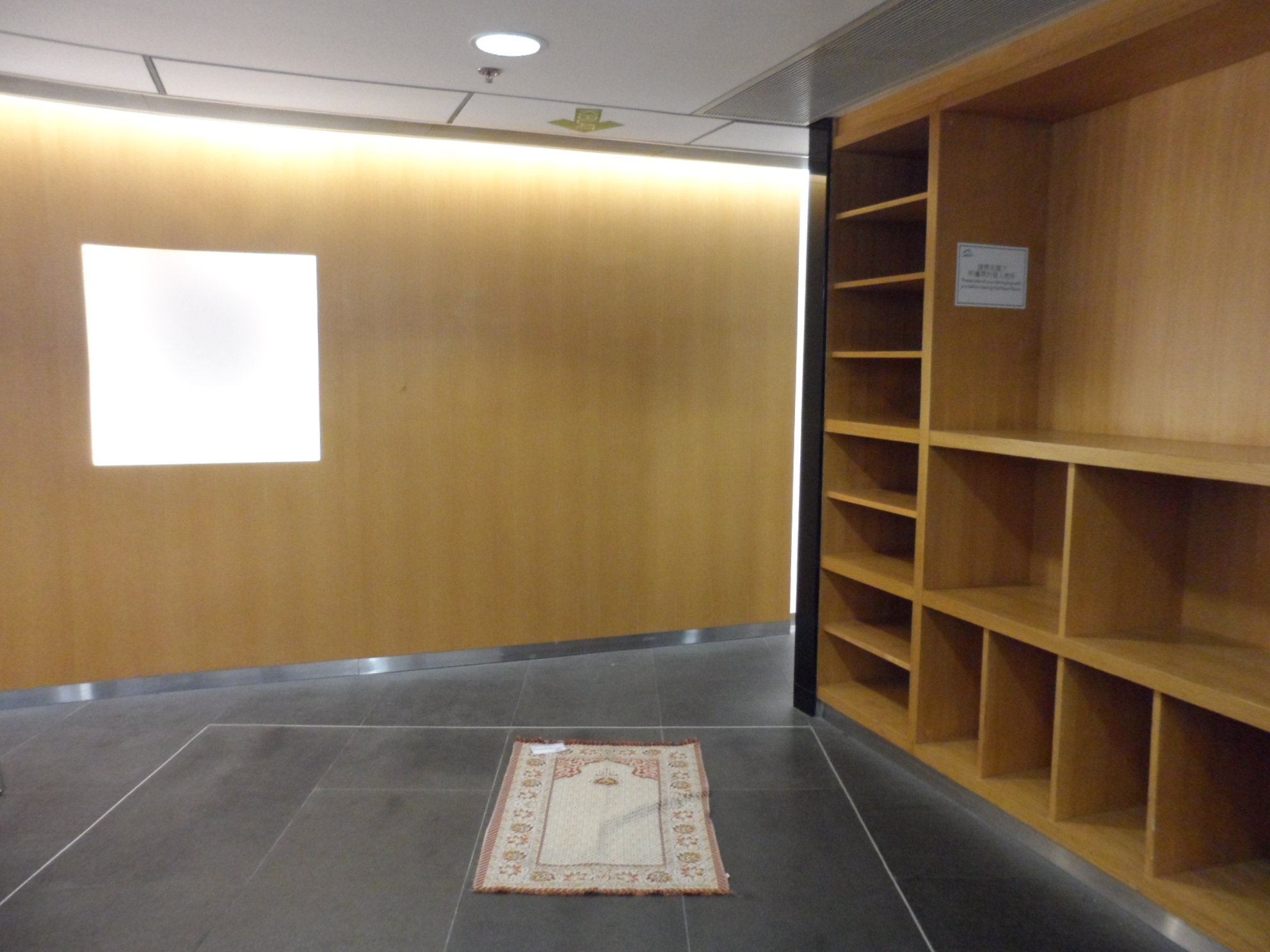
Muslim prayer section (musalla) at Hong Kong International Airport

A musalla (Arabic: مصلى, romanized: muṣallā) is a space that is not a mosque, mainly used for prayer in Islam. The word is derived from the verb صلى (ṣallā), meaning "to pray". One use is for the twice-yearly Eid prayers (ʿĪd al-Fiṭr and ʿĪd al-Aḍḥā) and sometimes for funeral prayers as per the Sunnah.

“Musalla” may also refer to a room, structure, or place for performing salah (canonical prayers), and this is also translated as a “prayer hall” when smaller than a mosque. It is often used for conducting the five mandatory daily prayers, or other prayers in (or without) a small congregation, but not for large congregational worship such as the Friday Prayers or the Eid Prayers (the latter is done in jama masjid (congregational mosques) if there is no available musalla, in the original sense of an open space). Such musallas are usually present in airports, malls, universities, and other public places in Muslim-majority countries, as well as in some non-Muslim countries for the use of Muslims. A musalla will usually not contain a minbar.

== See also ==
- Eidgah
- Mosque
- Surau, equivalent structure in Malay-speaking countries
- Jama'at Khana
