= Krenceng–Merak railway =

Rail line in Banten, Indonesia

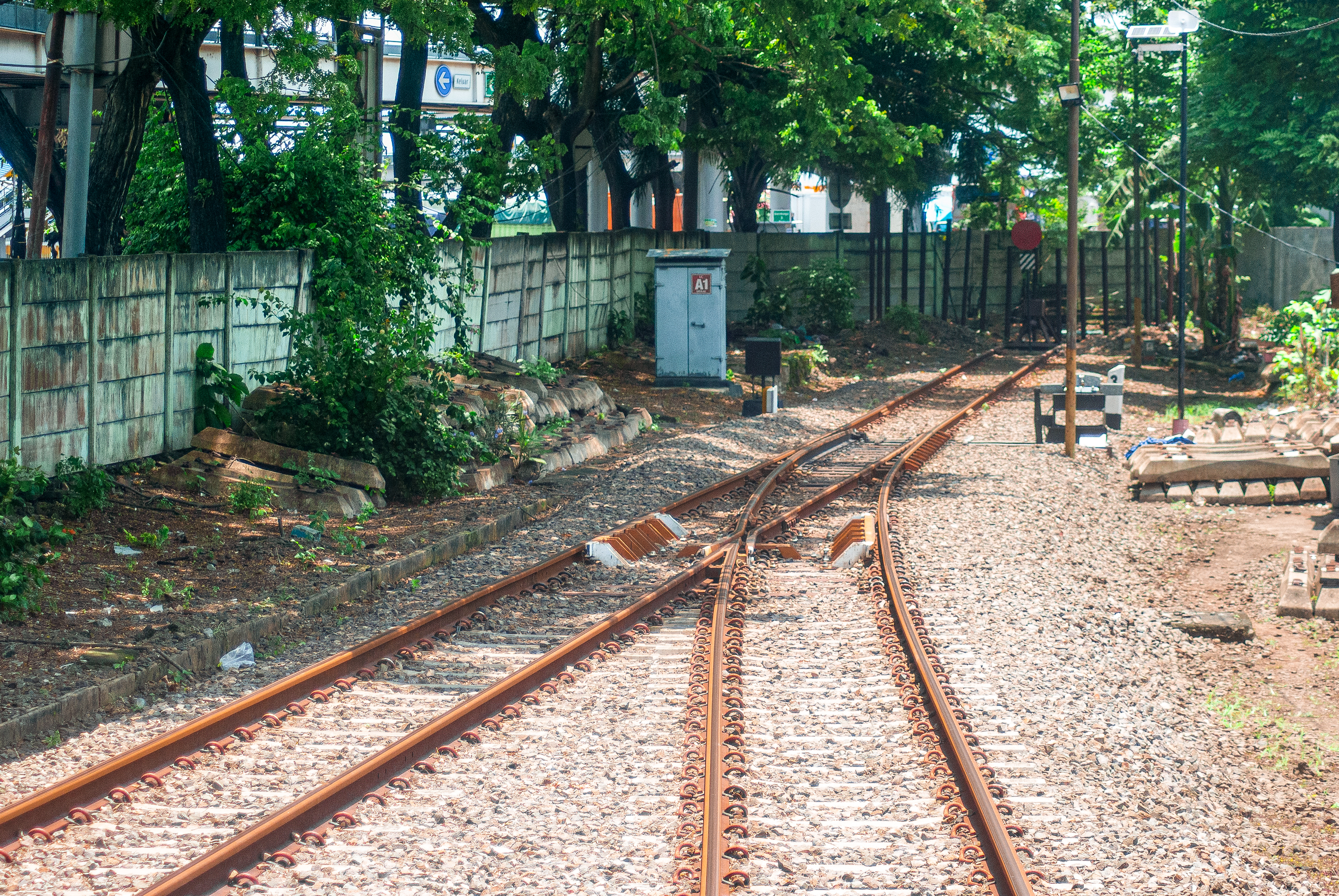
- Shunting switch in Merak Station, 2023

Overview
- Native name: Jalur kereta api Krenceng–Merak
- Status: Operational
- Owner: Directorate General of Railways (DJKA)
- Locale: Krenceng-Merak, Banten
- Termini: Krenceng; Merak
- Stations: 2

Service
- Type: Commuter rail
- Operator(s): PT Kereta Api Indonesia and KAI Commuter

History
- Opened: 1 December 1916

Technical
- Number of tracks: 1
- Track gauge: 1,067 mm (3 ft 6 in)
- Electrification: not available

Krenceng–Merak railway is a railway line in Banten on the island of Java, Indonesia, which runs between Krenceng and Merak. It is the successor of the Jakarta Kota–Anyer Kidul railway, which opened in 1900 when it was a part of the Dutch East Indies and ran to Anyer Kidul.

== History ==
The railway line from Rangkasbitung railway station was continued in its construction by Staatsspoorwegen (SS) to the Serang area on 1 July 1900, which was then continued again to near the Port of Anyer Kidul on 1 December 1900. On 1 December 1914, a Branch line was made at Krenceng which headed to the Merak area to accommodate the Merak Port which was closer for crossing to Lampung in Sumatra.

== Service ==
The Merak Commuter Line, passes the Krenceng-Merak railway line between Merak and Rangkasbitung.

== See also ==
- Jakarta Kota–Anyer Kidul railway
