= Tonjong Baru railway station =

Railway station in Indonesia

LM08 Tonjong Baru Station Stasiun Tonjong Baru
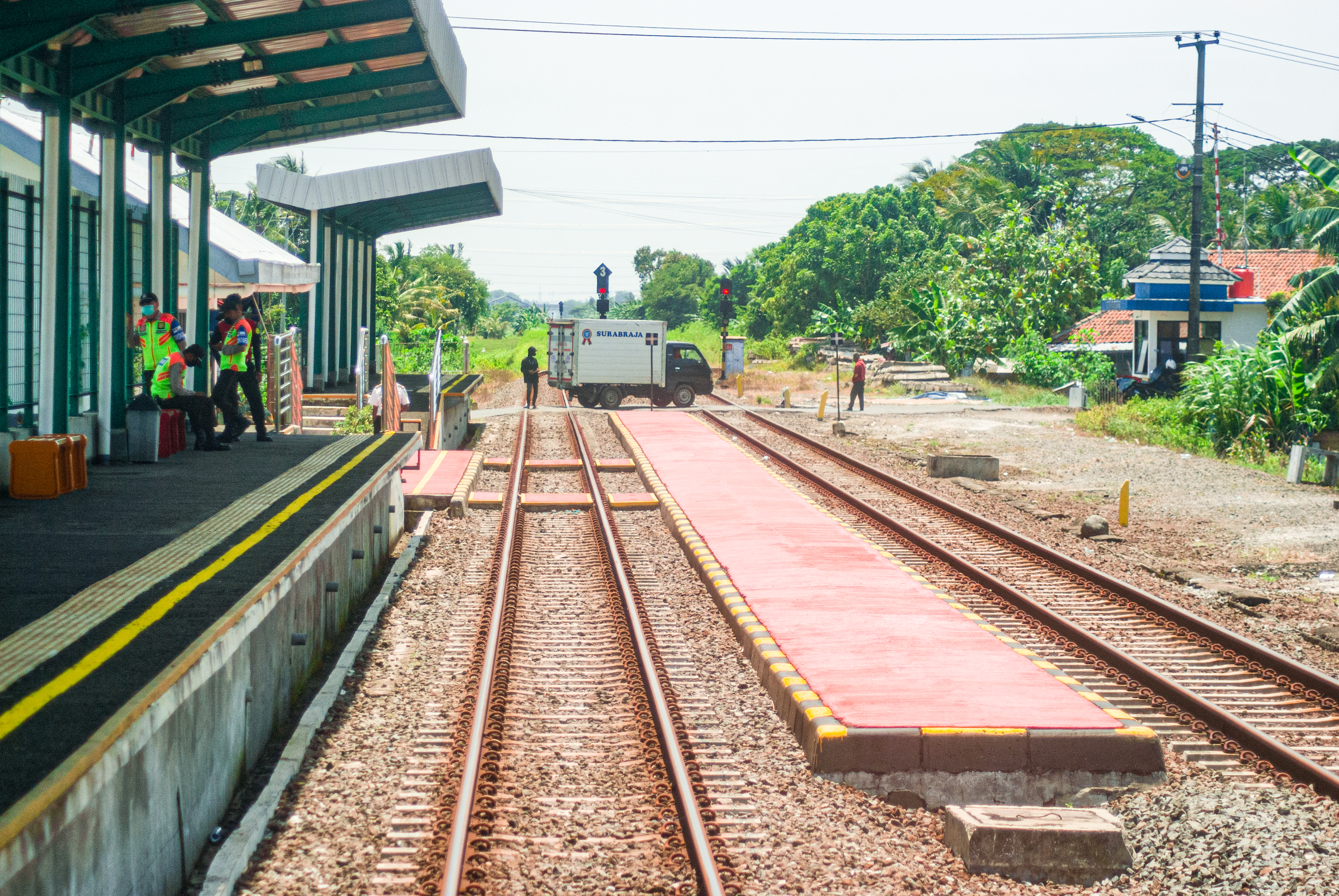
- The emplacement of Tonjong Baru Station, photo was taken on 18 March 2023.

General information
- Location: Tonjong, Kramatwatu, Serang Regency; Banten; Indonesia
- Coordinates: 6.031323°S 106.121419°E
- Elevation: +4 m (13 ft)
- Owner: Kereta Api Indonesia
- Operator: KAI Commuter
- Lines: Merak–Tanah Abang railway; LM Merak Local
- Platforms: 1 island platform 1 side platform
- Tracks: 3

Construction
- Structure type: Ground
- Parking: Available
- Accessible: Available

Other information
- Station code: TOJB • 0108 • TONJONG
- Classification: Class III

History
- Opened: 20 December 1900
- Rebuilt: 1950s; 1990s (current location)

Services
Preceding station		Following station
Karangantu towards Rangkasbitung	Merak Local	Cilegon towards Merak
Location
- Location within Java

Tonjong Baru Station (TOJB) is a class III railway station located in Tonjong, Kramatwatu, Serang Regency, Banten. The station, which is located at an altitude of +4 m, is included in the Operation Area I Jakarta.

== History ==
The construction of the railroad line from Rangkasbitung Station was continued by Staatsspoorwegen (SS) to the Serang area on 1 July 1900, which was then resumed to near Anyer Kidul Harbor on 1 December 1900. On 1 December 1914, a new railway line was made which leads to Merak to accommodate Port of Merak which is closer to crossing to Lampung.

Tondjong Station (which later became known as Tonjong Baru) was built after the independence era, to be precise in the 1950s. It is estimated that the existing station building is also a relocated station, and not the original station location as it was when it was originally built. The old station building was located to the west of the current station, precisely under the Jakarta–Merak Toll Road. The original Tondjong Station was demolished to make way for a planned container terminal in the 1990s, and now the building has disappeared.

In the past, there was a Banten halt in the compartment between Tonjong Baru Station and Karangantu Station, but now this halt is no longer active.

In 2001, a container train was run from Bojonegara Harbor to Kalimas Station. For the purposes of this transportation, a branch line was made from Tonjong Baru Station which leads to Bojonegara Harbor. The train journey took 28 hours and 43 minutes, almost the same as the Cilegon-Kalimas Baja Satwa train at that time, which took 29 hours. The Bojonegara-Kalimas container train only lasted 2–3 years, until finally the link was cut to become Kalimas-Sungai Lagoa. The former branch of the line from Tonjong Baru Station that leads to Bojonegara Harbor was not used anymore, until it was demolished.

== Building and layout ==
This station has two railway tracks with track 2 being a straight line. There is land on the former line 3 which previously served as a badug and a save route, and line 3 is connected to a branch line that leads to Bojonegara Port.

At this station there is a container terminal and this station will also be the starting point for the construction of the Logistics Railway to the Port of Bojonegara. However, the construction of the rail to the port is still hampered due to unfinished land acquisition and is planned to be made as a starting point for the transportation of livestock.

== Services ==
The following is a list of train services at the Tonjong Baru Station.

=== Passenger Services ===
- KAI Commuter

LM Merak Local, to Rangkasbitung and Merak

== Gallery ==
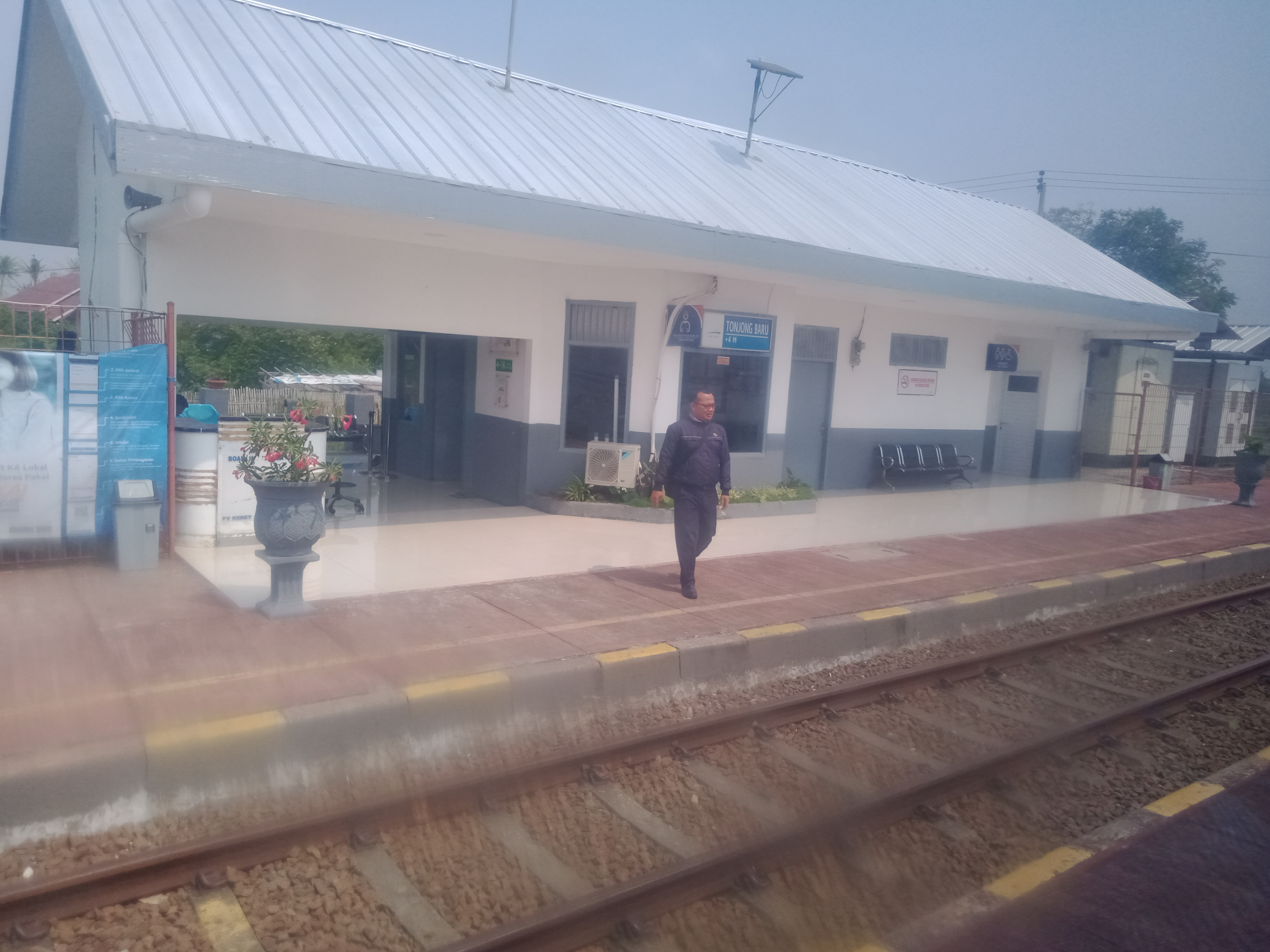
The main building of the station, taken on 3 July 2019

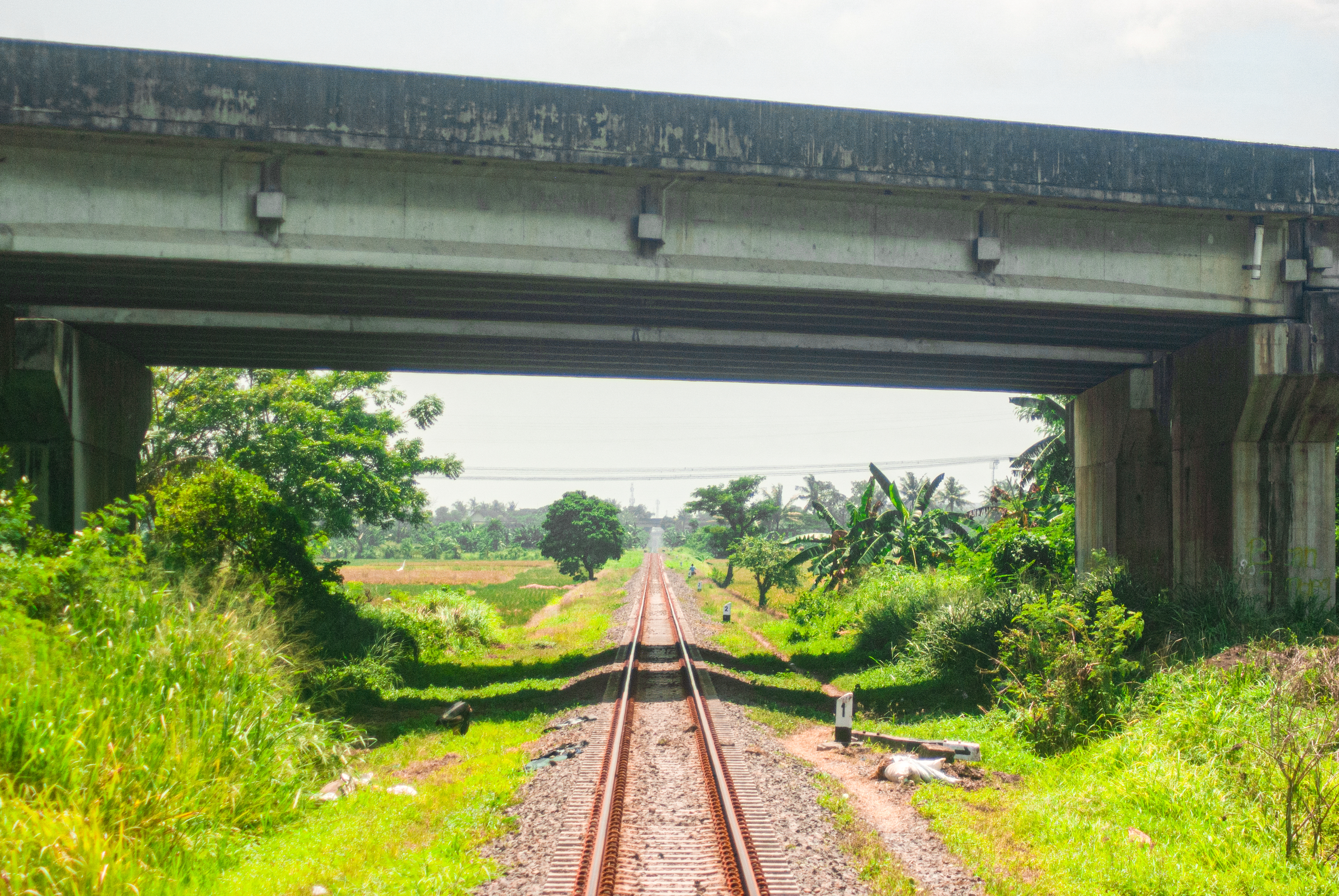
The former location of Tondjong station below the Jakarta–Merak Toll Road

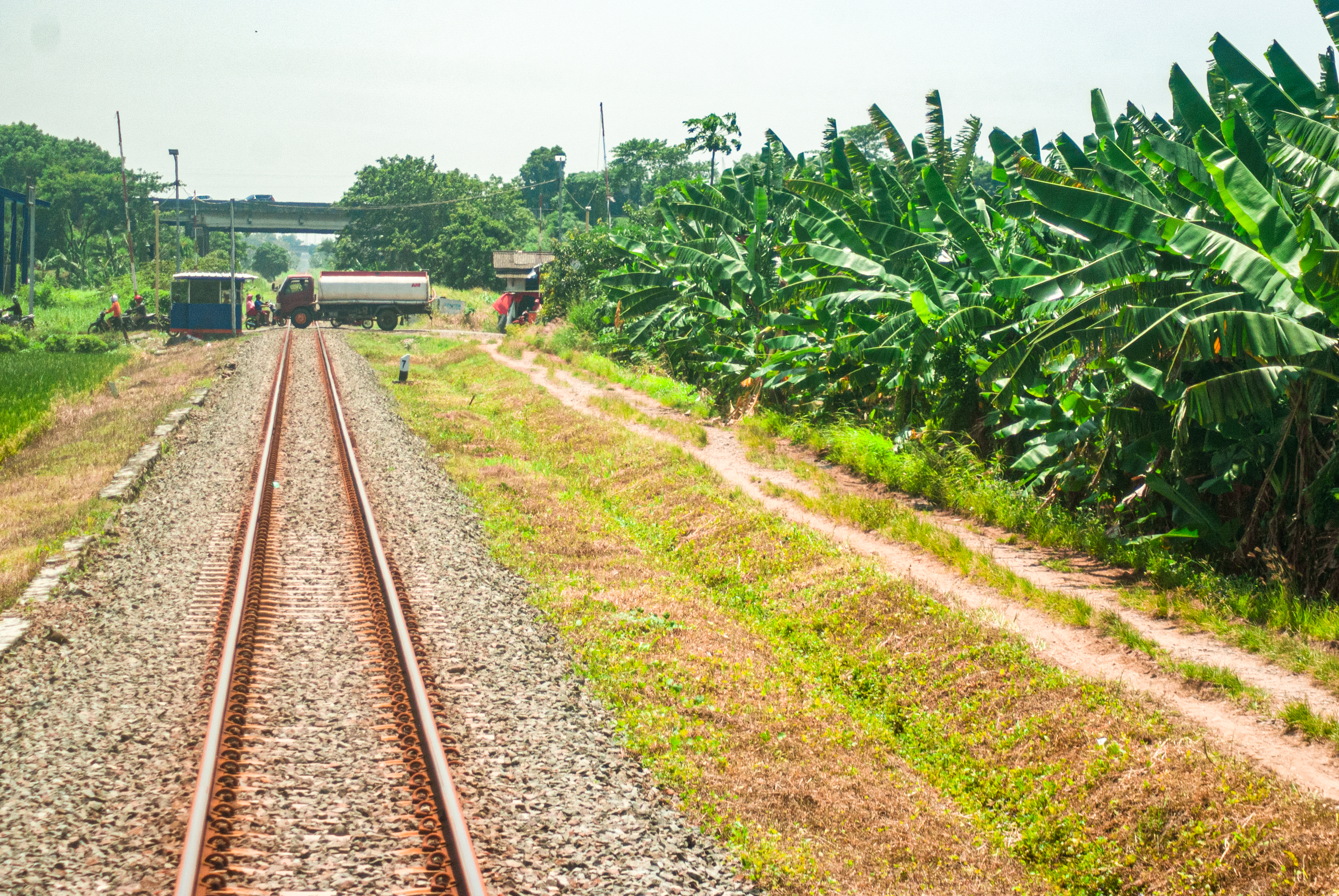
The former branch line railbed to Port of Bojanegara (right)

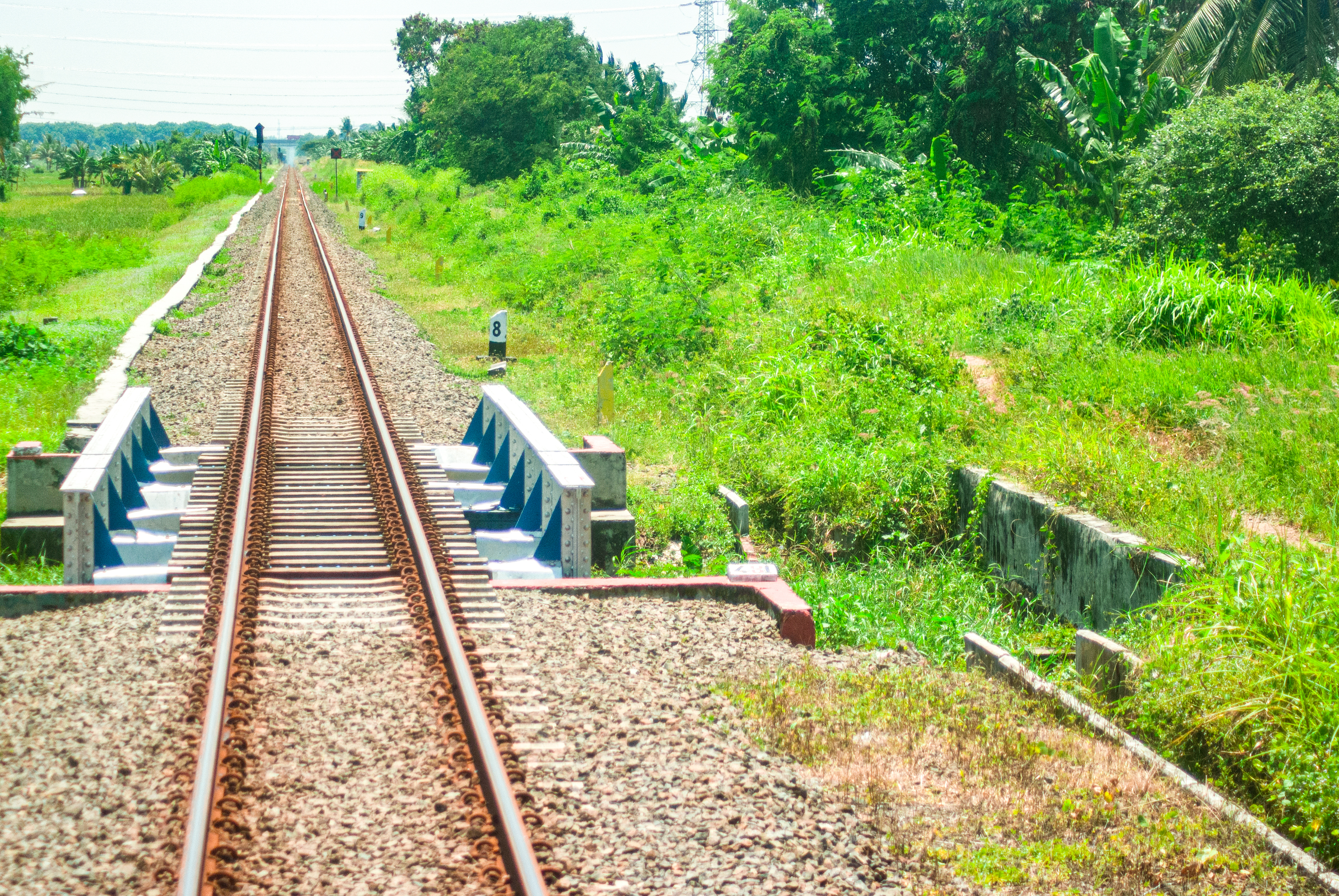
The former branch line bridge to the Port of Bojanegara

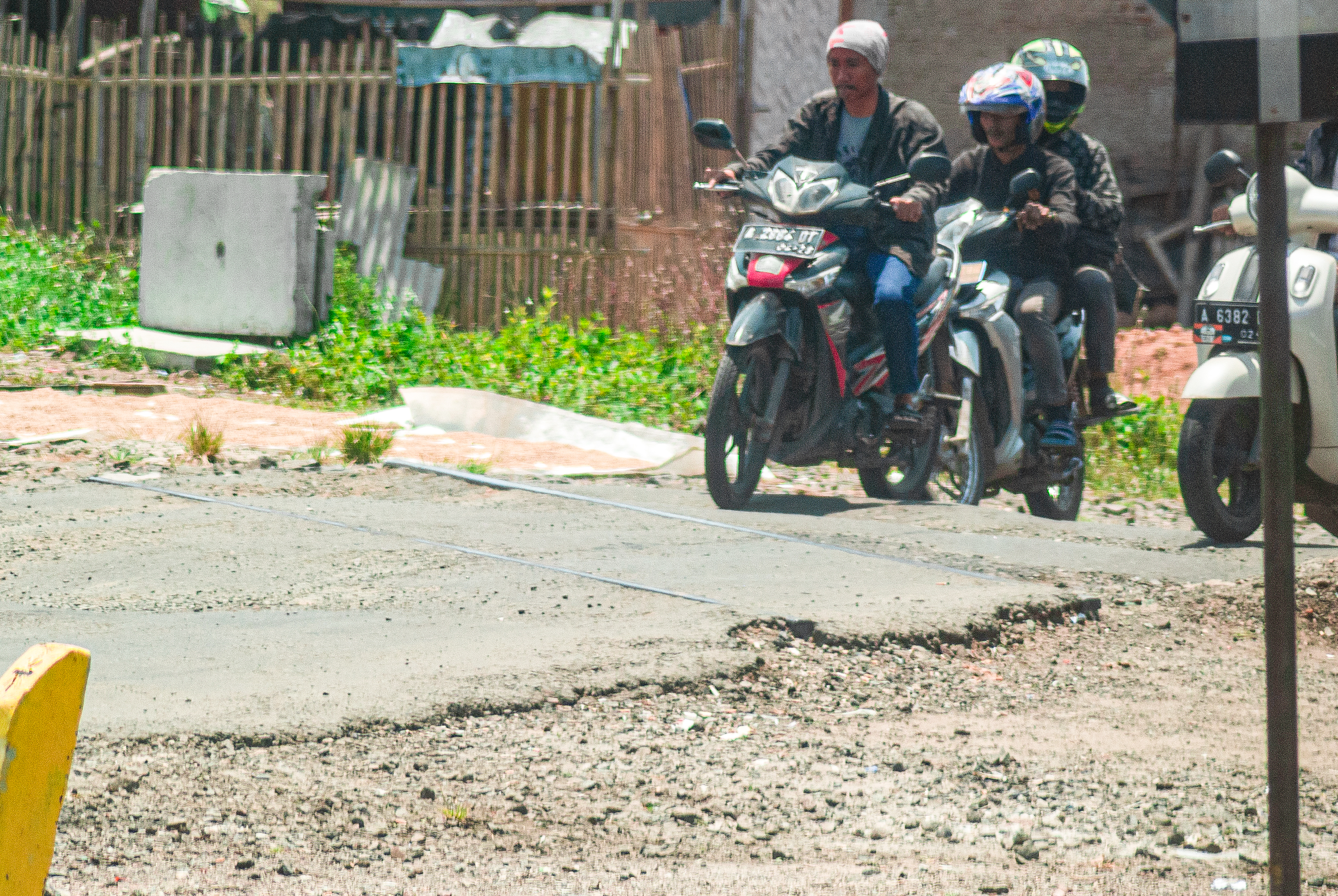
Remainings of line 3 rail pieces on the asphalt of level crossing at Tonjong Baru Station

Preceding station	Kereta Api Indonesia	Following station
Cilegon towards Merak	Merak–Tanah Abang	Karangantu towards Tanah Abang
