= Serang railway station =

Railway station in Indonesia

LM06 Serang Station Stasiun Serang
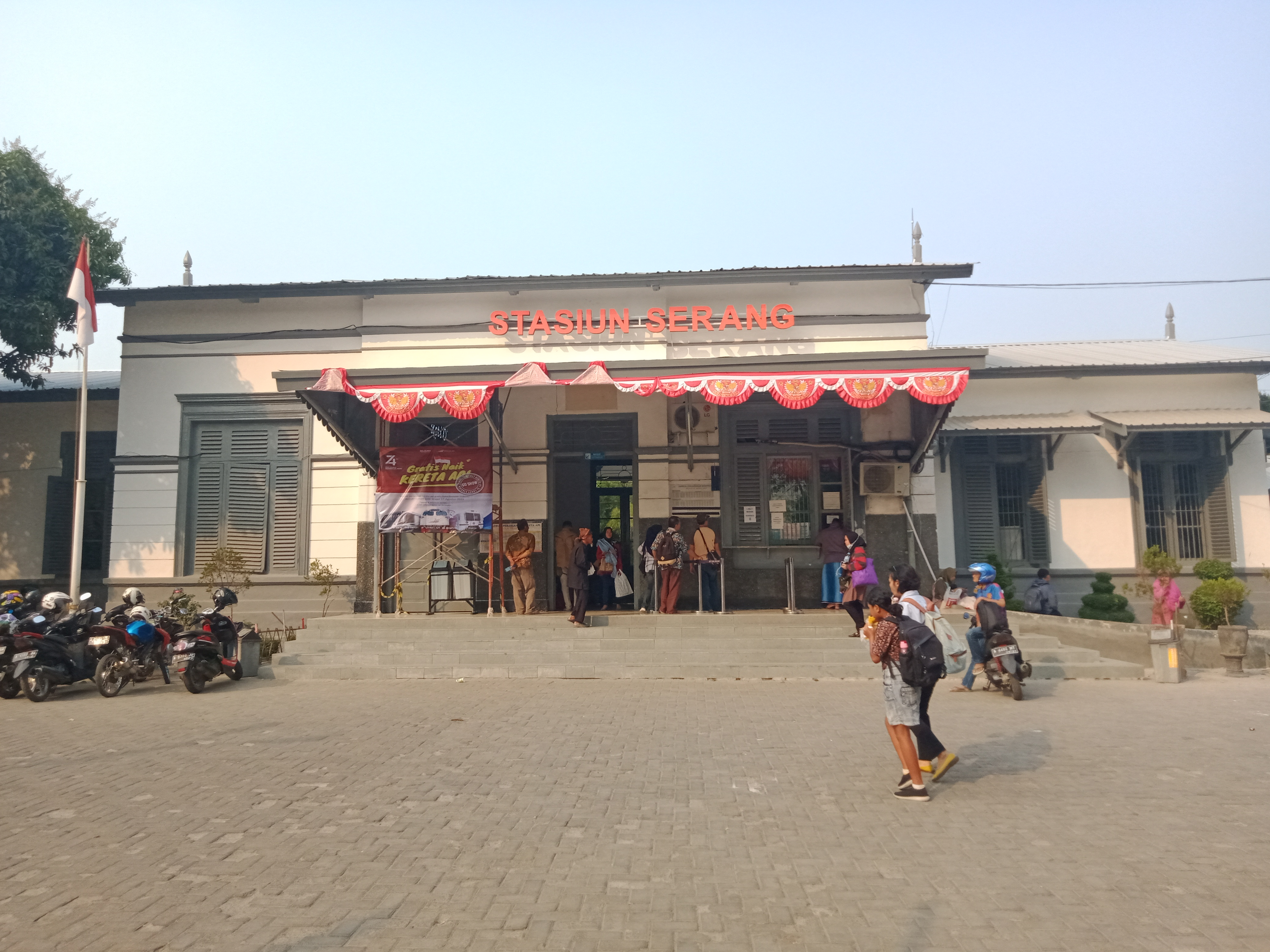
- The station entrance, as of August 2019

General information
- Location: Jl. Ki Tapa 2, Cimuncang, Serang, Serang; Indonesia
- Coordinates: 6.1124°S 106.1586°E
- Elevation: +17 m (56 ft)
- Owner: Kereta Api Indonesia
- Operator: KAI Commuter
- Lines: Merak–Tanah Abang; LM Merak Commuter Line
- Platforms: 1 side platform 1 island platform
- Tracks: 3

Construction
- Structure type: Ground
- Parking: Available
- Accessible: Available

Other information
- Station code: SG • 0120
- Classification: Class II

History
- Opened: 1 July 1900

Key dates
- 3 June 2020: Operated by KCI

Services
Preceding station		Following station
Walantaka towards Rangkasbitung	Merak Local	Karangantu towards Merak
Location
- Location within Java

Serang Station (Indonesian: Stasiun Serang), is a railway station located in Cimuncang, Serang, Serang, Banten on the Merak–Tanah Abang railway. The station is located to the northeast of the city center.

Previously, this station also served long-distance passenger trains and local trains such as Kalimaya, Patas Merak and Krakatau trains. As of 1 April 2017, the Kalimaya and Patas Merak trains were declared to have stopped operating because they were replaced by the new Rangkasbitung Line service of the KRL Commuterline, and on the same date, the Merak Local Train route was cut to only Rangkasbitung–Merak PP, from the previous Tanah Abang–Merak PP route. On 17 July 2017, the Krakatau train route was also cut to become Pasar Senen–Blitar PP from the previous Merak–Blitar PP, and the name was changed to Singasari train.

== History ==
Serang Station was opened on 1 July 1900, together with the completion of the railway stretch between Rangkasbitung and Serang. Serang was a terminal station for several months until 20 December 1900. On that day the line extension to Anyer Kidul was finished, thereby completing the entire Banten railway (Dutch: Bantamlijn) in order to accommodate the port of Merak as the crossing facility to Lampung.

Serang Station originally had 4 lines, but now there are only 3 lines left because the 4th line has been dismantled. In addition to the passenger station, this station was also a loading and unloading place for freight cars, where the cargo was unloaded into a warehouse located in the corner of the station embankment. In addition to warehouses, Serang Station also has a water tower facility for steam locomotives.

In the past, on the plot between Serang Station and Karangantu Station there was a Kedungcinde halt, while on the plot leading to Walantaka Station there was a Cihideung halt. These railway stops are no longer active.

== Building and layout ==
Serang Station has 3 train lines with line 2 as a straight line. There is land on the former line 4 which previously functioned as a stockpile, and line 4 is the line used for loading and unloading of goods from the carriages into the warehouse building which is in the corner of the station embankment. Right next to this former warehouse, there is also a former water tower which was used for a steam locomotive.

Given Serang's status as a provincial capital, the station has been a relatively important stop on the Banten railway. This is reflected in the more extensive facilities, such as multiple platforms and tracks. The station actually has four tracks, but the easternmost track is unusable, leaving only three tracks in use.

The front of the station building faces west. The building stands on foundations of up to 60 centimeters from the ground. The station building has two main rooms: one for the train dispatcher and station master, and another for administration and ticket sale. Between these two is the waiting area. Part of the building still retains the original Dutch architecture, such as the tall doors and windows.

== Services ==
The following is a list of train services at the Serang Station.

=== Passenger Services ===
- KAI Commuter

LM Merak Commuter Line, to Rangkasbitung and Merak

== Supporting transportation ==
Type	Route	Destination
Angkot	R03	Pakupatan–Pasar Rau–Kepandean
Angkot	R06	Cipocok–Pasar Lama–Pasar Rau
Angkot	R07	Kepandean–Pasar Lama–Pasar Rau

== Gallery ==
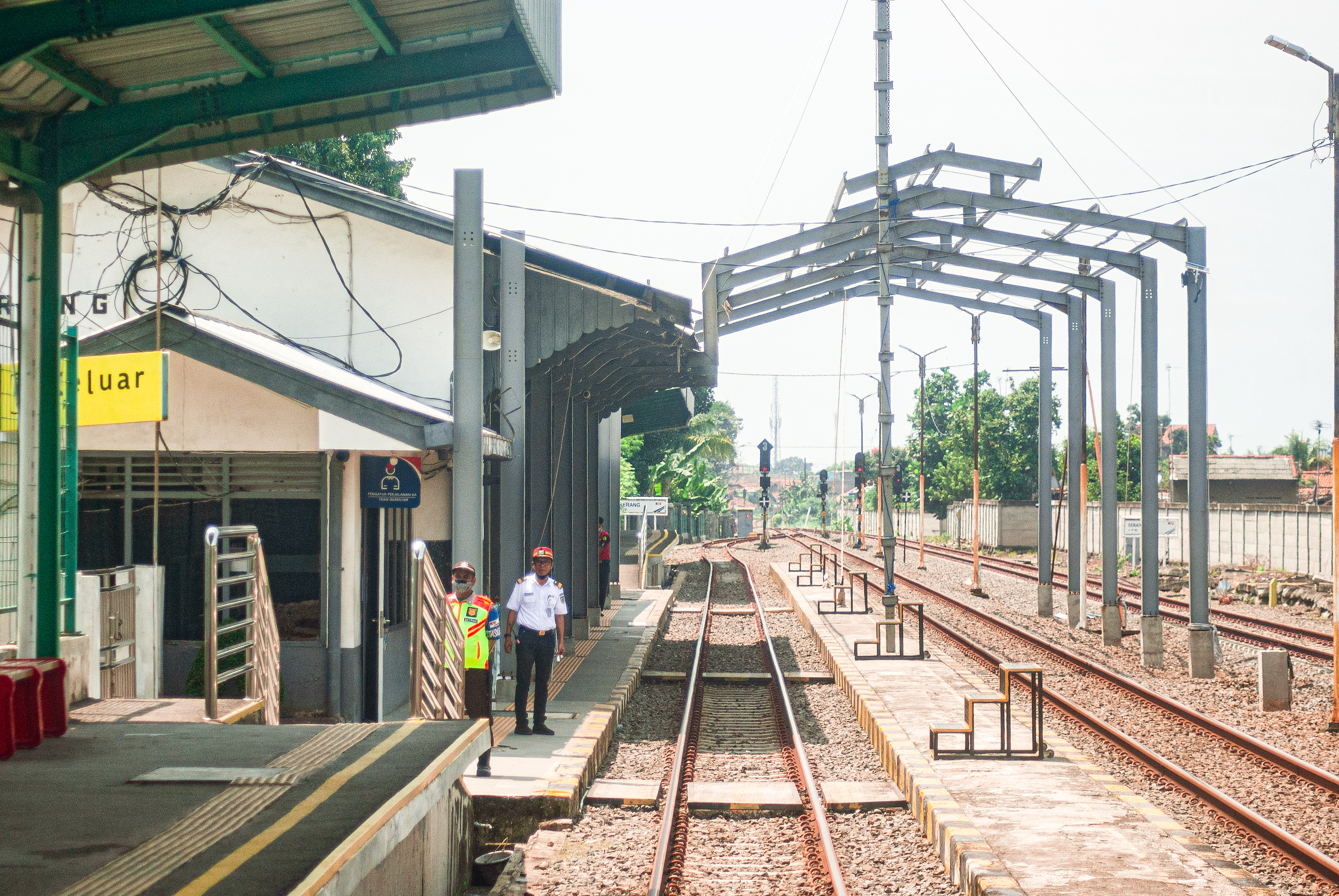
The station platform, taken on 18 March 2023

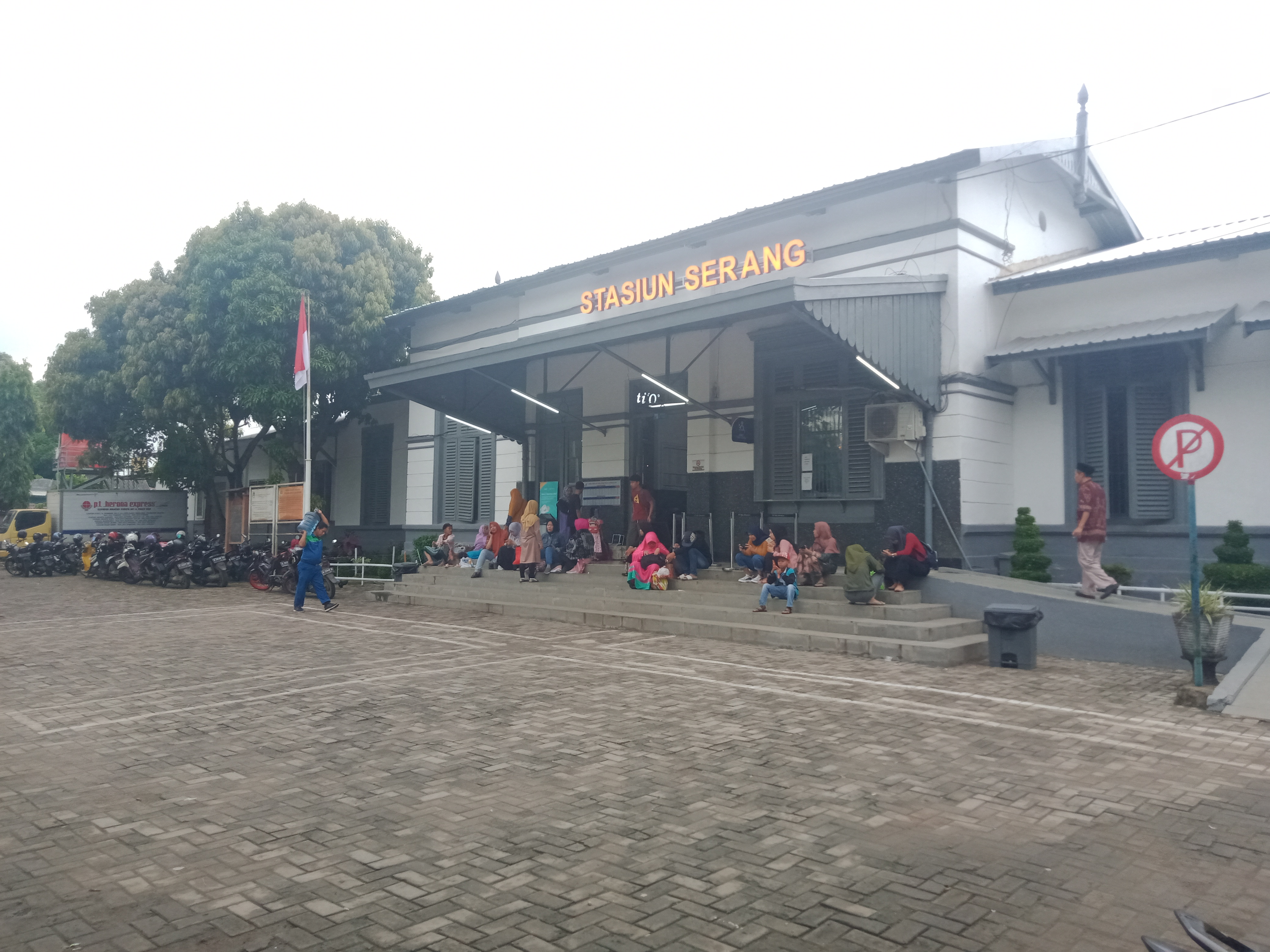
Front view of the station (2020)

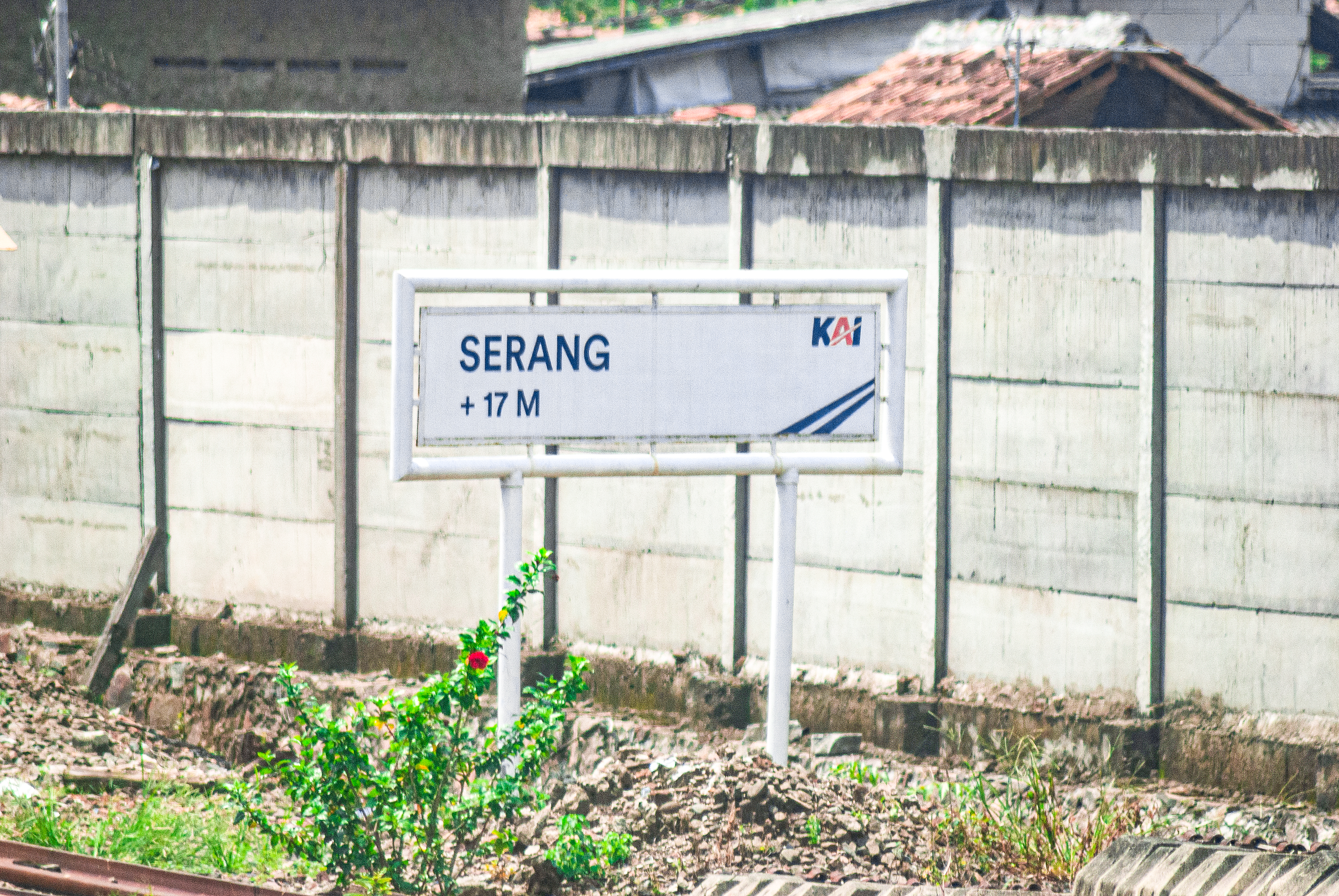
The signage of the station

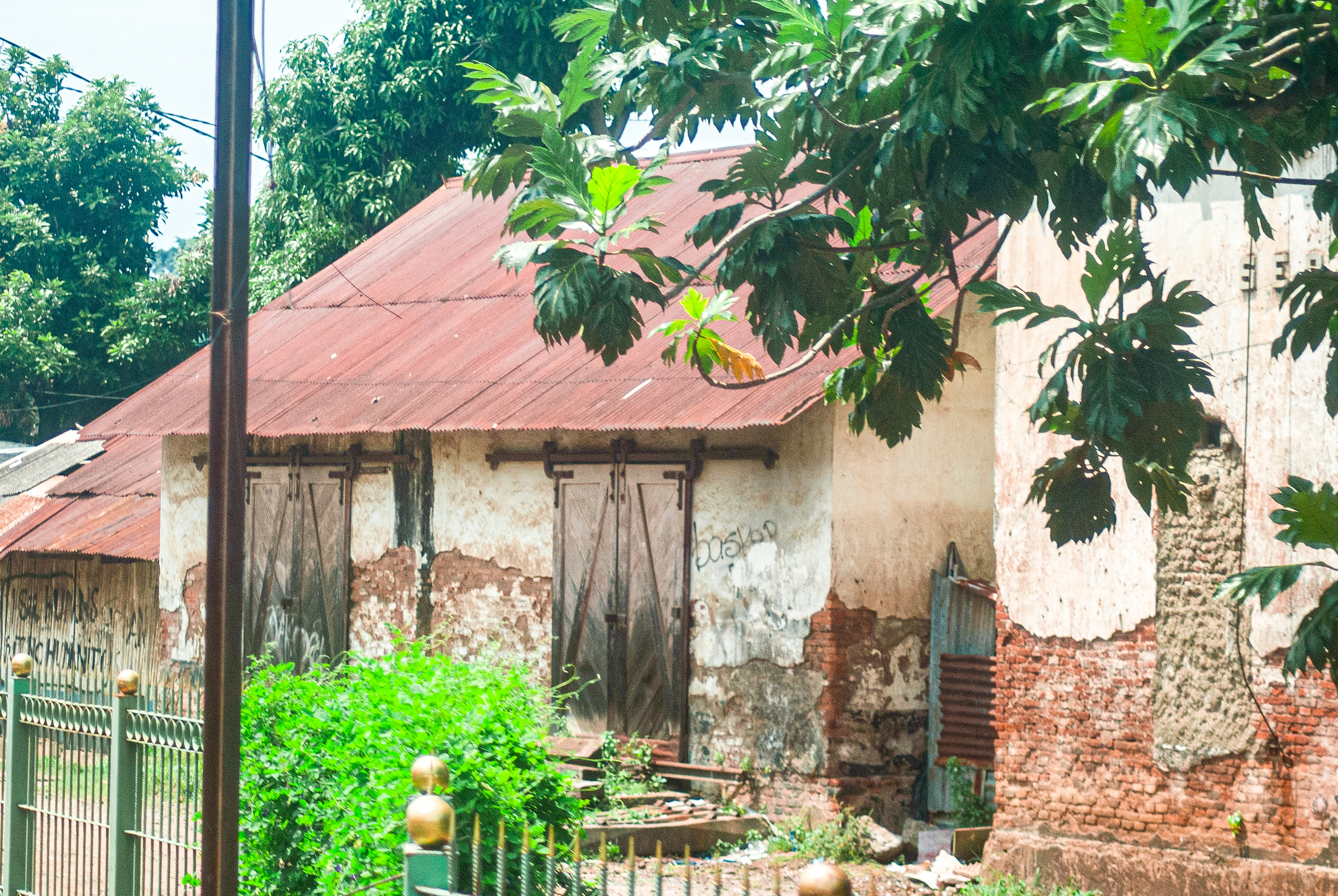
Ex-warehouse building and water tower at Serang Station

== Incidents ==
- On 8 June 2015, The pipeline freight train from Krenceng to Semarang collapsed at the crossing close to this station, there were no fatalities in this incident. As a result of this incident, a number of trains bound for Tanah Abang experienced delays and the access road was temporarily closed.
- On 26 July 2022, Lokal Merak heading to Rangkasbitung left this station and crashed into an "odong-odong" at Silebu about 5 metres from the station injuring several passengers and killing 9. The crossing gates have been added at the site where the accident occurred.

Preceding station	Kereta Api Indonesia	Following station
Karangantu towards Merak	Merak–Tanah Abang	Walantaka towards Tanah Abang
