= Merak Commuter Line =

Commuter rail service in Indonesia

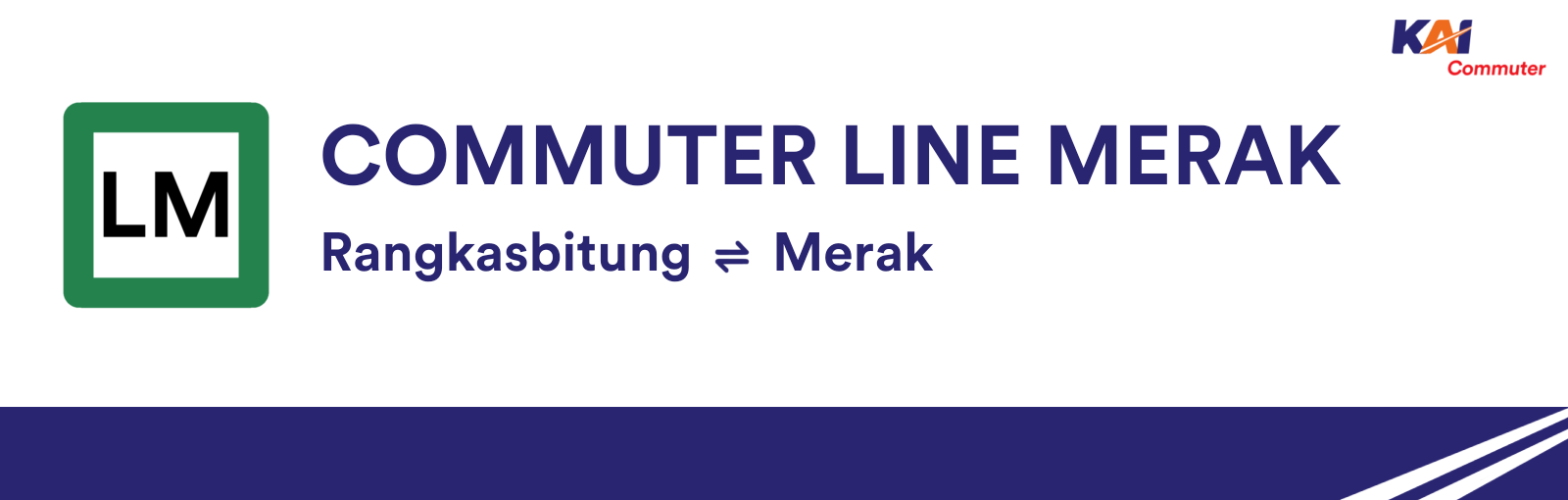

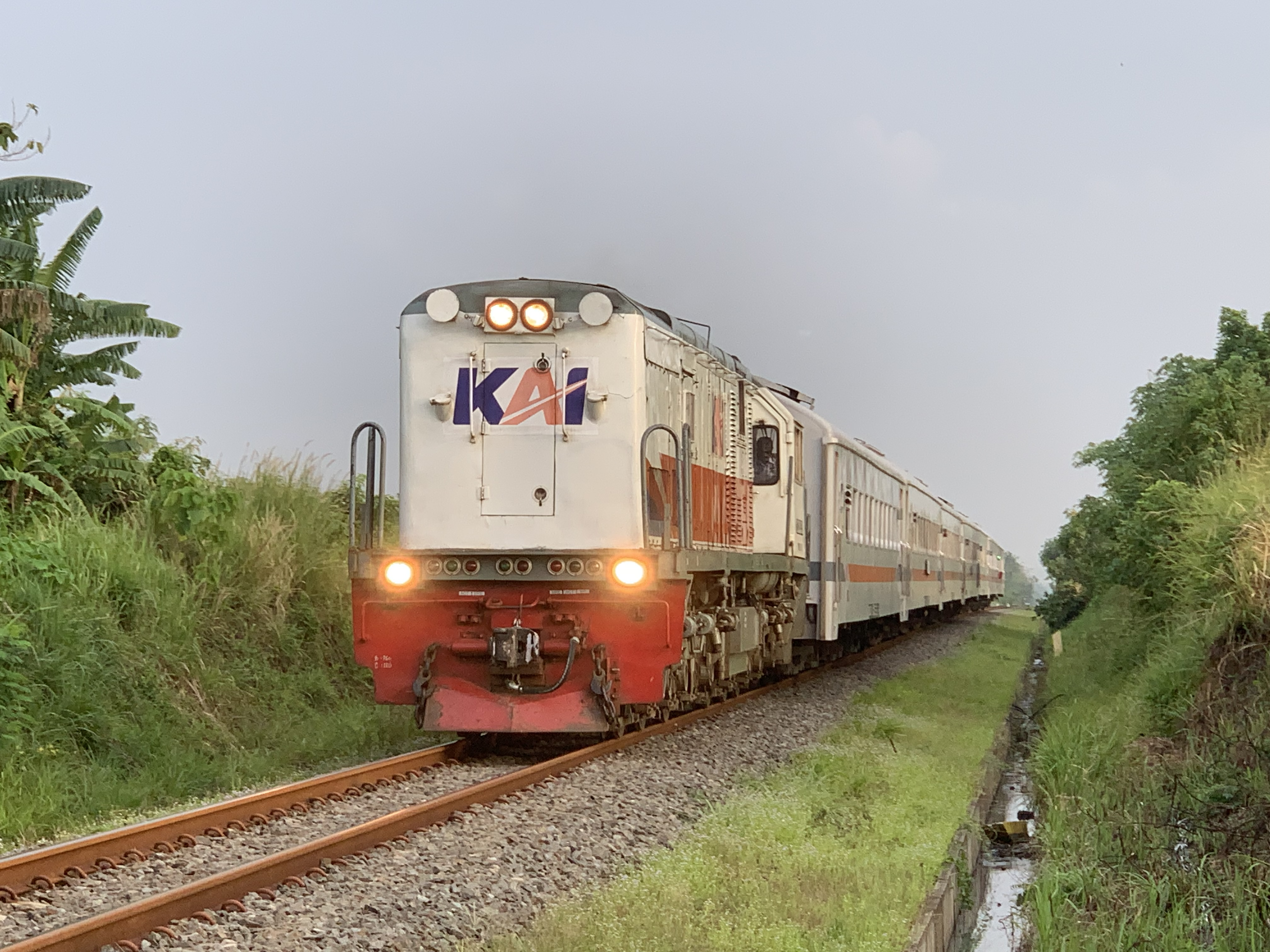
- Merak Commuter Line train passing through the railway section between Walantaka Station and Serang Station

Overview
- Other name: Merak Line
- Native name: Kereta Api Commuter Line Merak; Kereta Api Lokal Merak
- Status: Operational
- Locale: Lebak Regency; Serang Regency; Serang; Cilegon
- Termini: Rangkasbitung; Merak
- Stations: 11

Service
- Type: Commuter rail
- Operator(s): KAI Commuter
- Daily ridership: 16,675 (highest); 12,228 (average, 2025); 4.46 million (annual 2025)

History
- Opened: 1 April 2017

Technical
- Line length: 69 km (43 mi)
- Operating speed: 40–75 km/h (25–47 mph)

The Merak Commuter Line or simply Merak Line, formerly Merak Local Train (Indonesian: Kereta Api Lokal Merak), is a local commuter rail service operated by KAI Commuter that runs from Merak Station to Rangkasbitung Station in Banten, Indonesia. The service, which was reactivated on 1 April 2017, has a total travel time up to 2 hours and is a primary means of transportation for Merak residents to travel to Rangkasbitung. It is colloquially called the Dark Green Line due to its dark green ( ) coloured route on the Commuterline travel map.

Initially, train service for the Angke–Merak route operated under the name Banten Ekspres (Patas Merak). Since the enactment of the 2017 train travel chart (Gapeka) and the Rangkasbitung Line was established, Banten Ekspres was removed so that the Merak–Rangkasbitung line is only served by Merak Line.

On 1 October 2020, the Merak Local train operation, which was previously managed by Kereta Api Indonesia, was moved to its subsidiary KAI Commuter after obtaining an operating license from the Ministry of Transportation on 3 June 2020.

On 1 June 2023, the Ministry of Transportation, via the 2023 Train Travel Chart (Gapeka), renamed the route from Merak Local Train to the Merak Commuter Line.

== Fare ==
KAI stipulates that the Merak Line fare is Rp 3,000.00 for all passenger mileage. Merak Line tickets can be purchased using the Access by KAI app.

== Stations ==
Stations		Transfer/Notes	Location
Code	Name	Transfer/Notes	Location
LM01 R22	Rangkasbitung	Terminal station. Rangkasbitung Line Mandala Bus Terminal Pandeglang Regency Angkot Lebak Regency Angkot	Lebak Regency
LM02	Jambu Baru		Serang Regency
LM03	Catang		Serang Regency
LM04	Cikeusal	Serang Regency Angkot	Serang Regency
LM05	Walantaka	Serang Regency Angkot	Serang Regency
LM06	Serang	Serang city Angkot Serang Regency Angkot	Serang
LM07	Karangantu	Serang city Angkot Serang Regency Angkot	Serang
LM08	Tonjong Baru		Serang Regency
LM09	Cilegon	Cilegon Angkot Serang city Angkot Serang Regency Angkot	Cilegon
LM10	Krenceng	Cilegon Angkot Serang Regency Angkot	Cilegon
LM11	Merak	Terminal station. Port of Merak Merak Bus Terminal Cilegon Angkot	Cilegon

== Incidents ==
- On 24 December 2020 at 13:30, train numbered 490 bound for Merak Station collided with an open-loaded pickup truck at an ungated level crossing in the Jambu Baru–Catang section of the line. This incident resulted in the truck driver's death.
- On Sunday, 14 February 2021 at 07:30, another train bound for Rangkasbitung, which had just departed from Merak Station, hit a Pulomerak resident in the Bumi Waras neighborhood of Merak. The victim was dragged as far as 10 meters and suffered serious head and leg injuries and died on the scene.
- On 18 March 2021, a same train bound for Merak collided with a car at the Kadipaten gate level crossing in Cilegon at around 11:00. There were no casualties in the incident; however, two passengers and the driver were taken to the Krakatau Medika Hospital for treatment.
- On 26 July 2022 at around 11:00, a same train bound for Rangkasbitung collided with an "odong-odong" on an ungated level crossing in Silebu, Kragilan, Serang. The vehicle was carrying 34 passengers, 9 of whom died on the crash site while the driver and 24 others were injured.
