= 2022 Serang train crash =

Train crash in Indonesia

- Location of the derailment

Details
- Date: July 26, 2022, 3 years ago Around 11:00 am
- Location: Silebu, Kragilan, Serang, Banten
- Country: Indonesia
- Line: Merak–Rangkasbitung railway
- Operator: Kereta Api Indonesia
- Incident type: Collision with an odong-odong
- Cause: Human error

Statistics
- Deaths: 9
- Injured: 24

A train crash occurred on July 26, 2022 when a Kereta Api Indonesia (KAI) Lokal Merak train crashed into an odong-odong (a vehicle resembling a bus that carries people, most often children, for amusement purposes) at a level crossing in Serang, Banten, Indonesia on Tuesday morning, causing at least one odong-odong to be overturned. At least nine people were killed, including three children, and another 24 were wounded in the crash.

This was also the first fatal crash involving a train colliding with an odong-odong in history.

== Collision ==
A KAI Lokal Merak passenger train heading to Rangkasbitung collided with an odong-odong that was obstructing a level crossing from Walantaka to Kragilan at Silebu, Serang, Indonesia. It was reported that the odong-odong had more than 20 people aboard while intentionally obstructing the level crossing. The collision caused extensive damage to the rear of the odong-odong.

Nine people were killed, including three children, and 24 people were injured.

== Investigation ==
The driver was charged with negligent homicide and causing actual bodily harm by negligence, which carries a penalty of six to 12 years in prison.

Investigators determined that the cause of the crash was the driver's carelessness. It was also confirmed that the odong-odong was banned from any public roads due to safety reasons.

== Aftermath ==
The tragedy was one of a series of multiple-casualty incidents on Indonesia's overcrowded and poorly maintained railway system. The director of KAI commented that no gate was installed at the crossing due to the low frequency of trains on the route, while assuring that it would look into the matter.

Prior to this incident, residents had improved the crossing by adding only crossing gates.
