= Merak railway station =

Railway station in Indonesia

LM11 Merak Station Stasiun Merak
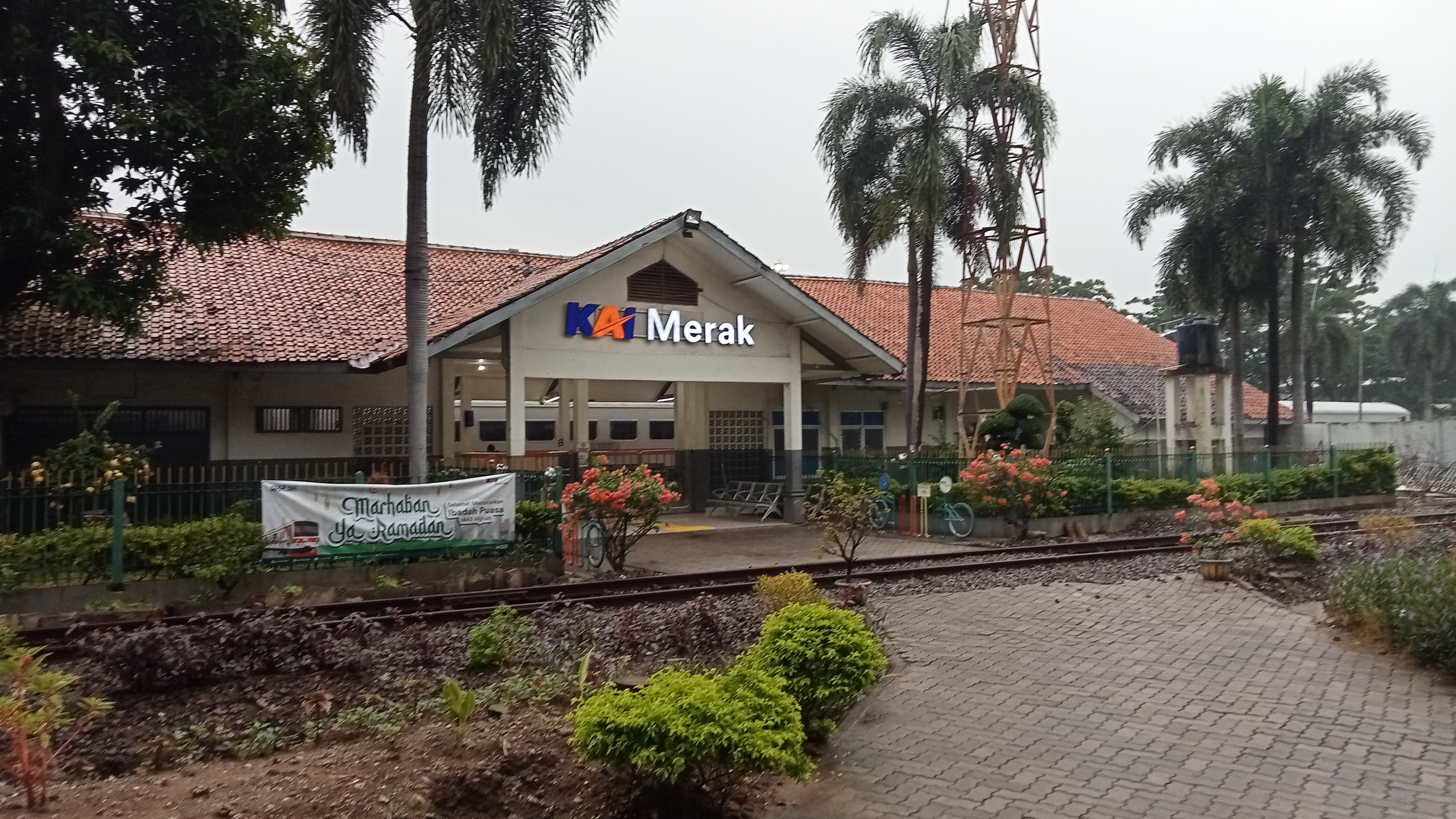
- Front building of Merak Station in 2022

General information
- Location: Port of Merak complex, Pulomerak, Cilegon, Banten 42438, Indonesia
- Coordinates: 5.930185°S 105.996779°E
- Elevation: +3m
- Owner: Kereta Api Indonesia
- Manager: Kereta Api Indonesia; KAI Commuter
- Lines: LM Merak Commuter Line; Krenceng–Merak
- Platforms: Three side platforms
- Tracks: 3

Construction
- Cycle facilities: Bicycle parking
- Accessible: Yes

Other information
- Station code: MER • 0101
- Classification: Class II

History
- Opened: 1 December 1914
- Original company: Staatsspoorwegen

Services
Preceding station		Following station
Krenceng towards Rangkasbitung	Merak Local	Terminus
Location

Merak Station (MER) is a class II railway station located in Tamansari, Pulomerak, Cilegon, Banten. The station is located at an altitude of +3 meters and is the westernmost active railway station in Operation Area I Jakarta, as well as in Java. The station is located inside Port of Merak complex. Since 2017, the station only serves Merak Local trains to Rangkasbitung.

== History ==
The construction of the railway line from Rangkasbitung was continued by Staatsspoorwegen to Serang area on 1 July 1900, which was then extended to Anyer Kidul Harbor on 1 December 1900. A branch line to Merak was opened on 1 December 1914 to accommodate the Port of Merak, which is closer for crossing to Lampung than Anyer Kidul. Merak Station is one of the three westernmost terminus stations on Java Island besides Anyer Kidul and Labuan.

The current station building was constructed in the 1990s, with the original Staatsspoorwegen-built building were demolished at the same time to make way for the construction of ferry crossing terminal. The office of ASDP Merak seaport now stands at the site of the old station. The station also had a branch line to Indah Kiat Port for paper pulp trains, with the line inactive since the 1990s.

Merak Station used to serve long-distance passenger trains and local trains such as Krakatau intercity and Kalimaya express local trains. Kalimaya was discontinued on 1 April 2017 as it was replaced by the Rangkasbitung Commuter Line service, while Krakatau was discontinued on 17 July 2017.

== Building and layout ==
The station has three active lines. Line 1 is used as shunting line for locomotives, with line 2 used for loading and unloading of passengers and line 3 was used for passenger cars storage or stabling in the past. While still active, currently line 3 is mostly unused. There is also the inactive line 4, with its connection to the main line severed and mostly buried with asphalt. There is an abandoned hopper wagon in former line 4.

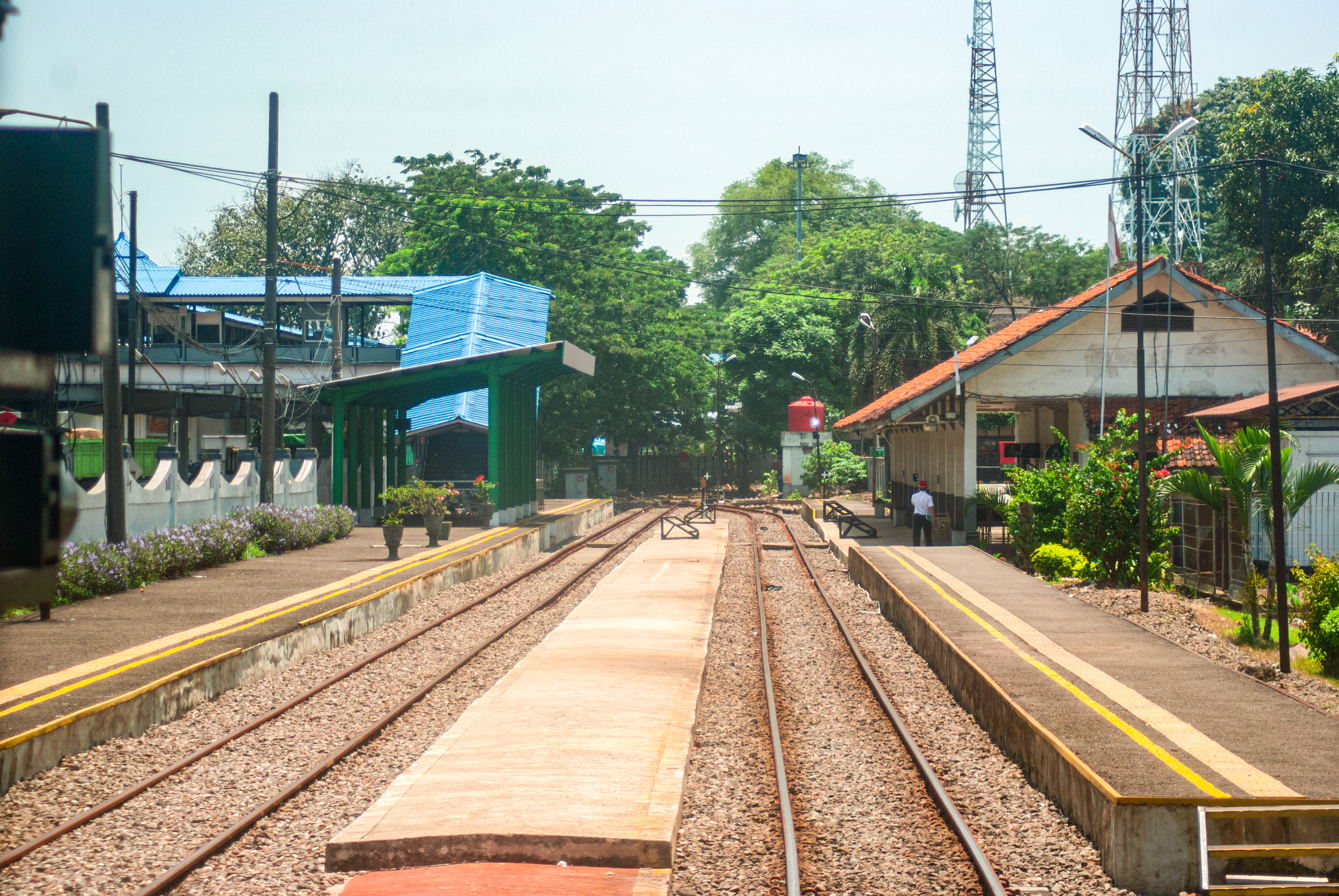
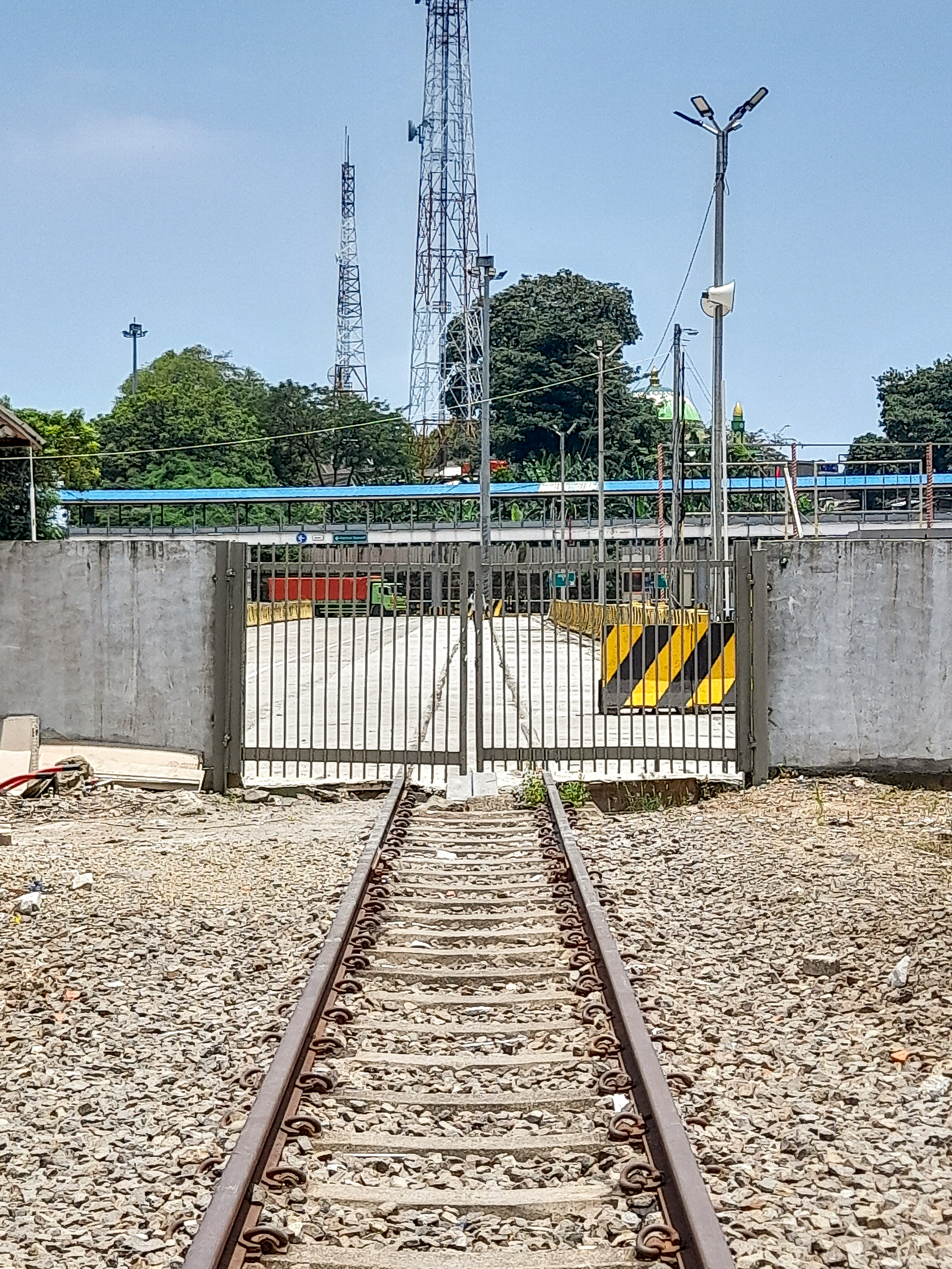
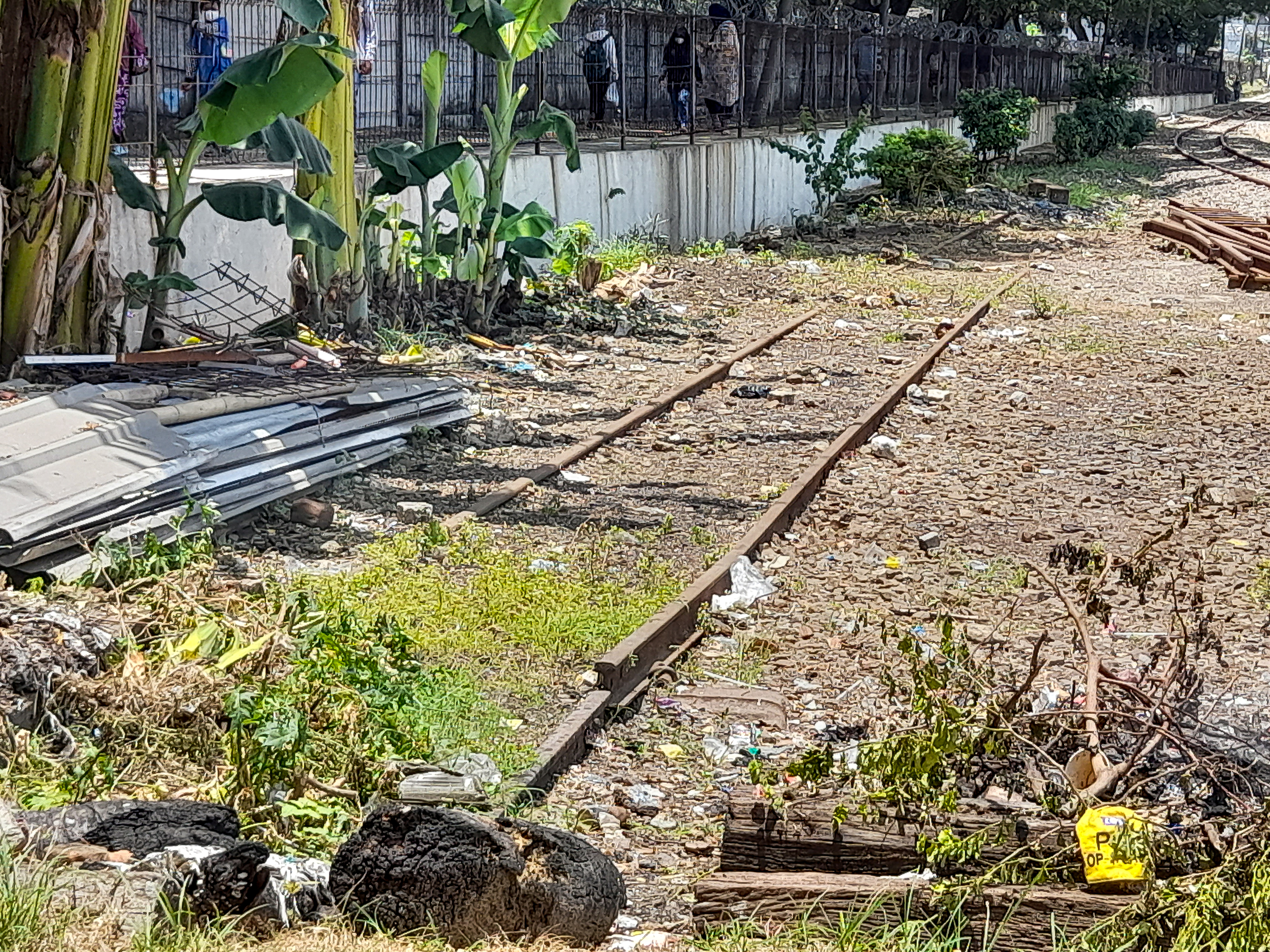
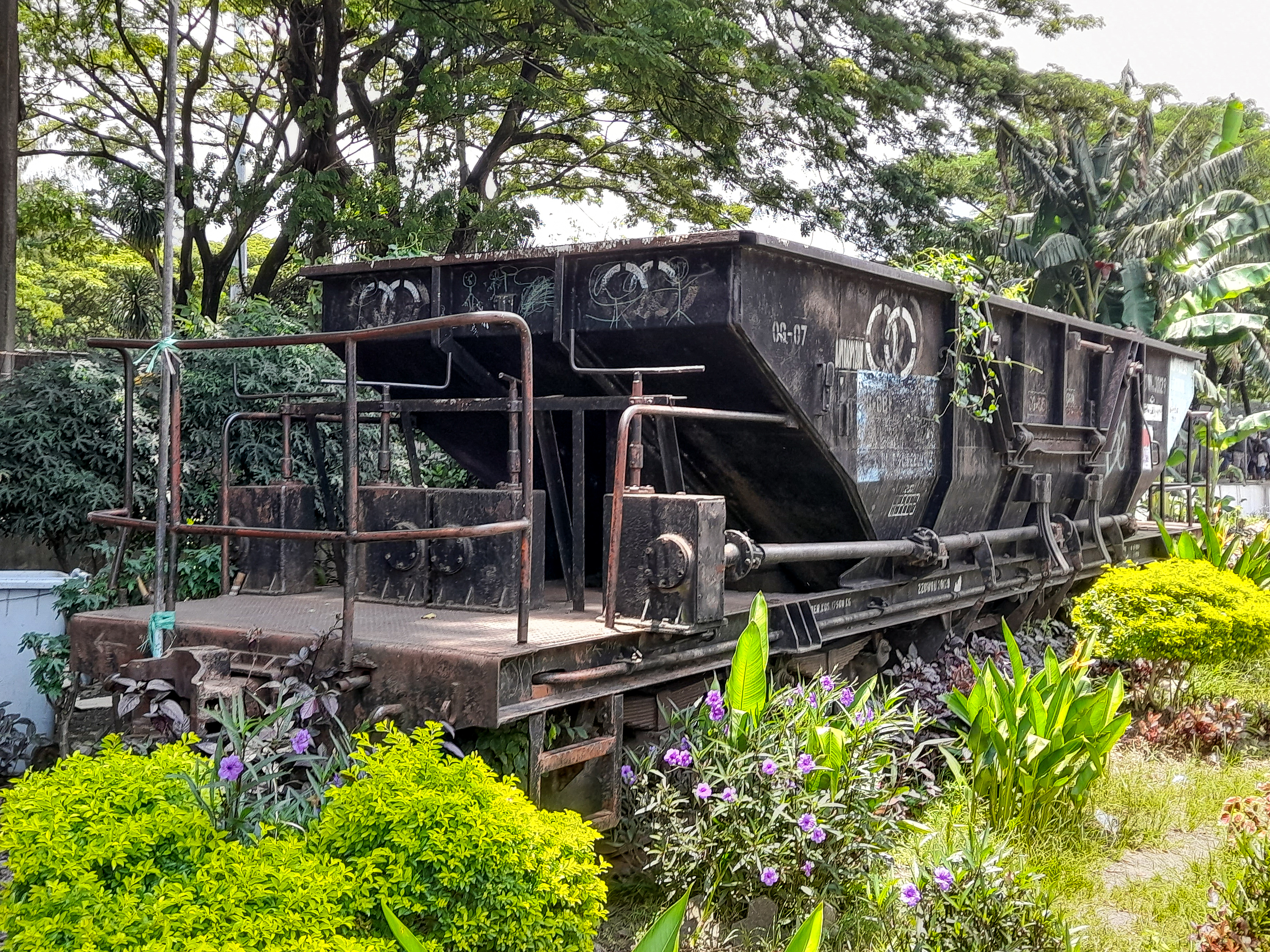
(From left to right) Line 1 and 2; Gated and unused line 3; severed line 4 with derelict hopper wagon

Merak Station is located inside Port of Merak, which is owned by ASDP Indonesia Ferry. In order to board the ferry service, visitors have to pay the seaport entrance fee of 2,500 rupiah.

Representative from Kereta Api Indonesia's Operation Area I Jakarta has said that the Merak Station would be relocated to a new location in the future.

== Services ==
=== Passenger services ===
- Local economy class
  - Merak Commuter Line, towards Rangkasbitung

Defunct services

- Kalimaya express local (Merak–Tanah Abang)
- Patas Merak rapid local (Merak–Tanah Abang)
  (Now called Lokal Merak with shortened route from Merak to Rangkasbitung)
- Krakatau intercity (Merak–Kediri via Tanah Abang)

== Incidents ==
- 28 September 1980, the BB303 15 locomotive crashed into a buffer stop and almost fell into the sea because it was traveling at too high a speed when it wanted to rotate the locomotive's position on the turntable. At that time the location of Merak Station was still in the coastal area.

== Gallery ==
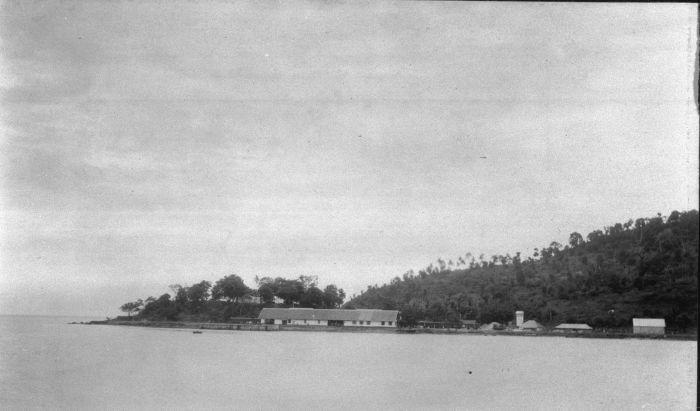
The Merak Station in 1921

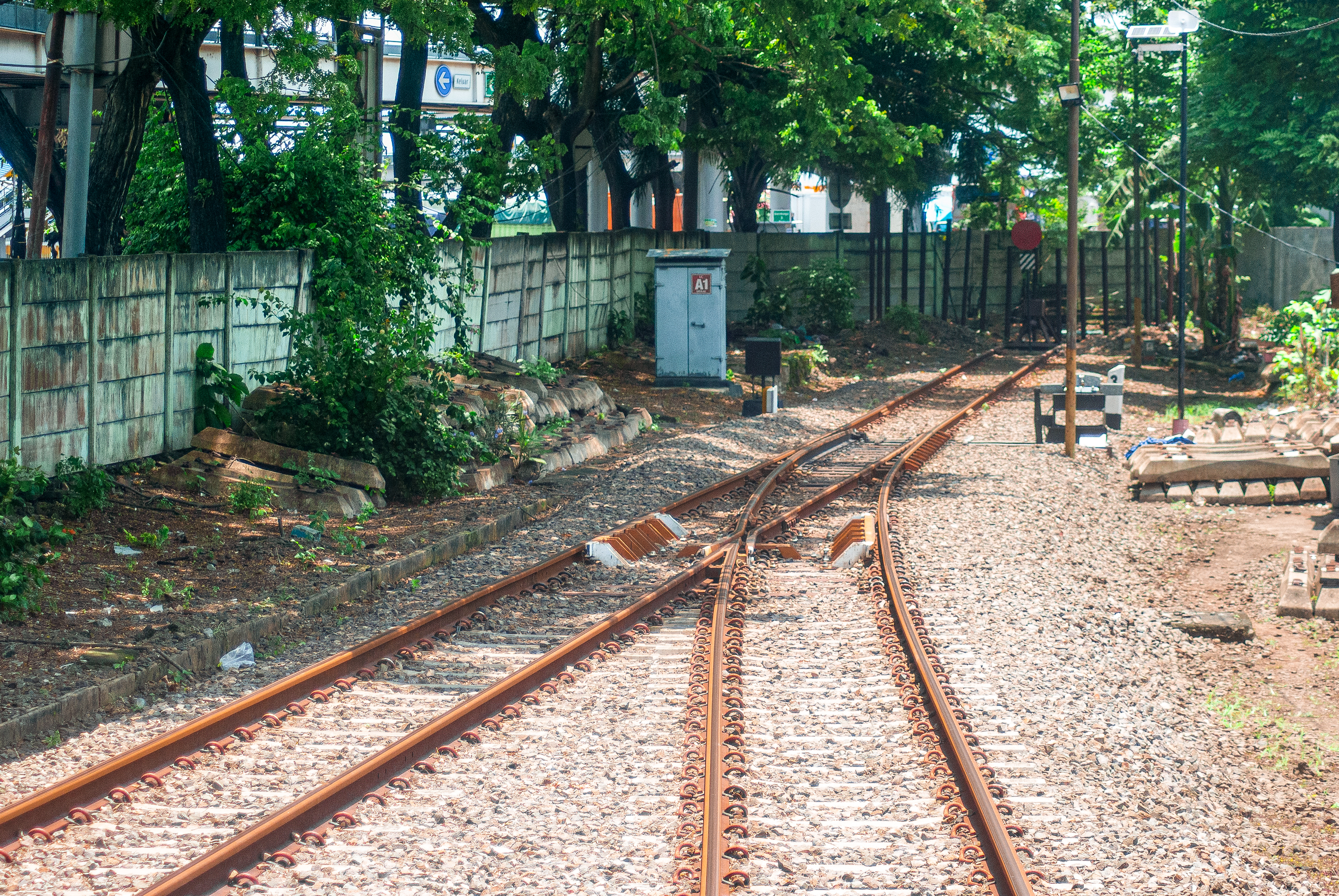
A railroad switch at the end of the Merak Station emplacement which is used for locomotive shunting

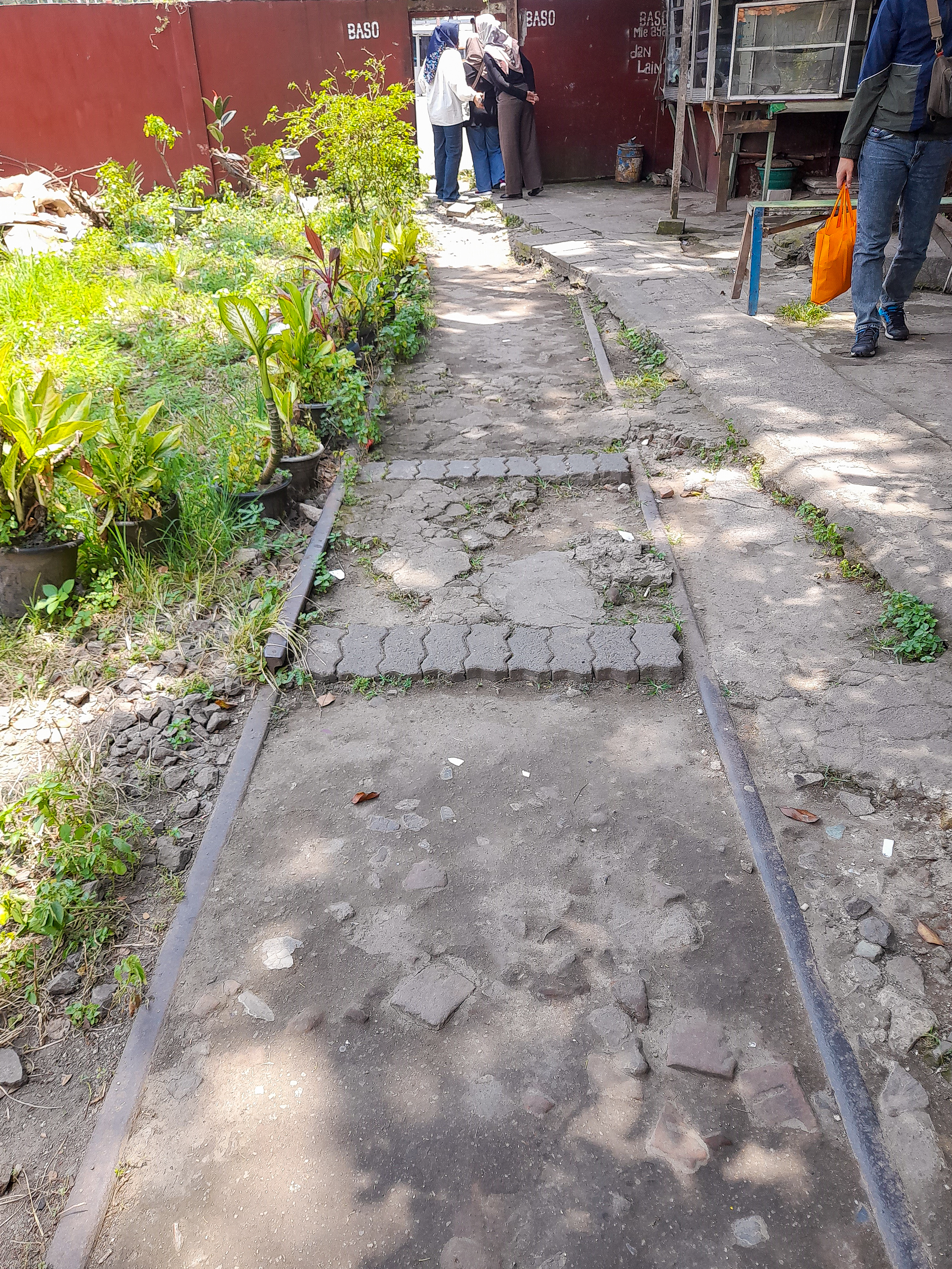
The remaining of line 4 which has been disconnected with the main line

Preceding station	Kereta Api Indonesia	Following station
Terminus	Merak–Tanah Abang	Krenceng towards Tanah Abang
