= Rangkasbitung railway station =

Railway station in Indonesia

R22 LM01 Rangkasbitung Station Stasiun Rangkasbitung
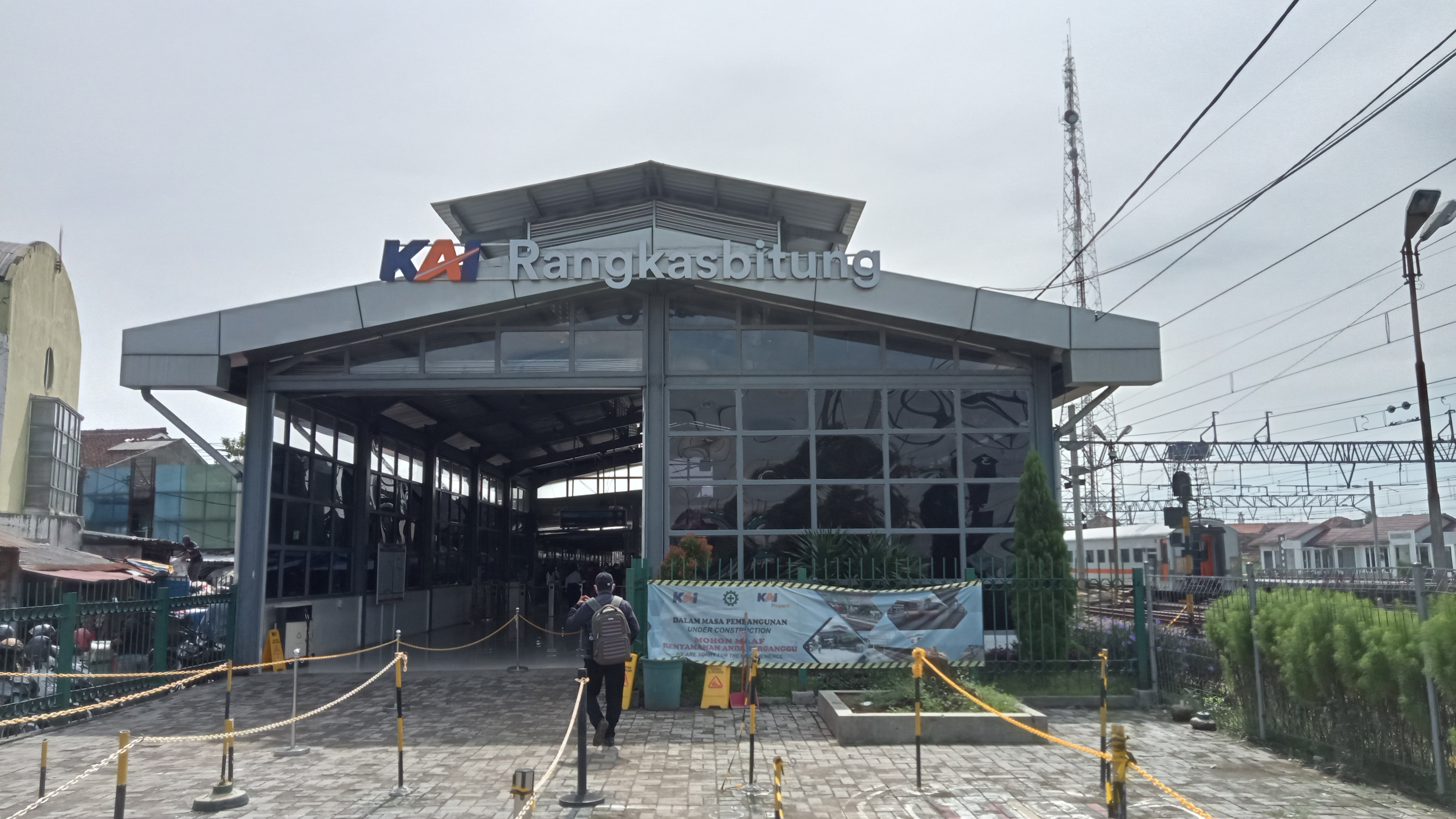
- The new entrance hall of Rangkasbitung station (2021)

General information
- Location: Jl. Stasiun Rangkasbitung No.1, East Muara Ciujung, Rangkasbitung, Lebak Regency; Banten; Indonesia
- Coordinates: 6.35266°S 106.25152999999999°E
- Elevation: +22 m (72 ft)
- Owner: Kereta Api Indonesia
- Operator: KAI Commuter
- Lines: Rangkasbitung Line; LM Merak Commuter Line; Merak–Tanah Abang
- Platforms: 1 side platform 2 island platforms
- Tracks: 8

Construction
- Structure type: Ground
- Parking: Available
- Accessible: Available

Other information
- Station code: RK• 0130 • RANGKAS
- Classification: Large type A

History
- Opened: 1 October 1899
- Electrified: 2017
- Former names: Rangkasbetoeng Station

Services
Preceding station		Following station
Citeras towards Tanah Abang	Rangkasbitung Commuter Line	Terminus
Terminus	Merak Local	Jambu Baru towards Merak
Location
- Location within Java

Rangkasbitung Station (RK) is a railway station located in East Muara Ciujung, Rangkasbitung, Lebak Regency, Banten. It is the main station of Lebak Regency. This station has a small rail yard to keep passenger coaches and goods carriages. This yard also keeps locomotives from Jakarta, which serve trains from Jakarta Kota. All train services that pass this station stop at this station.

Since 1 April 2017, KRL Commuterline has commenced operations from Tanah Abang Station to Rangkasbitung, formerly terminating at Maja Station. Therefore, local services such as Kalimaya, Langsam and Rangkas Jaya, which terminate at Angke and Tanah Abang Station, have stopped operations.

Starting on 3 November 2020, the elimination of single-trip card (Tiket Harian Berjaminan or THB card) sales was carried out at this station in stages to reduce passenger contact in anticipation of the transmission of COVID-19. However, passengers can still tap in/tap out with THB cards at the station. In 2022, the renovation and expansion of Rangkasbitung Station commenced construction. It will add a second floor for concourse and easy access to KRL Rangkasbitung Line and Merak Commuter Line platforms, as well as to anticipate the climbing number of passengers.

== History ==
The station was built together with the Tanah Abang–Rangkasbitung railway in the late 19th century. In the past, there was a branch for the railroad line to Labuan via Pandeglang, which has been inactive since 1984. On this line there is another branch for the line at Saketi to Bayah; it was built by Japanese war prisoners and conscripted workers better known as romusha during the Japanese occupation during World War II. Thousands of people died because of the inhuman treatment of the Japanese soldiers. Branch lines are included in the reactivation master plan.

The electrification and the double-track construction on the Maja–Rangkasbitung section was commenced in 2015 to support the KRL Green Line extension to Rangkasbitung. Eventually, on 1 April 2017, the KRL Green Line was officially extended to Rangkasbitung; since then, the line is better known as the Rangkasbitung Line. In 2022, the first phase of the extension of Rangkasbitung Station begun, focused on adding new track lines. The second phase is ongoing, constructing a new large building over the emplacement. The expansion will increase the capacity up to 83,000 daily passengers. It is expected that Rangkasbitung Station will be one of the main hubs of train services in Banten.

== Building and layout ==
This station has eight lines. Initially, line 1 was a straight line. After the Maja–Rangkasbitung double track was officially operated in line with the enactment of the 2019 train travel chart on 1 December 2019, line 1 is now only used as a double track straight line from the direction of Jakarta, while line 2 is used as a double track straight line towards Jakarta as well as a double track and single track from and towards Merak.

At this station, there is also a train depot and a locomotive depot, which store and maintain the flat carriages used for the Babarandek and Baja Coil trains as well as the Merak Commuter Line series and the locomotives that are given the task of pulling them. There is also a KRL depot, which was built together with the construction of the double track.

The old station building, which was a legacy of the Staatsspoorwegen, has now been designated as a cultural heritage by Center for Preservation and Architectural Design Unit of Kereta Api Indonesia. Currently, on the west side of the old building, there is a new building in the form of a waiting room, which is reserved for KRL passengers only, while the old building is used as a dedicated waiting room for Merak Commuter Line passengers.

The following is the track layout table of Rangkasbitung Station, as of 1 August 2025:

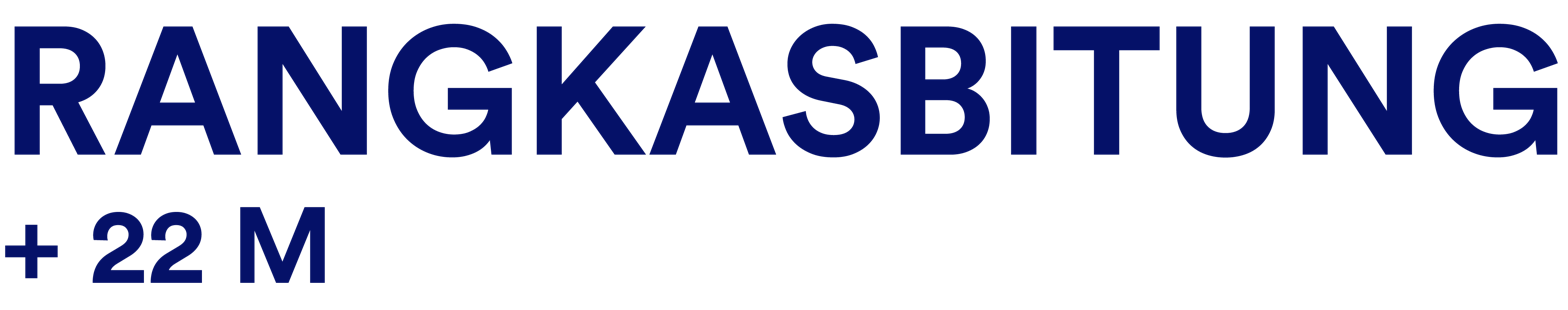
R22 LM01
G	Main building
P Platform floor	Side platform
P Platform floor	Line 1	←Jambu Baru	LM Merak Commuter Line, from and towards Merak
P Platform floor	Island platform
P Platform floor	Line 2		Straight tracks towards Tanah Abang or Merak
P Platform floor	Line 2	←Jambu Baru	LM Merak Commuter Line, from and towards Merak
P Platform floor	Island platform
P Platform floor	Line 3	Temporarily inactive turning tracks
P Platform floor	Line 4	Temporarily inactive turning tracks
P Platform floor	Island platform
P Platform floor	Line 5		Rangkasbitung Line from and towards Tanah Abang	(Citeras) →
P Platform floor	Island platform
P Platform floor	Line 7		Rangkasbitung Line from and towards Tanah Abang	(Citeras) →
P Platform floor	Line 8		Train parking
P Platform floor	Line 9		Train parking

== Services ==
The following is a list of train services at the Rangkasbitung Station:

=== Passenger services ===
- Local economy class
  - Merak Commuter Line, towards Merak
- KRL Commuterline
  - Green Line, towards Tanah Abang (Rangkasbitung branch)

Defunct services

- Kalimaya express local (Merak–Tanah Abang)
- Langsam local (Rangkasbitung–Angke)
- Rangkas Jaya express local (Rangkasbitung–Tanah Abang)
- Patas Merak rapid local (Merak–Tanah Abang (succeeded by the Merak Commuter Line, with shortened route from Merak to Rangkasbitung)
- Krakatau intercity (Merak–Kediri via Tanah Abang)

== Incidents ==
- On 25 October 2001, around 02:40 local time, a passenger train numbered 930 serving the Jakarta Kota–Rangkasbitung route collide with a coal transport train numbered 2123 serving the Cigading–Bekasi route around 800 metres (870 yd) west of the station (bound for Jambu Baru Station). Train numbered 930 suffered brake failure, so the train could not stop and continued moving towards Rangkasbitung emplacement and collied another train (numbered 2123) stopped on the Rangkasbitung entrance signal on the Jambu Baru side.
- On 11 October 2010 around 01:45, some carriages of passenger trains that parked at the emplacement were burned by a group of unidentified people. There were at least 17 economy class carriages were burned out. After arriving at Rangkasbitung, the carriages were washed at 23:00 to be used in the next day. However, a fire sparked around 01:45, and it was extinguished around 03:00. Thus, passenger train service numbered 901 bound for Pasar Senen had to be cancelled.

== Gallery ==
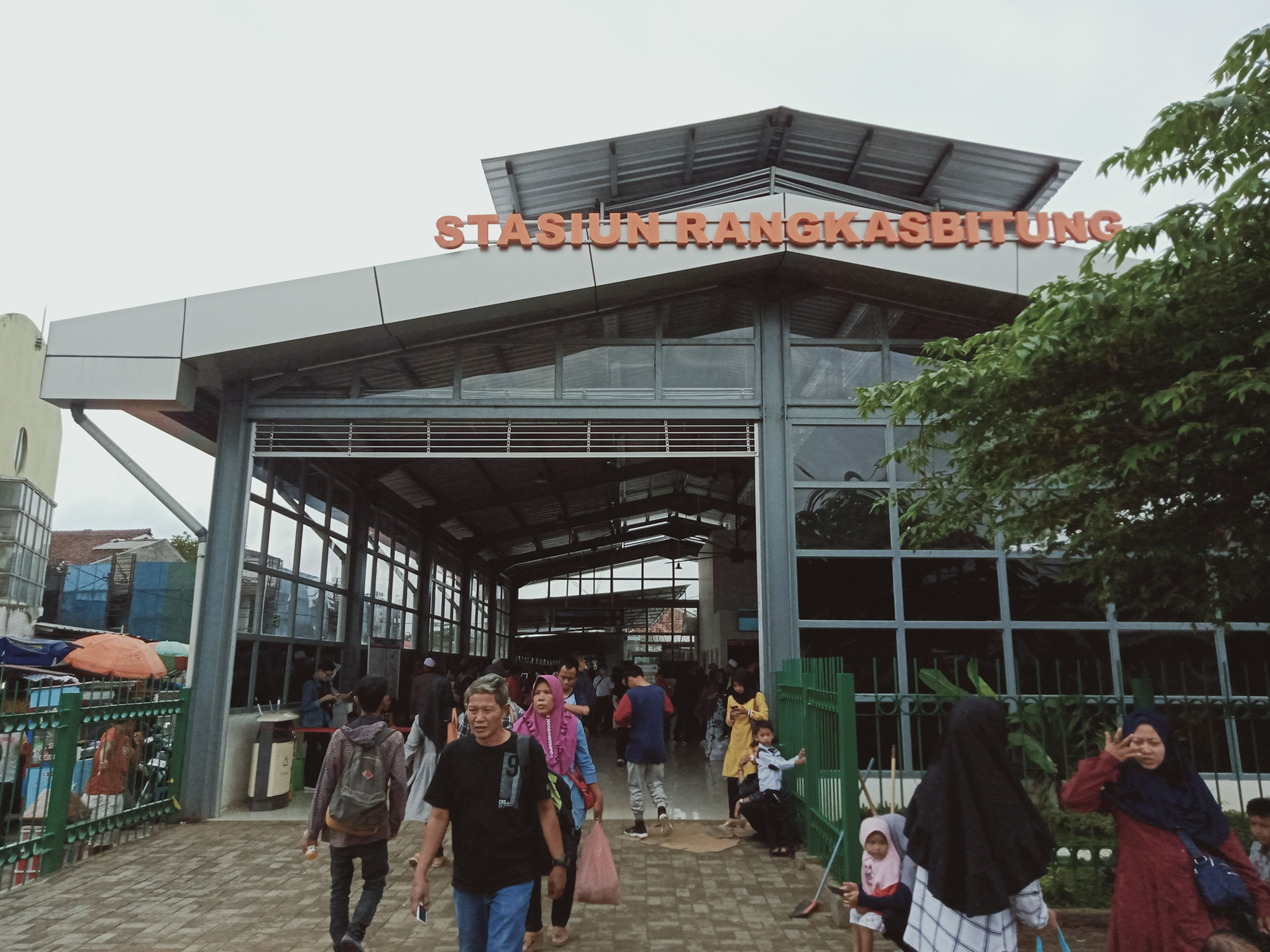
The new hall of Rangkasbitung station, 2020

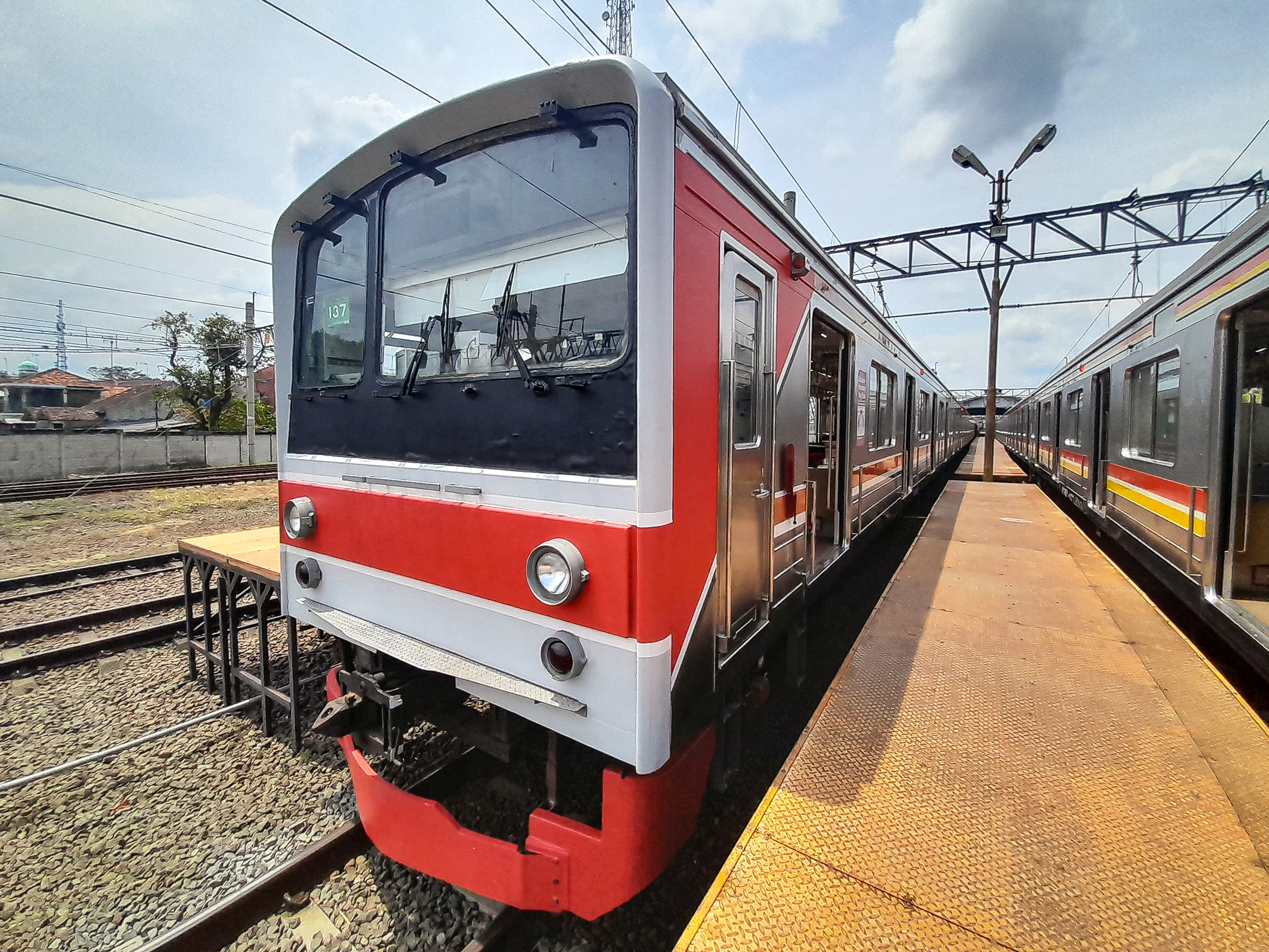
KRL Commuterline train at Rangkasbitung, 2022

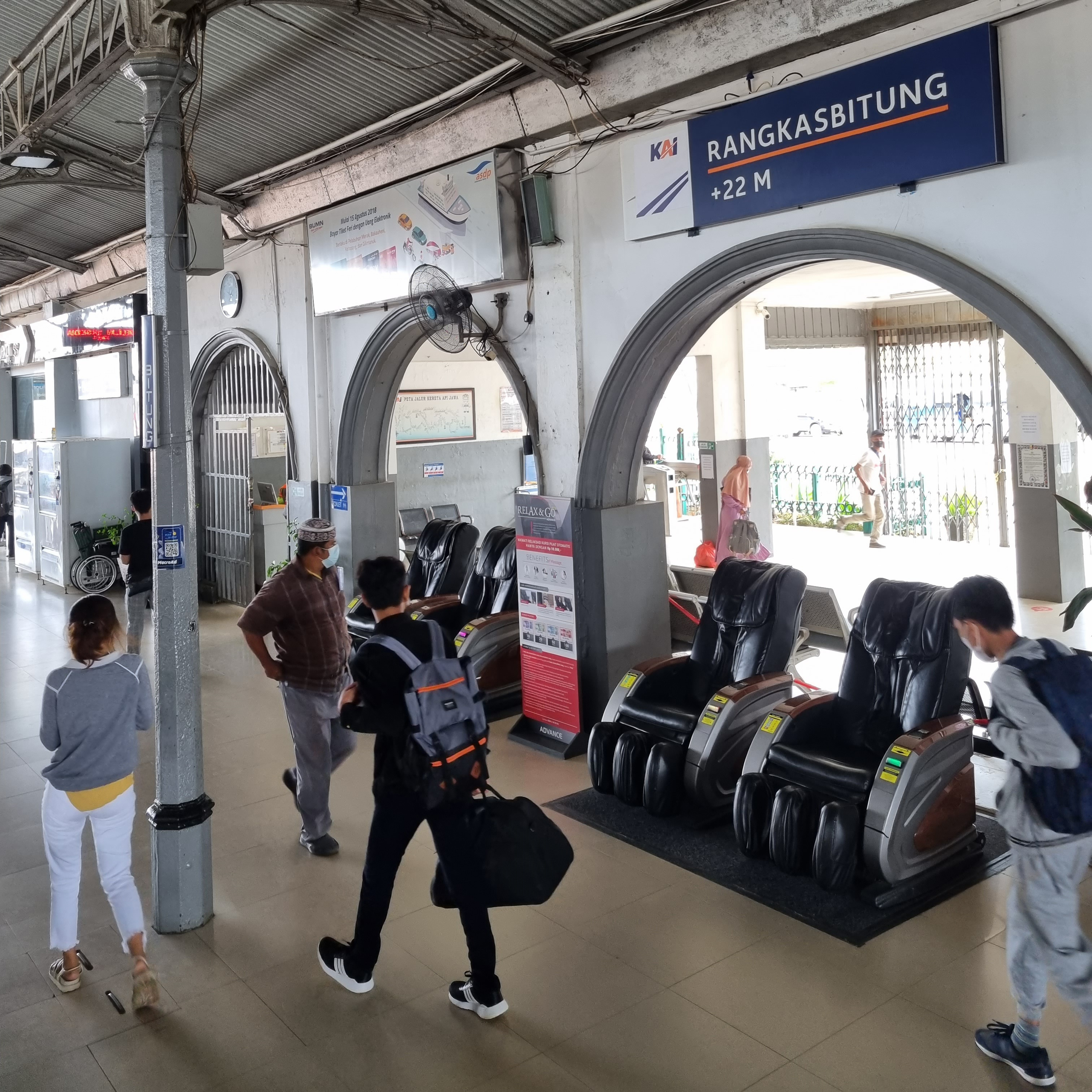
The atmosphere inside the station, with massage chair services, 2022

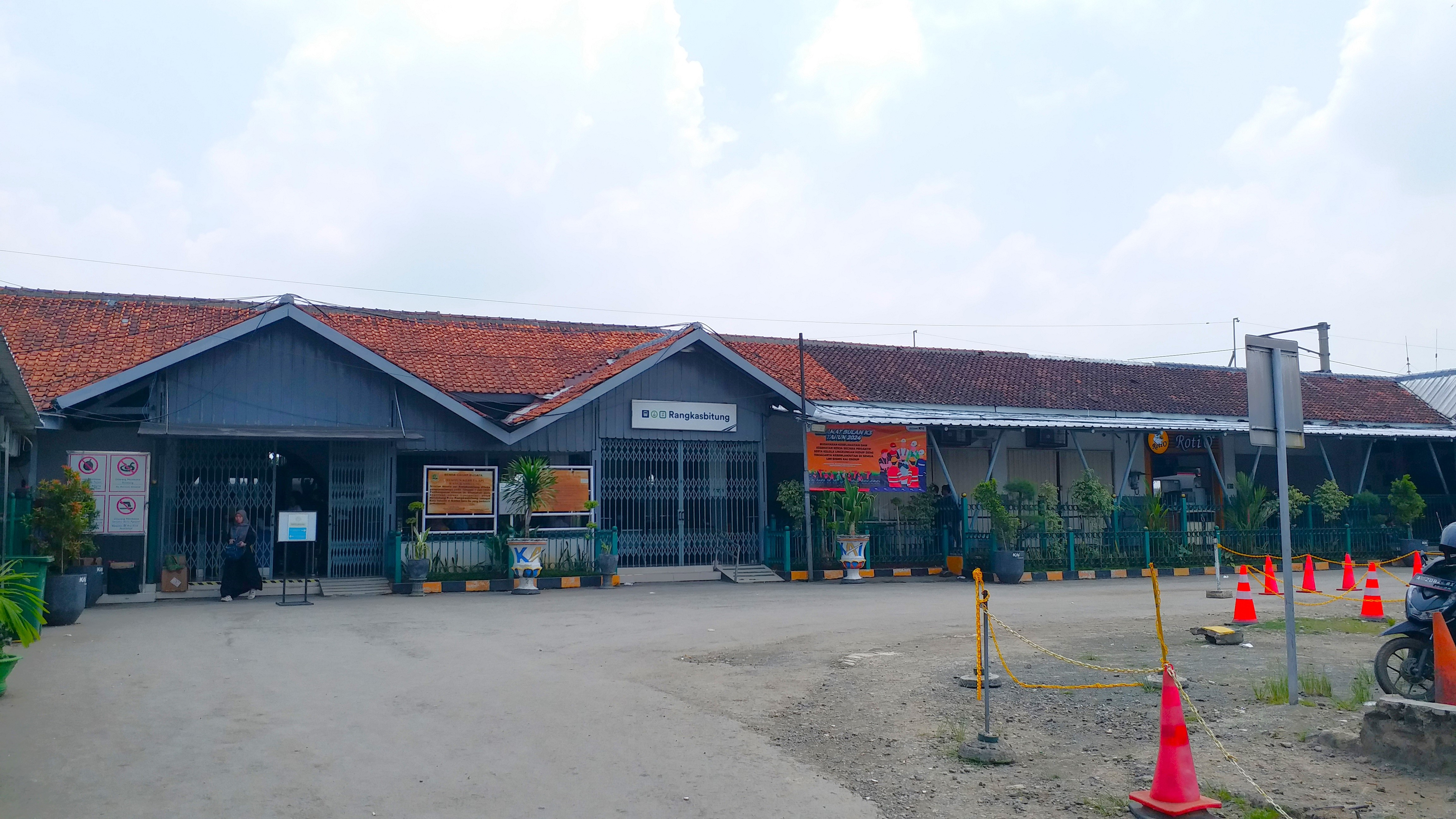
Front view of the heritage building, 2024

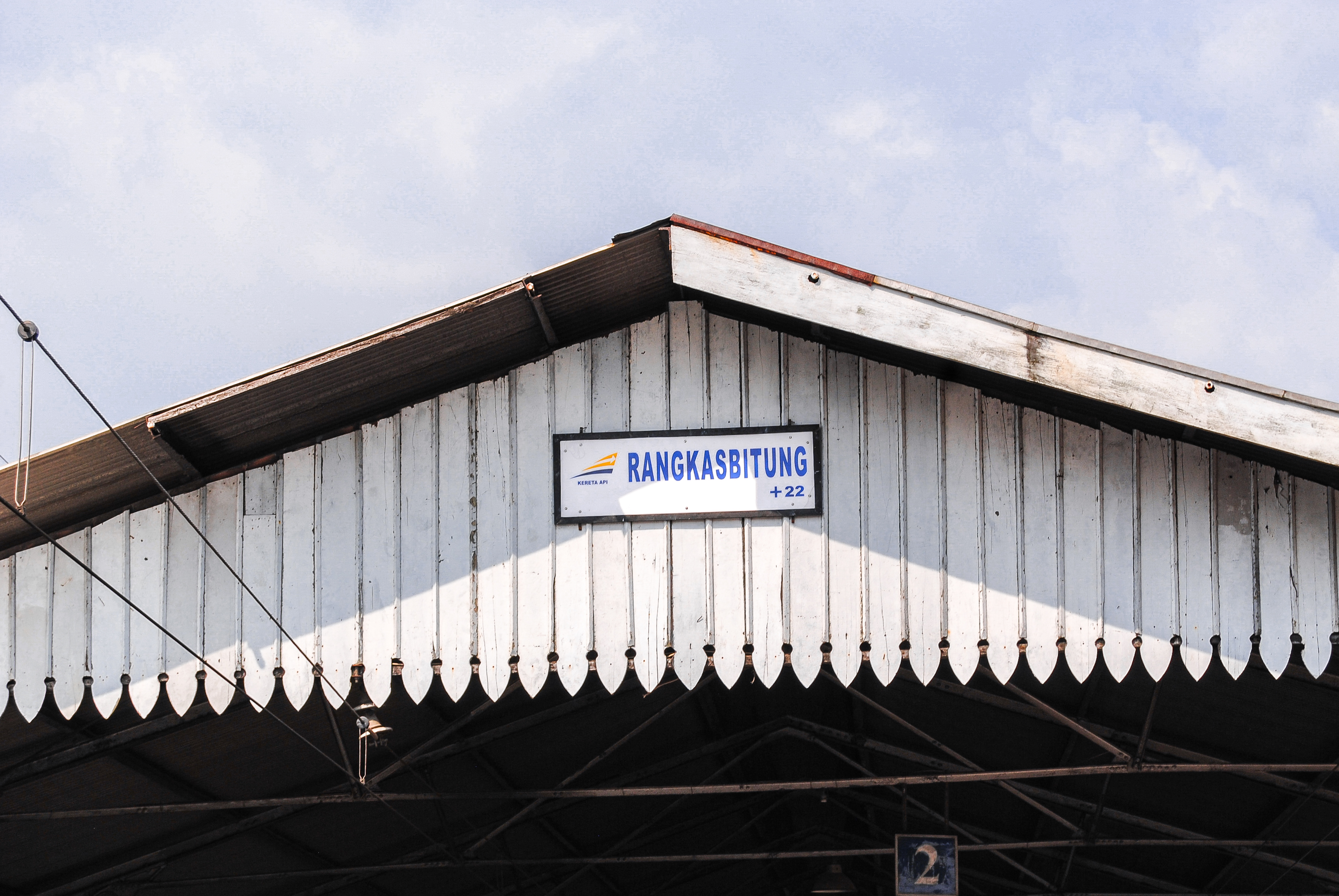
The old canopy of the station

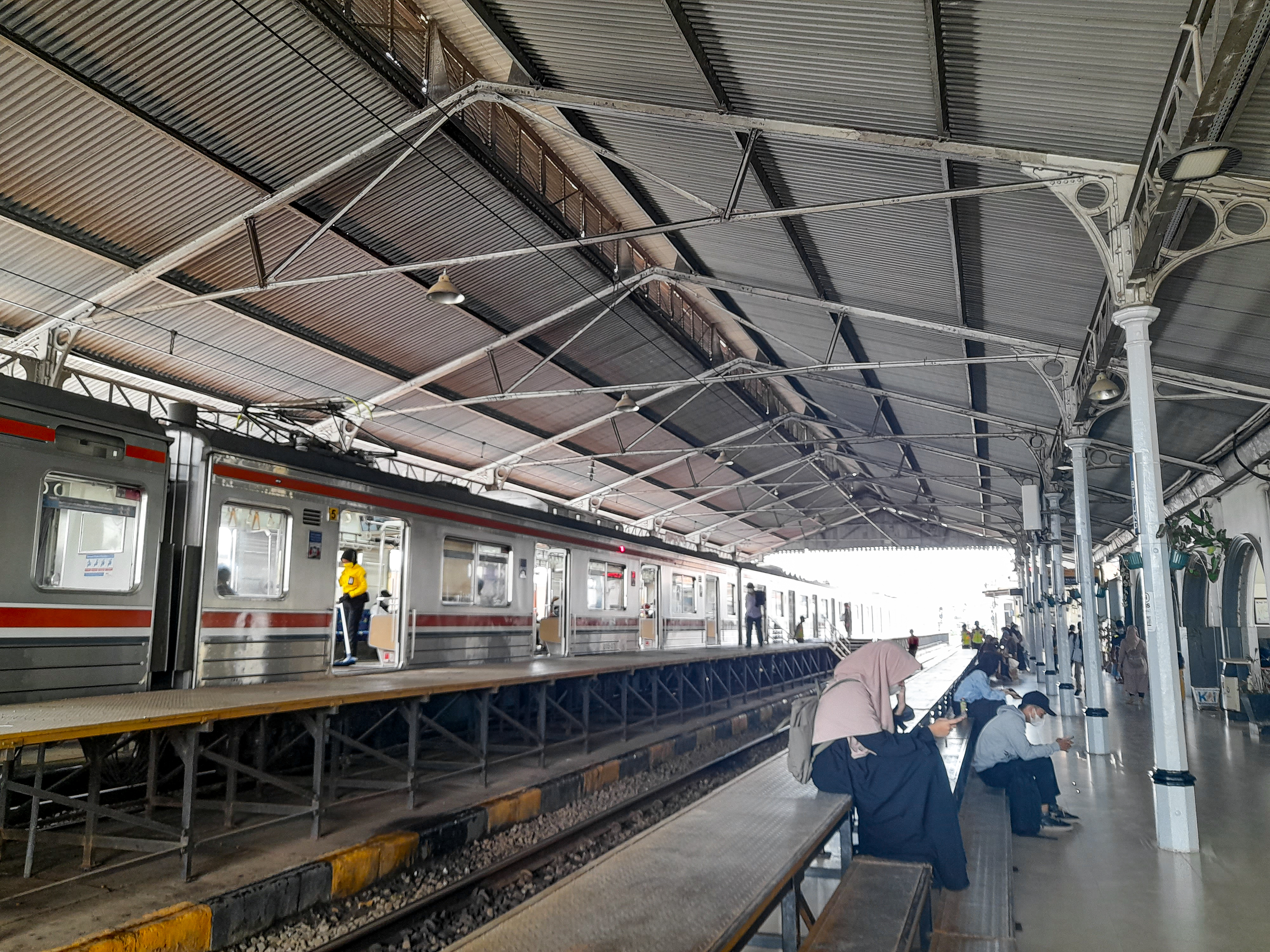
Emplacement of the station, 2022

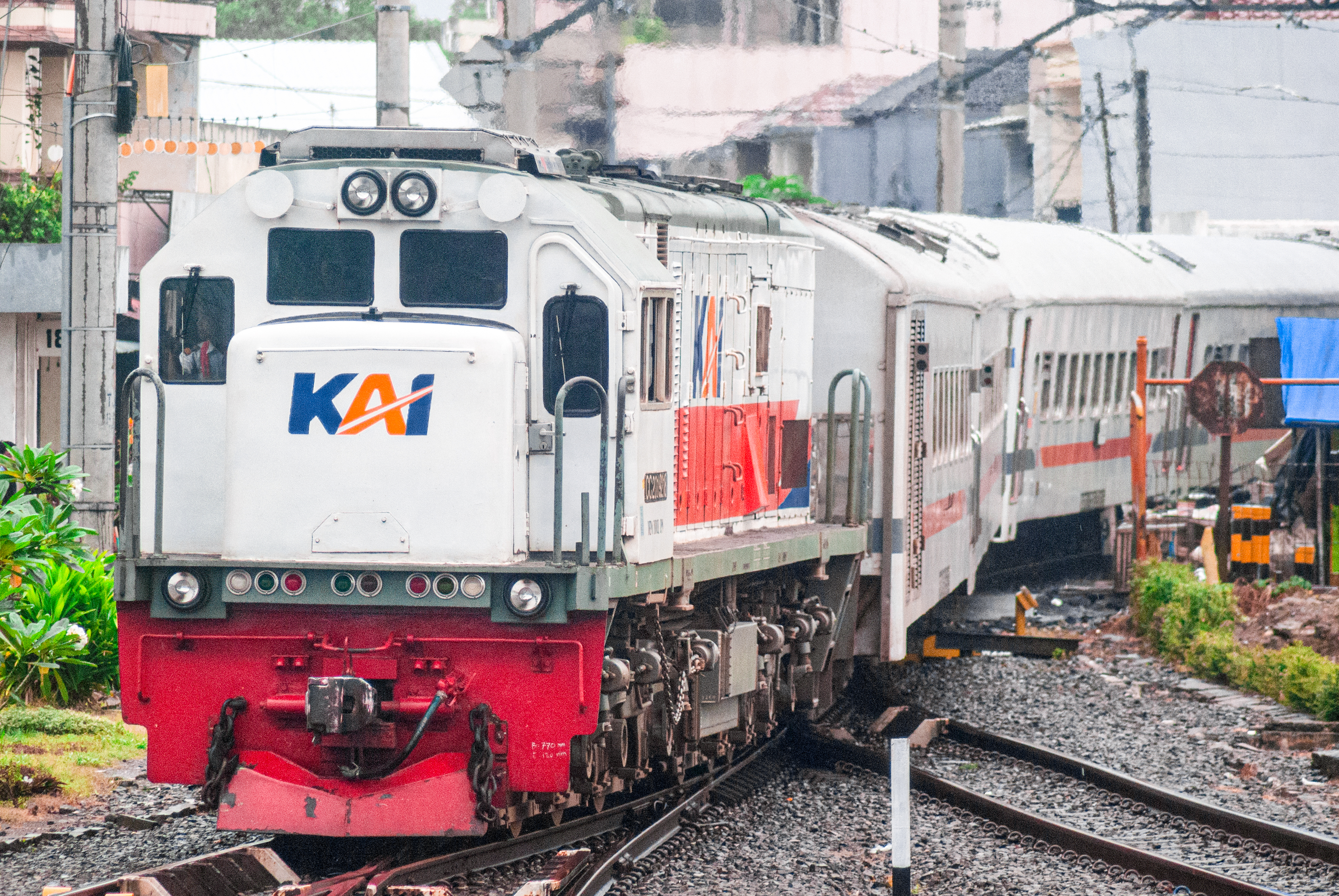
Merak Commuter Line train entering Rangkasbitung, 2022

Preceding station	Kereta Api Indonesia	Following station
Jambu Baru towards Merak	Merak–Tanah Abang	Citeras towards Tanah Abang
