= KAI Commuter =

Railway operator in Indonesia

PT Kereta Commuter Indonesia

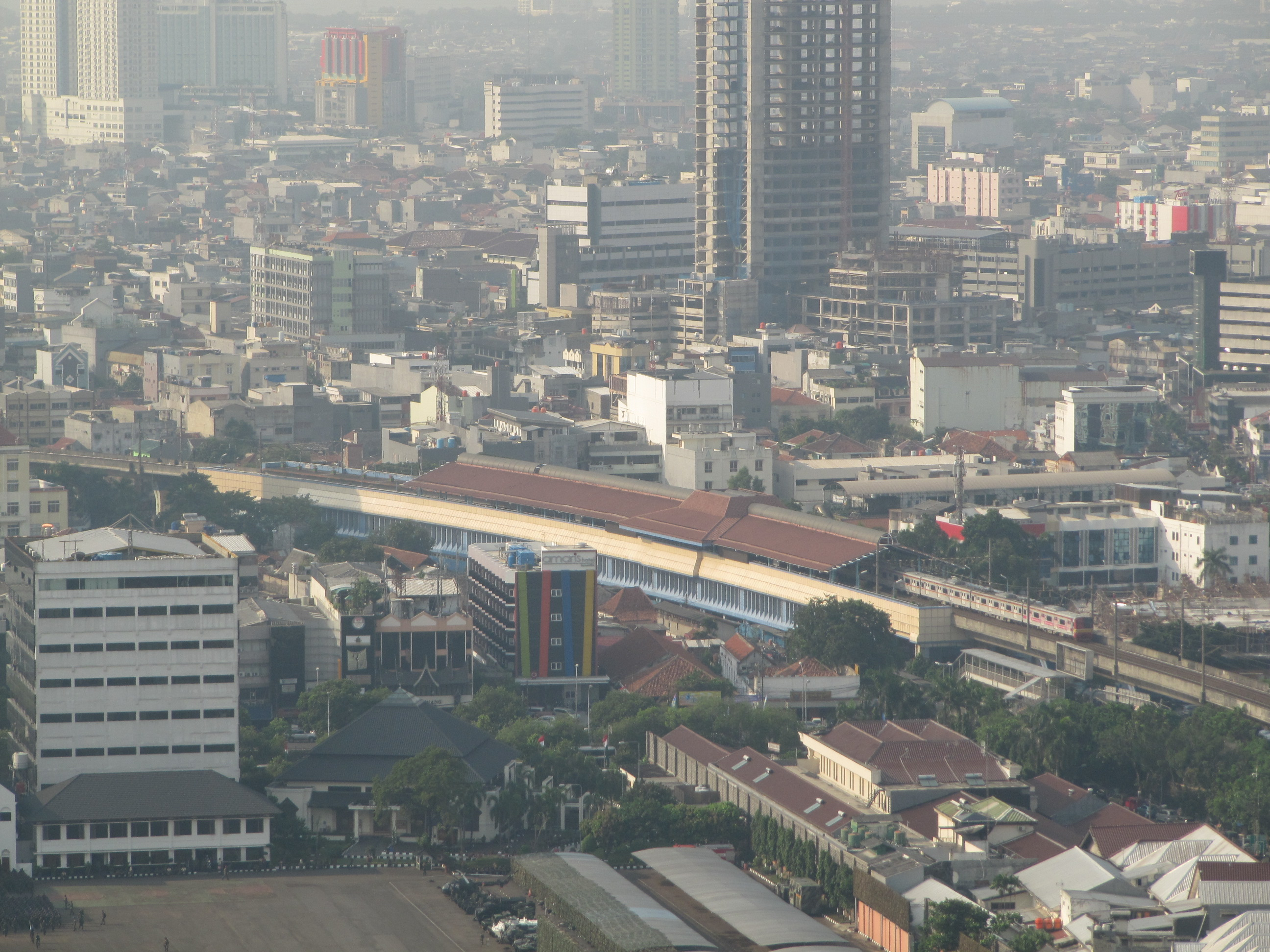
- KAI Commuter headquarters at Juanda station, Central Jakarta
- Trade name: KAI Commuter
- Formerly: PT KAI Commuter Jabodetabek
- Type: Subsidiary PT
- Industry: Commuter rail operator
- Predecessor: Jabotabek Urban Transport Division of PT Kereta Api Indonesia (Persero)
- Founded: 15 September 2008; 18 years ago
- Headquarters: Juanda Station, Jalan Ir. H. Djuanda, Central Jakarta, Jakarta, Indonesia
- Area served: Provinces of Java
- Products: See #Services
- Parent: Kereta Api Indonesia
- Website: commuterline.id

PT Kereta Commuter Indonesia (trading as KAI Commuter, abbreviated as KCI or KAIC) is a subsidiary of the Indonesian national railway company PT Kereta Api Indonesia (KAI) which manages commuter rail services. Initially founded as an operator of Greater Jakarta commuter rail, the company is currently responsible for several commuter rail and local train systems in Indonesia.

== History ==
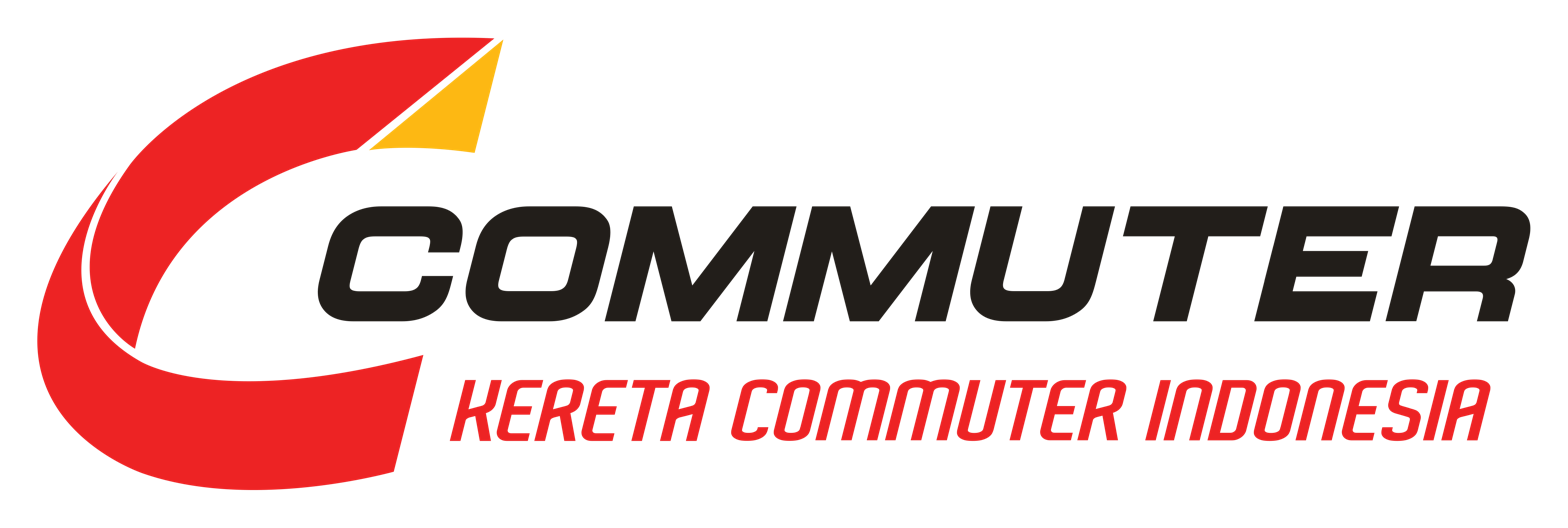
KCI former logo until 28 September 2020

KAI Commuter originated from the Jabotabek Urban Transport Division (Indonesian: Divisi Angkutan Perkotaan Jabotabek) of KAI (previously PT Kereta Api), which was separated from Operational Area I Jakarta (Daerah Operasi I Jakarta) of KAI. The division handles the Jabotabek commuter rail (currently KRL Commuterline), while the Daerah Operasi I handles long-distance trains and railway infrastructures.

KAI Commuter was founded on 15 September 2008 as PT KAI Commuter Jabodetabek (KCJ, branded later as "Commuterline" or simply "Commuter"), as a spin-off from KAI. The company formation was based on Presidential Instruction (Instruksi Presiden) No. 5 of 2008 (signed by Susilo Bambang Yudhoyono) and Letter of State Minister of State-Owned Enterprises (Surat Menneg BUMN) No. S-653/MBU/2008 dated 12 August 2008; and got its operating permits from Ministry of Transportation. The main tasks of the newly formed subsidiary is to provide commuter rail transportation services using electric trains in Jakarta, Bogor, Depok, Tangerang and Bekasi (Jabodetabek) and surrounding areas as well as non-passenger transportation business. Ticket revenues, rolling stock maintenance, and station management was transferred to KCJ, but all operational matters (e.g. scheduling and dispatching), rolling stock, stations and infrastructures remained under KAI's responsibility.

On 19 September 2017, PT KAI Commuter Jabodetabek changed its name into PT Kereta Commuter Indonesia (lit. 'Indonesia Commuter Railways'), three days after the operator's 9th anniversary. The name change reflects the wider mandate as a commuter rail operator across the country. KCI then rebranded as KAI Commuter on 28 September 2020 along with the logo change of KAI.

From 2020 onwards, KAI Commuter began expanding its operations nationwide. Starting October 2020, the operations of both the Prambanan Express commuter rail and Lokal Merak train previously managed by KAI were transferred to KAI Commuter after obtain operation permit from Ministry of Transportation on 3 June 2020. Prambanan Express is a commuter rail serving Yogyakarta and (formerly) Surakarta greater areas, which includes cities and regencies in Special Region of Yogyakarta and Central Java, while Lokal Merak is an economy-class local train operating from Rangkasbitung Station (a terminus of KRL Commuterline Green Line) to Merak Station (the westernmost station in Java which has connection to the Port of Merak) and vice versa. Prambanan Express is currently no longer serving Surakarta greater area as the electric KAI Commuter Yogyakarta Line became operational in February 2021 on the segment between Surakarta and Yogyakarta. Starting 1 April 2022, KAI Commuter took over the Greater Bandung commuter trains, which consisted of two lines. In 2024, the entire Surabaya commuter rail network began to be operated by KAI Commuter as its eastern division.

== Services ==
Area	System name	System length	Line(s)	Stations	Electric-powered
Greater Jakarta, Lebak, Karawang, and Purwakarta	KRL Commuterline	418 km	5	80	Yes
Greater Jakarta, Lebak, Karawang, and Purwakarta	Soekarno-Hatta Airport Rail Link	54.3 km	1	5	Yes
Greater Jakarta, Lebak, Karawang, and Purwakarta	Merak Commuter Line	68.5 km	1	13	No
Greater Jakarta, Lebak, Karawang, and Purwakarta	Jatiluhur	41 km	1	8	No
Greater Jakarta, Lebak, Karawang, and Purwakarta	Walahar	60 km	1	10	No
Greater Bandung and West Java	Greater Bandung Commuter Line	42 km	1	22	No
Greater Bandung and West Java	KCJB Feeder Train	14.9 km	1	3	No
Greater Bandung and West Java	Garut Commuter Line	100 km	1	29	No
Greater Yogyakarta and Surakarta	Yogyakarta Commuter Line	65.4 km	1	13	Yes
Greater Yogyakarta and Surakarta	Prambanan Express	64 km	1	5	No
Greater Surabaya and East Java	Surabaya and East Java commuter and local trains		7		No

== KMT ==
Kartu Multi Trip
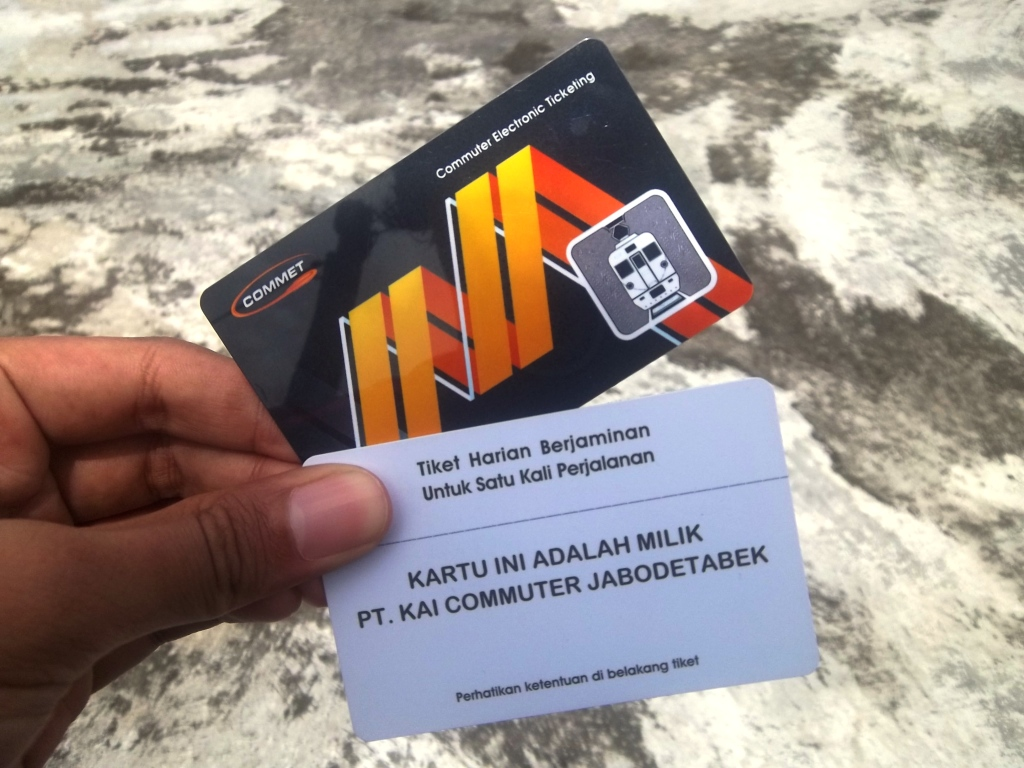
- Original 2013 multitrip (black) and single-trip (white) ticket of KRL Commuterline. Early variants has since been replaced with FeliCa based cards
- Launched: 1 July 2013
- Technology: FeliCa
- Operator: PT Kereta Commuter Indonesia (formerly by Telkom Indonesia)
- Manager: PT Kereta Commuter Indonesia
- Currency: IDR (Rp5,000 minimum load)
- Stored-value: Pay as you go
- Validity: KRL Commuterline systems; KAI station parking lots; Soekarno–Hatta Airport Rail Link; Jakarta MRT Jakarta LRT Jabodebek LRT Transjakarta
- Variants: Tiket Harian Berjaminan (THB) (single-trip, now defunct)

KMT' (Kartu Multi-Trip, "multitrip card"), or formerly COMMET (Commuter Electronic Ticketing), is the brand of contactless smart card issued by KAI Commuter. First launched on 1 July 2013, it is used primarily for multiple journey purpose in KRL Commuterline-branded services (i.e. in Greater Jakarta and Yogyakarta-Solo). The card has no expiry date. In Greater Jakarta KRL Commuterline, it can be used with a minimum credit of Rp 5,000 after KAI Commuter introduced fare adjustment machines. Passengers who don't have enough credit in their card can top-up at fare adjustment machines or two-way ticket counters.

In October 2021, KAI Commuter began a trial to expand the use of Multi Trip Card on other major public transportation systems in Greater Jakarta such as Transjakarta, MRT Jakarta and LRT Jakarta. Following the trial, KAI Commuter began to partner bus operators and local governments in Yogyakarta, Central Java and East Java, expanding the use of KMT for Trans Jateng, Trans Jogja and Trans Jatim bus systems. However, most notably, it is not accepted as a payment method for BRT programs supported by central government-backed Teman Bus and Biskita.

There were single-trip cards called THB (Tiket Harian Berjaminan, "guaranteed daily ticket") running on the same system, but with an expiry date of seven days since last purchase. The THB was discontinued in August 2019.

== See also ==
- Kereta Api Indonesia
- Rail transport in Indonesia
