= Palmerah railway station =

Railway station in Indonesia

R02 Palmerah Station Stasiun Palmerah
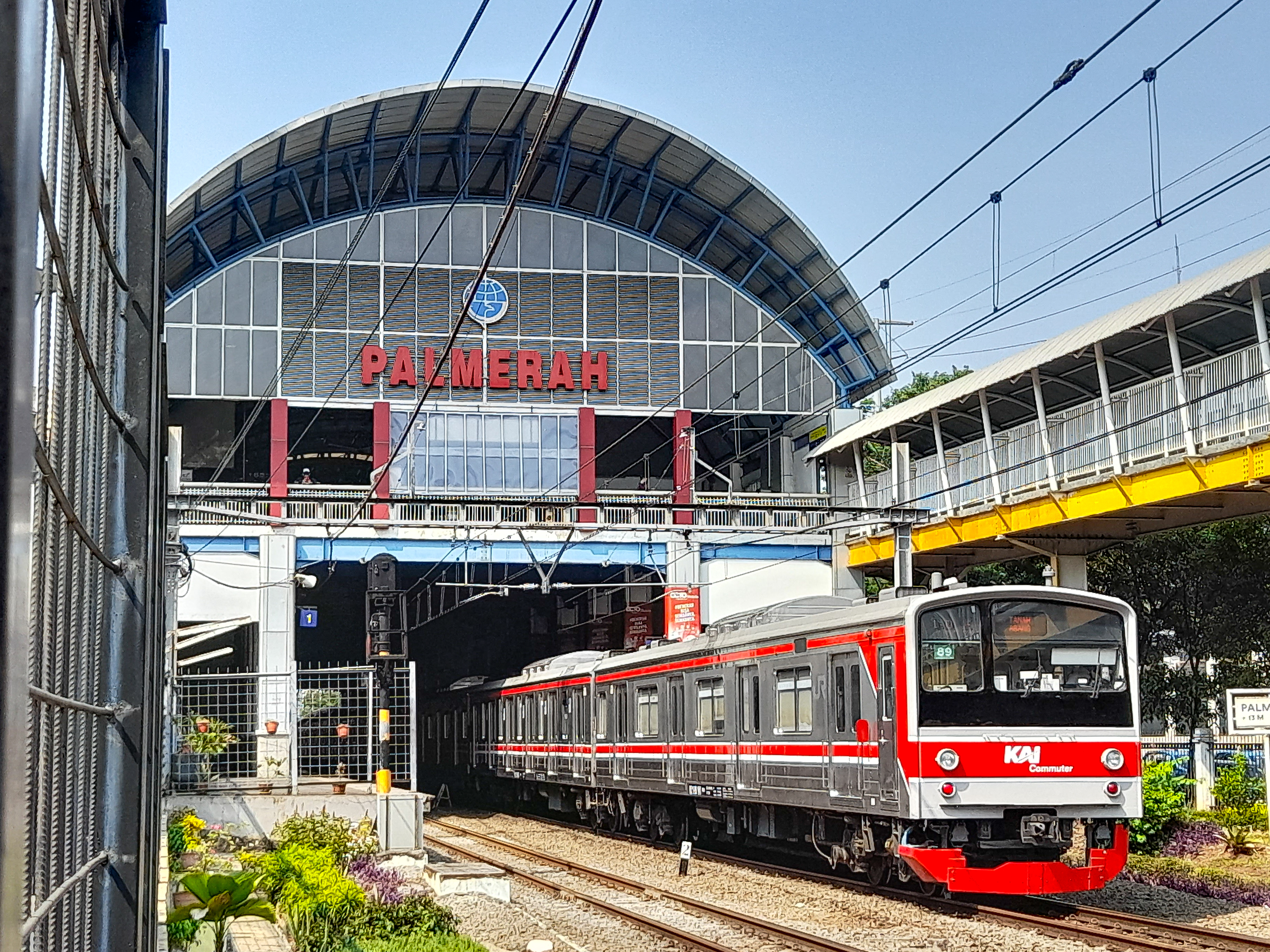
- The exterior of the new Palmerah Station building, and KRL Green Line crosses

General information
- Location: Jl. Tentara Pelajar, Gelora, Tanah Abang, Central Jakarta; Jakarta; Indonesia
- Coordinates: 6°12′28″S 106°47′53″E
- Elevation: +13 m (43 ft)
- Owner: Kereta Api Indonesia
- Operator: KAI Commuter
- Lines: Rangkasbitung Line; Merak–Tanah Abang
- Platforms: 2 island platforms
- Tracks: 2

Construction
- Structure type: Ground
- Parking: Available
- Accessible: Available

Other information
- Station code: PLM • 0217
- Classification: Class II

History
- Opened: 1 October 1899
- Rebuilt: 2013–2014
- Electrified: 1992
- Former names: Paal Merah Halt

Services
| Preceding station | | Following station |
|---|---|---|
| Tanah Abang Terminus | Rangkasbitung Commuter Line | Kebayoran towards Rangkasbitung |
Location
- Location within Jakarta

Palmerah Station (PLM) is a railway station located in Jalan Tentara Pelajar, Gelora, Tanah Abang, Central Jakarta, near the Palmerah market. The station is located in the altitude of +13 meters above sea level, and only serves KRL Commuterline's Rangkasbitung Line.

Palmerah Station was rebuilt in 2013–2014 and features a new two-storey station building. The old building was preserved and the new building straddles above it.

The Palmerah market and Parliament building is located adjacent to the station. The station services the Gelora Bung Karno Stadium and the surrounding sports complex.

== History ==
=== Background ===
During the Dutch East Indies era, Palmerah area was one of the sub-districts in Batavia located in a strategic area. Its name originally comes from the red stakes that are located on the roadside in the area, who the locals call them Paal Merah. These stakes are markers for the boundaries of Batavia area towards Buitenzorg. In the past, the Governors General who was in power at the time often passed this road when wanted to ride a horse-drawn carriage from Batavia to the Bogor Palace.

To make trips from Batavia to Rangkasbitung and Banten area smoother, in the 1890s the Staatsspoorwegen built a railroad line and its stations (including Palmerah Station) that linked Duri to Rangkasbitung, passing through Tanah Abang. This project was completed in 1899, and regular trains were started immediately.

=== Post-independence ===
==== 1960s-1970s ====
In the early 1960s, the Gelora Bung Karno Main Stadium (GBK) and its surrounding complex was built for the 1962 Asian Games. The construction was also expected to include 2 overpasses: the Jalan Arteria Raya overpass located in Rawa Simprug area, and Jakarta Inner Ring Road overpass in the Pejompongan area. To help the delivery and unloading of construction materials, a branch was made from Palmerah Station to GBK construction site. Building materials such as sand, stone, lime, etc. were brought by train; these materials were taken from the branch near Rawa Buntu Station which leads to the Cisadane river bank. The same was constructed at Kebayoran Station; in 1950-60s this station track had a branch towards the warehouse managed by the Ministry of Public Works (PU) to unload materials transported by rail for the Kebayoran Baru satellite city development. The material carriages for the GBK construction were parked at the Palmerah Station yard, which at the time still had a lot of sidings for project needs, and the carriages were shunting to the construction site using the B51 steam locomotive. Also at the time, a spur was built that led to Pejompongan for a drinking water company (PAM) facility construction. Materials for the construction of this facility were brought by rail and unloaded at the construction site. The spur leading to the GBK project was only used during the construction period and was no longer used when the construction was over, until finally it was dismantled at one time and the former railbed becomes Gelora street (Jalan Gelora). The same fate also happened to the spur leading to the PAM project; it was only used during the construction period, closed, and the former railbed area becomes a dense settlement next to Jalan Pejompongan Raya. Some part of the spur was not completely dismantled, but were just covered with earth or asphalt. There are still pieces of rail left in a dense residential alley where the railbed used to be. The remaining pieces of rail were deliberately not dismantled and used by residents as a small bridge to cross a ditch.

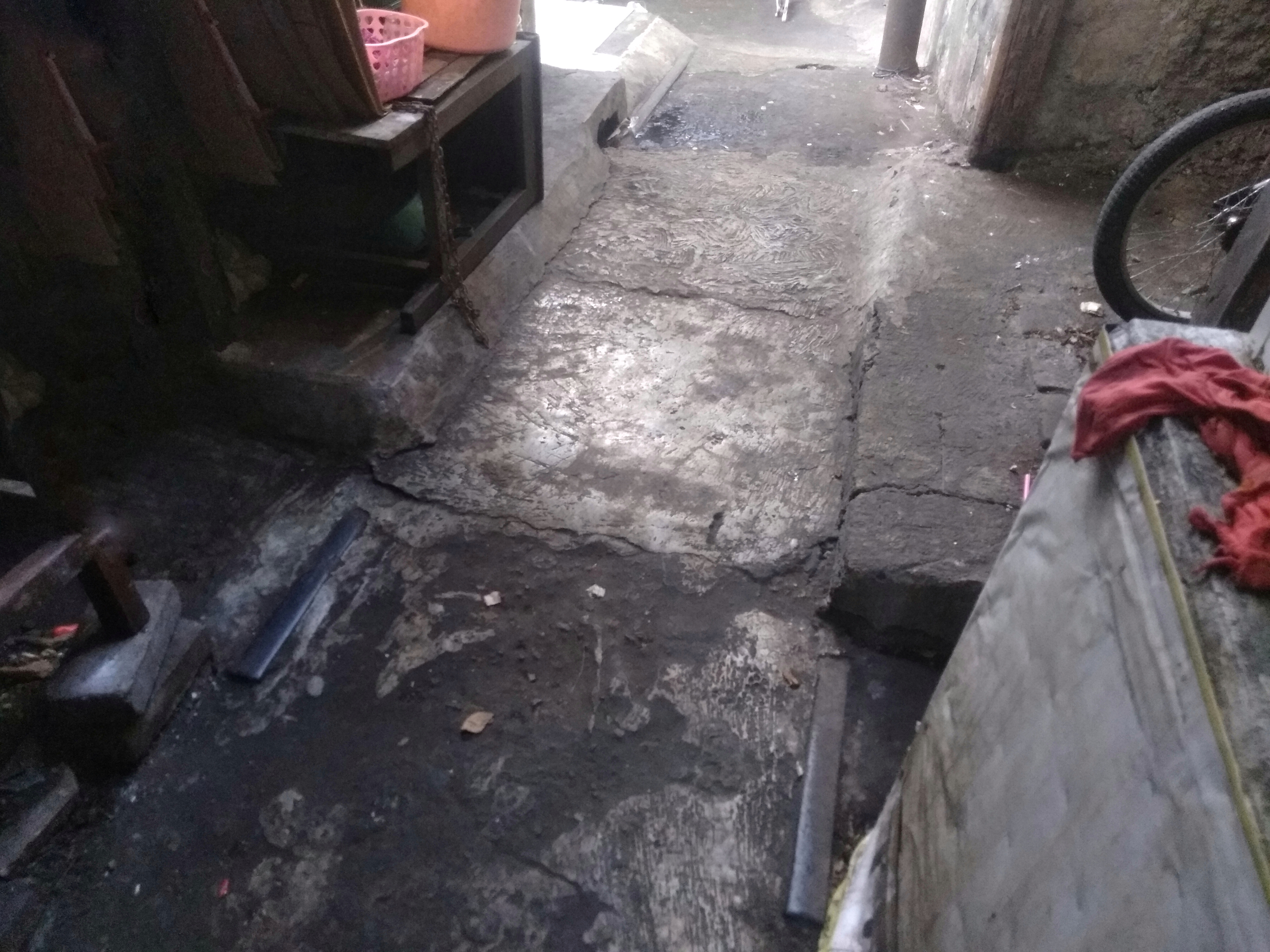
The remainings of the PAM spur (from Pejompongan)

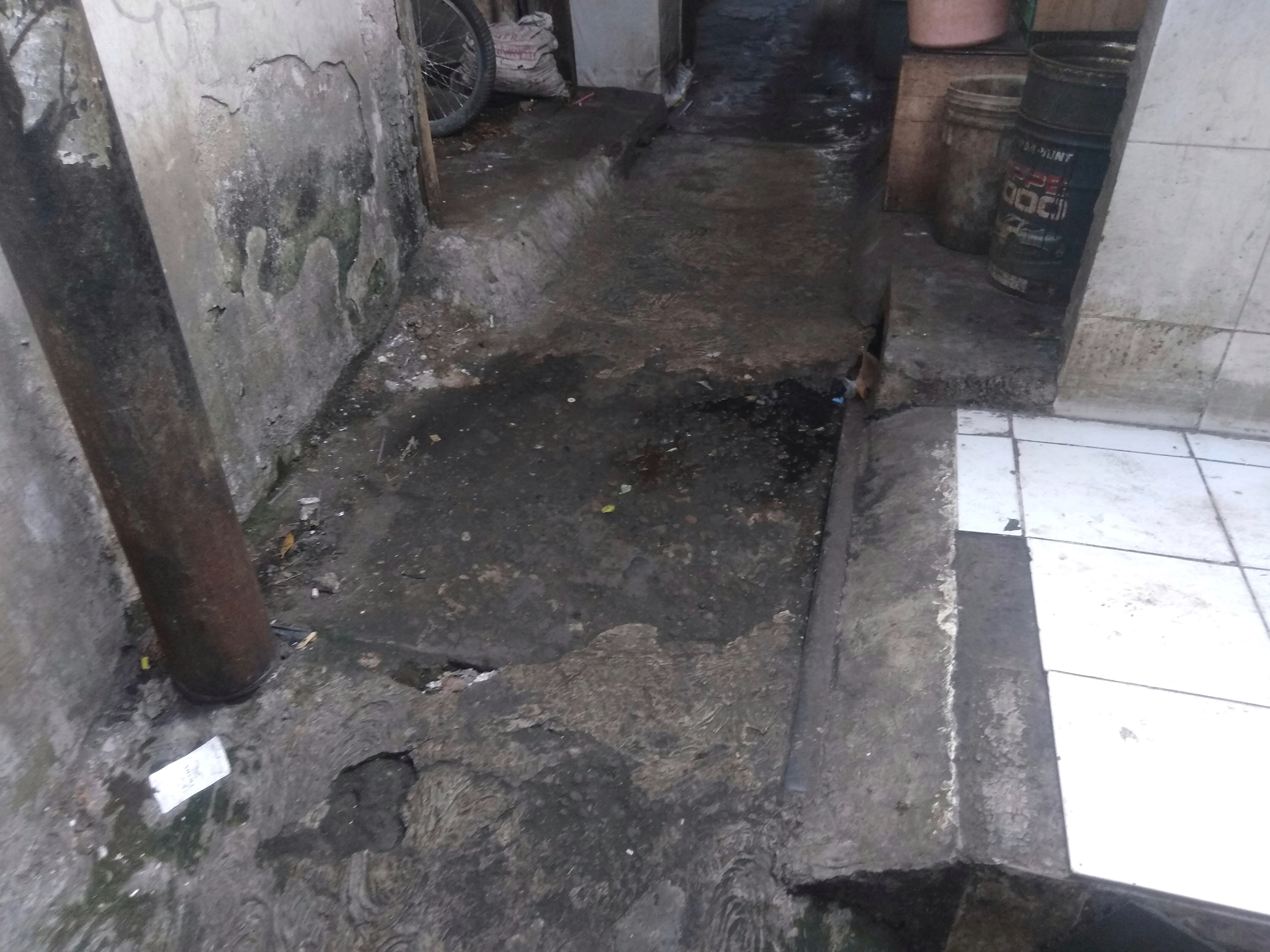
The remainings of the PAM spur (from Palmerah)

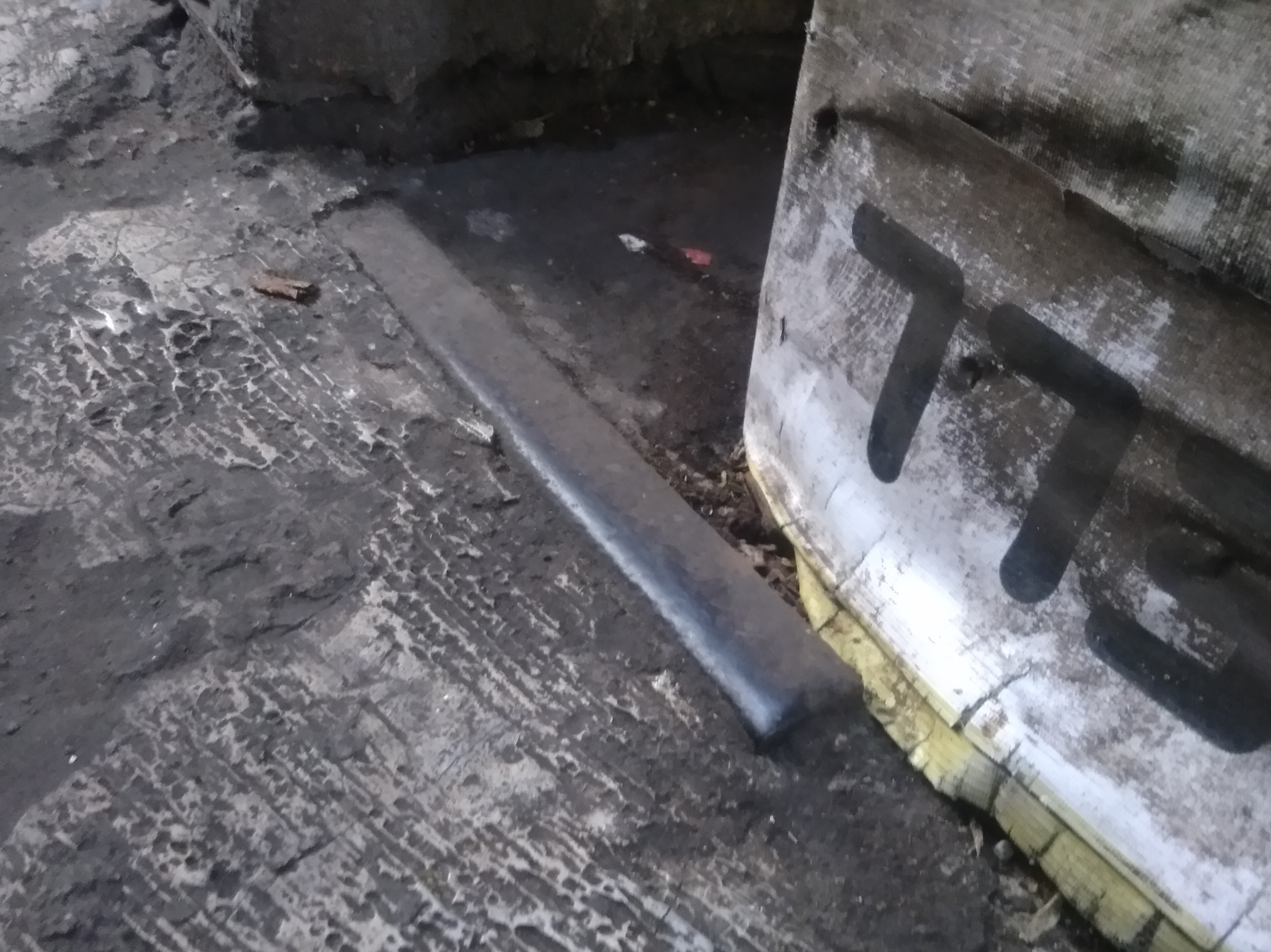
A steel rail remaining

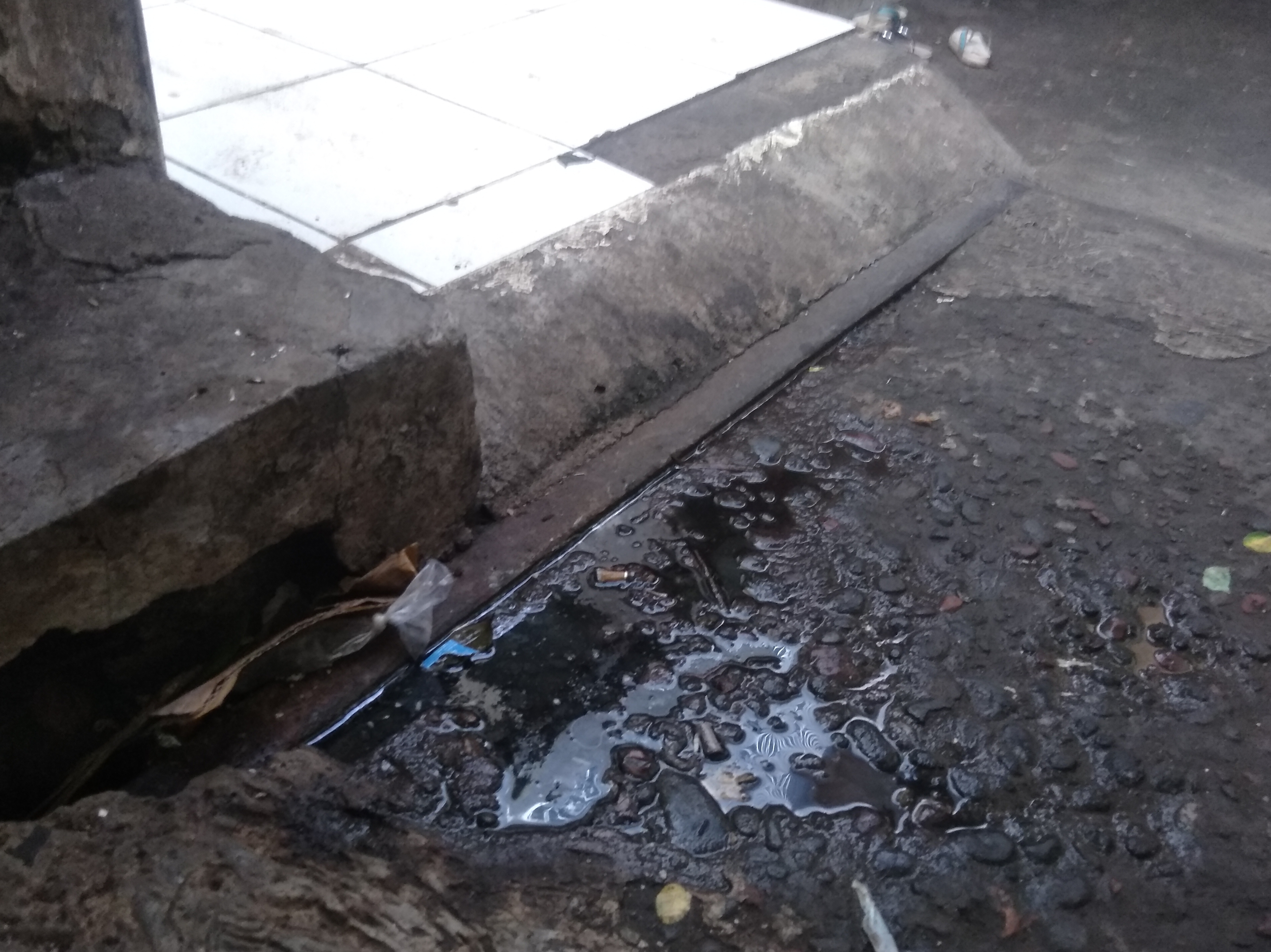
A steel rail remaining

In the 1960-70s, Palmerah Station had a wide rail yard and quite tracks. It is estimated that there are five railroad tracks to the left of the yard and two dead-end sidings to the right (from the direction of Tanah Abang Station), as well as two passing tracks. The five tracks on the yard's left were used for storing or stabling freight trains, which were also used to store a series of carriages for the GBK construction. Meanwhile, the two dead-end sidings on the right side are used for loading and unloading sand, stone, lime, wood charcoal, and the like. At the time, the B51 steam locomotive, the C300 locomotive, and the BB300 locomotive were used for yard activities at the station yard.

==== 1990s ====
It is estimated that in the early 1990s the siding rails at Palmerah Station were dismantled because they were no longer needed, leaving only 2 lanes for traffic or crossings. The former railroad tracks were later built into Jalan Tentara Pelajar on both sides of the station, both those that lead to Pejompongan and those that lead towards Rawa Simprug.

In 1992-1994, the Tanah Abang-Serpong line was electrified with French model overhead power line, to support the Serpong Ekspres EMU route which was touted as the forerunner of the present day KRL Rangkasbitung Line. It is also estimated that in the early 1990s the station platform was also renovated into a higher platform.

=== Contemporary history ===
In the early 2000s, Palmerah Station had two tracks, with track 1 (as a straight track) and track 2 (as a turning track). Since the operation of the double track on the Tanah Abang-Serpong line as of 4 July 2007, the station layout has been overhauled by adding track 2 as a new straight track.

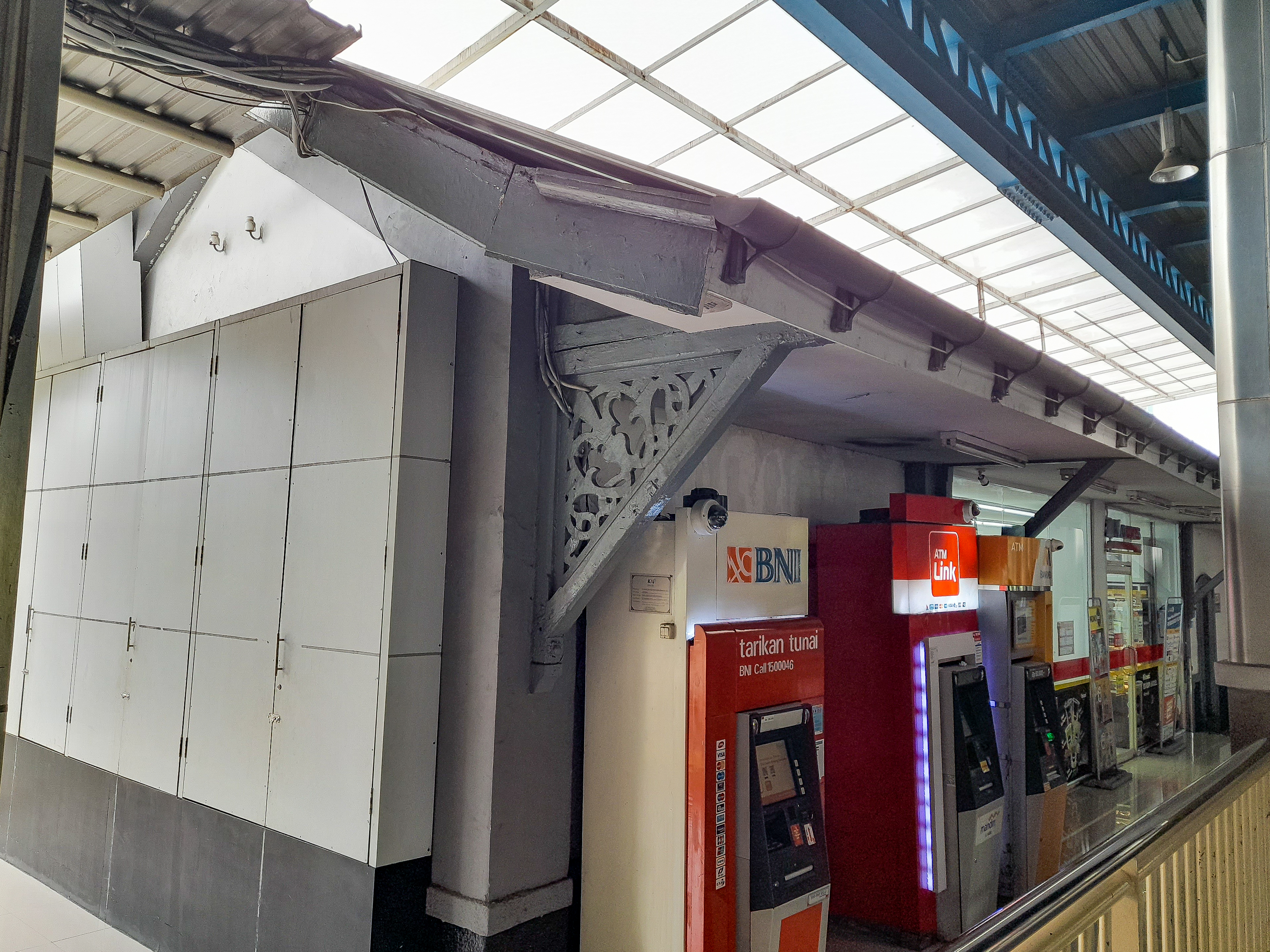
Palmerah Station original building, which is used for a grocery store

In 2013-2015, the Indonesian Ministry of Transportation carried out a major renovation of Palmerah Station into two levels, so that the station complex became more spacious and grander. The project costs around Rp36 billion, and was inaugurated on 6 July 2015. Nevertheless, the old station building of the Staatsspoorwegen legacy is still maintained today.

Further arrangement was also made in 2020-2021, to strengthening intermodal integration (especially Transjakarta buses) and providing convenient access for pedestrians. The arrangement was carried out under PT Moda Integrasi Transportasi Jakarta (MITJ), a joint venture between Jakarta MRT and Kereta Api Indonesia. It was inaugurated on 29 September 2021, along with a similar project in Tebet.

In November 2020, the Jakarta Office of Transportation closed the level crossing near Palmerah Station permanently. One of the goals is to eliminate traffic violations that often occur at the crossing. This was revealed by the head of the Office of Transportation, Syafrin Liputo. He said closing the level crossing was part of the stage 2 of the Palmerah Station arrangement.

== Station layout ==
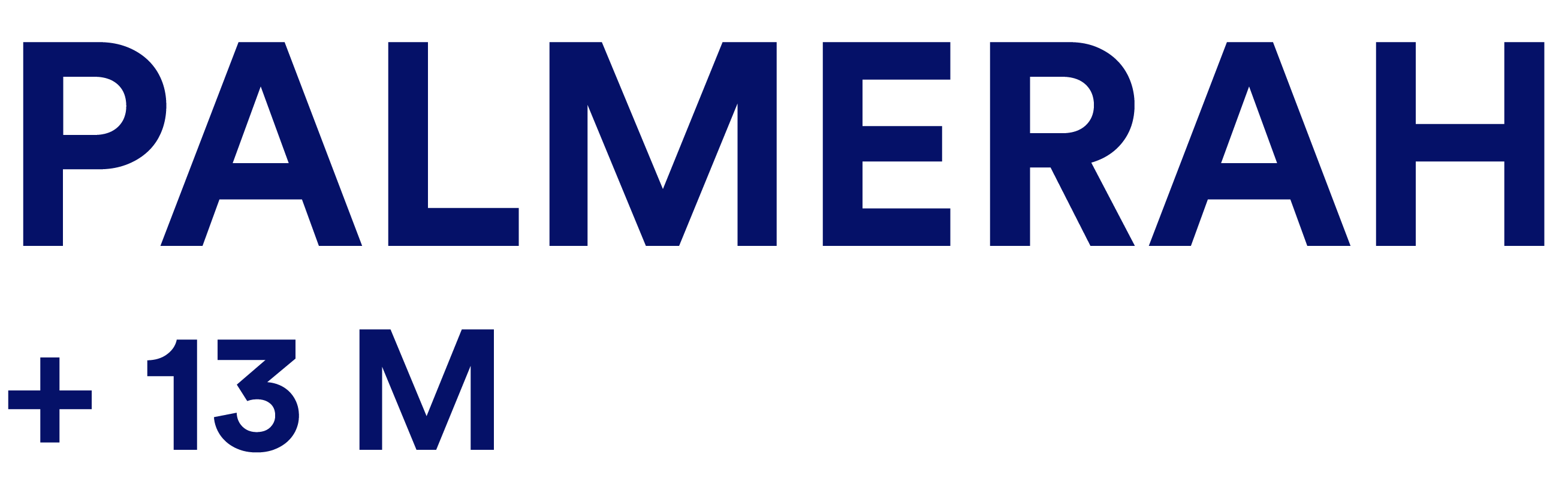
R02
| G | Main building |
| Platform floor | Side platform, the doors are opened on the right side |
| Platform floor | Line 1 | ← (Kebayoran) Rangkasbitung Line to Serpong/Tigaraksa/Rangkasbitung |
| Platform floor | Line 2 | Rangkasbitung Line to Tanah Abang (Tanah Abang) → |
| Platform floor | Side platform, the doors are opened on the right side |

== Services ==
The following is a list of train services at the Palmerah Station.

- KRL Commuterline
  - Green Line, to Tanah Abang and to Serpong (Serpong branch)
  - Green Line, to Tanah Abang and to Parung Panjang (Parung Panjang branch)
  - Green Line, to Tanah Abang and to Maja (Maja branch)
  - Green Line, to Tanah Abang and to Rangkasbitung (Rangkasbitung branch)

== Supporting transportation ==
| Type | Route | Destination |
|---|---|---|
| Transjakarta | Train station feeder | Palmerah Station–Tosari |
| Transjakarta | | Palmerah Station–Bundaran Senayan |
| Transjakarta | | Tanah Abang Station–Kebayoran |
| Transjakarta | | Jelambar–Kebayoran |

== Gallery ==
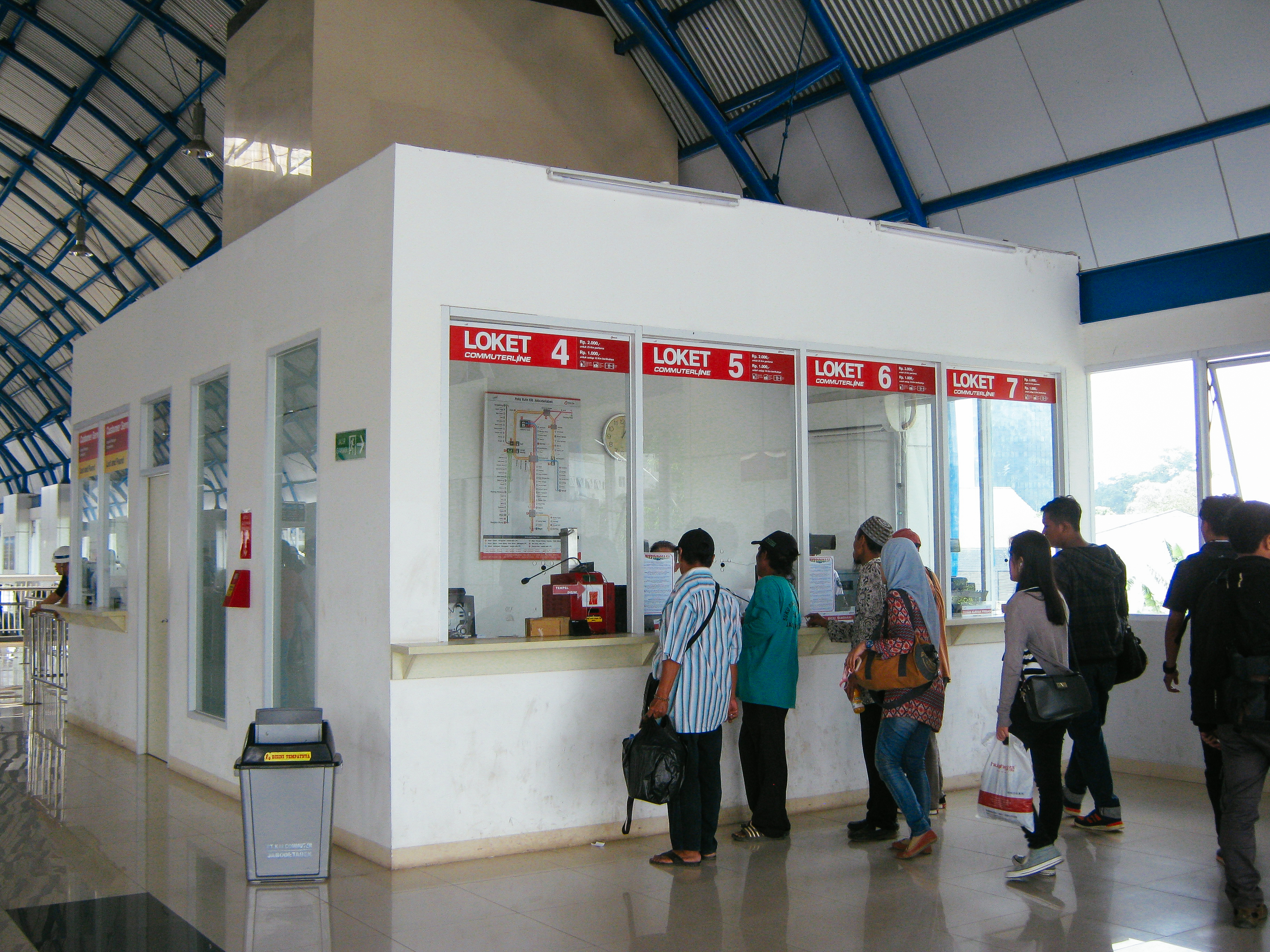
The ticket counter of the station

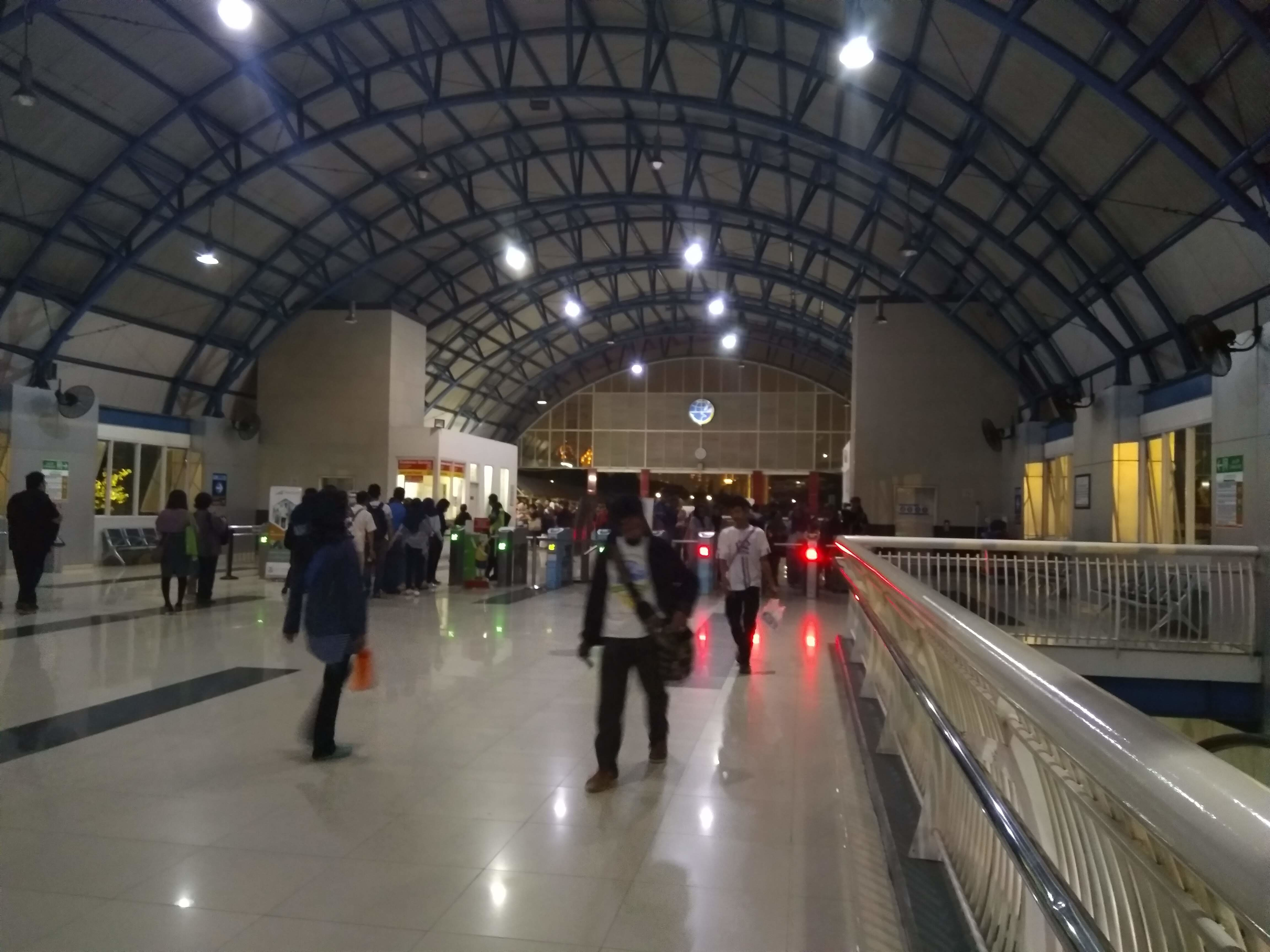
The interior of the station's new building.

| Preceding station | Kereta Api Indonesia | Following station |
|---|---|---|
| Kebayoran towards Merak | Merak–Tanah Abang | Tanah Abang; Terminus |
