= Citra Maja Raya =

Township development in Banten, Indonesia

Citra Maja Raya is a township development at Maja, Banten, Indonesia. The township is located about 80 km west of Jakarta, which has a land area of about 2000 hectares. This is part of 15000 hectares development zone, which is being developed by Ciputra group (alongside other developers) and expected to house 1.2 million people once completed. Maja is one of the 10 new public City, as stipulated in Indonesian Presidential Decree No. 2 of 2015 in the National Medium Term Development Plan 2015–2019.

Citra Maja Raya is designed to be an integrated city area based on transit-oriented development by transforming Maja railway station as the main transportation hub. The township is being developed in 27 clusters/sectors with individual name. There will be 8,000 units of house for low-income people. Development of the first cluster with an area of 430 hectares already completed. As of August 2018, 13,000 units of house are being developed, of which 7000 housing units are handed over to owners. A commercial area with shop-houses is also being developed.

== Transportation ==
Citra Maja Raya is about 1 km from Maja station of Greater Jakarta Commuter Rail.

== See also ==
- Lebak Regency
