= Rawa Buntu railway station =

Railway station in Indonesia

R07 Rawa Buntu Station Stasiun Rawa Buntu
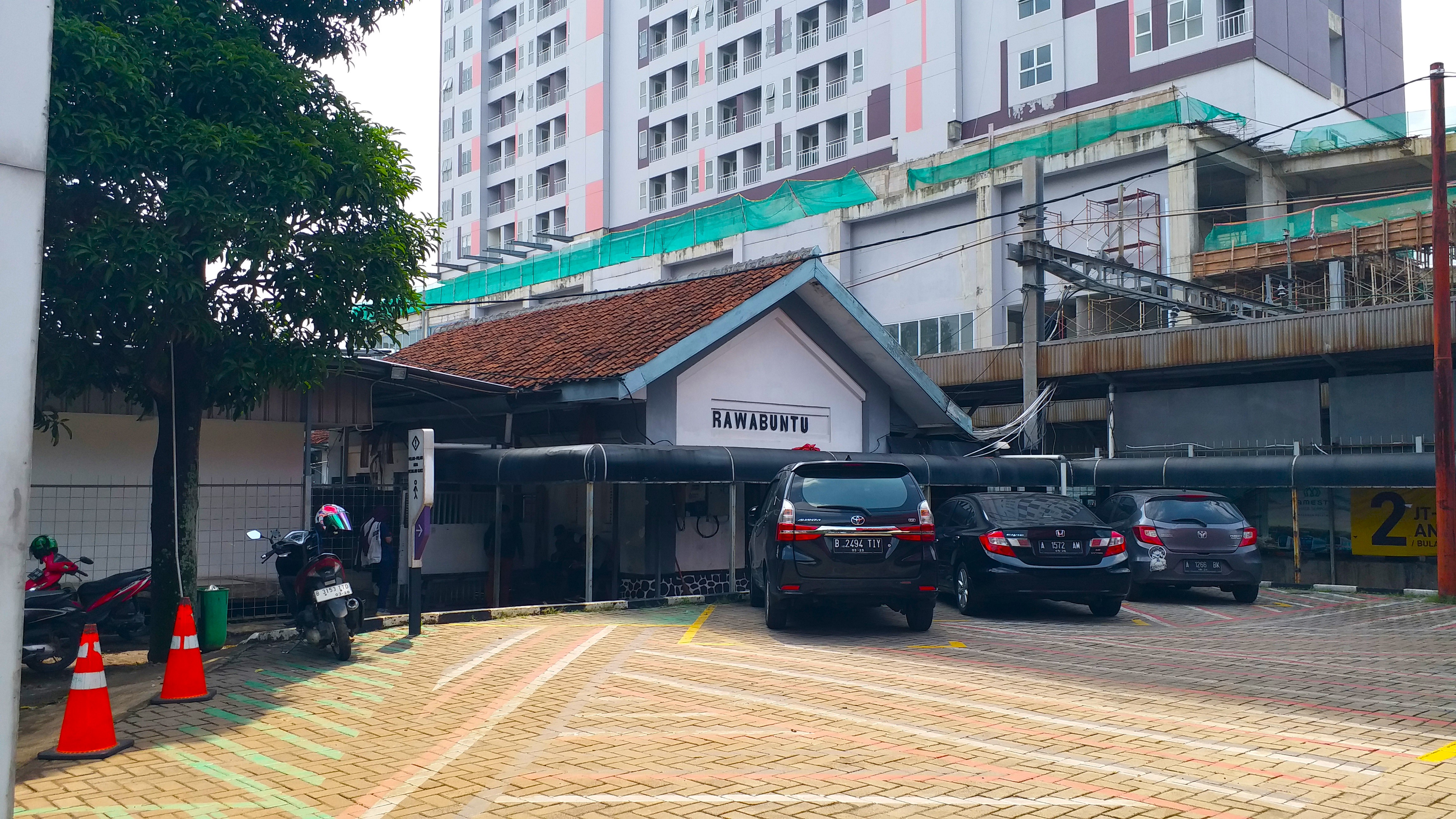
- Rawa Buntu Station building in 2024

General information
- Location: Rawa Buntu, Serpong, South Tangerang; Banten; Indonesia
- Coordinates: 6.315037°S 106.676157°E
- Owner: Kereta Api Indonesia
- Operator: KAI Commuter
- Lines: Rangkasbitung Line; Merak–Tanah Abang
- Platforms: 2 side platforms
- Tracks: 2

Construction
- Structure type: Ground
- Parking: Available
- Accessible: Available

Other information
- Station code: RU • 0212
- Classification: Class III

History
- Opened: 1 October 1889
- Electrified: 1992
- Former names: Rawaboentoe Stopplaats

Services
Preceding station		Following station
Sudimara towards Tanah Abang	Rangkasbitung Commuter Line	Serpong towards Rangkasbitung
Location
- Location within Java

Rawa Buntu Station (RU) is a class III railway station located in Rawa Buntu, Serpong, South Tangerang. This station is included in the Operational Area I Jakarta, and is located adjacent to the planned city complex Bumi Serpong Damai (BSD). This station is not far from the Serpong exit on the west Jakarta–Serpong Toll Road. In addition, the station is strategically located because it is close to a residential complex in the Serpong area.

== History ==
In order for the mobility of passengers from Batavia to Rangkasbitung and Banten area to run more smoothly, in the 1890s the Staatsspoorwegen company built a railroad line and its stations (including Rawa Buntu Station in 1911, which at that time was still a railway stop) that connected the Duri Station to the Rangkasbitung, passing through the Tanah Abang. This project was completed in 1899, and regular trains serving the route were immediately started.

Since the Dutch East Indies era, there was once a branch rail from this bus stop that headed to the banks of the Cisadane river through the Cilenggang area to transport building materials, such as stone, sand, coral, and the like using rail transportation. These materials were used to build various things, such as for example the construction of Gelora Bung Karno Stadium and the construction of the Kebayoran Baru satellite city. This branch rail survived into the 1980s, when it was finally dismantled at some point.

In 1992-1994, the Tanah Abang–Serpong railway was electrified with French model overhead lines (LAA), one of which was to support the KRL Serpong Ekspres journey which was touted as the forerunner of the KAI Commuter Green Line. The old station building which is a legacy of the Staatsspoorwegen is still being maintained.

== Building and layout ==
In the early 2000s, Rawa Buntu Station only had 1 line for boarding and alighting activities. Since the operation of the double track on the Tanah Abang–Serpong railway on 4 July 2007, the layout of this station has changed by adding line 2 as a new line. The station platform was also renovated into a higher platform in 2007-2009, so that the activities of KRL passengers would be easier.

Since October 2014, this station can serve KRL with a formation of 10 trains along with the completion of the renovation and extension of the platform. However, this KRL with the formation of 10 trains only started operating on the Serpong route in January 2016. In the development plan carried out by the South Tangerang City Government, PT KAI, PT KCJ, and BSD City in 2012, this station was renovated so that BSD residents could use KRL Commuterline services to various directions.

In 2020, the station platform has been extended so that it is ready to serve KRL with a series of 12 train cars, and a new apartment which is integrated with this station building.

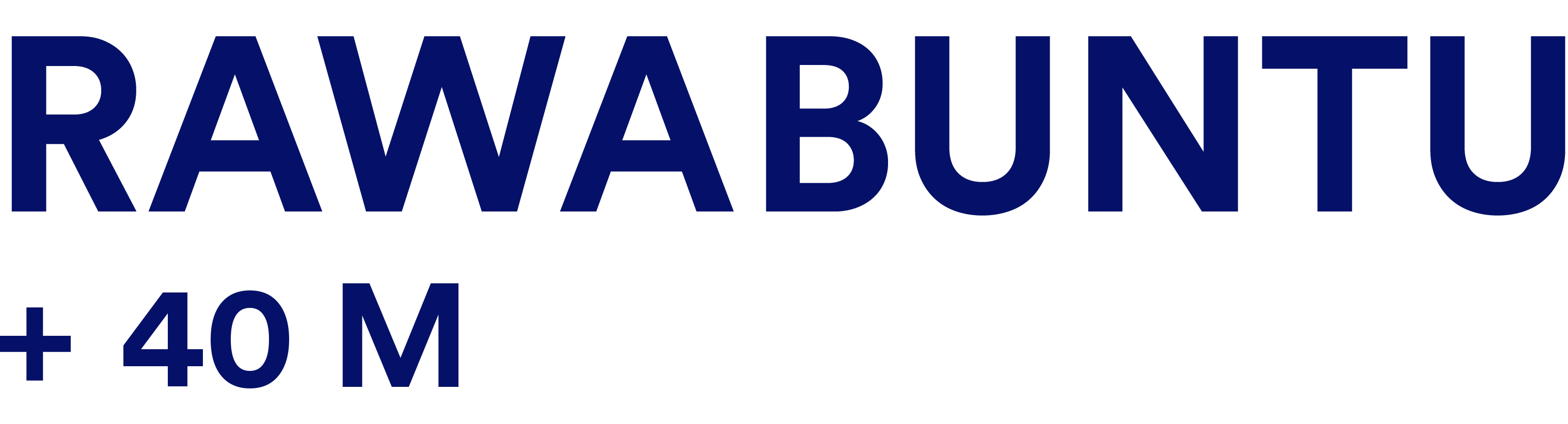
R07
G	Main building	
Platform floor	Side platform, the doors are opened on the right side	
Platform floor	Line 1	← (Serpong) Rangkasbitung Line to Serpong/Tigaraksa/Rangkasbitung
Platform floor	Line 2	Rangkasbitung Line to Tanah Abang (Sudimara) →
Platform floor	Side platform, the doors are opened on the right side	
G	Main building	

== Services ==
The following is a list of train services at the Rawa Buntu Station.

- KRL Commuterline
  - Green Line, towards Tanah Abang and Serpong (Serpong branch)
  - Green Line, towards Tanah Abang and Parung Panjang (Parung Panjang branch)
  - Green Line, towards Tanah Abang and Maja (Maja branch)
  - Green Line, towards Tanah Abang and Rangkasbitung (Rangkasbitung branch)

== Intermodal support ==
Public transport type	Line	Destination
Angkot	B04	Tangcity Mall-Rawa Buntu Station-BSD Market
Trans Anggrek	TA2	Rawabuntu Station–Pondok Cabe Bus Terminal

Preceding station	Kereta Api Indonesia	Following station
Serpong towards Merak	Merak–Tanah Abang	Sudimara towards Tanah Abang
