= Citeras railway station =

Railway station in Indonesia

R21 Citeras Station Stasiun Citeras
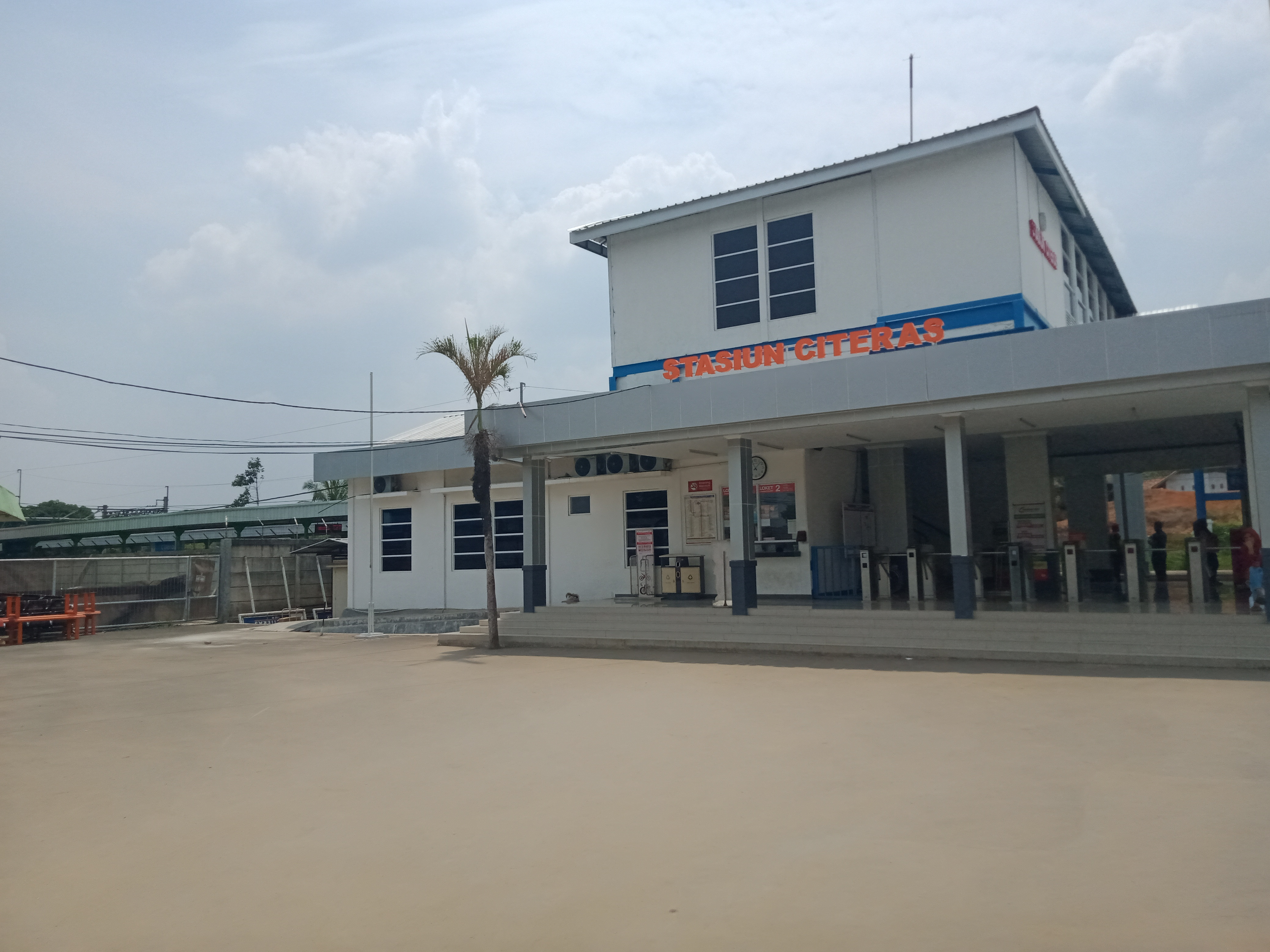
- Citeras Station, photo was taken on 24 November 2019.

General information
- Location: Mekarsari, Rangkasbitung, Lebak Regency; Banten; Indonesia
- Coordinates: 6.3348949999999995°S 106.3326455°E
- Elevation: +48 m (157 ft)
- Owner: Kereta Api Indonesia
- Operator: KAI Commuter
- Lines: Rangkasbitung Line; Merak–Tanah Abang
- Platforms: 1 island platform 1 side platform
- Tracks: 3

Construction
- Structure type: Ground
- Parking: Available
- Accessible: Available

Other information
- Station code: CTR
- Classification: Class III

History
- Opened: 1 October 1899
- Electrified: 2017

Services
Preceding station		Following station
Maja towards Tanah Abang	Rangkasbitung Commuter Line	Rangkasbitung Terminus
Location
- Location within Java

Citeras Station (CTR) is a class III railway station located in Mekarsari, Rangkasbitung, Lebak Regency. The station, which is located at an altitude of +48 meters, is included in the Jakarta Operational Area I and only serves the KRL Commuterline route. Although it is named Citeras, this station is not located in Citeras Village, but is located to the east of the village itself.

Before KCJ extended the Green Line to Rangkasbitung, this station only served crossing and overtaking between trains for some time. In order to improve commuter rail services in the Lebak Regency area, PT KAI Commuter Jabodetabek then extended the KRL Commuterline route to Rangkasbitung Station. The old Citeras Station underwent a series of renovations to support the operation of the KRL Commuterline. Eventually, the KRL can run to Rangkasbitung starting 1 April 2017.

== Building and layout ==
Initially, this station only had two railway lines with line 2 as a straight line. To welcome the operation of the double track segment of Maja–Rangkasbitung, the number of railway lines at this station has been increased to three with the existing track 1 being made a straight track towards Rangkasbitung, while line 2 being made a straight track towards Tanah Abang. The station building has also been updated with a more modern and minimalist architecture. Because the construction of this new station took up the land where the old Staatsspoorwegen station building was located, the old station building was torn down. The platform at this station has also been extended to accommodate a long cars (12 cars).

R21 Citeras
G	Main building
P Platform floor	Side platform, the doors are opened on the right side
P Platform floor	Line 1	← (Rangkasbitung) Rangkasbitung Line to Rangkasbitung
P Platform floor	Line 2	Rangkasbitung Line to Tanah Abang (Maja) →
P Platform floor	Island platform, the doors are opened on the right side
P Platform floor	Line 3	Rail siding or additional lane for train stop

== Services ==
The following is a list of train services at the Citeras Station.

- KRL Commuterline
  - Green Line, towards Tanah Abang and Rangkasbitung

Preceding station	Kereta Api Indonesia	Following station
Rangkasbitung towards Merak	Merak–Tanah Abang	Maja towards Tanah Abang
