= KAI Commuter Rangkasbitung Line =

Commuter rail line in Indonesia

Rangkasbitung Commuter Line Rangkasbitung Line
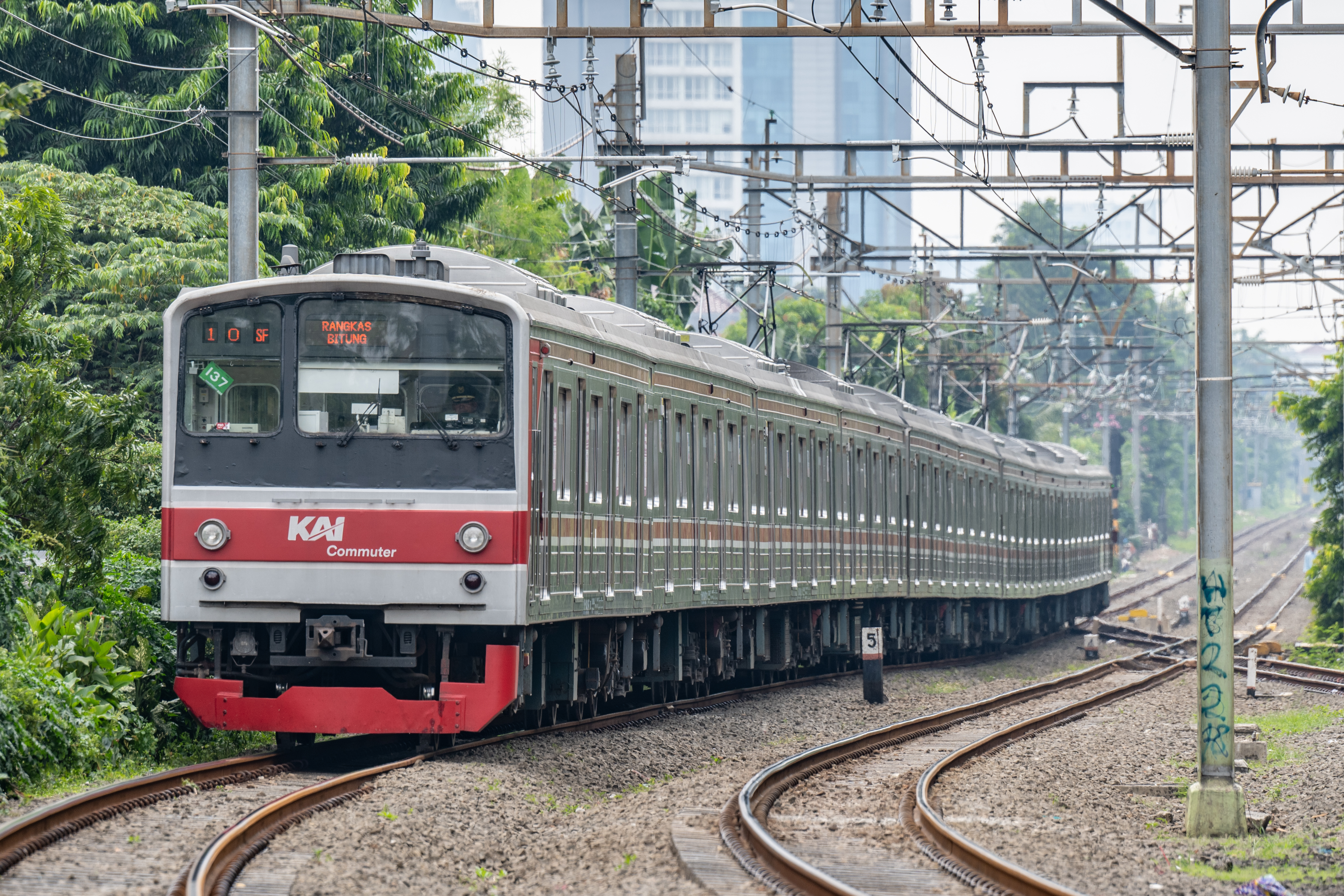
- Ex JR 205 series EMU entering Kebayoran station

Overview
- Status: Operational
- Owner: Kereta Api Indonesia
- Locale: Central Jakarta; South Jakarta; South Tangerang; Tangerang Regency; Bogor Regency; Lebak Regency; Cilegon (planned); Serang (planned)
- Termini: Tanah Abang; Serpong Parung Panjang Tigaraksa Rangkasbitung Serang (planned) Merak (planned)
- Stations: 20
- Website: www.krl.co.id

Service
- Type: Commuter rail
- System: KRL Commuterline
- Services: 4
- Operator: KAI Commuter
- Depot(s): Depok; Bukit Duri; Parung Panjang
- Rolling stock: 205 series Tokyo Metro 6000 series

History
- Opened: 1 October 1899 (track opened); 1992 (electrified to Serpong); 2009 (electrified to Parung Panjang); 5 December 2011 (as 'Green Line'); 2013 (electrified to Maja); 2017 (full electrified)

Technical
- Line length: 72.769 km (45.217 mi)
- Number of tracks: Double-track
- Track gauge: 1,067 mm (3 ft 6 in)
- Electrification: 1,500 V DC overhead line

The Rangkasbitung Line (also known as KRL Commuterline Tanah Abang–Rangkasbitung), officially the Rangkasbitung Commuter Line, is a commuter rail line in Indonesia, operated by PT Kereta Commuter Indonesia (KCI). The line connects Tanah Abang station in Central Jakarta and Rangkasbitung station in Lebak Regency, Banten. On maps and diagrams, the line is shown using the color "green" ( ). Tanah Abang–Rangkasbitung line is the longest and fourth busiest line in the KRL Commuterline system.

== History ==
The line is part of Tanah Abang–Rangkasbitung line, built by the Dutch Public Works Bureau (Burgerlijke Openbare Werken/BOW, now Ministry of Public Works) by decree of the Governor General as stipulated in the State Gazette (Staatsblad) No. 180 dated July 15, 1896. BOW constructed Batavia Zuid–Duri line with branches to Tangerang and Rangkasbitung–Anyer Kidul. The line between Tanah Abang and Rangkasbitung was formally opened on 1 October 1899.

The track between Tanah Abang and Serpong was electrified in 1991 and completed in 1992. In 2009, railway track between Serpong and Parungpanjang has been fully electrified. Tanah Abang–Parungpanjang was the original route of Green Line when it began operation in 2011. Green Line was extended to Maja in 2013. Further extension to Rangkasbitung is operational by 1 April 2017.

Starting in February 2021, all trains starting/ending at Maja station were moved to Tigaraksa station, due to more tracks available at Tigaraksa for idle trains. In June 2025, there were plans to extend the line to Serang and eventually Merak.

== Route patterns ==
There are four main service patterns of the line.

Service pattern	Route	Listed as	Stations served
Tanah Abang–Rangkasbitung	Towards Rangkasbitung: Tanah Abang → Serpong → Parung Panjang → Tigaraksa → Rangkasbitung; Towards Tanah Abang: Rangkasbitung → Tigaraksa → Parung Panjang → Serpong → Tanah Abang	Towards Rangkasbitung: "Rangkasbitung"; Towards Tanah Abang: "Tanah Abang"	8 stations from Tanah Abang to Serpong (bidirectional); 3 stations from Cisauk to Parung Panjang (bidirectional); 4 stations from Cilejit to Tigaraksa (bidirectional); 4 stations from Cikoya to Rangkasbitung (bidirectional)
Tanah Abang–Tigaraksa	Towards Tigaraksa: Tanah Abang → Serpong → Parung Panjang → Tigaraksa; Towards Tanah Abang: Tigaraksa → Parung Panjang → Serpong → Tanah Abang	Towards Tigaraksa: "Tigaraksa"; Towards Tanah Abang: "Tanah Abang"	8 stations from Tanah Abang to Serpong (bidirectional); 3 stations from Cisauk to Parung Panjang (bidirectional); 4 stations from Cilejit to Tigaraksa (bidirectional)
Tanah Abang–Parung Panjang	Towards Rangkasbitung: Tanah Abang → Serpong → Parung Panjang; Towards Tanah Abang: Parung Panjang → Serpong → Tanah Abang	Towards Parung Panjang: "Parung Panjang"; Towards Tanah Abang: "Tanah Abang"	8 stations from Tanah Abang to Serpong (bidirectional); 3 stations from Cisauk to Parung Panjang (bidirectional)
Tanah Abang–Serpong	Towards Serpong: Tanah Abang → Serpong; Towards Tanah Abang: Serpong → Tanah Abang	Towards Serpong: "Serpong"; Towards Tanah Abang: "Tanah Abang"	8 stations from Tanah Abang to Serpong (bidirectional)

== Stations ==
The distance table of Commuterline stations.

Station		Distance (km)		Transfers/ Notes		Location	
Code	Name	From previous station	From Jakarta Termini	Transfers/ Notes		Location	
R01 C10	Tanah Abang	–	0.0	KAI Commuter Cikarang Loop Line	Terminal station. Interchange station to	Central Jakarta	Jakarta
R02	Palmerah	3.191	3.191			Central Jakarta	Jakarta
R03	Kebayoran	3.737	6.928		Kebayoran Velbak	South Jakarta	Jakarta
R04	Pondok Ranji	6.218	13.146		Intrans Bintaro Jaya shuttle bus at St. Pondok Ranji Extension	South Tangerang	Banten
R05	Jurangmangu	2.179	15.325		Intrans Bintaro Jaya shuttle bus at Bintaro XChange	South Tangerang	Banten
R06	Sudimara	1.974	17.299			South Tangerang	Banten
R07	Rawa Buntu	4.566	21.865			South Tangerang	Banten
R08	Serpong	2.413	24.278		Some trains terminate here	South Tangerang	Banten
R09	Cisauk	1.784	26.062		BSD Link shuttle bus at BSD Intermodal Bus Terminal BSD Intermodal Bus Terminal (via skybridge)	Tangerang (regency)	Banten
R10	Cicayur	2.519	28.581			Tangerang (regency)	Banten
R11	Jatake					Tangerang (regency)	Banten
R12	Parung Panjang	5.968	34.549		Some trains terminate here	Bogor (regency)	West Java
R13	Parayasa			Planned		Bogor (regency)	West Java
R14	Cilejit	7.025	41.574			Bogor (regency)	West Java
R15	Daru	2.675	44.249			Tangerang (regency)	Banten
R16	Tenjo	3.902	48.151			Bogor (regency)	West Java
R17	Tigaraksa Podomoro			Planned		Bogor (regency)	West Java
R18	Tigaraksa	2.974	51.125		Some trains terminate here	Tangerang (regency)	Banten
R19	Cikoya	2.651	53.776			Tangerang (regency)	Banten
R20	Maja	1.853	55.629			Lebak	Banten
R21	Citeras					Lebak	Banten
R22 LM01	Rangkasbitung			Merak Commuter Line	Terminal station. Interchange station to Merak Commuter Line	Lebak	Banten

6==Rolling stock==

- Ex-JR East 205 series (2016–present)
- Ex-Tokyo Metro 6000 series (2011–present)

== Incidents and accidents ==
- On 9 December 2013, A former Tokyo Metro 7000 series trainset (no. 7121F) travelling as KA 1131 on this line collided with a Pertamina tanker truck at Bintaro Permai railway intersection, South Jakarta. Seven people (including the three train drivers) were killed in the crash. The trainset was subsequently written-off.

=== Pre-2011 route and services reform ===
- On 19 October 1987, two local passenger trains collided, which causing 139 fatalities and 254 injured. It was caused by human error or a miscommunication between Sudimara and Kebayoran station.
- 18 November 2003, KRL Holec trainset KL2-94202F running KA 396 (Business) on Tanah Abang-Serpong sector of this line caught fire before reaching Kebayoran station, subsequently destroying two frontmost cars of the train. One passenger was killed in this incident.
