= Serpong railway station =

Railway station in Banten, Indonesia

R08 Serpong Station Stasiun Serpong
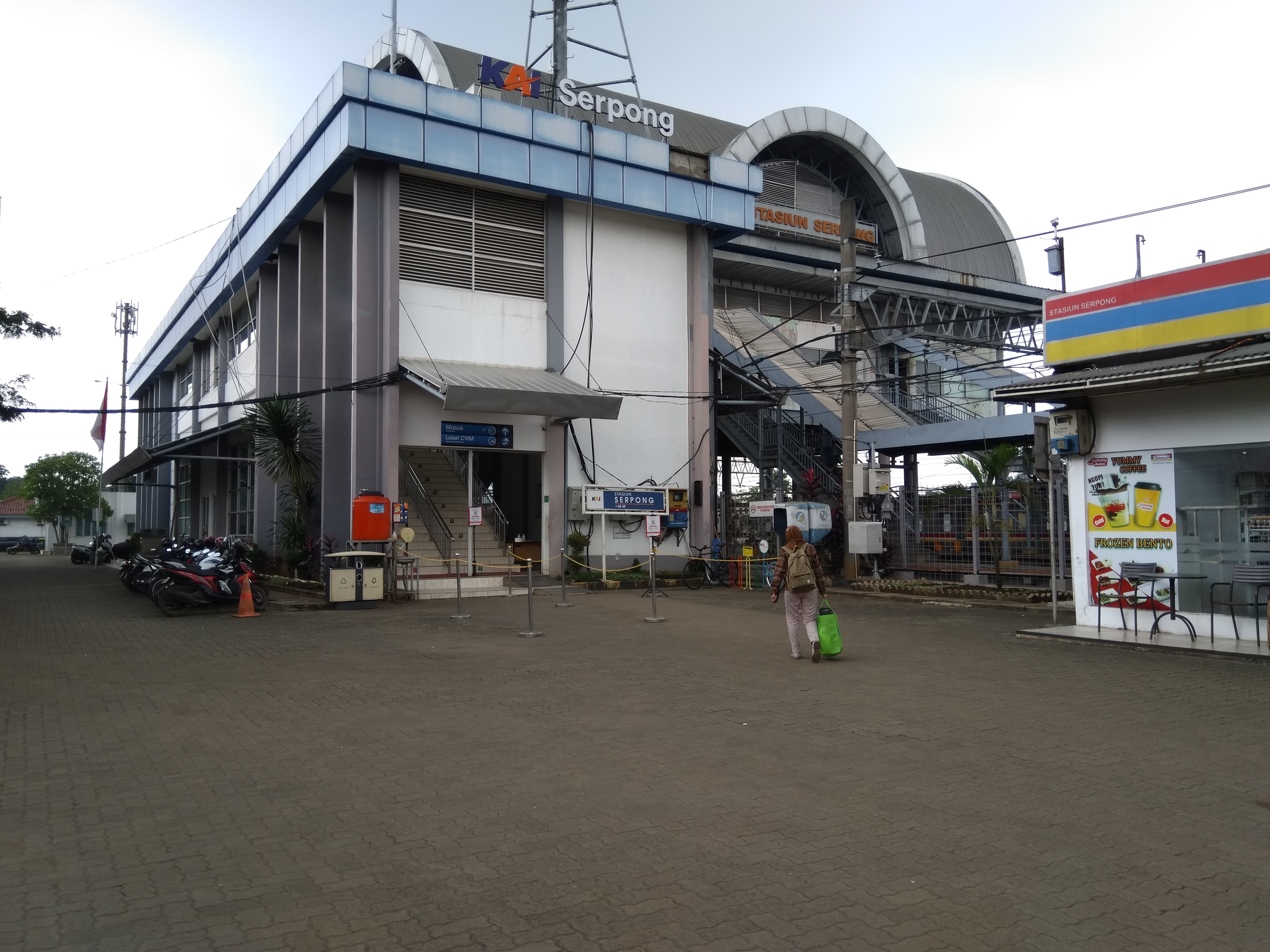
- The frontage of the station

General information
- Location: Jl. Stasiun Serpong, Serpong, South Tangerang; Banten; Indonesia
- Coordinates: 6.3201452°S 106.6651493°E
- Owner: Kereta Api Indonesia
- Operator: KAI Commuter
- Lines: Rangkasbitung Line; Merak–Tanah Abang
- Platforms: 1 side platform 2 island platforms
- Tracks: 4

Construction
- Structure type: Ground
- Parking: Available
- Accessible: Available

Other information
- Station code: SRP • 0211
- Classification: Class I

History
- Opened: 1 October 1889
- Rebuilt: 2006
- Electrified: 1992

Services
Preceding station		Following station
Rawa Buntu towards Tanah Abang	Rangkasbitung Commuter Line	Cisauk towards Rangkasbitung
Location
- Location within Java

Serpong Station (SRP) is a railway station located in Serpong, Serpong, South Tangerang, Banten. It is located not far from Bumi Serpong Damai complex or commonly known as BSD City. This station used to be the terminus for trains in the green line, now the line has been extended to Parung Panjang, Maja and Rangkasbitung. This station mostly served the commuter in Greater Jakarta.

In 1992, the station was electrified to support the Serpong Express KRL journey, which was touted as the forerunner of the Rangkasbitung Line of the KRL Commuterline system. This station was originally served as the terminus for the KRL Commuterline, but has now been extended to Rangkasbitung. Serpong Station is the westernmost train station in South Tangerang City.

== Building and layout ==
Initially, the station had three railway lines with line 2 being a straight line. On 4 July 2007, the new Serpong Station was inaugurated by President Susilo Bambang Yudhoyono as a pilot station, simultaneously with the inauguration of the double track at this station. In addition, the layout of this station has also changed, so that this station has four railroad lines with straight tracks on lines 2 and 3. The old station building, which was a legacy of the Staatsspoorwegen, has been torn down due to the impact of the construction of platforms and new buildings. Nevertheless, passenger activity at this station remains normal. With the completion of the Serpong–Parungpanjang double track as of 17 April 2013, line 2 is made a straight track towards Rangkasbitung, while line 3 is a straight track towards Tanah Abang.

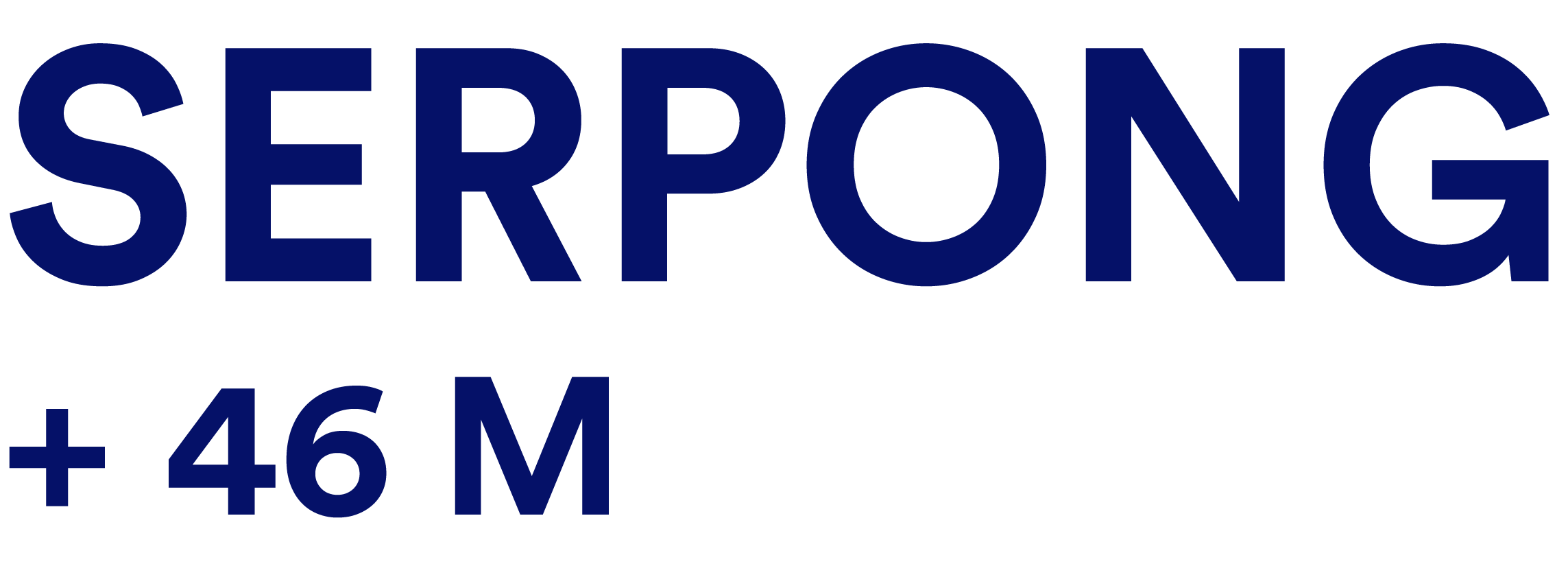
R08
G
Main building
P

Platform floor

Side platform
Line 1
← (Cisauk) Rangkasbitung Line to Rangkasbitung/Tigaraksa and to Tanah Abang (Rawa Buntu) →
Island platform
Line 2
← (Cisauk) Rangkasbitung Line to Rangkasbitung/Tigaraksa
Line 3
Rangkasbitung Line to Tanah Abang (Rawa Buntu) →
Island platform
Line 4
Rangkasbitung Line to Tanah Abang (Rawa Buntu) →

== Services ==
The following is a list of train services at the Serpong Station.

- KRL Commuterline
  - Green Line, towards Tanah Abang (Serpong branch)
  - Green Line, towards Tanah Abang and Parung Panjang (Parung Panjang branch)
  - Green Line, towards Tanah Abang and Maja (Maja branch)
  - Green Line, towards Tanah Abang and Rangkasbitung (Rangkasbitung branch)

== Intermodal support ==
Public transport type	Line	Destination
Angkot	R03A	Serpong Station–Pasar Anyar
Angkot	B07	Serpong Station–Kalideres Terminal (transfer at Kalideres)
Angkot	D16	BSD City–Suradita
Angkot	D20	Serpong Station-Rumpin

== Incidents ==
- On 22 December 2019, The Serpong Station was hit by strong winds and caused the roof of the station flies, power outages and trees near the station toppled. As a result, KRL trips were delayed until the next day.

== Gallery ==
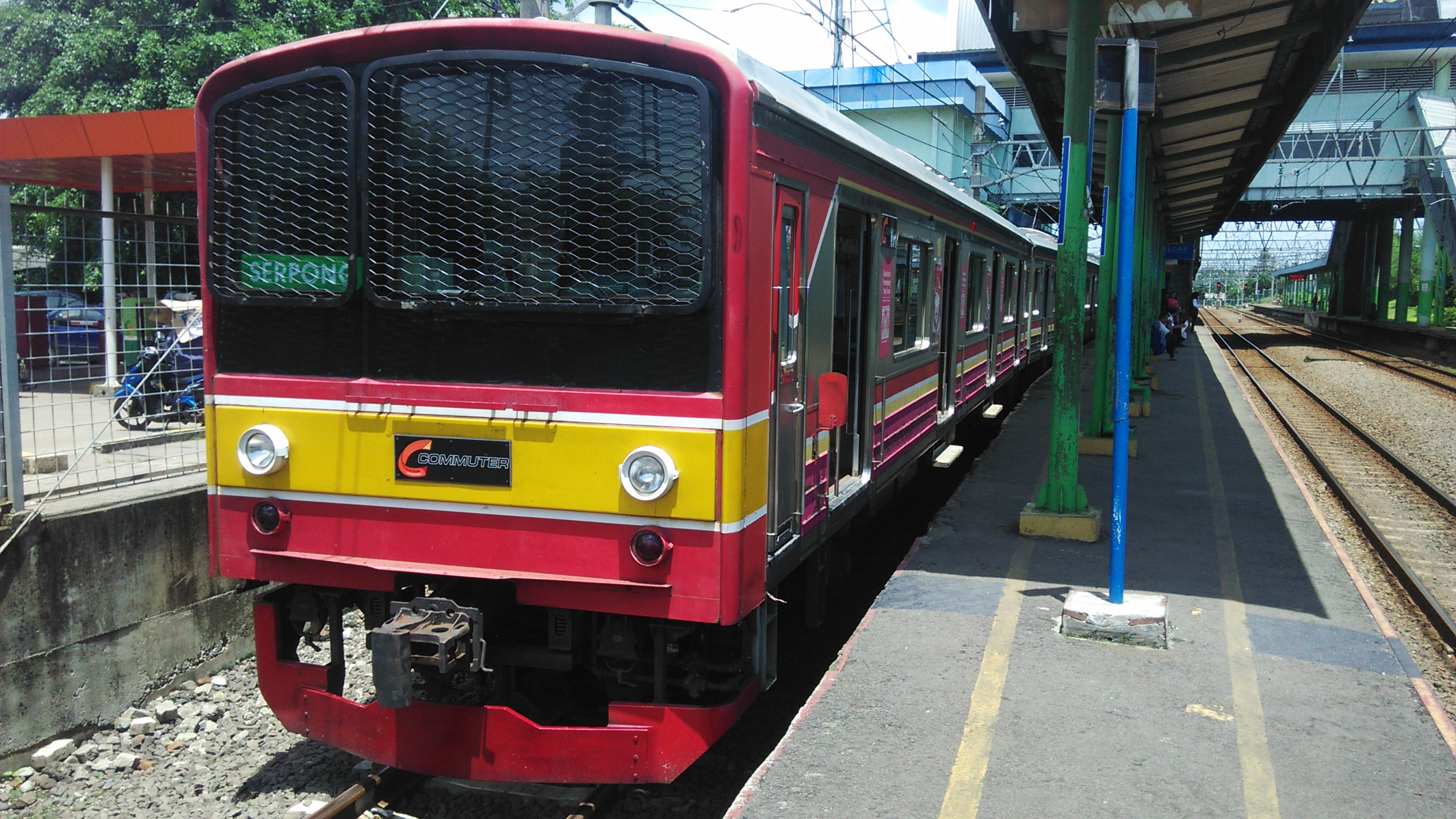
Ex-205 Saikyo Line waiting for departure at Serpong Station, taken on 15 February 2016.

Preceding station	Kereta Api Indonesia	Following station
Cisauk towards Merak	Merak–Tanah Abang	Rawa Buntu towards Tanah Abang
