= Jakarta Kota–Anyer Kidul railway =

Railway line in Indonesia

Jakarta Kota-Anyer Kidul railway

Overview
- Other name: Banten railway
- Status: Operational
- Owner: Directorate General of Railways, Ministry of Transportation of the Republic of Indonesia
- Locale: Jakarta; Banten; West Java
- Termini: Jakarta Kota; Anyer Kidul

Service
- Type: Heavy rail and commuter rail
- Operator(s): Indonesian Railway Company, 1st Operational Area of Jakarta

History
- Opened: 1900

Technical
- Track gauge: 1,067 mm (3 ft 6 in)
- Electrification: 1.5 kV overhead line up to Rangkasbitung

The railway between Jakarta and Anyer Kidul is a railway connecting several places in the province of Banten to Jakarta, the capital city of Indonesia. It was constructed between 1899 and 1900 in the Dutch colonial age, during which it was also known as the Banten railway (Dutch: Bantamlijn).

== History ==
The public railway company Staatsspoorwegen constructed the line in 1899 and 1900 as part of the Western Railways (Dutch: Westerlijnen) to enhance connectivity with western Java.

On 2 January 1899, the first part was opened between Batavia Zuid (Jakarta Kota) and Tangerang. Until 12 September 1923, this line started from Batavia Zuid, headed west across the street via Pasar Pagi (current day Petongkangan street), turned south to Angke after which the railway followed the current route via Duri. Due to the narrow streets downtown, the new railway from 1923 went around the city on partially elevated tracks. The original plan for this included a rail curve starting from Batavia station going east and curving 180° north- and westwards. Because of the higher costs however, the line was to go east to Kampung Bandan after which trains would have to revert onto the new railway going northwest around the old downtown area. This is the situation as it remains today.

The railway stretch from Duri to Rangkasbitung was completed on 1 October 1899, to Serang on 1 July 1900, and the final extension to Anyer Kidul on 20 December 1900.

Part of the railway up to Rangkasbitung is electrified with 1.5 kV overhead lines.

=== Branch lines ===
The following railways branch off the Jakarta Kota-Anyer Kidul mainline:

- Duri-Tangerang railway - opened together with part of the mainline on 2 January 1899.
- Tanah Abang-Kramat railway - opened between 1 March 1904 and 1 August 1922.
- Tanah Abang-Manggarai railway - opened on 1 August 1922.
- Rangkasbitung-Labuan railway - opened on 18 June 1906.
- Krenceng–Merak railway - opened on 1 December 1916.

== Stations ==
The following is a list of stations in order of position on this railway:

- Jakarta Kota
- Kampung Bandan
- Angke
- Duri, with a branch line to Tangerang
- Tanah Abang, with a branch line to Manggarai
- Palmerah
- Kebayoran
- Pondok Betung
- Pondok Ranji
- Jurangmangu
- Sudimara
- Rawa Buntu
- Serpong
- Cisauk
- Cicayur
- Parung Panjang
- Cilejit
- Daru
- Tenjo
- Tigaraksa
- Cikoya
- Maja
- Citeras
- Rangkasbitung with a branch line to Labuhan
- Jambu Baru
- Catang
- Pasirmanggu
- Cikeusal
- Silebu
- Walantaka
- Cihideung
- Kemang
- Serang
- Karangantu
- Banten
- Tonjong Baru
- Pengampelan
- Cilegon
- Krenceng, with a branch line to Merak
- Cigading
- Ciwandan
- Anyer Lor
- Anyer Kidul
