= Maja railway station =

Railway station in Indonesia

R20 Maja Station Stasiun Maja
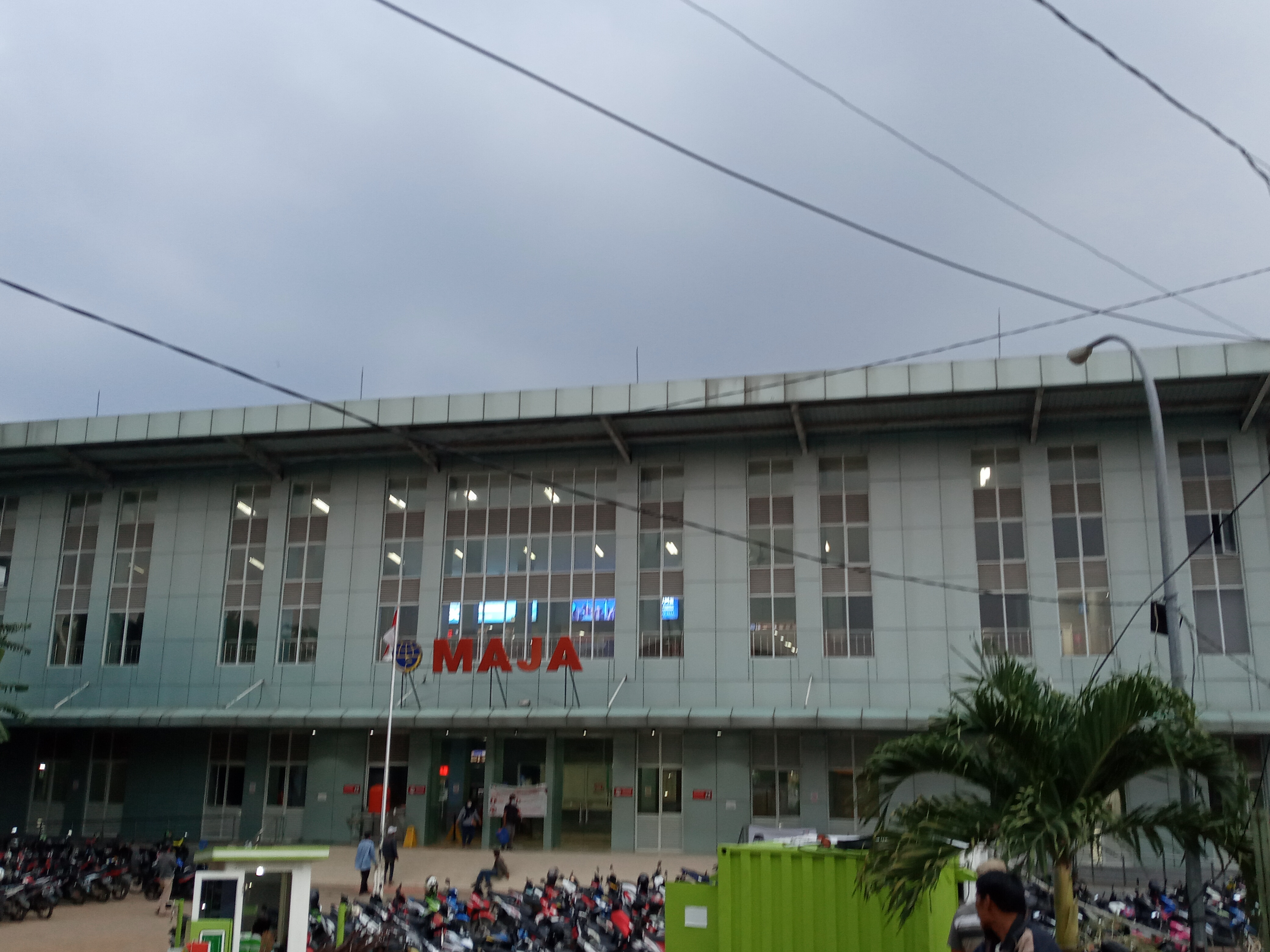
- The front view of Maja Station, as of 24 April 2021.

General information
- Location: Maja, Maja, Lebak Regency; Banten; Indonesia
- Coordinates: 6.332312099999999°S 106.3965612°E
- Elevation: +40 m (130 ft)
- Owner: Kereta Api Indonesia
- Operator: KAI Commuter
- Lines: Rangkasbitung Line; Merak–Tanah Abang
- Platforms: 1 side platform 1 island platform
- Tracks: 3

Construction
- Structure type: Ground
- Parking: Available
- Cycle facilities: Bicycle parking
- Accessible: Available

Other information
- Station code: MJ • 0202
- Classification: Class II

History
- Opened: 1 October 1899
- Electrified: 2012
- Former names: Madja Station

Services
Preceding station		Following station
Cikoya towards Tanah Abang	Rangkasbitung Commuter Line	Citeras towards Rangkasbitung
Location
- Location within Java

Maja Station (MJ) is a class II railway station located in Maja, Maja, Lebak Regency. This station is included in the Operation Area I Jakarta.

Initially, the station is the terminus of electrified tracks system from Tanah Abang Station to Maja Station. Since 17 April 2013, has been serving the KRL Commuterline to the Tanah Abang Station and has been crossed by a double tracks.

Before KCJ (now KAI Commuter) extended its route to Rangkasbitung, the station only served crosses for some time. In order to improve the commuter train services in the Lebak Regency, PT KAI Commuter Jabodetabek (now PT Kereta Commuter Indonesia) then extended the KRL Commuterline route to Rangkasbitung Station. The KRL is run as of 1 April 2017.

== Building and layout ==
In 2014, the station's new building was built by the Directorate General of Railways of the Ministry of Transportation. The new station building has a modern minimalist style which is also applied to Palmerah, Kebayoran and Parungpanjang stations. On 11 May 2016, the new station building was completed replacing the old building to the northwest. In addition, the train line has increased to 3 with line 3 being the new buffer stop.

Initially, the station had two railway lines with line 2 as a straight line. Since the double track plot from Maja–Parung Panjang was operated on 17 December 2015 and the Rangkasbitung–Maja plot was operated on 1 December 2019, the existing line 2 of this station is made a straight track towards Tanah Abang, while line 1 is made a straight track towards Rangkasbitung. This station, since 17 April 2013, has served KRL Commuterline AC to Tanah Abang Station and has been fully crossed by double track on 1 December 2019. Currently, only one KRL Commuterline service stops at this station, namely the Tanah Abang–Rangkasbitung line.

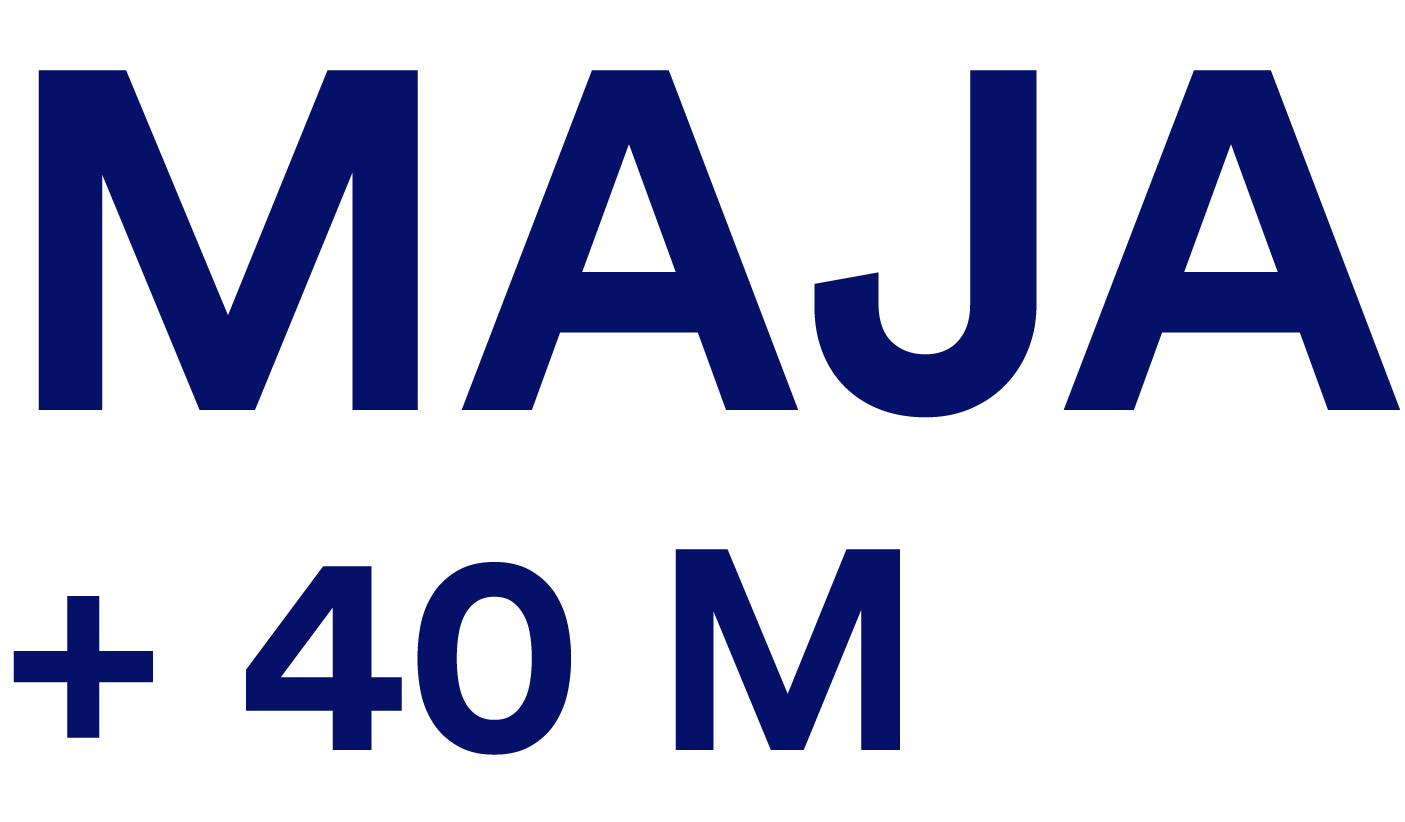
R20
G	Main building
P Platform floor	Side platform, the doors are opened on the right side
P Platform floor	Line 1	← (Citeras) Rangkasbitung Line to Rangkasbitung
P Platform floor	Line 2	Rangkasbitung Line to Tanah Abang (Cikoya) →
P Platform floor	Island platform, the doors are opened on the right side
P Platform floor	Buffer stop or rail siding

== Services ==
The following is a list of train services at the Maja Station.

- KRL Commuterline
  - Green Line, towards Tanah Abang (Maja branch)
  - Green Line, towards Tanah Abang and Rangkasbitung (Rangkasbitung branch)

Preceding station	Kereta Api Indonesia	Following station
Citeras towards Merak	Merak–Tanah Abang	Cikoya towards Tanah Abang
