= Tanah Abang railway station =

Railway station in Indonesia

C10 R01 Tanah Abang Station Stasiun Tanah Abang
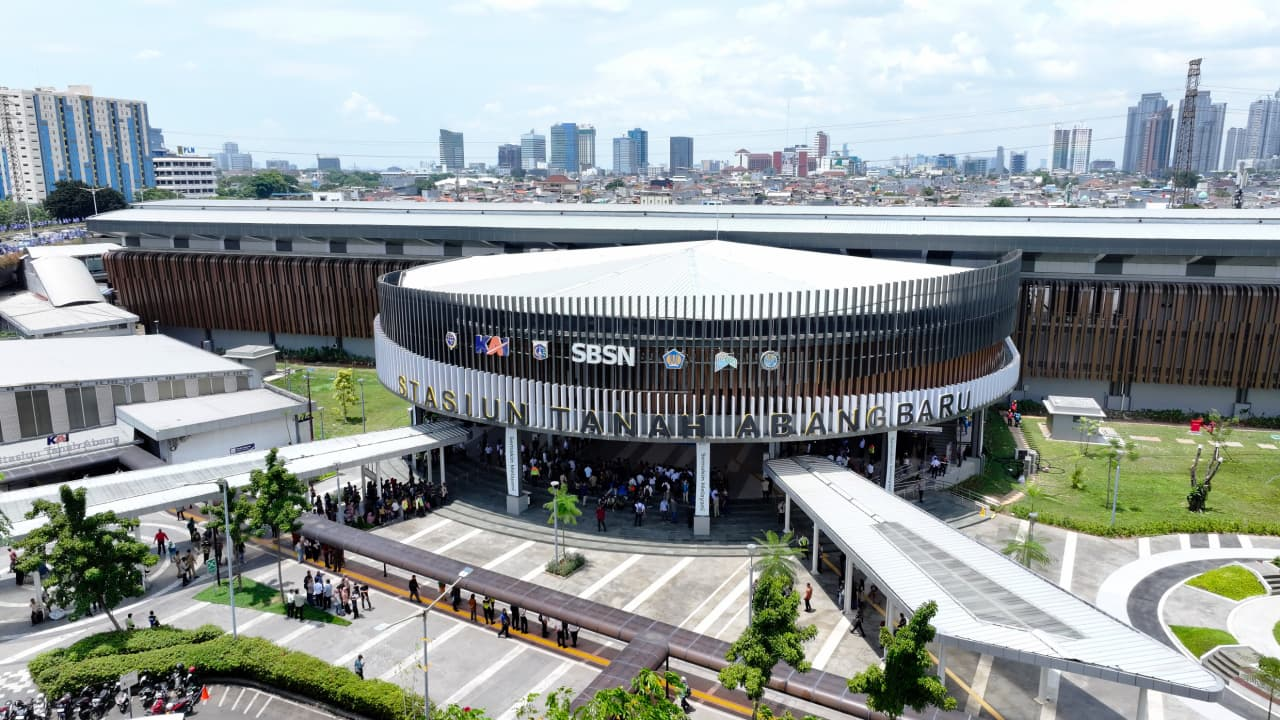
- Front facade of the newly-built north building of Tanah Abang Station, 2025

General information
- Location: Jl. Jatibaru Raya, Kampung Bali, Tanah Abang, Central Jakarta; Indonesia
- Coordinates: 6°11′08″S 106°48′38″E
- Elevation: +9 m (30 ft)
- System: Commuter rail station
- Owner: Kereta Api Indonesia
- Operator: KAI Commuter
- Lines: Cikarang Loop Line; Rangkasbitung Line
- Platforms: 4 island platform
- Tracks: 6

Construction
- Parking: Not Available
- Accessible: Available

Other information
- Station code: THB • 0410
- Classification: Large type A

History
- Opened: 1 October 1899
- Rebuilt: 1995-1997
- Original company: Staatsspoorwegen

Passengers
- 48.000 (daily, 2022)

Services
Preceding station		Following station
Terminus	Rangkasbitung Commuter Line	Palmerah towards Rangkasbitung
Duri towards Angke or Kampung Bandan	Cikarang Commuter Line	BNI City towards Bekasi or Cikarang via Manggarai
Soekarno–Hatta Airport Commuter Line does not stop here
Location
- Location within Jakarta

Tanah Abang Station (THB) is a railway station located in Kampung Bali, Tanah Abang, Central Jakarta, Jakarta, Indonesia. The station located to the east of West Flood Canal, and serves Rangkasbitung and Cikarang Loop lines of KRL Commuterline. The station and the canal are only separated by a small, narrow embankment and as such, Tanah Abang station is prone to flooding, especially during the heavy rain season.

Tanah Abang station serves as the terminus for KRL Rangkasbitung Line (also known as Green Line or Serpong Line). It used to serve some intercity services, but after the Green Line extension to Rangkasbitung, all local train services towards Merak use Rangkasbitung station as their terminus, therefore local train services do not stop in Tanah Abang station anymore.

This station, alongside Duri, serves as transit stations for the only train services towards South Tangerang and Tangerang, both in Banten. As commuters from these two satellite cities need to change train here before going to other places in Jakarta, these two stations tend to be crowded especially in rush hour. Due to the rising occupancy volume of Tanah Abang Station, a major expansion has been carried out by constructing an entirely new building to the northeast of the existing one, at the former site of a locomotive depot. The expansion work was started on 30 April 2023, and was completed in 2025.

== History ==
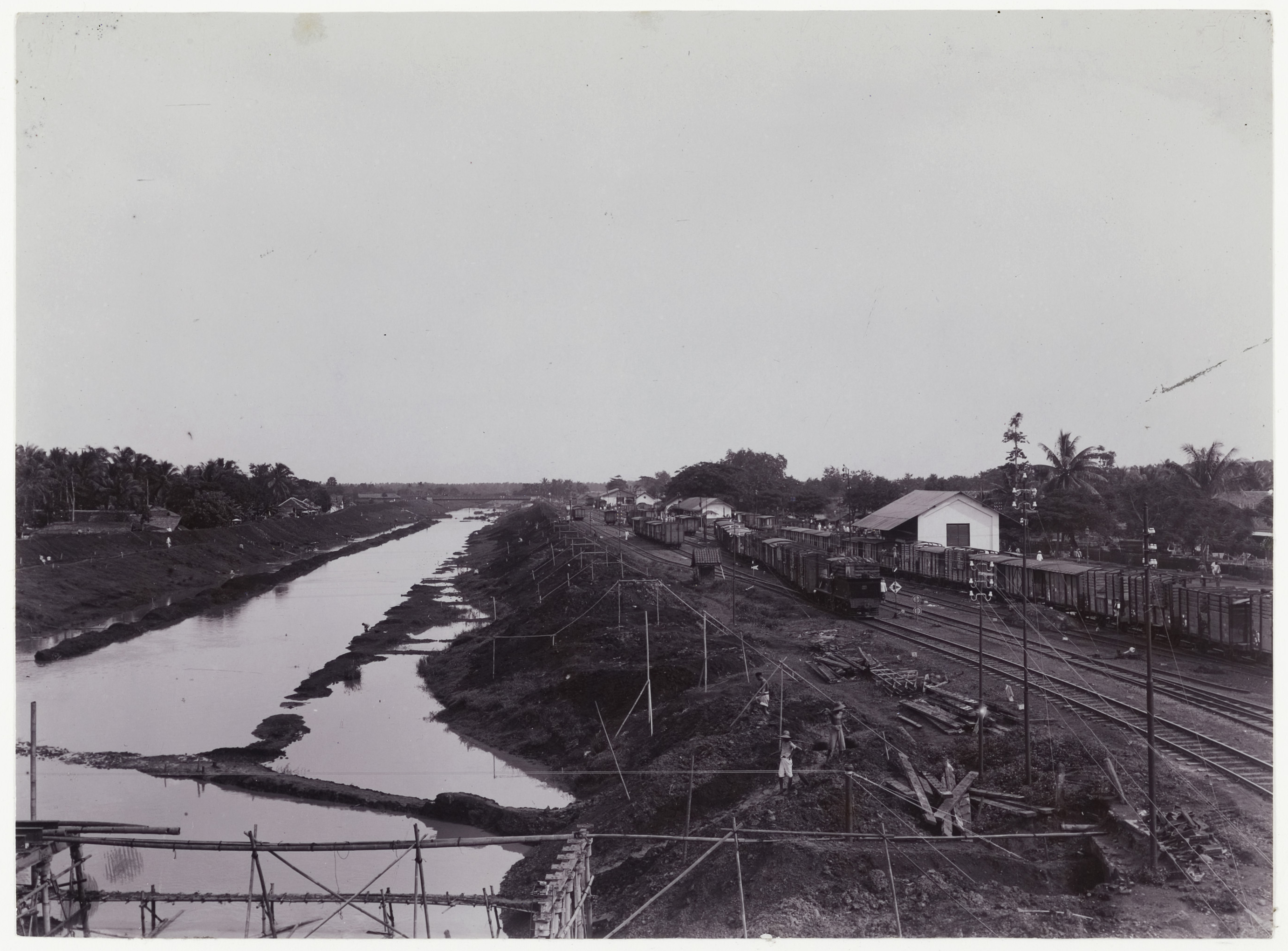
Tanah Abang Station when it was still managed by the Staatsspoorwegen c. 1910

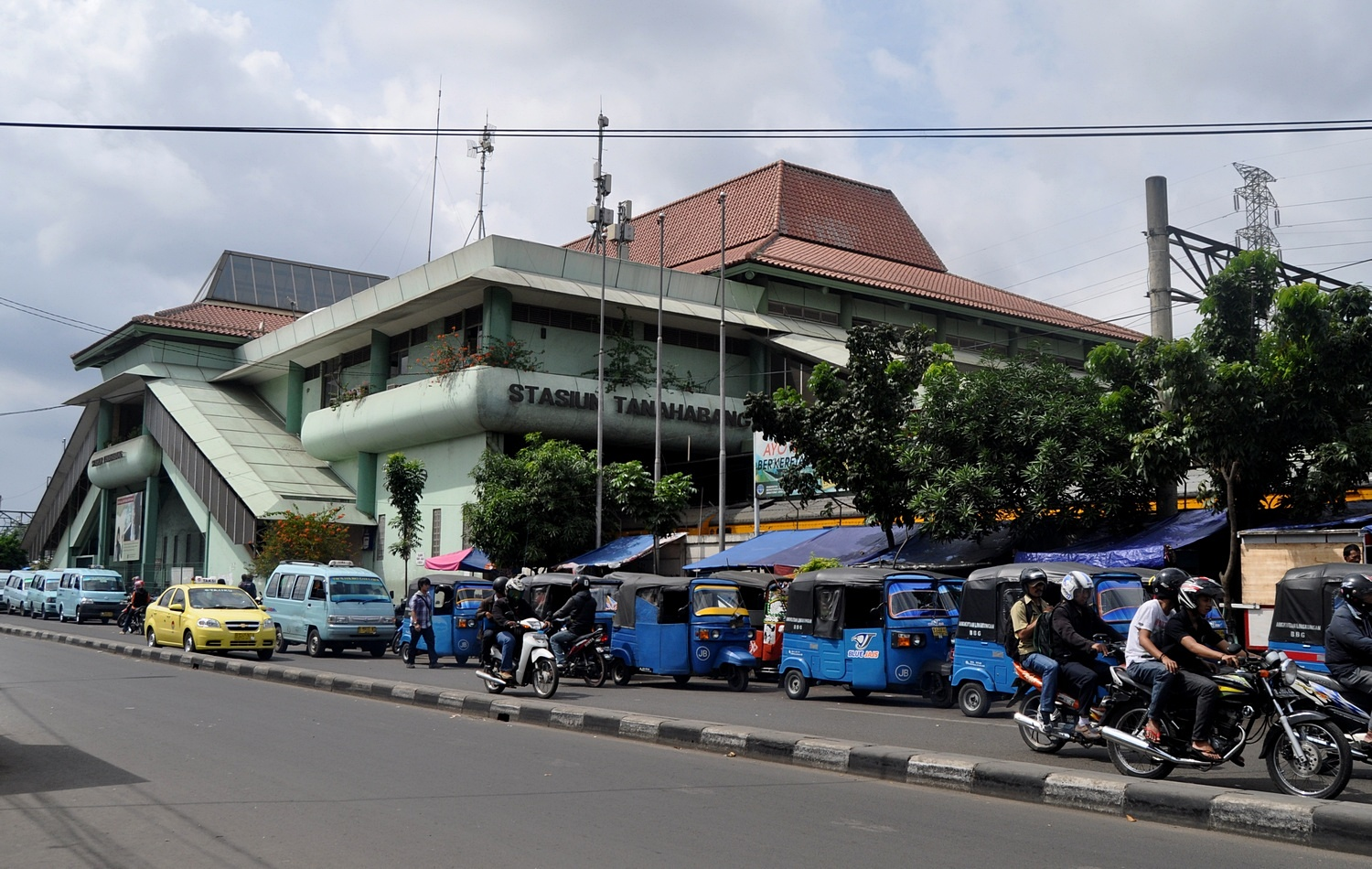
The current existing south building of Tanah Abang station since 1997. Photo was taken on 5 January 2011, prior to the Tanah Abang skybridge construction, where the front facade was still visible

The history of Tanah Abang station was date back from 1899 railway line, Jakarta–Anyer Kidul. The first segment, Jakarta–Tanah Abang–Rangkasbetung (currently Rangkasbitung) was opened on 1 October 1899 according to State Railway Company of the Dutch East Indies' 1921, 1925 and 1932 Annual Report.

The original station building has been demolished and replaced with the present two-story building, which is equipped with a crossing bridge and escalators. This new building was inaugurated on 3 June 1997 by the then Minister of Transportation, Haryanto Dhanutirto. It was made to accommodate KRL Commuterline passengers, which at that time were already operating on the Tanah Abang–Serpong route.

Until 2022, Tanah Abang Station had a locomotive depot located 500 metres (1,600 ft) northeast of the emplacement, which was directly connected to line 1. It used to store two derelict locomotives of BB304 class and BB306 class each and two freight cars.

In 2017, a new entrance and exit building located close to the Tanah Abang Locomotive Depot to the north was opened. The new entrance and exit building is also equipped with various new amenities, such as commercials. The north entrance have been integrated with the pedestrian bridge which faces Jalan Jatibaru Bengkel, as well as the skybridge that connects the station with Tanah Abang Market. In order to create a new public transportation intermodal integration, the north entrance area was overhauled between May and June 2020, by creating a new public plaza for supporting transportation intermodal shelters for Transjakarta buses, angkot and mikrolet, and online motorcycle taxis (ojek online).

In late 2022, the Ministry of Transportation revealed the plan for Tanah Abang Station extension; it is planned that the new building will be built on a 4 hectares site located 500 m north from the existing building, namely the Tanah Abang Locomotive Depot. The extension plan was carried out due to Tanah Abang Station has become one of the busiest transit stations on the KRL Commuterline system (with 48,000 daily ridership and 150,000 transit passengers) and such expansion is very necessary. Starting on 25 December 2022 all locomotives, EMU Helpers, and Inspection Trains (KAIS) at the Tanah Abang Locomotive Depot were moved to the Cipinang Locomotive Depot in East Jakarta. Indeed, it has been a long time since the Jakarta Provincial Government, the Ministry of Transportation, and PT KAI have planned to build a new Tanah Abang Station building, carrying the concept of transit-oriented development (TOD). Apart from the station, apartments will also be built like those at Tanjung Barat and Pondok Cina.

After the depot demolition completed, the abandoned BB304 and BB306 locomotives remained at site until they were scrapped on 13 March 2023. Eventually on 30 April 2023, the physical construction of the new station building begun, marked with the groundbreaking ceremony attended by the Minister of Transportation Budi Karya Sumadi, Acting Governor of Jakarta Heru Budi Hartono, and the President Director of Kereta Api Indonesia Didiek Hartantyo. It is expected that the capacity will be extended from 100,000 to 300,000 daily passengers. It is also estimated that the first phase of the station's extension and developments will cost IDR 380.93 billion. The surrounding area of the station will be redeveloped into an integrated TOD. On 29 June 2025, the new north building was opened to the public, and was later inaugurated by President Prabowo Subianto on 4 November.

== Building and layout ==
Tanah Abang Station consist of two buildings, the existing south building and the new north building. The current two-storey south building since 1997, replacing the original one from 1899, has a mixed architecture between traditional and modernism, with the roof designed to resemble the Javanese traditional house, Joglo. The north building, opened in 2025, has a circluar-shaped front lobby area and adhere to contemporary eco-friendly architecture with wooden elements on the front facade.

The station has six railway lines. Line 2 is a straight double track heading to Duri–Kampung Bandan, line 3 is a straight double track going to Sudirman–Manggarai, and line 5 is a single straight track going to Rangkasbitung–Merak. After the opening of the Tanah Abang–Serpong segment double-track on 4 July 2007, the layout was overhauled so that the number of lines increased from five to six, with line 5 being a double track straight from Rangkasbitung-Merak and line 6 being a straight line in the direction of Rangkasbitung–Merak.

On 22 February 2025, the Cikarang Loop Line bound to Angke station began to serve the new platform 1 on the north building. The island platform for the Cikarang line cater trains bound to Bekasi through Manggarai while the tracks on the other side are removed.

C10 R01
P Platform floor	Line 6	← (Palmerah) Rangkasbitung Line to Rangkasbitung
P Platform floor	Island platform
P Platform floor	Line 5	← Turning tracks →
P Platform floor	Line 5	← (Palmerah) Rangkasbitung Line to Rangkasbitung
P Platform floor	Line 4	← Turning tracks for shunting →
P Platform floor	Line 3	Straight tracks to Manggarai
P Platform floor	Line 3	End line of the Rangkasbitung Line →
P Platform floor	Island platform
P Platform floor	Line 2	← (BNI City) Cikarang Loop Line (counterclockwise loop) to Cikarang
P Platform floor	Island platform
P Platform floor	Line 1	Straight tracks to Kampung Bandan
P Platform floor	Line 1	Cikarang Loop Line (clockwise loop) towards Kampung Bandan (Duri) →
	Side platform
G	Main building, connected with the skybridge

== Services ==
=== Passenger services ===
- KAI Commuter
  - Cikarang Loop Line (Full Racket)
    - to Cikarang (counter-clockwise via Manggarai)
    - to Cikarang (clockwise via Duri and Kampung Bandan)
  - Cikarang Loop Line (Half Racket), to Angke/Kampung Bandan (via Duri) and Cikarang
  - Rangkasbitung Line, to Serpong, Parungpanjang, Tigaraksa, and Rangkasbitung

=== Defunct services ===
- Loop Line, to Bogor, Nambo, Jatinegara (Replaced by Cikarang Loop Line)
- Kalimaya intercity (Merak-Tanah Abang) closed 1 April 2017
- Patas Merak intercity (Merak-Angke via Tanah Abang) closed 1 April 2017
- Rangkas Jaya intercity (Tanah Abang-Rangkasbitung) closed 1 April 2017
- Krakatau intercity (Merak-Kediri via Tanah Abang) closed 17 July 2017. The service now only serves Pasar Senen–Blitar route and renamed Singosari

== Supporting transportation ==
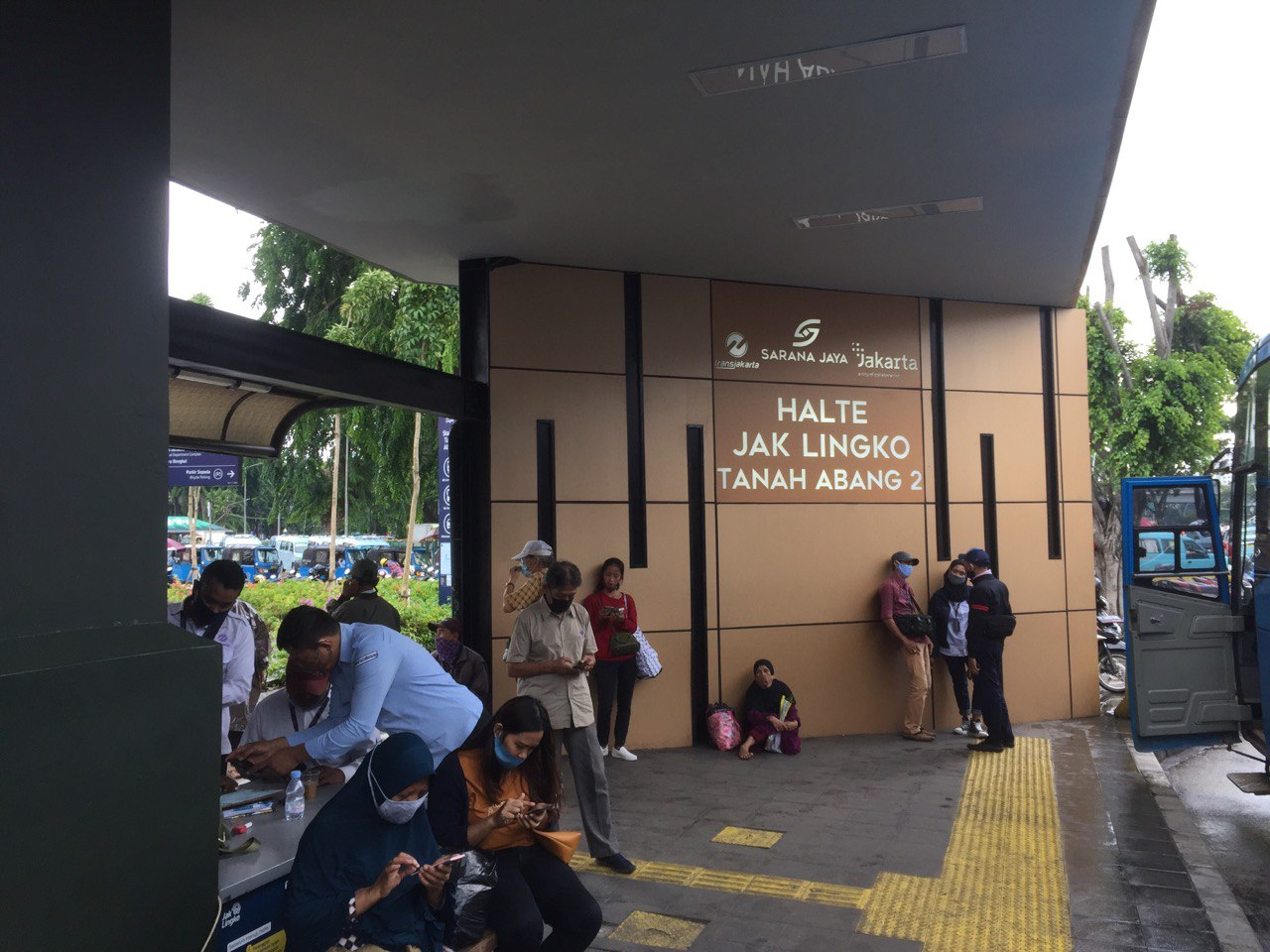
A new bus shelter for Transjakarta's Mikrotrans Jak Lingko feeder services at Tanah Abang Station.

The north entrance of Tanah Abang station was overhauled between May and June 2020 to create a new transit plaza for supporting transportation modes such as Transjakarta, mikrolet, and auto rickshaws (bajaj).

Type	Route	Destination
Transjakarta	1H (MetroTrans)	Tanah Abang-Gondangdia
Transjakarta	1R (MetroTrans EV)	Tanah Abang-Pasar Senen Station
Transjakarta	5M (MetroTrans)	Tanah Abang-Kampung Melayu (via Cikini Raya–Matraman Raya)
Transjakarta	8C (MetroTrans)	Tanah Abang-Pasar Kebayoran Lama
Transjakarta	8M (Non BRT)	Tanah Abang-Tanjung Duren
Transjakarta	9D (Non BRT)	Tanah Abang-Pasar Minggu
Transjakarta	JAK 7 (MikroTrans Jak Lingko)	Stasiun Tanah Abang–Grogol bus terminal
Transjakarta	JAK 8 (MikroTrans Jak Lingko)	ITC Roxy Mas–Bendungan Hilir market
Transjakarta	JAK 9 (MikroTrans Jak Lingko)	ITC Roxy Mas-Karet Tengsin
Transjakarta	JAK 10 (MikroTrans Jak Lingko)	Tanah Abang-Jakarta Kota (via Ir. H. Juanda–Pecenongan Raya)
Transjakarta	JAK 11 (MikroTrans Jak Lingko)	Tanah Abang-Kebayoran (via Rawa Belong)
Transjakarta	JAK 12 (MikroTrans Jak Lingko)	Tanah Abang-Kebayoran (via Pos Pengumben)
Transjakarta	JAK 13 (MikroTrans Jak Lingko)	Tanah Abang-Jakarta Kota (via Cideng Barat–K.H. Moh. Mansyur)
JAK 14 (MikroTrans Jak Lingko)	Tanah Abang-Pasar Lokbin Meruya Ilir	
JR Connexion (Perum DAMRI)	x10	Tanah Abang-Bogor Station
Regular Transjabodetabek	AC70A Mayasari Bakti	Cileungsi-Tanah Abang
Regular Transjabodetabek	Sinar Jaya	Ciawi, Bogor-Tanah Abang
Regular Transjabodetabek	AC52 Mayasari Bakti	Bekasi bus terminal-Stasiun Tanah Abang
Regular Transjabodetabek	AC52A Mayasari Bakti	Jatiasih, Bekasi-Tanah Abang
Mikrolet	JB03	Stasiun Tanah Abang–Tomang
Mikrolet	M08	Tanah Abang–Jakarta Kota
Mikrolet	M09	Tanah Abang–Kebayoran (via Jalan Letjen Supeno)
Mikrolet	M09A	Stasiun Tanah Abang–Kebayoran (via Jalan Pos Pengumben)
Mikrolet	M10	Tanah Abang–Pasar Jembatan Lima
Mikrolet	M11	Tanah Abang–Pasar Lokbin Meruya Ilir

== Places of interest ==
- Textile Museum (Jakarta)
- Tanah Abang Market

== Incidents ==
- On 2 February 2007, there was a flood that inundated Tanah Abang Station. As a result, the KRL Commuterline's travel route was disrupted.
- On 10 February 2007 at 08:47, economy-class train numbered 906 with the route Tanah Abang–Rangkasbitung was dropped when the train was about to depart from Tanah Abang Station. The incident happened because the train signaling system was not functioning properly due to the massive floods that hit Jakarta a few weeks earlier.
- On 31 October 2008 at 09:55, 3 coal train cars with the number Gapeka 2012 derailed at Tanah Abang Station. This incident was most likely caused by the driver's negligence when braking the train on the switch.
- On 17 January 2013, the Tanah Abang station was totally paralysed by a massive flood that hits Jakarta. As the result, KRL Commuterline services were disrupted.

== Gallery ==
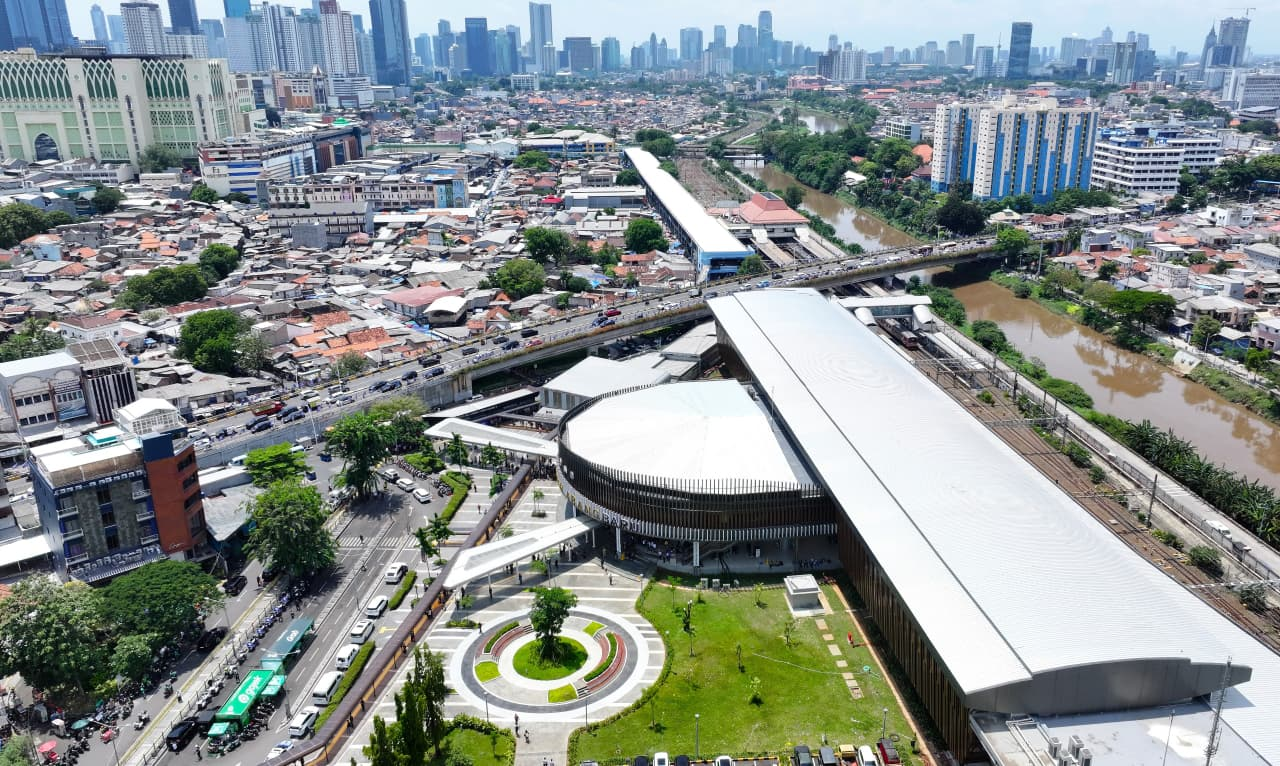
Bird-eye view of the Tanah Abang station complex, 2025

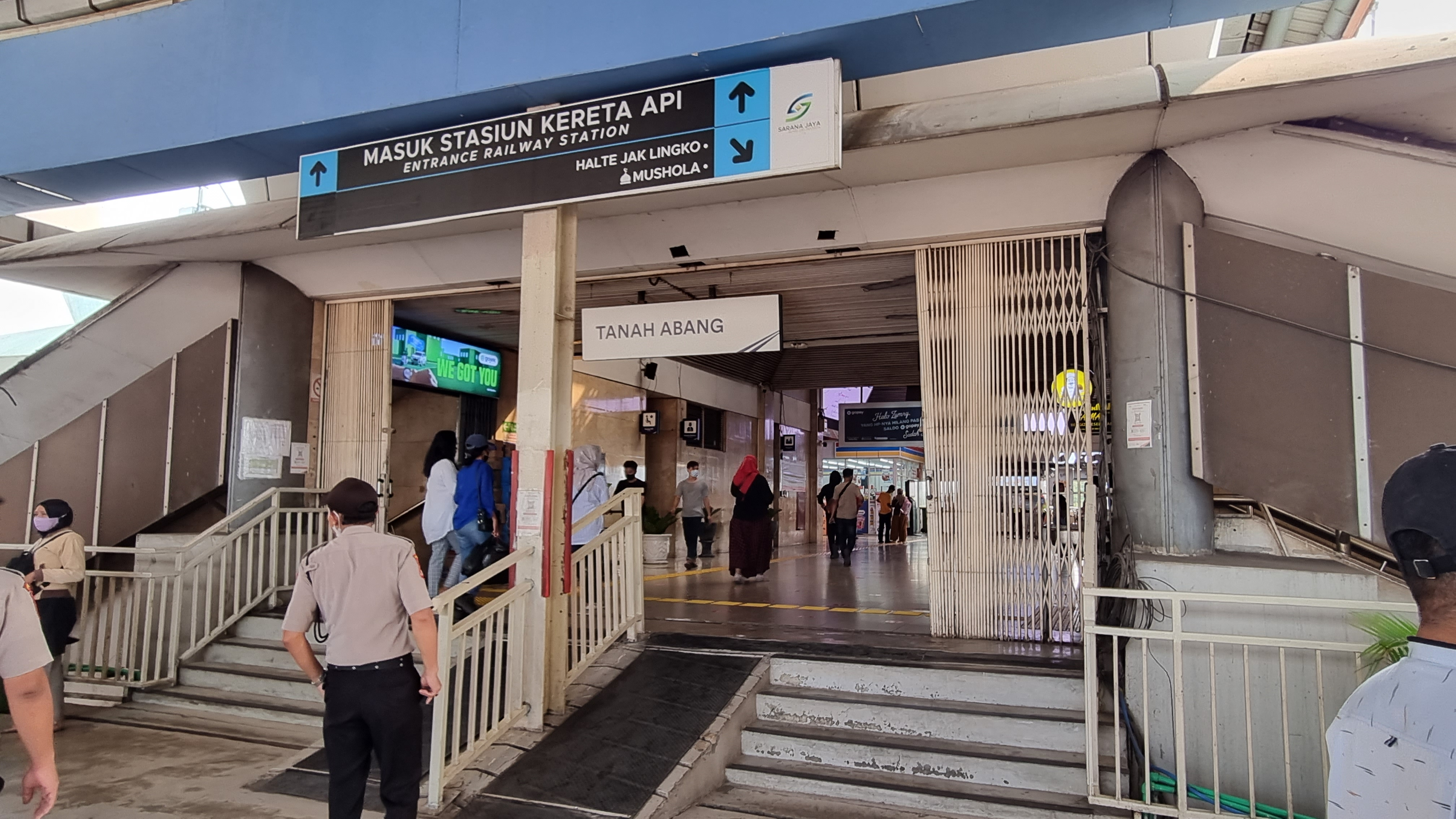
The Tanah Abang station south building entrance from the Tanah Abang skybridge, 2022

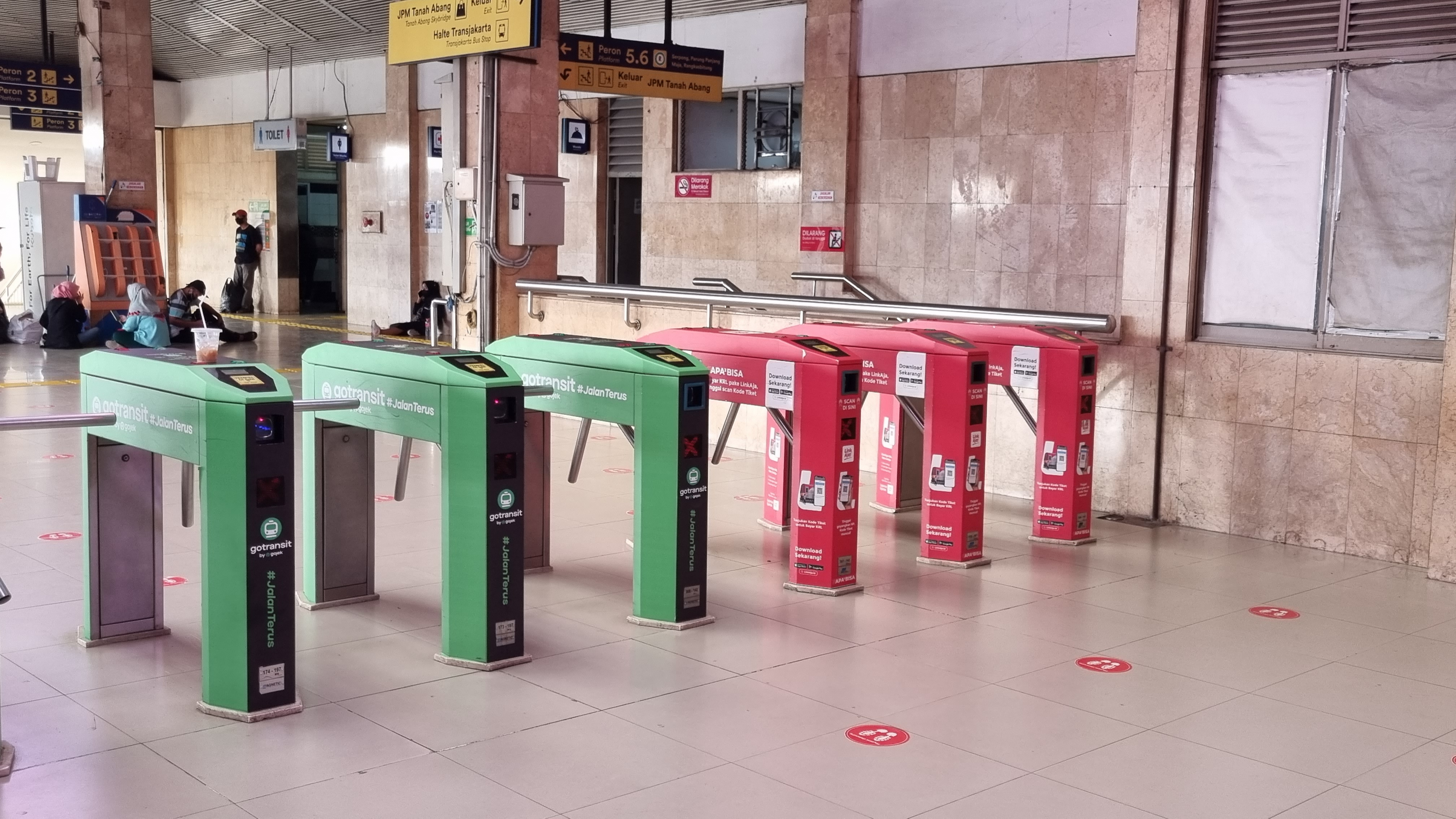
Fare gates of the station, 2022

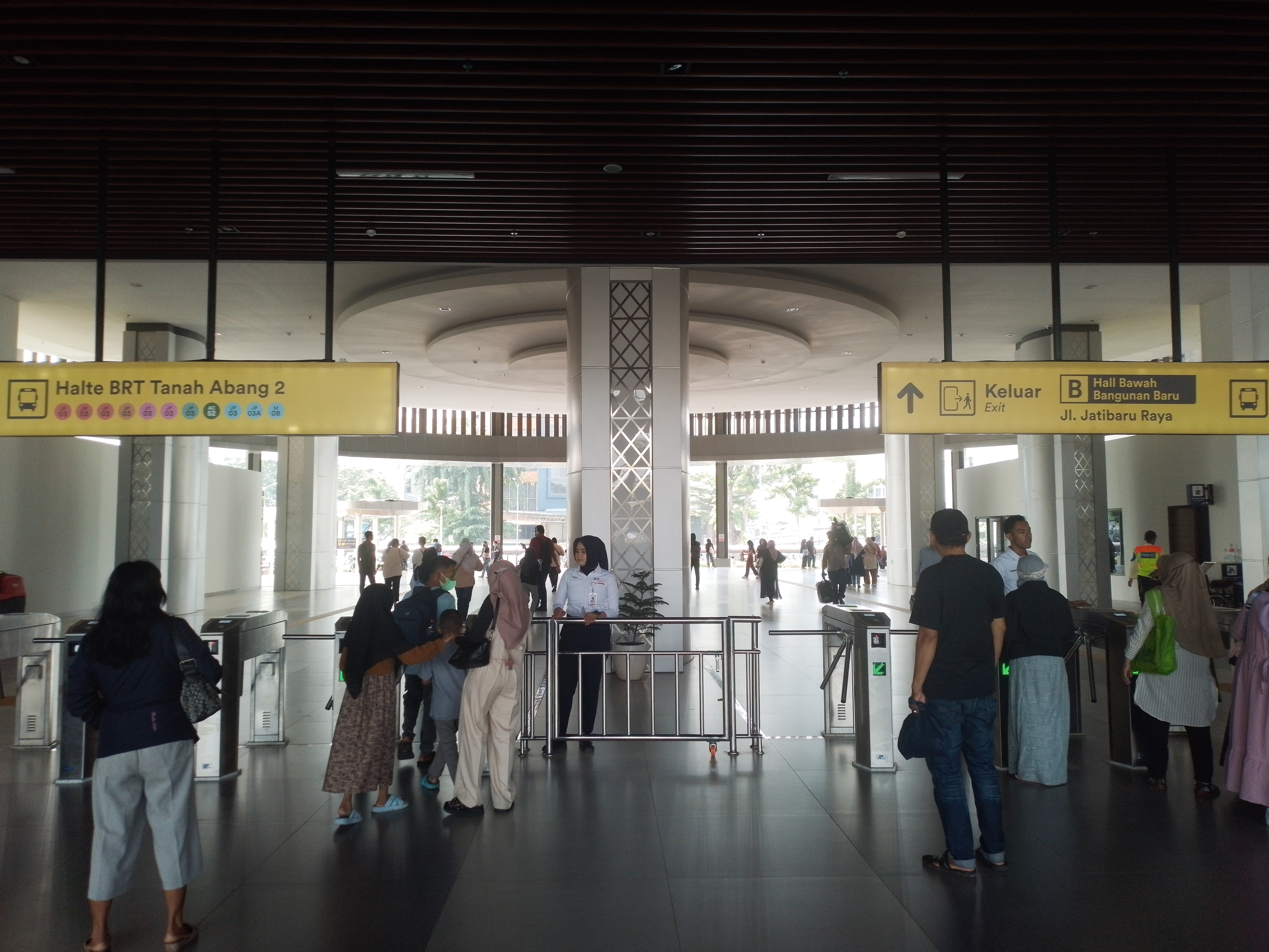
Exit gate to the lobby of the newly-built north building, 2025

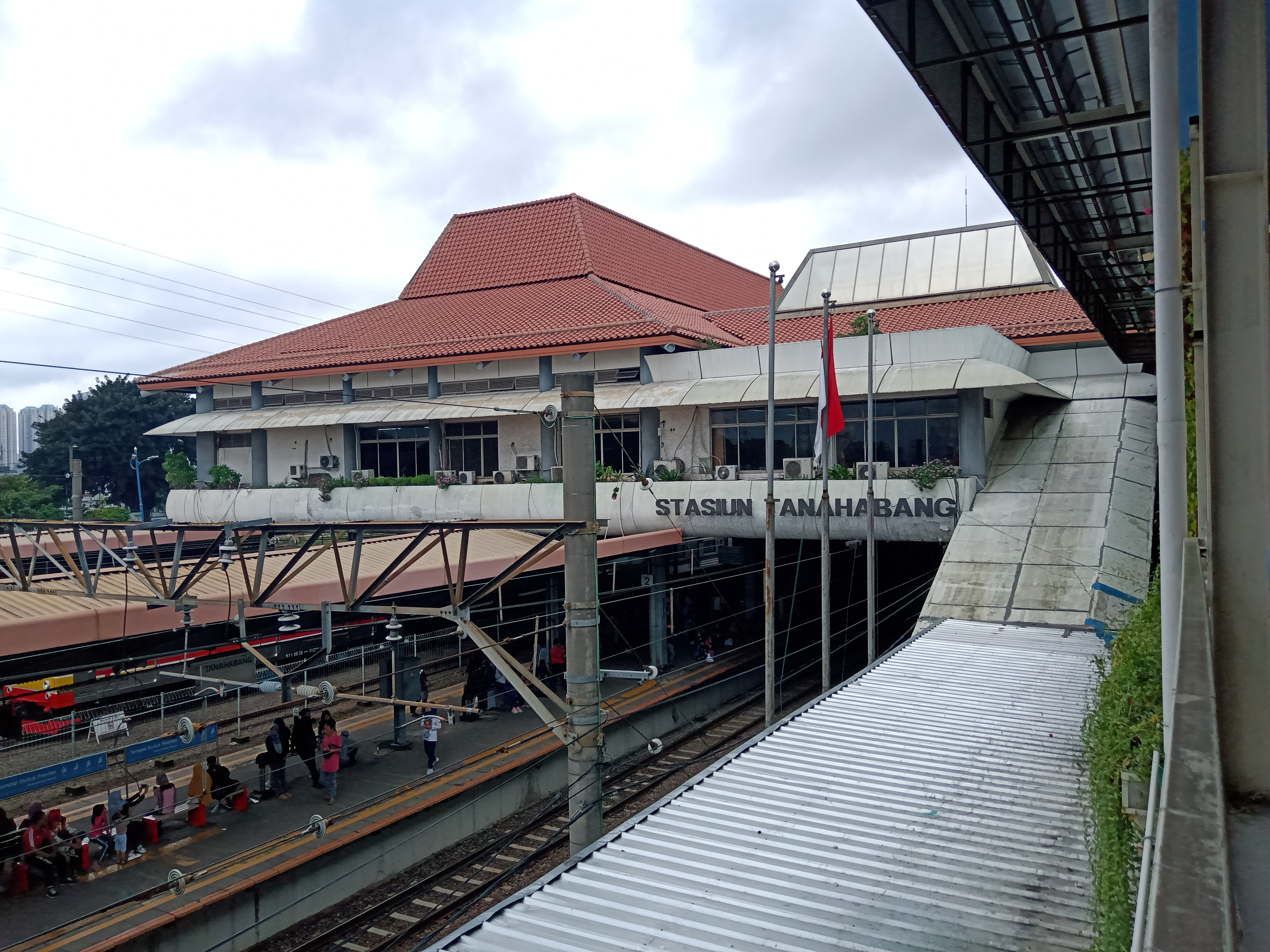
The emplacement of the south building, 2020

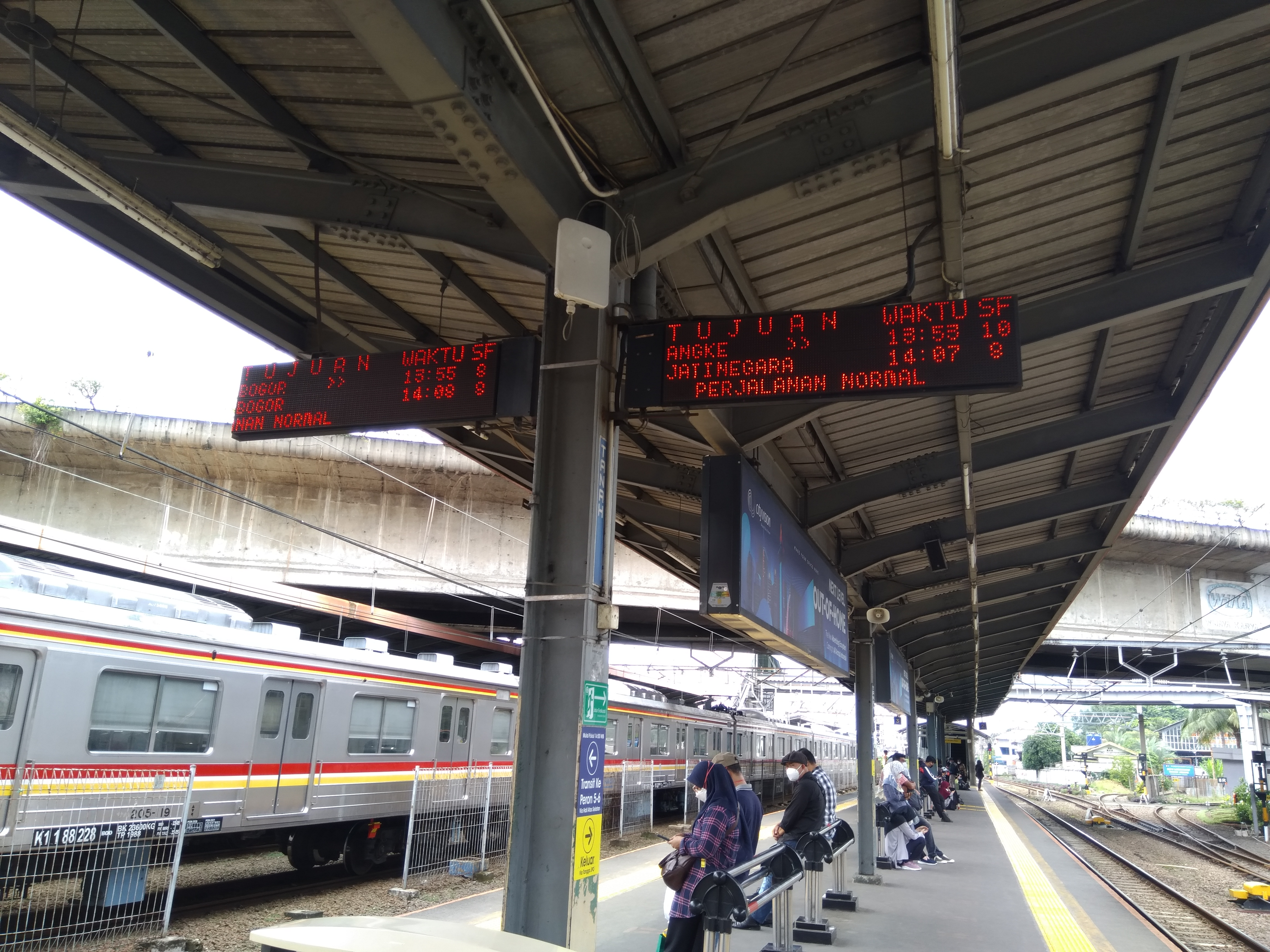
Passenger Information System on the platform canopy, 2022
