= Bintaro train crash =

Bintaro train crash may refer to:

- 1987 Bintaro train crash
- 2013 Bintaro train crash
