= Ebiet G. Ade =

Indonesian singer-songwriter and guitarist

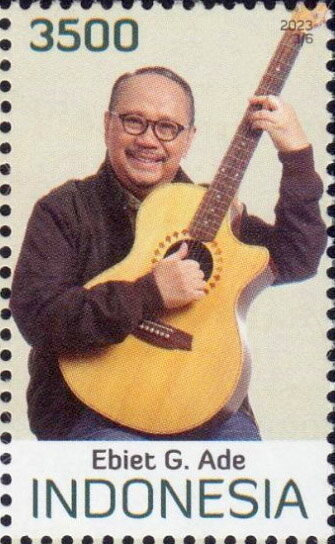
- Ade on a 2023 stamp of Indonesia
- Born: Abid Ghoffar; 21 April 1954 (age 72); Wanadadi, Banjarnegara, Central Java, Indonesia
- Other names: Ebiet G Ade, H. Abid Ghoffar
- Occupations: Singer; songwriter; guitarist
- Musical career
- Genres: Pop; ballad; folk; country; jazz
- Instruments: Vocal; guitar
- Years active: 1979–present
- Label: Musica Studios
- Website: ebietgade.com

Abid Ghoffar bin Aboe Dja’far, better known as Ebiet G. Ade (born 21 April 1954), is an Indonesian singer-songwriter and guitarist of Javanese descent.

== Early life ==
Ebiet G. Ade was born in Wonodadi, Banjarnegara, Central Java, on 21 April 1954, the youngest of six children of Aboe Dja'far (1917–1985) and Saodah (1919–1997). He lived in Yogyakarta since elementary school. During high school, he joined Pelajar Islam Indonesia. In 1971, he associated with artists Yogyakarta, including Emha Ainun Nadjib. He was interested in poetry and wanted to be a poet. However, he was unable to read poems properly. He instead sang his poems after adding melodies.

== Musical career ==
=== Albums ===
In 1979, he released his first studio album, Camellia I. His voice is similar to Jose Feliciano, Glen Campbell, Roy Orbison, John Lennon, Paul McCartney, John Denver, Tonny Koeswoyo, Yon Koeswoyo and Said Effendi. Notable songs from this album were "Lagu untuk Sebuah Nama" ("Song for a Name"), "Pesta" ("Party") and "Camellia". The album was sold more than 2 million copies.

In 1995, Kupu-Kupu Kertas (Paper Butterflies) was released. In this album, Ebiet was helped by his fellow musicians, including Billy J. Budiardjo, Erwin Gutawa, Ian Antono and Purwacaraka. Rock music is dominant in this album.

In 2007, he released In Love: 25th Anniversary which was dedicated to his wife of 25 years. The album was released by Trinity Optima Production. During production, he was helped by Anto Hoed and his children. There are 15 singles from album Camellia I to Camellia 4 on this album.

=== Singles ===
Most of Ebiet's songs are about disaster. In June 1978, Ebiet wrote "Berita Kepada Kawan" ("News for a Friend") after a poisonous gas disaster in Dieng Plateau. In 1981, he wrote "Sebuah Tragedi 1981" ("A Tragedy, 1981") regarding the sinking of KMP Tampomas II in the Masalembu Islands. After 1982 Galunggung eruption, he wrote "Untuk Kita Renungkan" ("For Us to Think About"), while the 1987 Bintaro train crash inspired him to write "Masih Ada Waktu" ("There is Still Time").

Another theme of his songs is love, such as in "Lagu Untuk Sebuah Nama", "Elegi Esok Pagi" ("Elegy for Tomorrow") and "Cinta di Kereta Biru Malam" ("Love on the Blue Night Train"), which is about a romantic relationship with a girl on a train.

=== Awards ===
Rolling Stone Indonesia put his name into 50 Greatest Indonesian Singers.

== Personal life ==
He married Yayuk Sugianto (Koespudji Rahayu) in 1982. They have 4 children together, Abietyasakti Ksatria Kinasih, Aderaprabu Hantip Trengginas, Byatriasa Pakarti Linuwih and Segara Banyu Bening.

== Discography ==
- Camellia I (1979)
- Camellia II (1979)
- Camellia III (1980)
- Camellia 4 (1980)
- Langkah Berikutnya (1982)
- Tokoh-Tokoh (1982)
- 1984 (1984)
- Zaman (1985)
- Isyu! (1986)
- Menjaring Matahari (1987)
- Sketsa Rembulan Emas (1989)
- Seraut Wajah (1991)
- Kupu-Kupu Kertas (1995)
- Cinta Sebening Embun (1995)
- Aku Ingin Pulang (1996)
- Gamelan (1998)
- Balada Sinetron Cinta (2000)
- Bahasa Langit (2001)
- In Love: 25th Anniversary (2007)
- Masih Ada Waktu (2008)
- Serenade (2013)

== Bibliography ==
- Ginting, Asrat; et al. (2009). Musisiku [My Musician] (in Indonesian). Jakarta: Republika. ISBN 978-979-1102-52-0. OCLC 227000099.
