= Jurangmangu railway station =

Railway station in Indonesia

R05 Jurangmangu Station Stasiun Jurangmangu
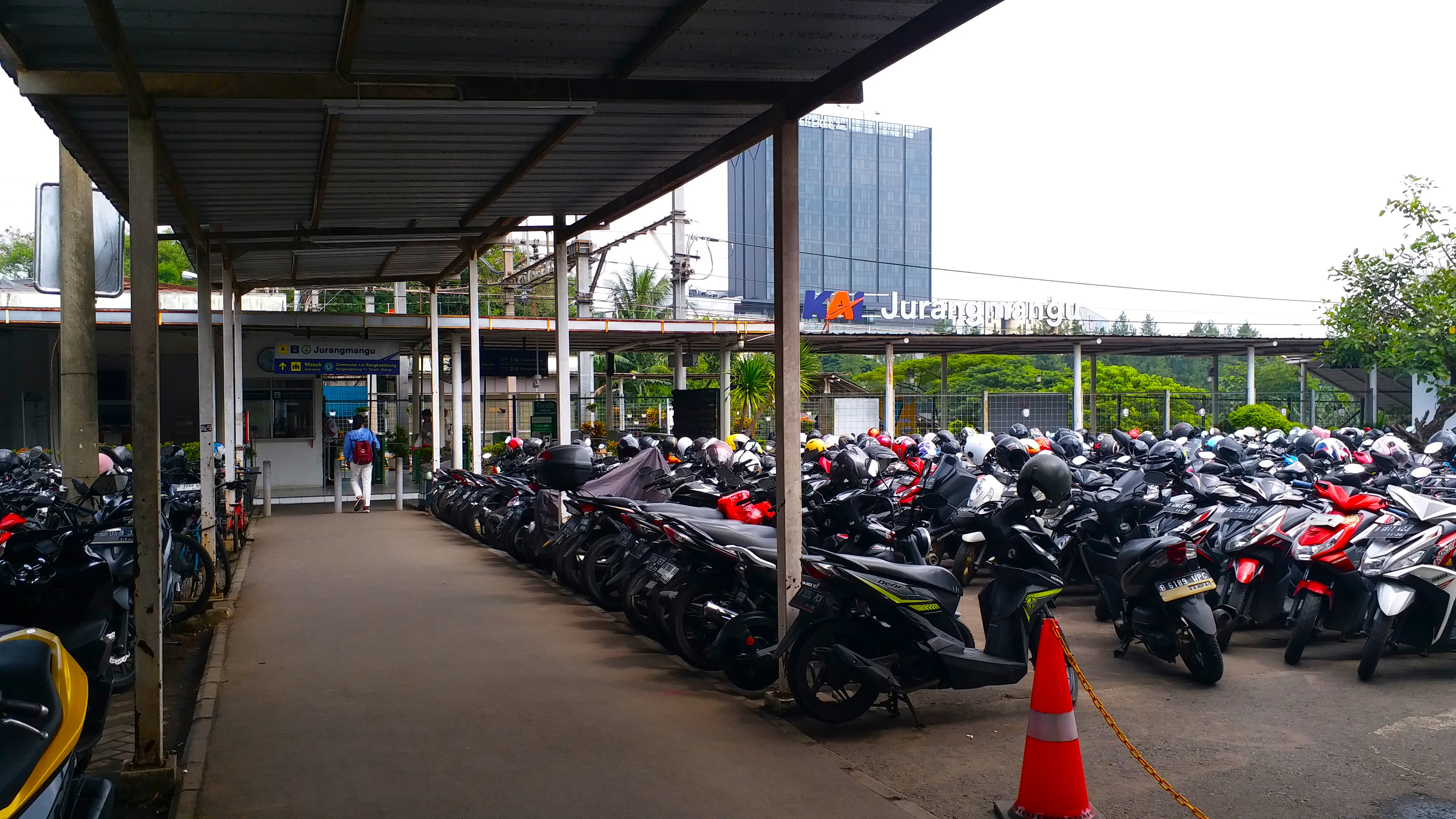
- Jurangmangu Station, Photo was taken on 12 March 2019

General information
- Location: Jl. Cenderawasih, Sawah Lama, Ciputat, South Tangerang; Banten; Indonesia
- Coordinates: 6.288612°S 106.729154°E
- Elevation: +25 m (82 ft)
- Owner: Kereta Api Indonesia
- Operator: KAI Commuter
- Lines: Rangkasbitung Line; Merak–Tanah Abang
- Platforms: 2 side platforms
- Tracks: 2

Construction
- Structure type: Ground
- Parking: Available
- Cycle facilities: Bicycle parking
- Accessible: Yes

Other information
- Station code: JMG
- Classification: Class III

History
- Opened: 1 October 1899; Reopened 16 September 2009
- Rebuilt: 2002

Services
Preceding station		Following station
Pondok Ranji towards Tanah Abang	Rangkasbitung Commuter Line	Sudimara towards Rangkasbitung
Location
- Location within Java

Jurangmangu Station (JMG) is a class III railway station located in Sawah Lama, Ciputat, South Tangerang. The station is located at an elevation of +25 meters above sea level and is included in Operation Area I Jakarta. Even though it is called Jurangmangu, this station is not located in Jurangmangu Village, Pondok Aren District, but is located in the south of Jurangmangu village itself.

Jurangmangu is one of two stations serving the Bintaro Jaya housing area, along with Pondok Ranji, located about 2 kilometers northeast. It is also located near the Bintaro XChange mall. To access this station, passengers pass under the Ulujami–Serpong Toll Road (from the direction of Bintaro Jaya Xchange Mall (Bintaro Xchange)) or via Cenderawasih Street. When walking towards the station, there is a park located in a valley near this station.

== History ==
In order to enhance passenger mobility from Batavia to Rangkasbitung and Banten, in the 1890s the Staatsspoorwegen company built a railroad line and its stations (including Jurangmangu Station) that connected the Duri Station to Rangkasbitung, passing through Tanah Abang. This project was completed on 1 October 1899, and regular trains serving the route were immediately started. At first, this station was a small railway stop, but eventually it was closed sometime in the 1980s due to low occupancy.

Jurangmangu station was reopened on 16 September 2009 by Jusman Syafii Djamal as Minister of Transportation of Indonesia at that time. The operation of this station is carried out in order to increase the occupancy of KRL Commuterline passengers on the Tanah Abang – Parungpanjang route. This is because previously the distance between KRL stations was quite far, so it was necessary to have a station that could be accessed by local residents.

In December 2023, a pedestrian tunnel connecting the station and Bintaro XChange mall was opened, passing beneath the Ulujami–Serpong Toll Road. Jurangmangu station itself was renovated in 2024, and was reinaugurated by Transportation Minister Budi Karya Sumadi on 12 October 2024.

== Station layout ==
This station has two railway tracks. Line 1 is a straight track to Tanah Abang, while line 2 is a straight track to Rangkasbitung.

R05 Jurangmangu
Platform floor	Side platform, the doors are opened on the right side	
Platform floor	Line 2	← (Sudimara) Rangkasbitung Line to Serpong/Tigaraksa/Rangkasbitung
Platform floor	Line 1	Rangkasbitung Line to Tanah Abang (Pondok Ranji) →
Platform floor	Side platform, the doors are opened on the right side	
G	Main building	

== Services ==
The following is a list of train services at the Jurangmangu Station.

- KRL Commuterline
  - Green Line, towards Tanah Abang and Serpong (Serpong branch)
  - Green Line, towards Tanah Abang and Parung Panjang (Parung Panjang branch)
  - Green Line, towards Tanah Abang and Maja (Maja branch)
  - Green Line, towards Tanah Abang and Rangkasbitung (Rangkasbitung branch)

== Intermodal support ==
Public transport type	Line	Destination
Transjakarta	S31 (Royaltrans premium service)	Bintaro XChange Mall–Fatmawati Indomaret MRT station
JR Connexion	Trans Bintaro Jaya	Bintaro XChange Mall–FX Sudirman (via Pondok Indah Mall)
Shuttle bus	Intrans Bintaro Jaya	Jurangmangu–Kebayoran, Jurangmangu–Discovery/Emerald, Jurangmangu–CBD Bintaro
Angkot	D10	Ciputat–Pasar Ceger

Preceding station	Kereta Api Indonesia	Following station
Sudimara towards Merak	Merak–Tanah Abang	Pondok Ranji towards Tanah Abang
