= Sudimara railway station =

Railway station in Indonesia

R06 Sudimara Station Stasiun Sudimara
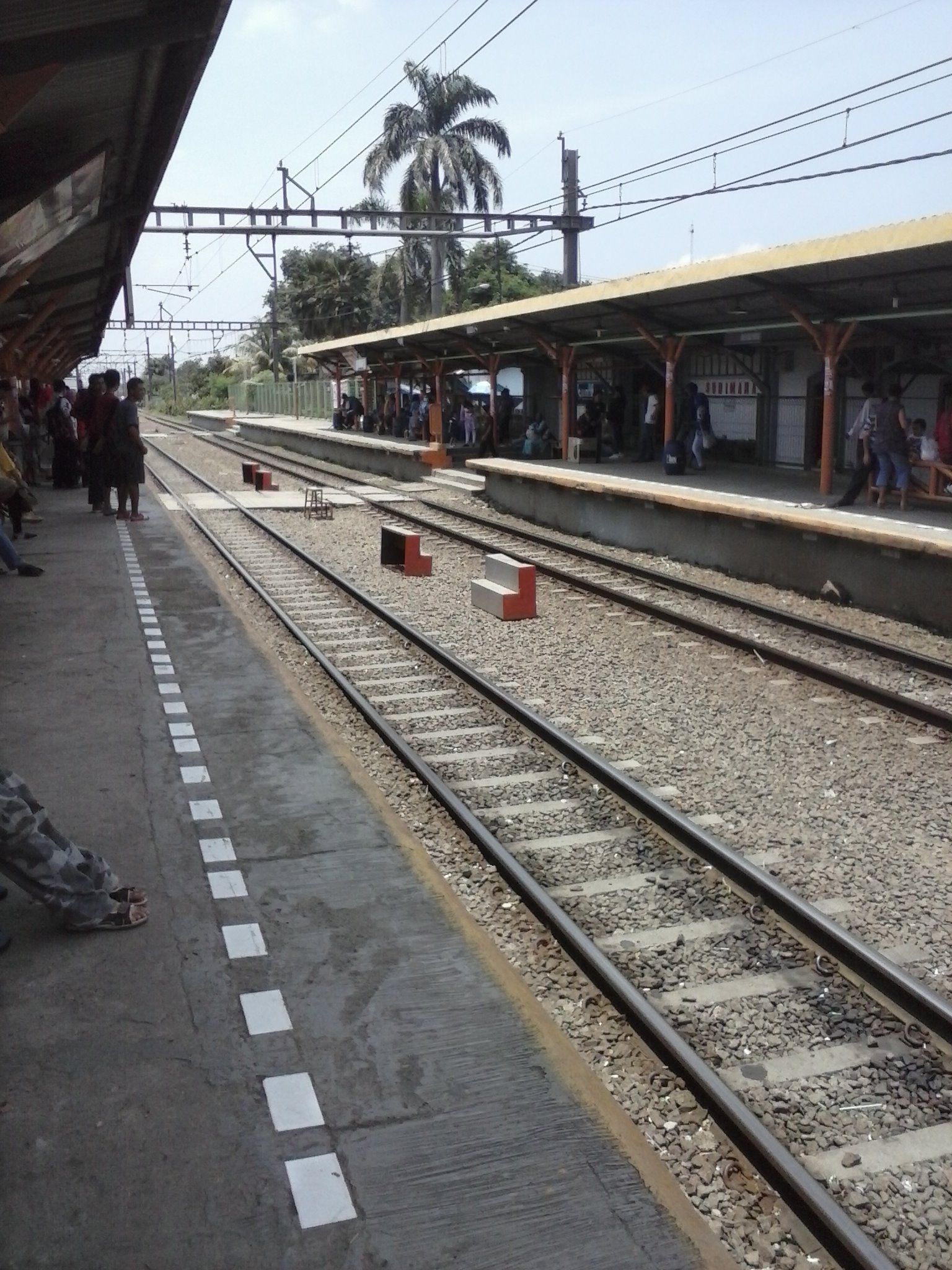
- Platform of Sudimara Station, photo was taken on 19 March 2013.

General information
- Location: Jombang, Ciputat, South Tangerang; Banten; Indonesia
- Coordinates: 6.29672°S 106.713°E
- Elevation: +26 m (85 ft)
- Owner: Kereta Api Indonesia
- Operator: KAI Commuter
- Lines: Rangkasbitung Line; Merak–Tanah Abang
- Platforms: 1 island platform 2 side platforms
- Tracks: 3

Construction
- Structure type: Ground
- Parking: Available
- Accessible: Available

Other information
- Station code: SDM
- Classification: Class II

History
- Opened: 1 October 1889

Services
Preceding station		Following station
Jurangmangu towards Tanah Abang	Rangkasbitung Commuter Line	Rawa Buntu towards Rangkasbitung
Location
- Location within Java

Sudimara Station (SDM) is a class II railway station located in Jombang, Ciputat, South Tangerang. The station, which is located at an altitude of +26 m, is included in the Operation Area I Jakarta, and is located between Jurangmangu Station and Rawa Buntu Station.

== History ==
In order to enhance passenger mobility from Batavia to Rangkasbitung and Banten, in the 1890s the Staatsspoorwegen company built a railroad line and its stations (including Sudimara Station in 1921) that connected the Duri Station to Rangkasbitung, passing through Tanah Abang. This project was completed in 1899, and regular trains serving the route were immediately started.

== Building and layout ==
Initially, there were 4 lines at Sudimara Station, with line 2 as a straight track. Lines 2 and 3 were usually used for train traffic and crossings, while line 1 is sometimes used for storing or stabling a series of freight cars, where this 1st line also has a railroad switch (leading to Rawa Buntu) which leads to a dead end or buffer stop. As well as there was also a buffer stop which is a dead end in the station building, its position is to the right of line 1 from the direction of Jurangmangu Station. The two buffer stops were also used to store freight carriages.

It is estimated that in the early 1990s, the rails at Sudimara Station were changed to only 3 lines. Also, the positions of the railroad switches were changed and other lines were dismantled.

In the early 2000s, Sudimara Station had a total of 3 lines, with line 1 (as a straight track) and line 2 (as a turn track) used for passing and crossing, and line 3 used for overtaking trains. Since the operation of the double track on the Tanah Abang–Serpong railway as of 4 July 2007, the layout of this station has been overhauled by adding line 2 as a new straight line. The old station building which is a legacy of the Staatsspoorwegen is still being maintained and the Train dispatcher room (PPKA) which is also part of the old station building is still in use today.

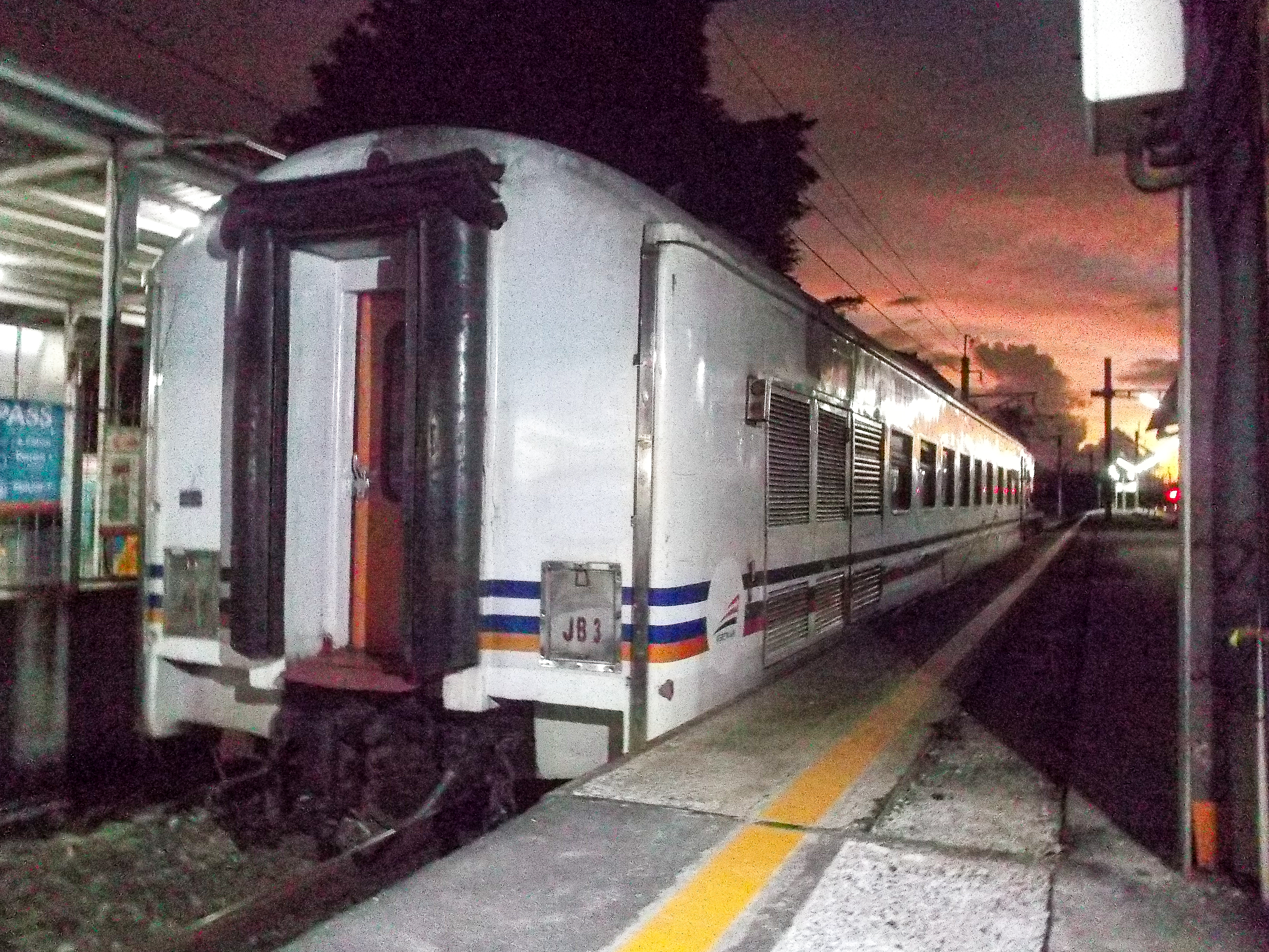
An extraordinary train on line 3 of the Sudimara station

Because local and regular express train services were removed in 2017, line 3 of Sudimara Station is rarely used because there is no more KRL Commuterline follow-up activity by the train. However, line 3 of Sudimara Station is still occasionally used as a place for storing or stabling Plasser & Theurer, where this maintenance train unit is usually used to maintain the condition of the rails on that line. Also, line 3 of Sudimara Station is also occasionally still used for overtaking KRL by coal trains, the Extraordinary Train (KLB), and sometimes it is also used as a place for storing or stabling KRL train series.

Sudimara station has a pedestrian tunnel, along with the Pondok Ranji Station, so passengers are no longer necessary to directly cross the rail tracks for safety.

R06 Sudimara
G
Main building
P

Platform floor

Side platform
Line 1
← (Rawa Buntu) Rangkasbitung Line to Rangkasbitung/Tigaraksa/Serpong
Line 2
Rangkasbitung Line to Tanah Abang (Jurangmangu) →
Island platform
Line 3
Rangkasbitung Line to Tanah Abang (Jurangmangu) →
G
Main building

== Services ==
The following is a list of train services at the Sudimara Station.

- KRL Commuterline
  - Green Line, towards Tanah Abang and Serpong (Serpong branch)
  - Green Line, towards Tanah Abang and Parung Panjang (Parung Panjang branch)
  - Green Line, towards Tanah Abang and Maja (Maja branch)
  - Green Line, towards Tanah Abang and Rangkasbitung (Rangkasbitung branch)

== Intermodal support ==
Public transport type	Line	Destination
Angkot	C02	Sudimara Station–CBD Ciledug
Angkot	D06	Sudimara Station–Ciputat
Angkot	D08	Ciputat–BSD City (via Sawah Lama Raya)

== Incidents ==
=== 1987 train crash ===
On 19 October 1987, there was an extraordinary incident of train collision between the local train numbered 225 Rangkasbitung–Jakarta Kota relation pulled by the BB306 16 locomotive and the Patas train numbered 220 Tanah Abang–Merak relation pulled by the BB303 16 locomotive, this event is also known as the first Bintaro tragedy. The collision incident that killed more than 100 people occurred between Kebayoran Station and Sudimara Station. It is indicated that the crash happened due to of miscomunication and misinformation between Sudimara Station train dispatcher and Kebayoran Lama Station train dispatcher.

=== Other incidents ===
- On 5 December 2021, a KRL JR 205-144F extraordinary train that was about to enter and stabling on line 3 of Sudimara Station (from the direction of Serpong Station) suddenly experienced a derailment after passing the train station and the Sudimara Railway crossing, this incident occurred at 12.30. As a result of this, regular KRL trips were disrupted, and the road at the Sudimara Railway crossing was impassable for vehicles because it was blocked by a series of the derailed KRL train.

Preceding station	Kereta Api Indonesia	Following station
Rawa Buntu towards Merak	Merak–Tanah Abang	Jurangmangu towards Tanah Abang
