= Pondok Ranji railway station =

Railway station in Indonesia

R04 Pondok Ranji Station Stasiun Pondok Ranji
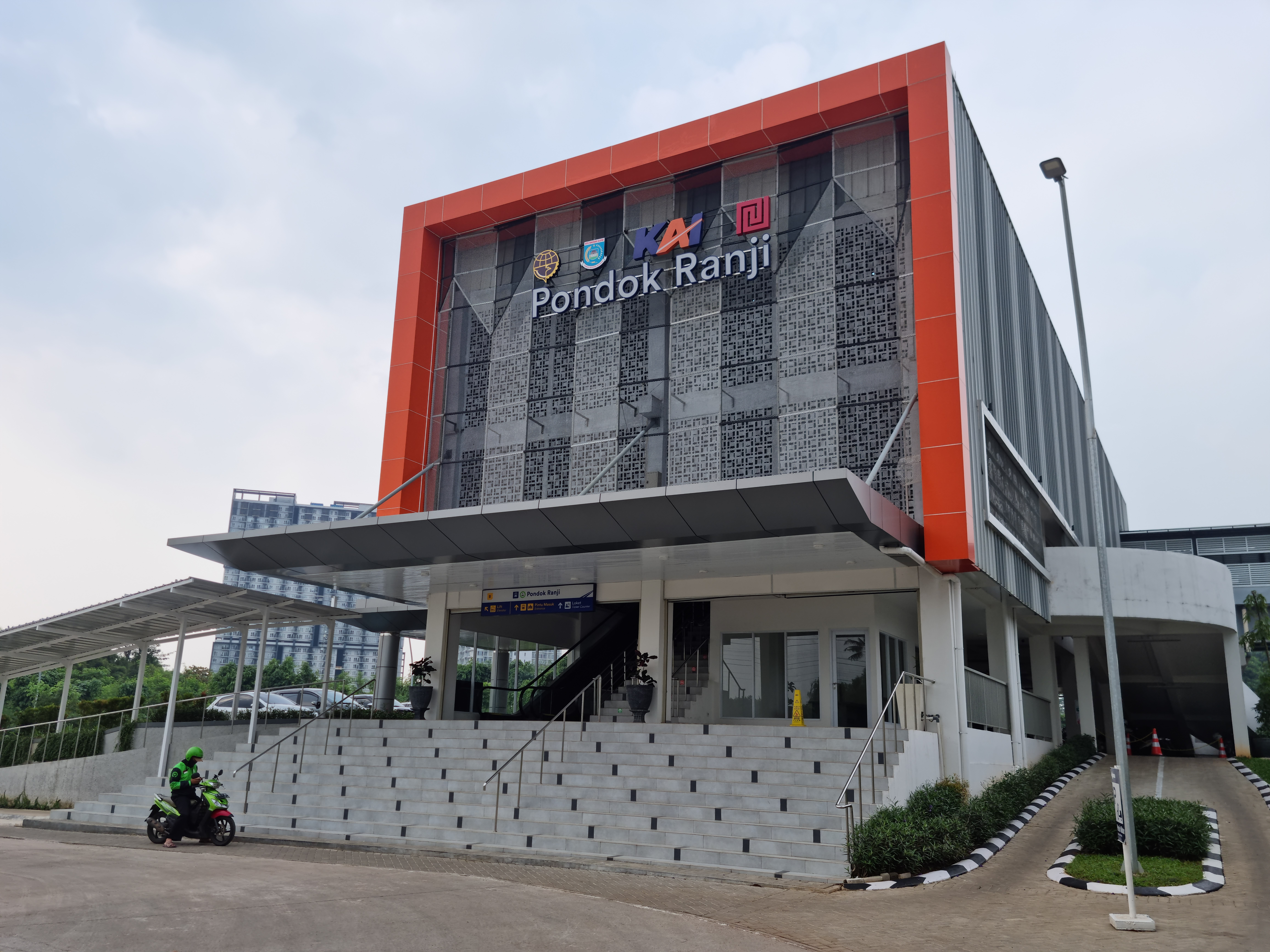
- Front view after renovation, 2022

General information
- Location: Jl. Stasiun Pondok Ranji, East Ciputat, South Tangerang; Banten; Indonesia
- Coordinates: 6.276595°S 106.744651°E
- Elevation: +25 m (82 ft)
- Owner: Kereta Api Indonesia
- Operator: KAI Commuter
- Lines: Rangkasbitung Line; Merak–Tanah Abang
- Platforms: 2 side platforms
- Tracks: 2

Construction
- Structure type: Ground
- Parking: Available
- Accessible: Available

Other information
- Station code: PDJ • PONDOK
- Classification: Class II

History
- Opened: 1990
- Electrified: 1992

Services
Preceding station		Following station
Kebayoran towards Tanah Abang	Rangkasbitung Commuter Line	Jurangmangu towards Rangkasbitung
Location
- Location within Java

Pondok Ranji Station (PDJ) is a railway station on the KRL Commuterline Green Line between the Pondok Ranji and Rengas subdistricts (kelurahan) of East Ciputat district (kecamatan), South Tangerang, Banten, Indonesia.The station is located at the elevation of +25 metres above sea level. Pondok Ranji is one of two stations serving the Bintaro housing area, along with Jurangmangu, located about 2 kilometers southwest.

It is the easternmost train station in South Tangerang and the southeasternmost in Banten. Its location is strategic because it is close to the Bintaro Jaya planned city.

== History ==
Pondok Ranji station is one of the stations that is quite new as it was opened in 1990 as a recommendation from the first Bintaro train crash in 1987.

On August 20, 2020, the Minister of Transportation, Budi Karya Sumadi attended the Groundbreaking New Image and Accessibility Improvement of the Pondok Ranji Station. The inauguration marked the start of the construction or renovation of the Pondok Ranji station. The inauguration was attended by the mayor of South Tangerang, Airin Rachmi Diany, also attended by the CEOs of Kereta Api Indonesia (KAI) Didiek Hartantyo and PT. Jaya Real Property (JRP) Trisna Muliadi as the manager and developer of Bintaro Jaya. Renovations were carried out at most parts of the station. In addition, there is an additional motorcycle parking location at the end of the station, which was newly built. The renovation was carried out as an effort to develop and improve transit infrastructures in South Tangerang.

In January 2022, the renovations works were completed. On June 16, 2022, the station was reinaugurated by the transportation minister Budi Karya Sumadi, accompanied by the Minister of State-Owned Enterprises Erick Thohir, A new access from the Bintaro Creative Village was also opened at the same day.

== Station layout ==
This station has two railway lines. Line 1 is a straight line towards Serpong, while line 2 is a straight line towards Tanah Abang. Platforms have been extended to accommodate KRL with 10-car trains. Currently Pondok Ranji Station already has a pedestrian tunnel, along with Sudimara Station, so that passengers no longer need to cross the tracks. After passing the fare gates, passengers are directed to the pedestrian tunnel.

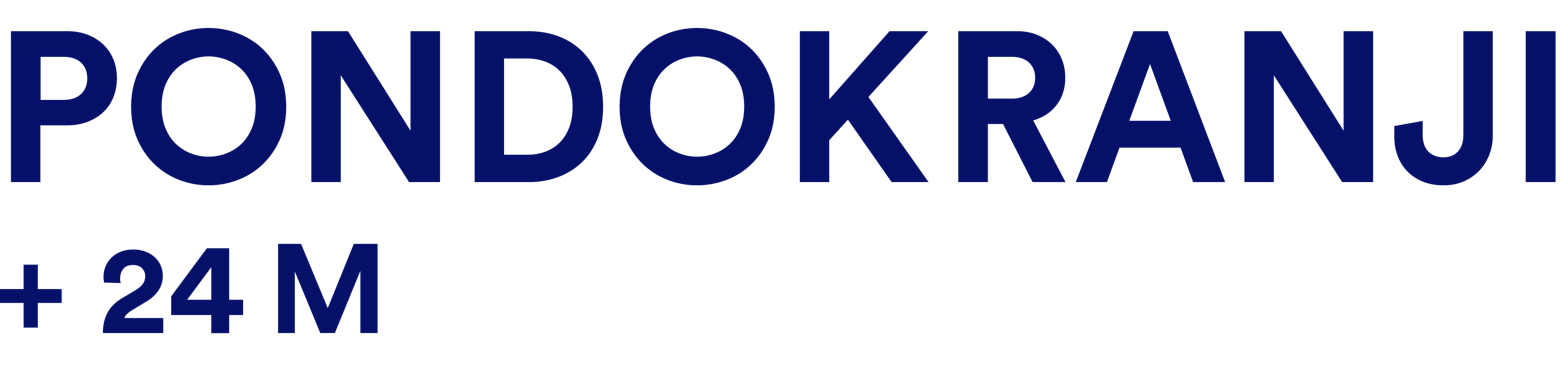
R04
G	Main Building	
Platform floor	Side platform, the doors are opened on the right side	
Platform floor	Line 1	← (Jurangmangu) Rangkasbitung Line to Serpong/Tigaraksa/Rangkasbitung
Platform floor	Line 2	Rangkasbitung Line to Tanah Abang (Kebayoran) →
Platform floor	Side platform, the doors are opened on the right side	
G	Main Building	

== Services ==
The following is a list of train services at the Pondok Ranji Station.

- KRL Commuterline
  - Green Line, towards Tanah Abang and Serpong (Serpong branch)
  - Green Line, towards Tanah Abang and Parung Panjang (Parung Panjang branch)
  - Green Line, towards Tanah Abang and Maja (Maja branch)
  - Green Line, towards Tanah Abang and Rangkasbitung (Rangkasbitung branch)

== Supporting transportation ==
Type	Route	Destination
Angkot (Share taxi)	D09	Situ Gintung-Pondok Jagung
Angkot (Share taxi)	S10	Pondok Cabe bus terminal–Pondok Karya
Angkot (Share taxi)	D18	Pondok Cabe bus terminal–Ulujami
Angkot (Share taxi)	S08	Lebak Bulus–Pondok Karya

== Incidents ==
- On February 4, 2016, Fitri "the Spiderkid" who liked to climb buildings and towers was killed by a KRL train at Pondok Ranji Station after falling while climbing the station wall.
- On July 30, 2022, a woman was killed by a KRL train number 2030 bound for Parung Panjang near Pondok Ranji Station. The victim, who was wearing a red scarf, was then taken to Fatmawati Hospital.

== Gallery ==
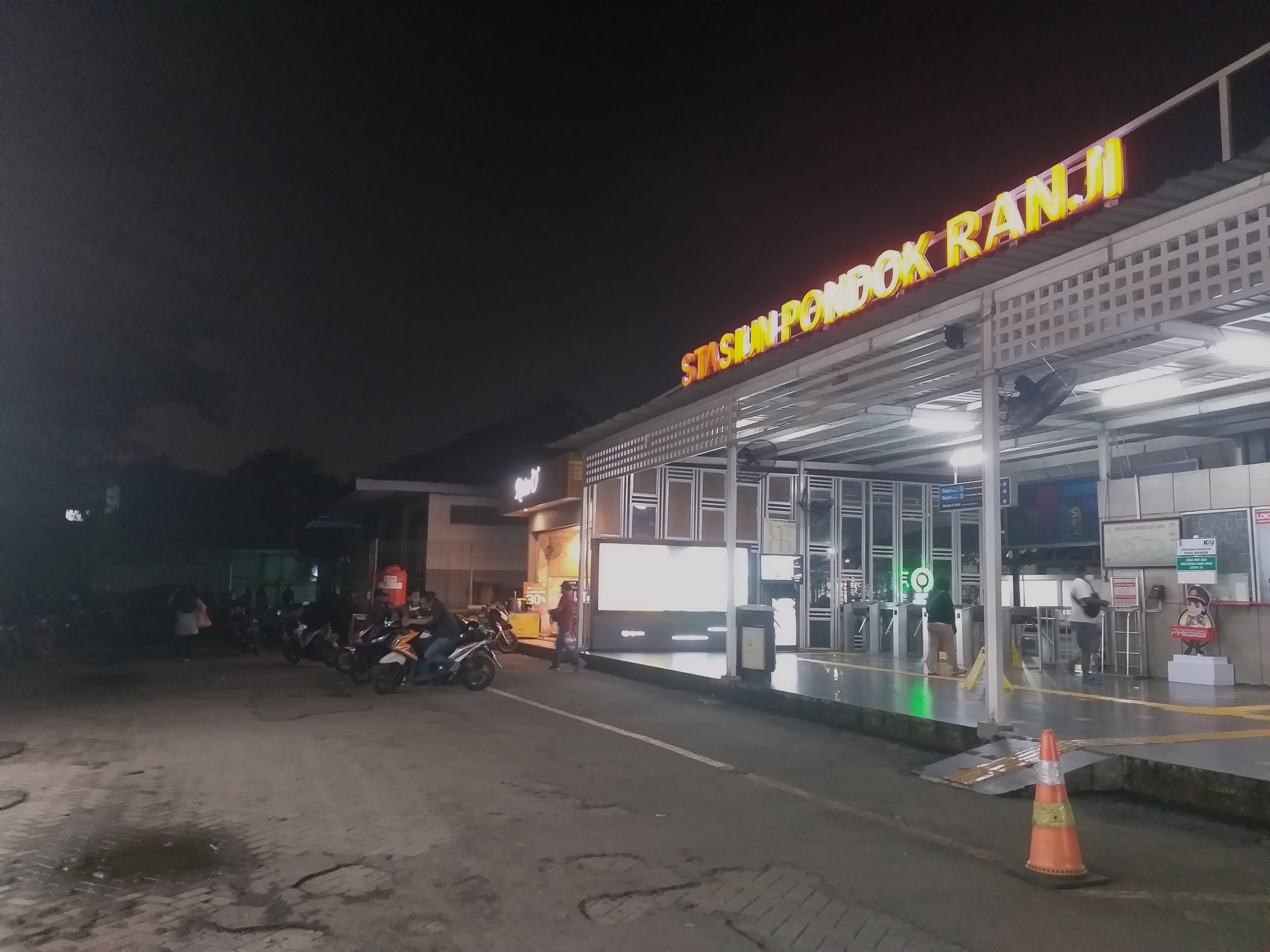
The entrance of the station during its renovation (2021)

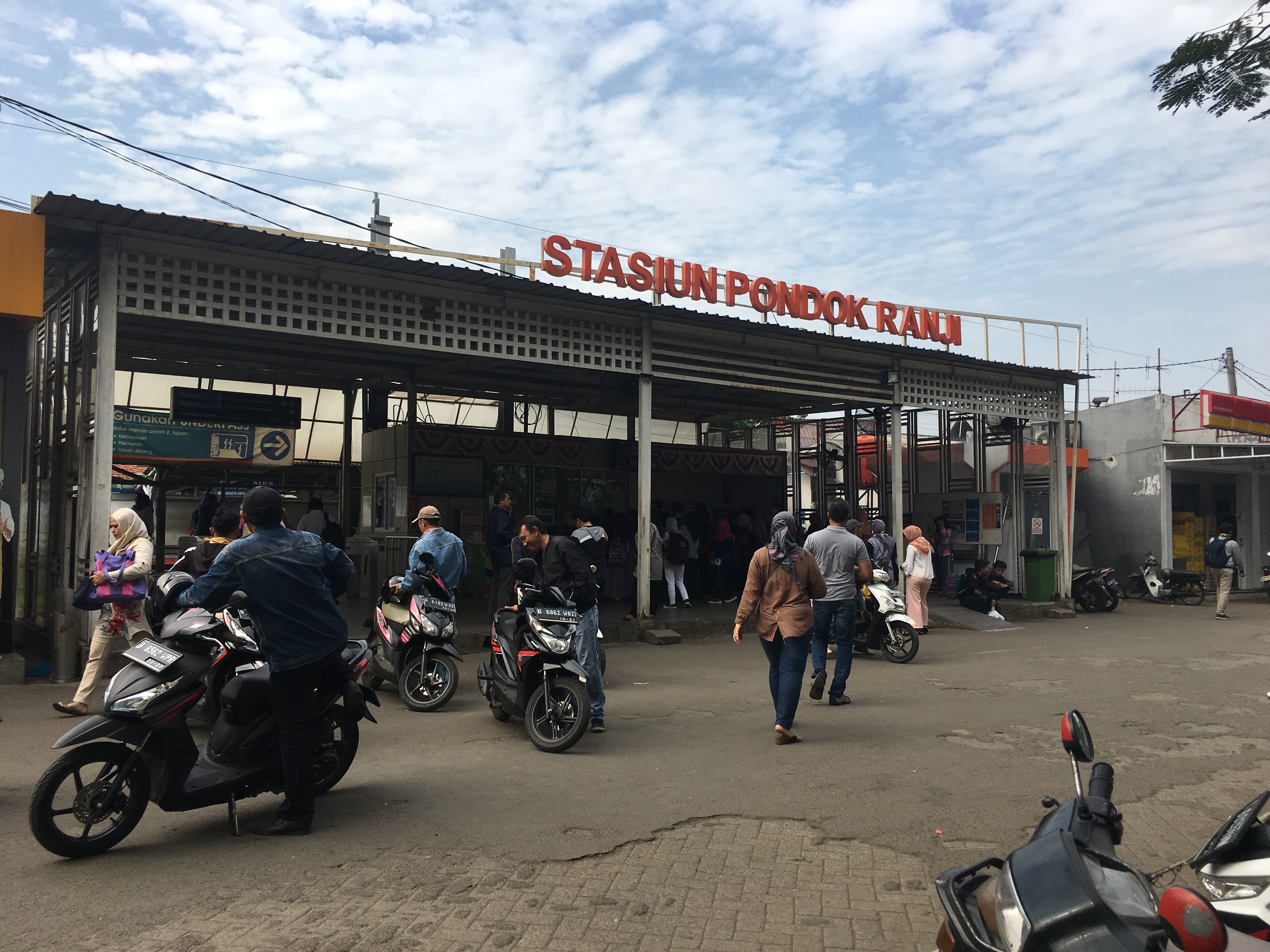
The frontage and entrance of the station (2017)

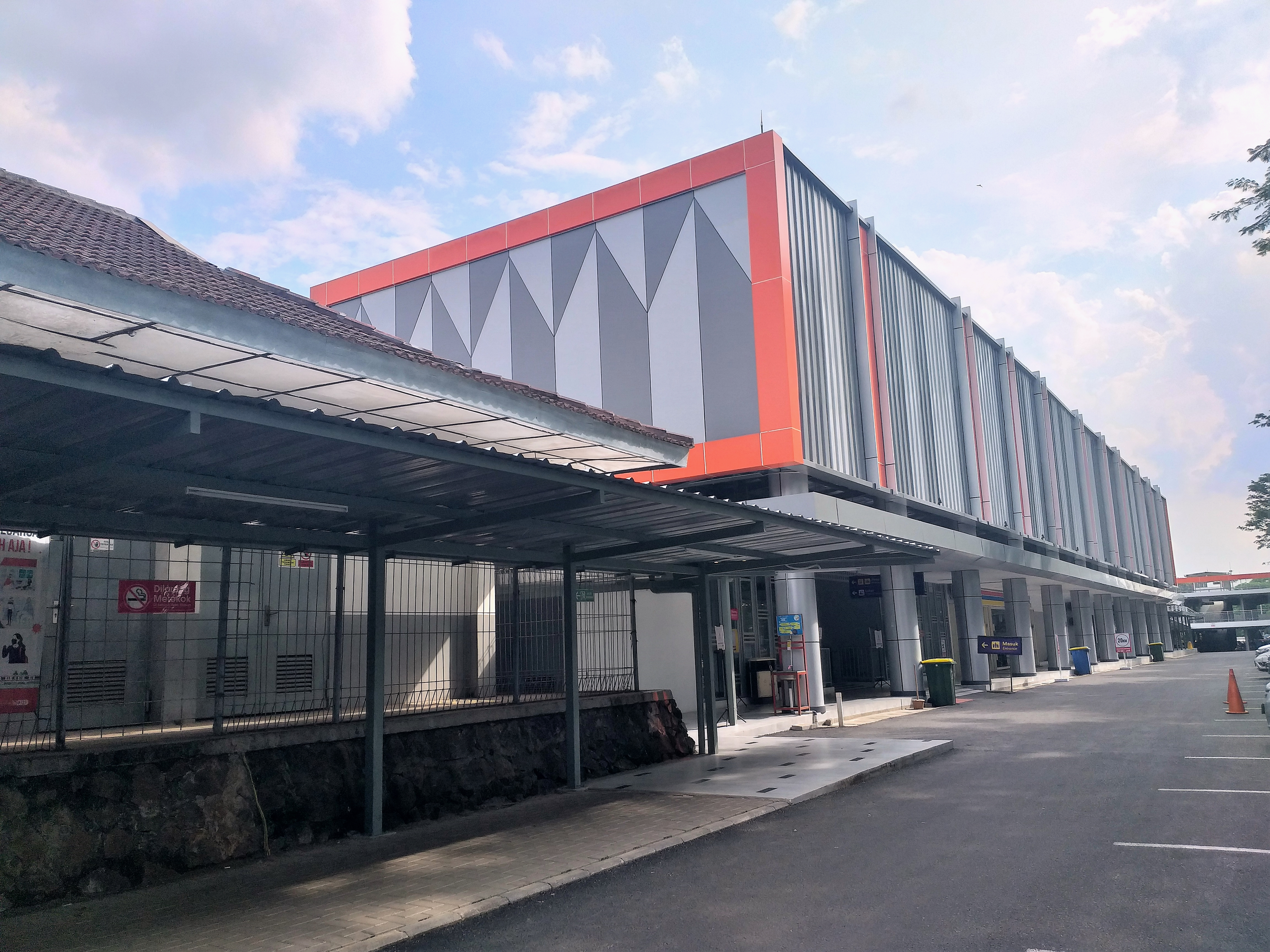
One of the station's entrances in February 2022

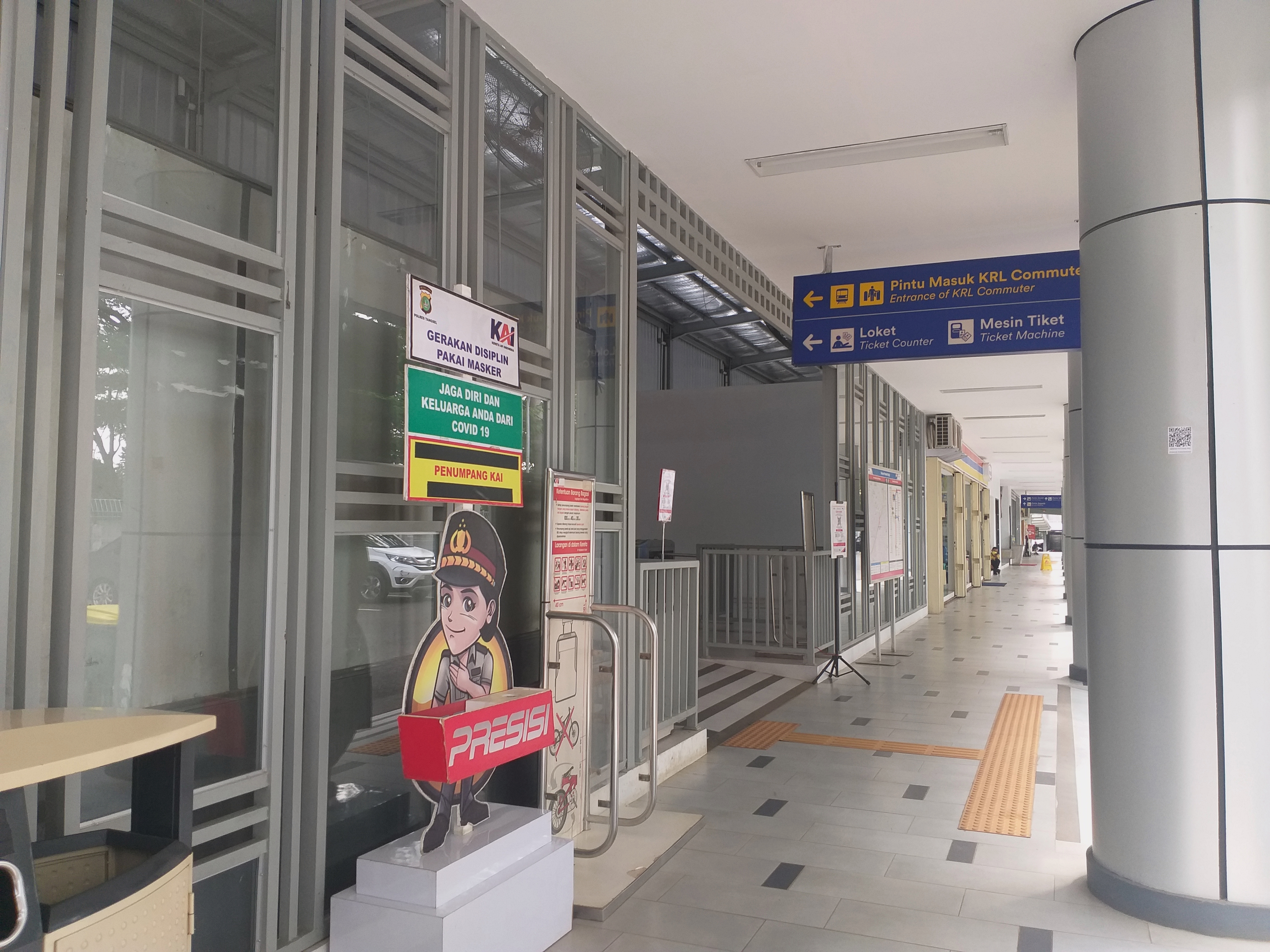
The entrance of the station (February 2022)

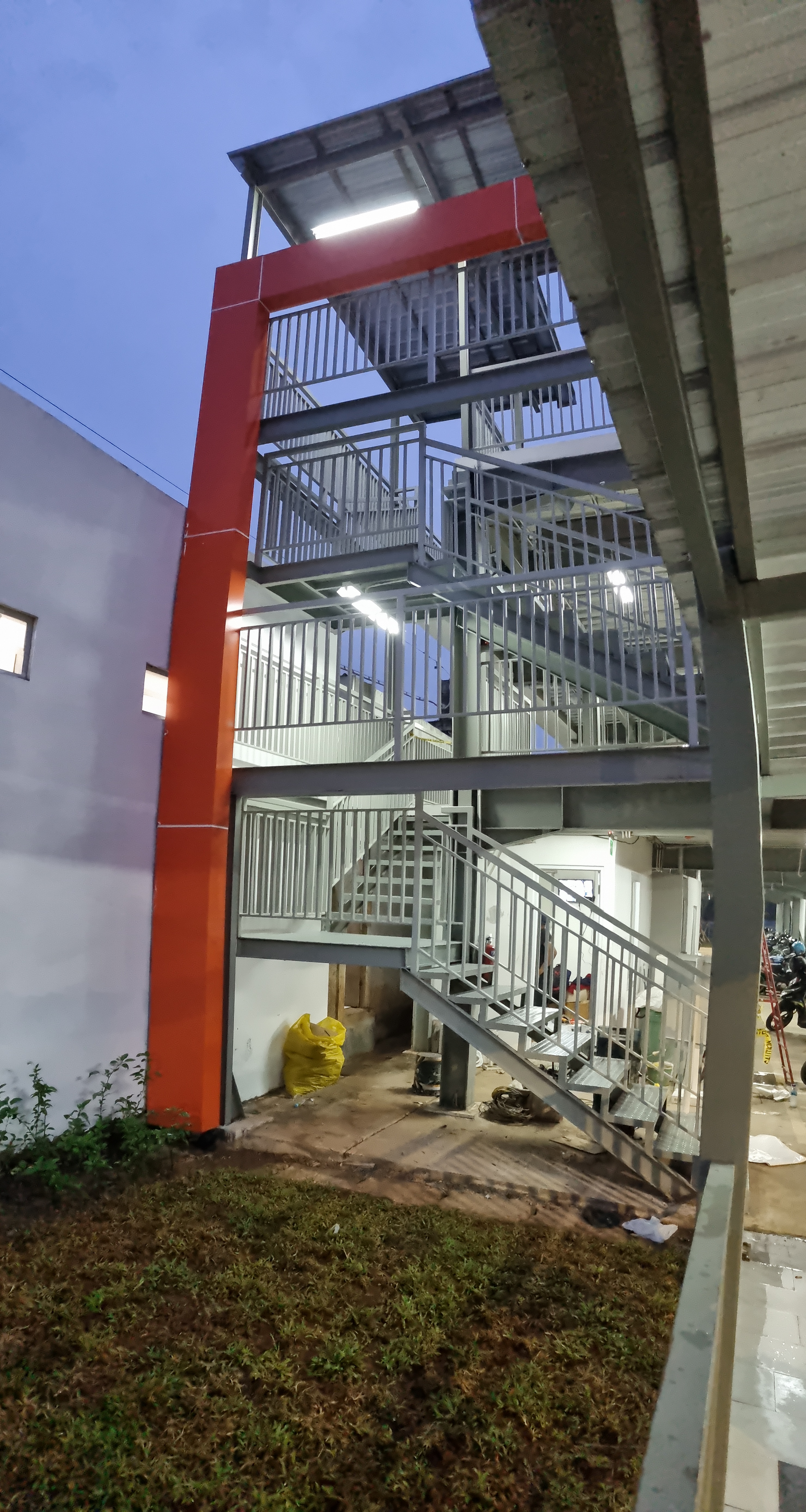
Stairway to the station's motorcycle parking station

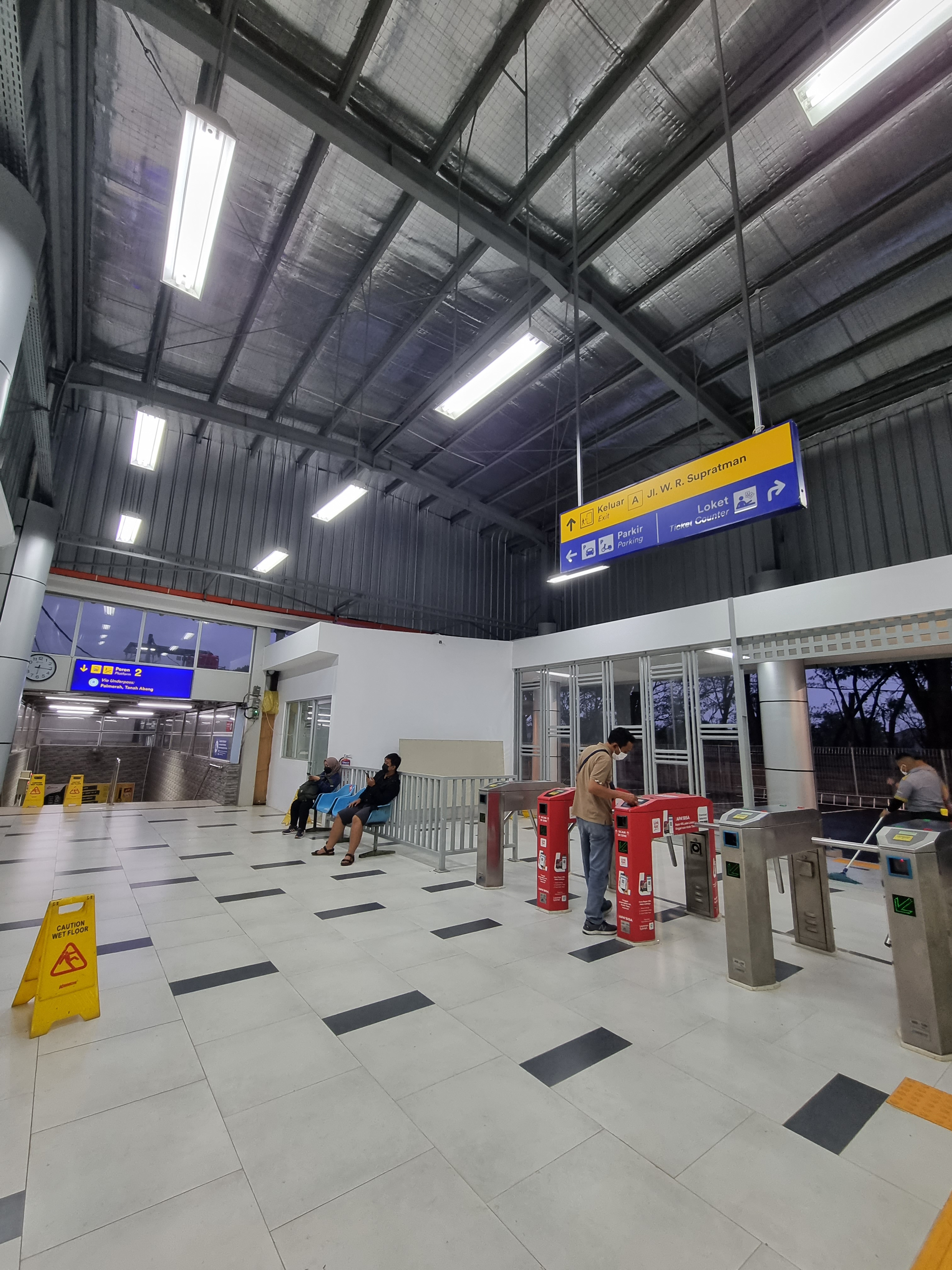
The fare gates of the station from the new building via the W.R. Supratman street near the station tunnel.

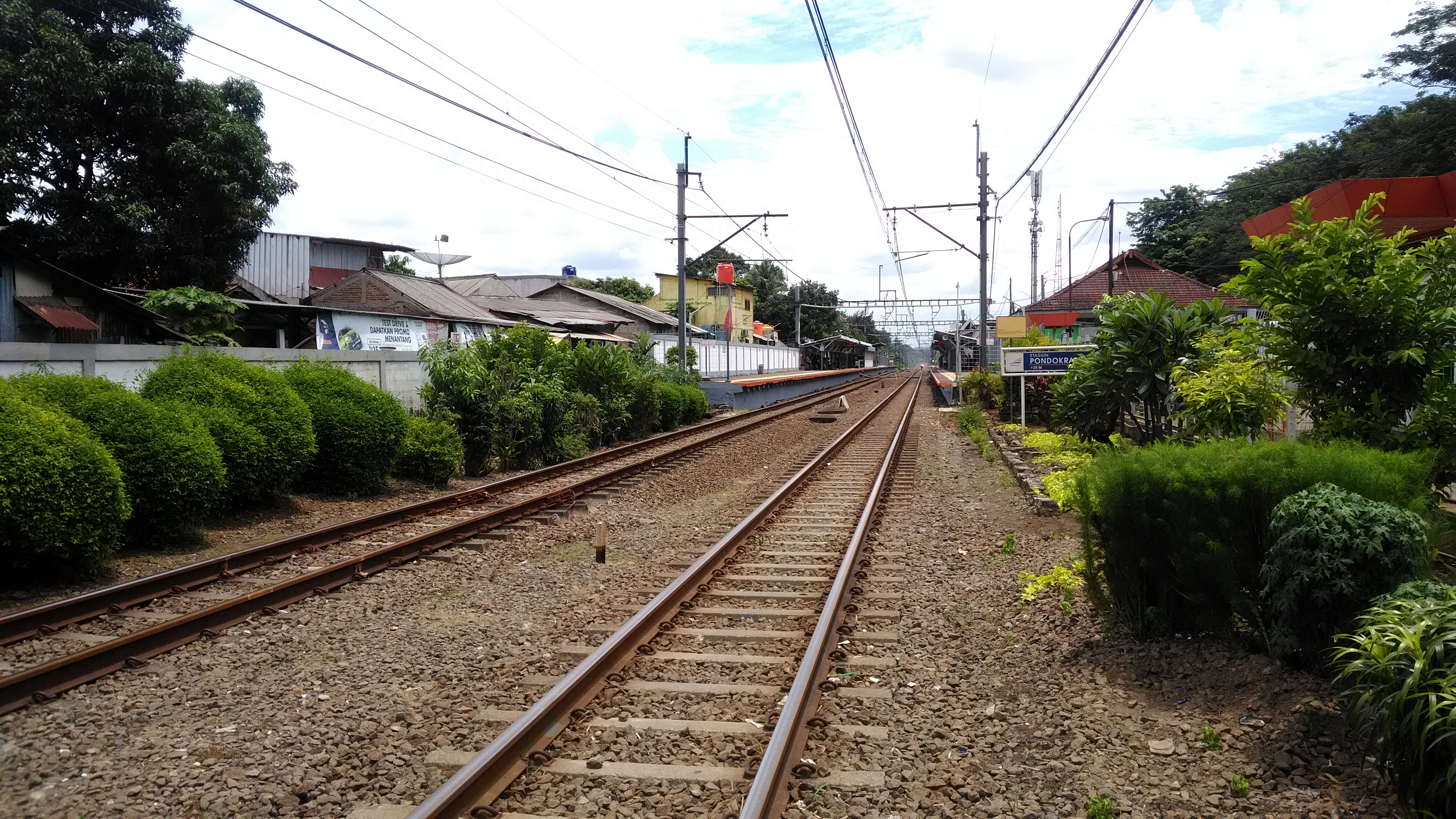
The emplacement of the station in 2019.

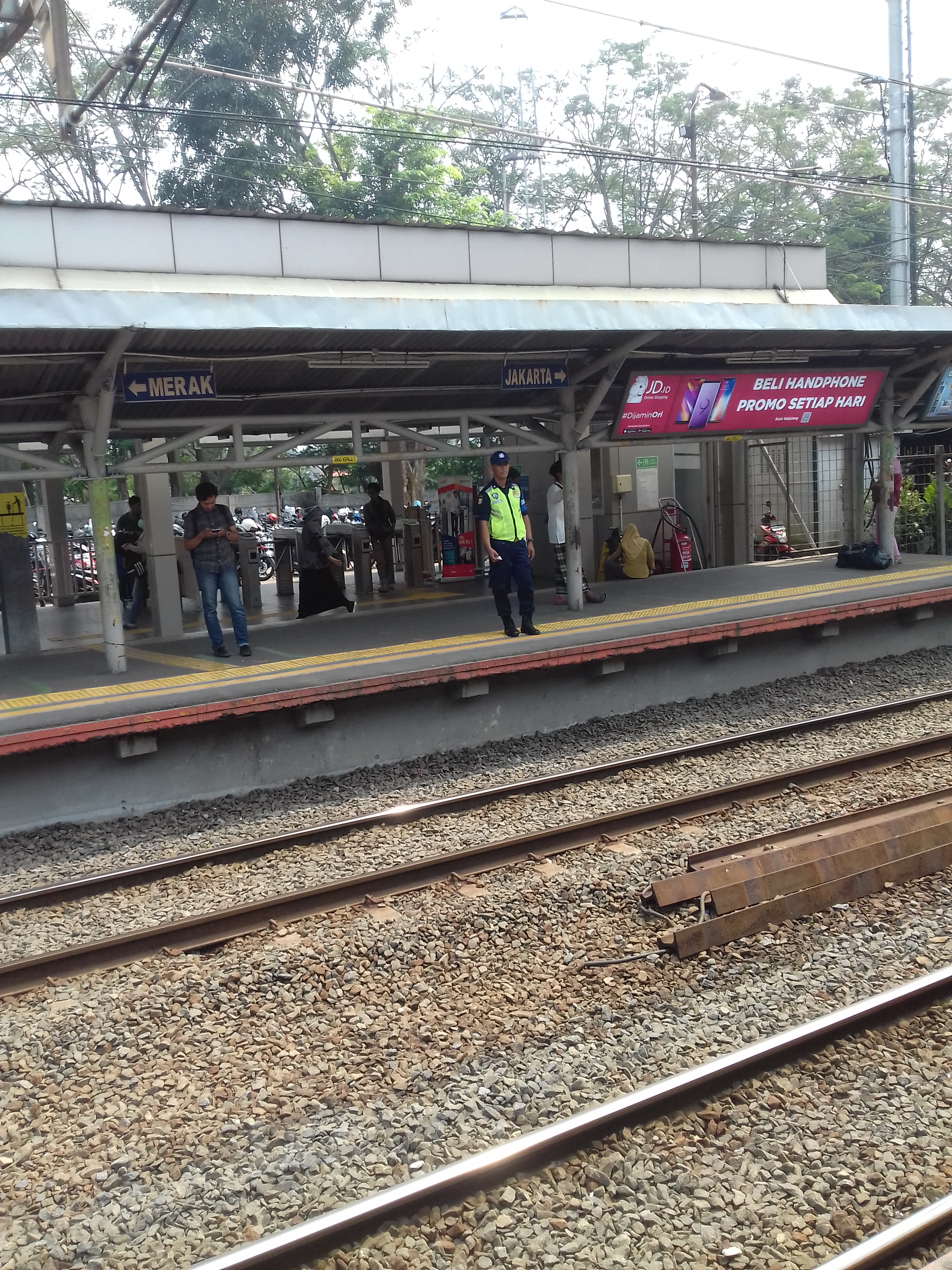
The station platform prior to renovation

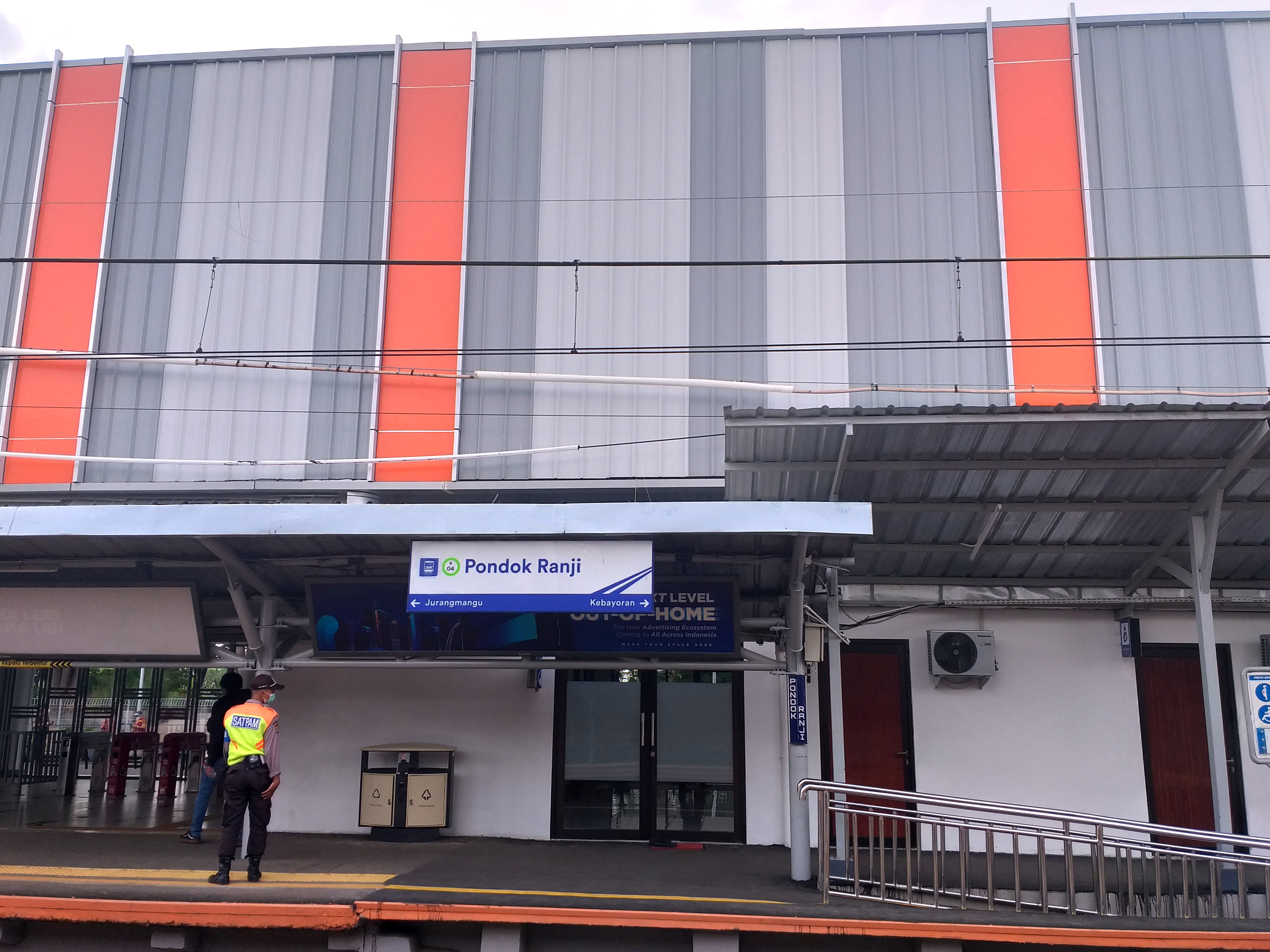
The platform 1 of the station after renovation

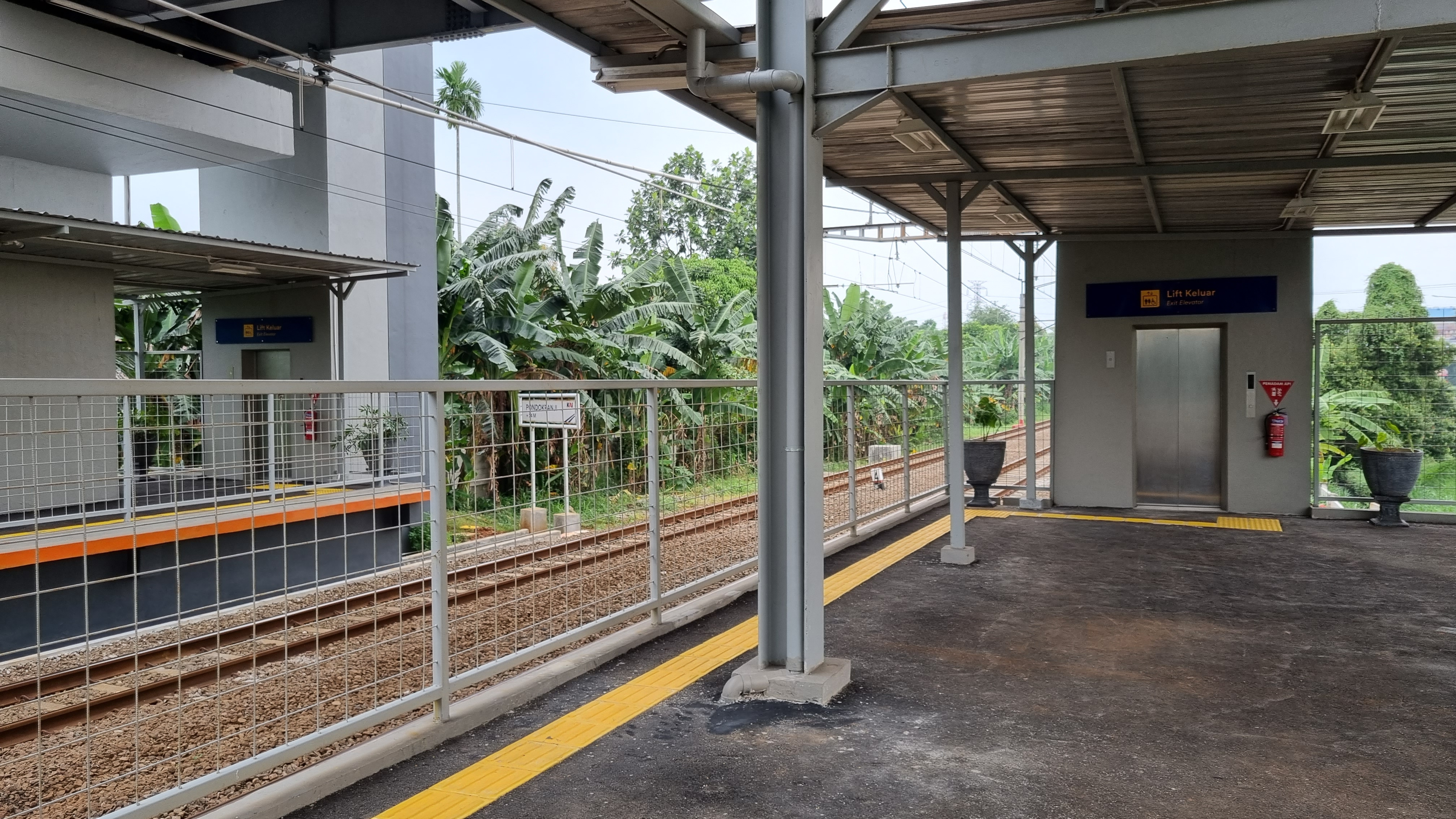
Escalators, staircase, and, elevators are available to access the station's concourse

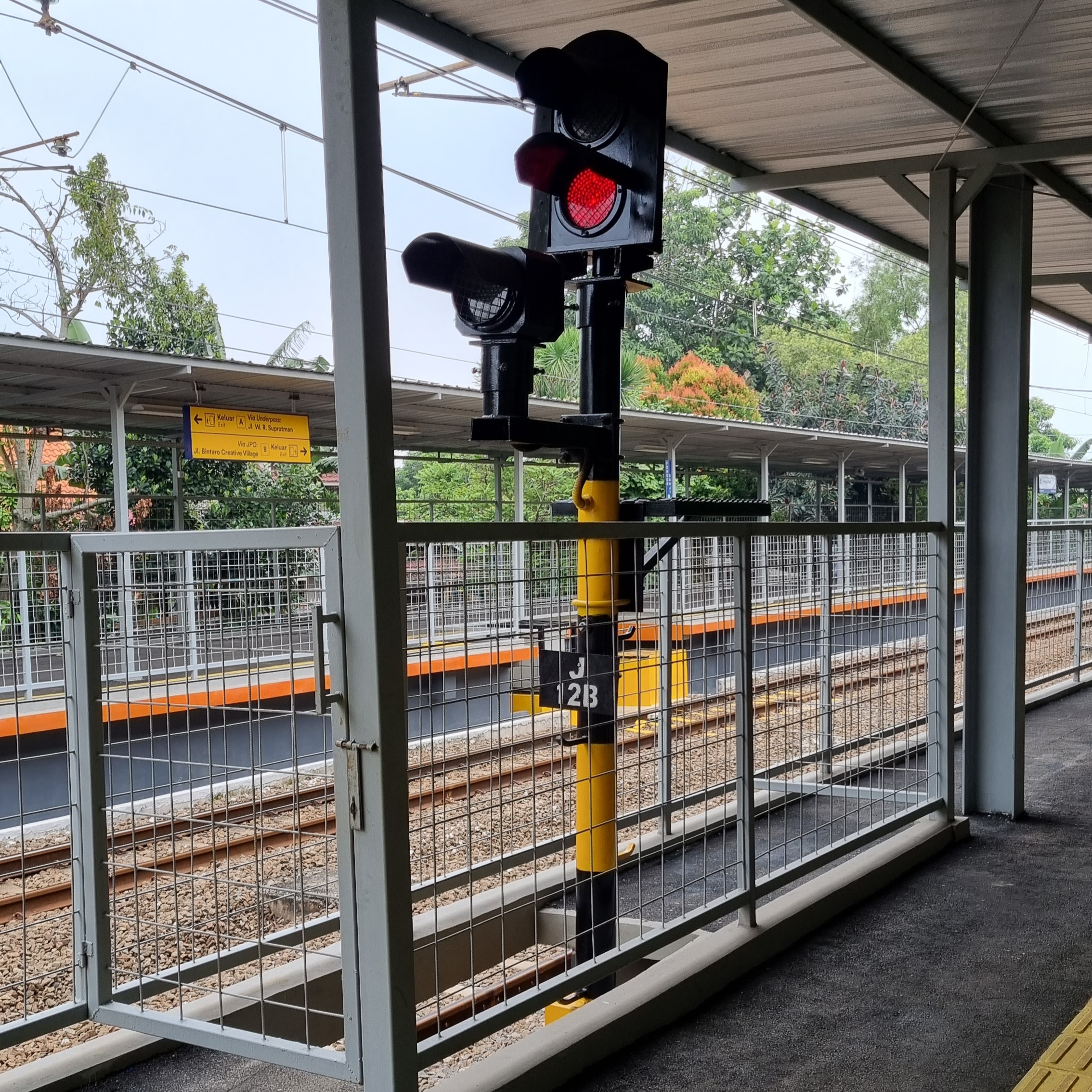
The electric signal of the station

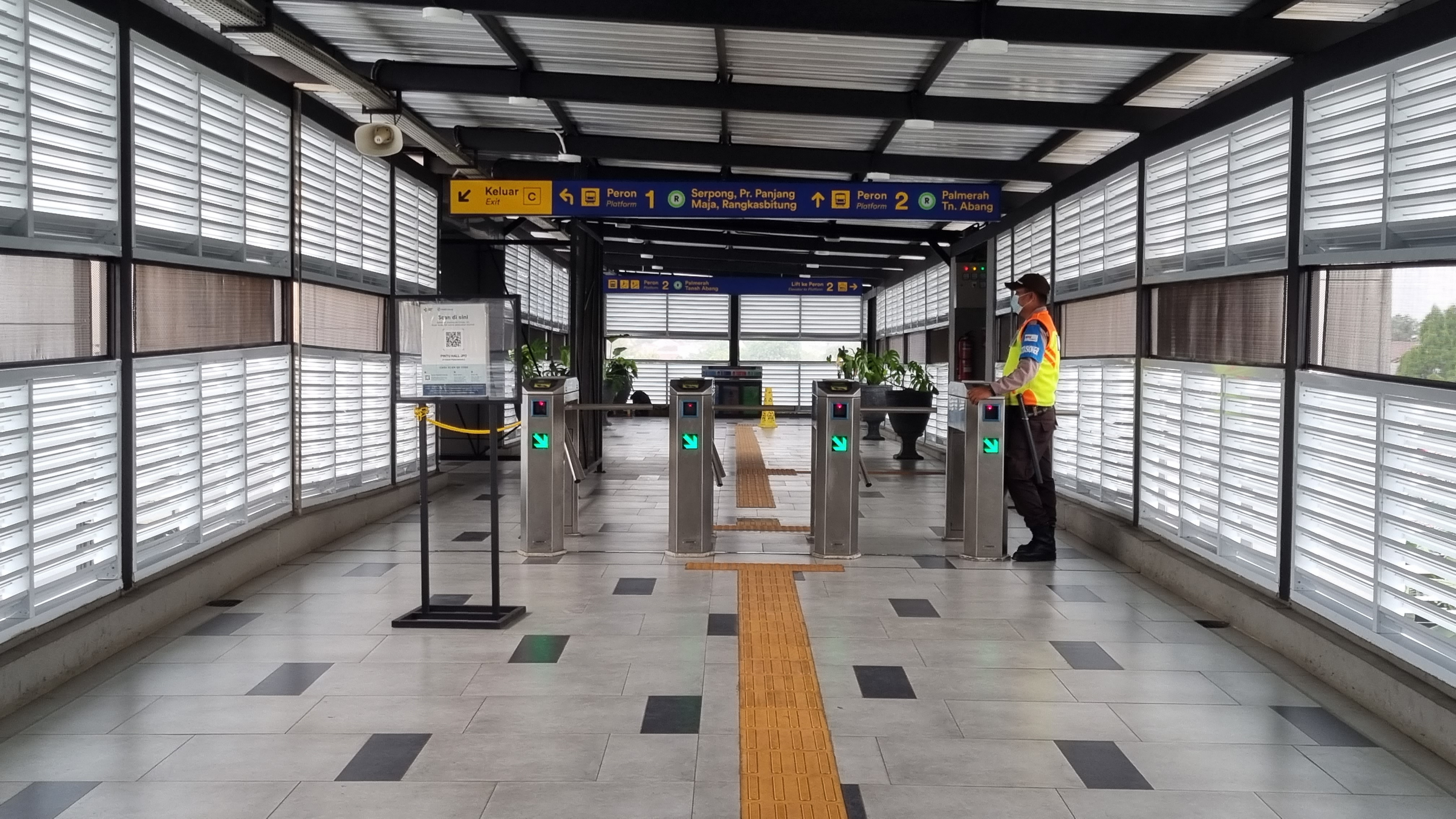
The fare gates of the station Pondok Ranji on the new pedestrian bridge. To the left is the exit access to the Pertamina housing complex.

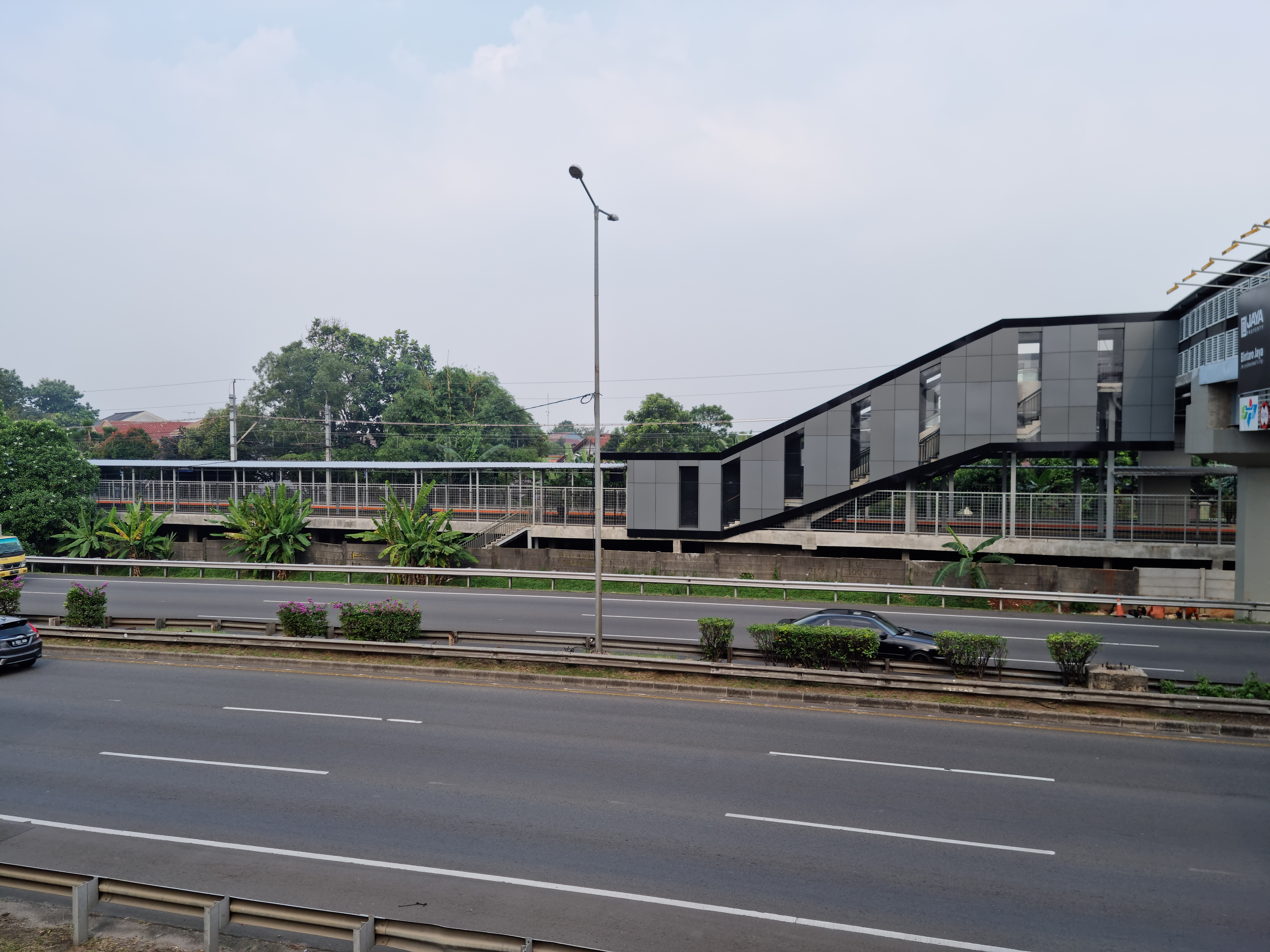
The station's pedestrian bridge which crosses above the Jakarta–Serpong Toll Road and the train line

Preceding station	Kereta Api Indonesia	Following station
Jurangmangu towards Merak	Merak–Tanah Abang	Kebayoran towards Tanah Abang
