= Kebayoran railway station =

Railway station in Indonesia

R03 Kebayoran Station Stasiun Kebayoran
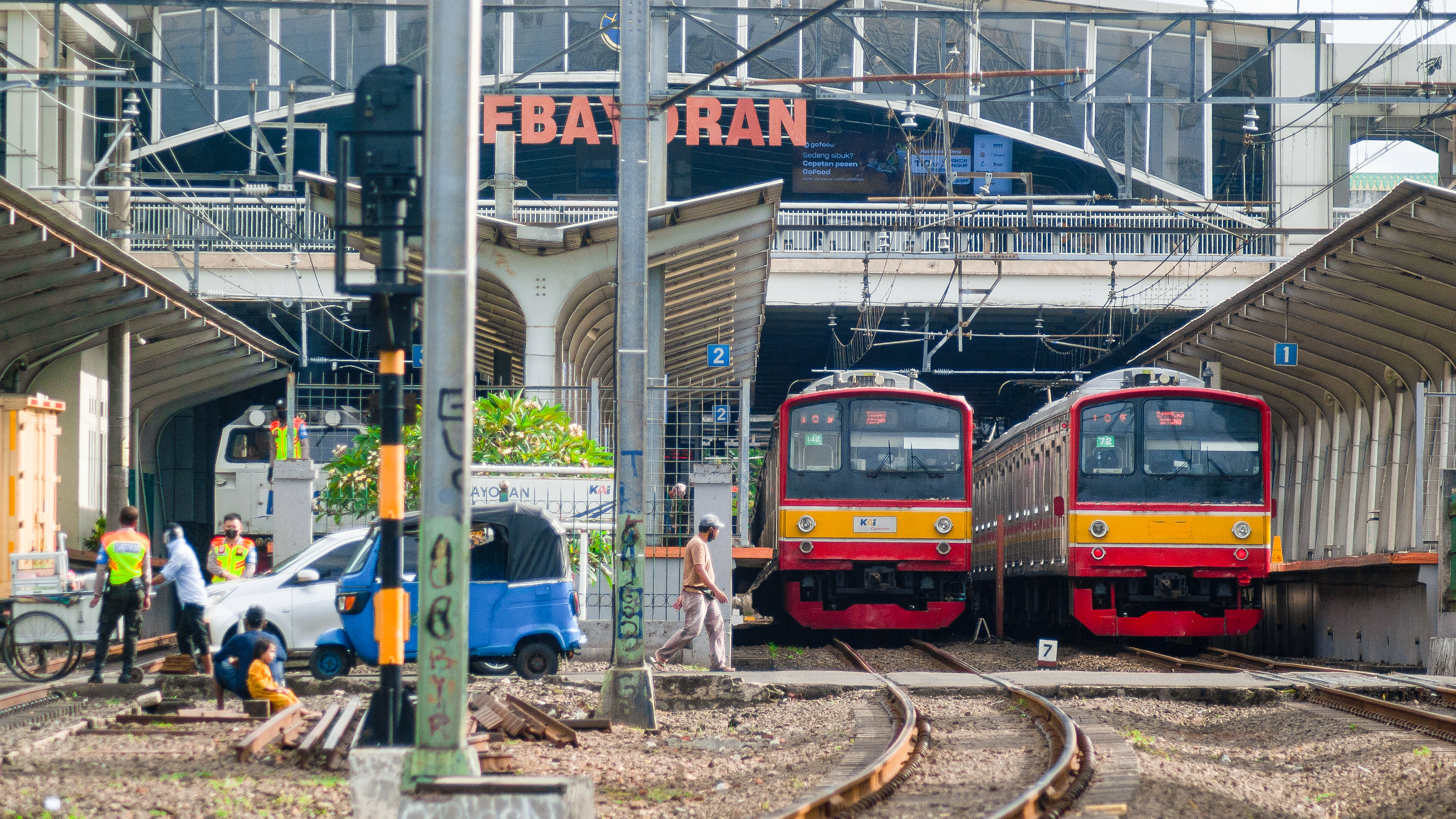
- Kebayoran Station yard in full capacity

General information
- Other names: Kebayoran Lama Station
- Location: Jalan Masjid Al-Huda no. 12, Kebayoran Lama Utara, Kebayoran Lama, South Jakarta 12240, Jakarta, Indonesia
- Elevation: +4,2 m
- Owner: Kereta Api Indonesia
- Operator: Kereta Api Indonesia; KAI Commuter
- Manager: KAI Commuter
- Line: Rangkasbitung Line
- Platforms: 2 side platforms; 1 island platform
- Tracks: 3 (line 1 and 2: straight tracks)
- Connections: Kebayoran; Velbak

Construction
- Accessible: Available

Other information
- Station code: KBY • 0216 • BAYORAN
- Classification: II

History
- Opened: 1 October 1899
- Rebuilt: 2014-2016
- Electrified: 1992-1994
- Former names: Kebajoran
- Original company: Staatsspoorwegen

Services
Preceding station		Following station
Palmerah towards Tanah Abang	Rangkasbitung Commuter Line	Pondok Ranji towards Rangkasbitung
Location

Kebayoran Station (KBY) or commonly known as Kebayoran Lama Station is a class II railway station located near the area of the Kebayoran Lama market, South Jakarta, Jakarta, Indonesia. The station, which is located 4.2 m (14 ft), is the westernmost railway station in Jakarta and only serves KRL Commuterline.

Prior to its designation as a KRL Commuterline–only station, Kebayoran Station also served local train services to Rangkasbitung and Merak. These services were discontinued on 1 April 2017 and replaced by the KRL Commuterline Green Line. Kebayoran is one of the stations on the Merak–Tanah Abang railway that currently operates from a new station building, along with Maja, Parung Panjang, and Palmerah.

== History ==
Staatsspoorwegen built a railway line from Duri to Rangkasbitung via Tanah Abang in order to accommodate passengers from Banten to Batavia. The railway line was inaugurated on 1 October 1899, and the operation of regular trains immediately began.

At the time, Kebayoran Station had five tracks and was filled with a series of sand carriages, and a B51 steam locomotive was permanently ready to shunt carriages, both at the embankments and the branch rails that led to the loading and unloading warehouse. This changed in the 1970s, when the shunting locomotive was replaced by the C300 diesel locomotive. Kebayoran Station also had a branch track leading to an iron hemispherical material warehouse building, which was managed by the Department of Public Works. The warehouse was used to unload construction materials transported from trains on the branch line for the construction of the Kebayoran Baru satellite city.

The material warehouse was demolished in 2001 and its former location became the Simprug Center apartment. It was estimated that the former branch track would still be visible until 1985, until they were finally dismantled when a new level crossing was made, at the same time as Jalan Kramat which was located on the branches railbed. The same conditions were created at Rawa Buntu Station, with a branch track to the north that goes to Cisadane River banks to transport construction materials.

In the late-1980s the number of tracks was reduced to only three, and carriage loading and unloading activities stopped as trucks transporting materials began to operate directly to the loading and unloading location.

In 1992–1994, the Tanah Abang–Serpong plot was electrified with French model overhead lines, one of which was to support the Serpong Express EMU journey which was touted as the forerunner of the current Rangkasbitung Line. At the time, only tracks 1 and 2 were electrified at the station, with track 3 was only electrified after 2005 with a Japanese-style overhead line pole. In addition, it was estimated that in the early 1990s the station platform was also heightened.

In the early 2000s, the station had a total of 3 tracks, with track 1 as a straight track, track 2 as a turn signal used for both traffic and crossings, and track 3 used for overtaking trains, although this line is sometimes used as a place to store or stabling the Plasser & Theurer maintenance train unit. Since the double track operation on Tanah Abang–Serpong line as of 4 July 2007, the station layout has been overhauled by adding track 2 as a new straight track.

In order to increase the occupancy of KRL Green Line passengers, in 2014-2016 the Ministry of Transportation of Indonesia began major renovation for several stations (including Kebayoran Station) into 2 levels with modern and magnificent architecture and complete facilities. On 11 May 2016, the construction of the three stations were completed and inaugurated by the Director General of Railways, Hermanto Dwiatmoko together with the Regent of Lebak, Iti Octavia Jayabaya, at Maja Station.

== Building and layout ==
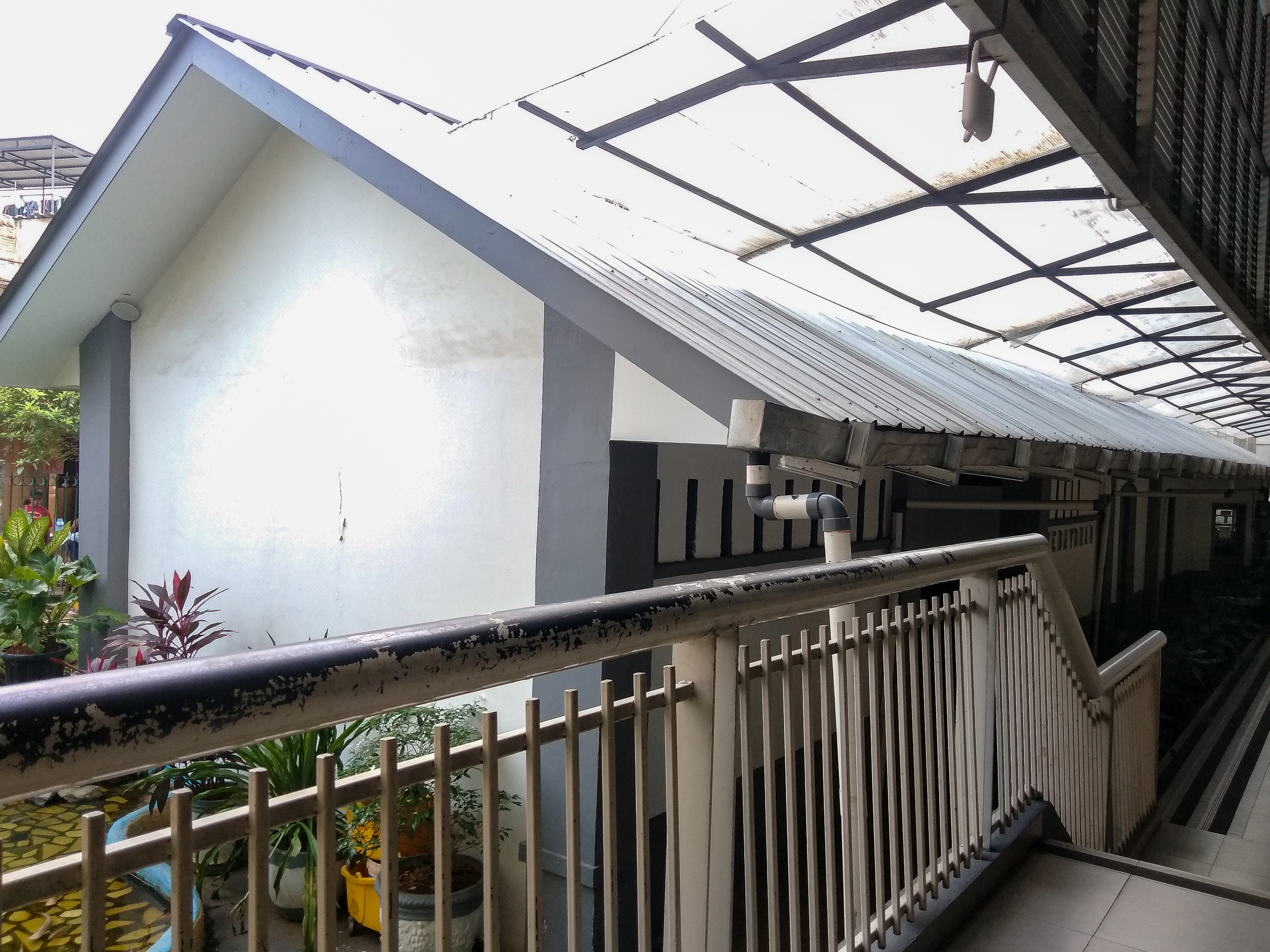
The original building of Kebayoran station

Even though Kebayoran Station has been renovated to be grand and spacious, the old station building, which is a legacy of Staatsspoorwegen, is still maintained and the train dispatcher room which is also part of the old station building is still in use today. Due to cancellation of regular Rangkas Jaya Train and Kalimaya Train services in 2017, track 3 is rarely used. However, this three station line is still occasionally used as a place for storing or stabling Plasser and Theurer, where this maintenance train unit is usually used to maintain the rail condition on that line. This track is also occasionally used for EMU when it is overtook by short series of coal trains, extraordinary trains, and sometimes it is also used as an EMU stabling place.

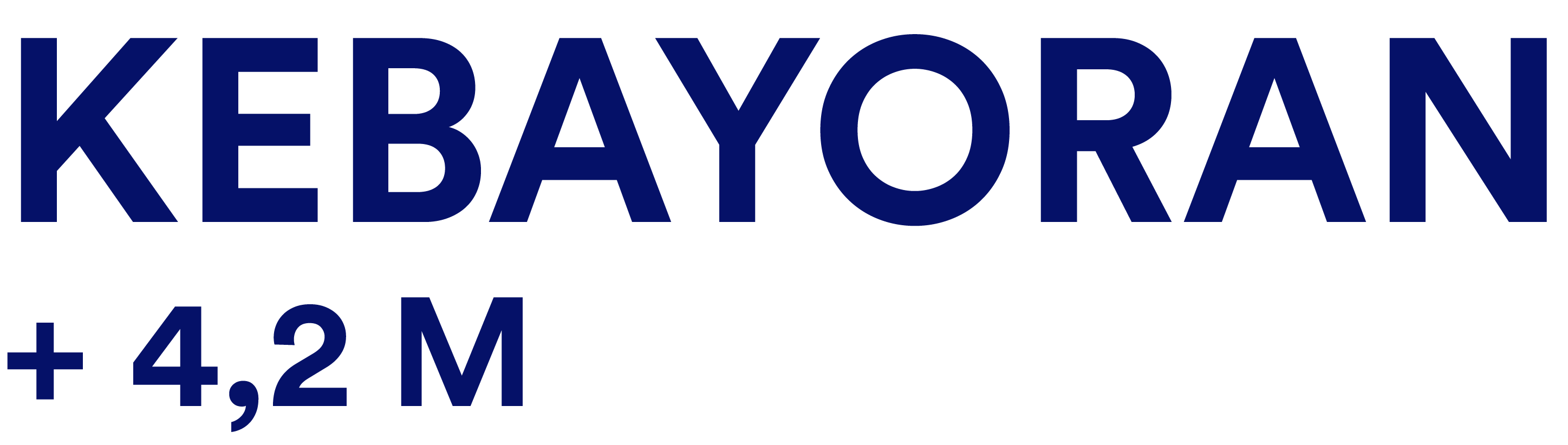
R03
G
Main building
P

Platform floor

Side platform
Line 1
← (Pondok Ranji) Rangkasbitung Line to Serpong/Tigaraksa/Rangkasbitung
Line 2
Rangkasbitung Line to Tanah Abang (Palmerah) →
Island platform
Line 3
Rangkasbitung Line to Tanah Abang (Palmerah) →
G
Main building

== Services ==
=== Passenger services ===
==== KRL Commuterline ====
Train line name	Destination	Notes
Rangkasbitung Line	Tanah Abang	-
Rangkasbitung Line	Rangkasbitung	-

== Supporting transportation ==
Kebayoran Station is connected with the Transjakarta BRT services on corridor 8 at Kebayoran bus station, and corridor 13 at Velbak bus station via a pedestrian skywalk. The skywalk construction was carried out in March 2022, in order to create a seamless transportation integration by connecting the station with both bus stations.

The skywalk has supporting facilities, including elevators for transferring KRL Commuterline and TransJakarta passengers.

Construction was completed in early 2023, and underwent a public trial from 21 to 24 January 2023. It was inaugurated on 27 January 2023 by Acting Governor of Jakarta, Heru Budi Hartono.

Type	Station	Route	Destination
TransJakarta	Kebayoran	List of TransJakarta corridors#Corridor 8	Lebak Bulus–Pasar Baru
TransJakarta	Velbak	List of TransJakarta corridors#Corridor 13	Ciledug–Tegal Mampang
TransJakarta	Velbak		Puri Beta–Pancoran
TransJakarta	Velbak		Puri Beta–Flyover Kuningan (Express)
TransJakarta	N/A	1Q (non-BRT)	Rempoa–Blok M
TransJakarta	N/A	8C (MetroTrans)	Kebayoran–Tanah Abang Station
TransJakarta	Kebayoran	8D (non-BRT)	Joglo–Blok M
TransJakarta	N/A	8E (non-BRT)	Bintaro–Blok M
TransJakarta	Pasar Kebayoran Lama	9E (non-BRT)	Kebayoran–Jelambar
TransJakarta	N/A	JAK-11 (MikroTrans Jak Lingko)	Kebayoran Station–Tanah Abang Station
TransJakarta	N/A	JAK-12 (MikroTrans Jak Lingko)	Kebayoran Station–Tanah Abang Station (via Pos Pengumben)
Mikrolet	N/A	M09	Kebayoran Lama Station–Tanah Abang Station
Mikrolet	N/A	M09A	Kebayoran Lama Station–Tanah Abang Station
Angkot	N/A	S03	Kebayoran Lama Station–Pondok Labu
Angkot	N/A	S07	Kebayoran Lama Station–Pondok Betung, South Tangerang
Angkot	N/A	S10	Kebayoran Lama Station–Lebak Bulus Grab MRT station (via Tanah Kusir)
Angkot	N/A	C01	Kebayoran Lama Station–CBD Ciledug
Angkot	N/A	D01	Kebayoran Lama Station–Pondok Cabe bus terminal

== Incidents ==
=== 1987 train crash ===
A crash occurred on 19 October 1987 when train 225 between Rangkasbitung–Jakarta Kota, pulled by a BB306 16 locomotive, collided with train 220 between Merak–Tanah Abang pulled by the BB303 16 locomotive between Kebayoran Station and Sudimara Station in Pondok Betung, Bintaro, South Jakarta. Over 100 people were killed. According to PJKA (now KAI), it was suspected that the train crash happened due to miscommunication between the Kebayoran Station train dispatcher and the Sudimara Station train dispatcher. According to the story, the remnants of the passenger trains from the Bintaro tragedy were pulled over and parked at the Kebayoran Station emplacement in a condition already covered with tarps.

=== Other incidents ===
- On 12 November 1988, a year and 24 days after the Bintaro crash, a collision occurred between the train 800 between Tanah Abang–Parung Panjang pulled by the BB303 15 locomotive and a coal train 1031 between Cigading-Bekasi pulled by the BB304 25 locomotive, no casualties in this incident. The collision occurred at 04.00 a.m., about 20 meters northward towards Palmerah from Jalan Kramat railroad crossing, Kebayoran Lama. The railroad crossing was also closed and could not be passed by vehicles, because it was blocked by a series of coal carriages from KA 1031. The roads around the Kebayoran Lama area became congested, because vehicles and public transport heading towards Blok M were diverted via Kebayoran Lama Street. As a result, the BB303 15 locomotive, which was towing KA 800, was heavily damaged, the cowhanger sank downwards and the body wall was crushed. The two front passenger train units of KA 800 were also heavily damaged and 2 axles of the first passenger train fell. Meanwhile, the BB304 25 locomotive, which was towing KA 1031, only suffered minor damage.
- On 3 March 2006, the fourth train with number K3 81 1 02 (former MCW 302 DMU) of Rangkasbitung–Jakarta Kota passenger train series pulled by locomotive BB304 18 suffered a broken roof and axle just as it was about to enter the Kebayoran Station yard because the weakened train was not strong enough to support passenger capacity that exceeds its capacity, this occurred at 06.30. The train has experienced a turbulence since departing from Pondok Ranji Station, but the train continues to run at high speed. About 300 meters after crossing Jalan Kebayoran Lama, the train began to shake violently and suddenly broke. 20 people were injured.
- On 26 June 2008, a series of coal trains PLB 8601 Cigading-Bekasi route pulled by locomotive BB304 22 experienced derailment on the switch at the Kebayoran Station yard (from Pondok Ranji Station), it occurred at 04.43 a.m. The train dispatcher at Kebayoran Station already knows that there was a problem with the switch machine, with the flashing switch on train dispatcher service desk, the train dispatcher cannot give a green signal to PLB 8601 to cross. The train dispatcher immediately checked directly the switch points condition, and made sure the switch points were in a tight position heading to track 2. The train dispatcher also propped up the open position of the switch tongue with a stone, with the aim that the correct position of the point points would not change again when a series of trains passed by. After returning to the room, the train dispatcher saw that the railroad switch light on the PPKA service desk was still flashing. Confident that the switch position was correctly pointing to track 2, Kebayoran Station train dispatcher contacted the control center so PLB 8601 was allowed to cross the Kebayoran Station yard slowly. When crossing the switch at a speed of 15 km/h, the 4 axles of the BB304 22 locomotive that was pulling PLB 8601 finally dropped, because it hit the tip of the switch tongue which was not in a tight position.

== Gallery ==
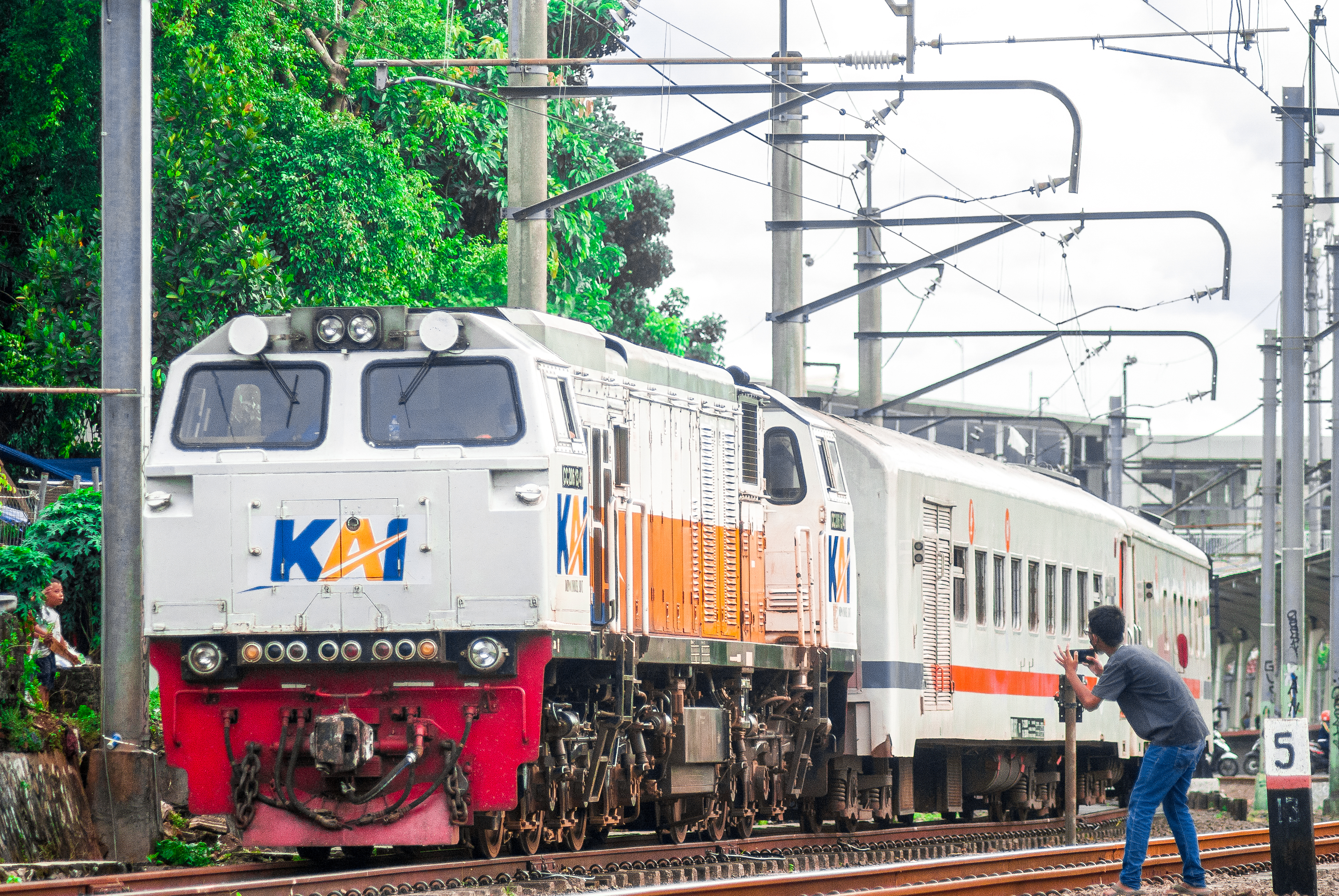
An extraordinary train (Kereta Luar Biasa or KLB) departing from Kebayoran station

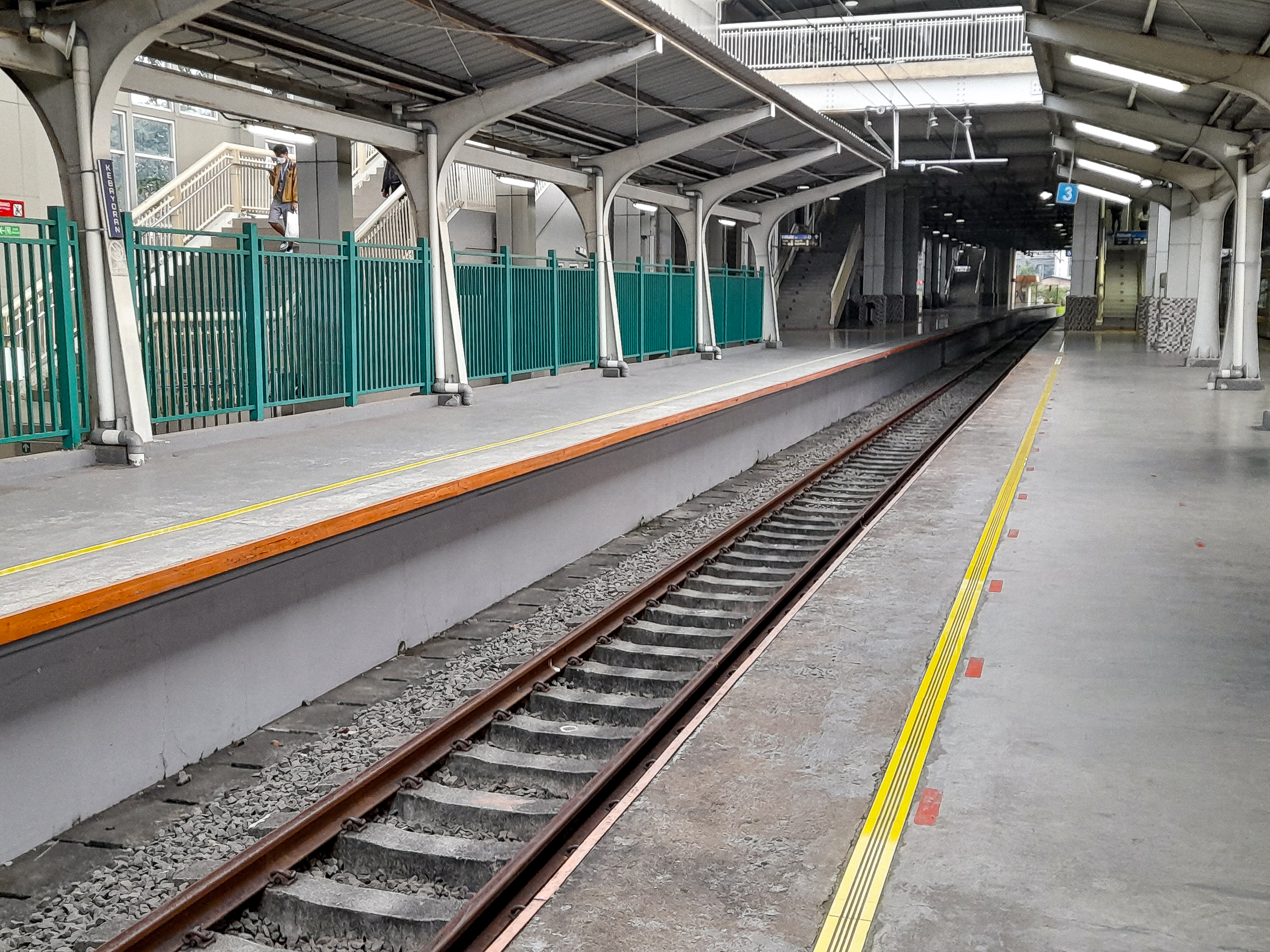
The side platform of the station

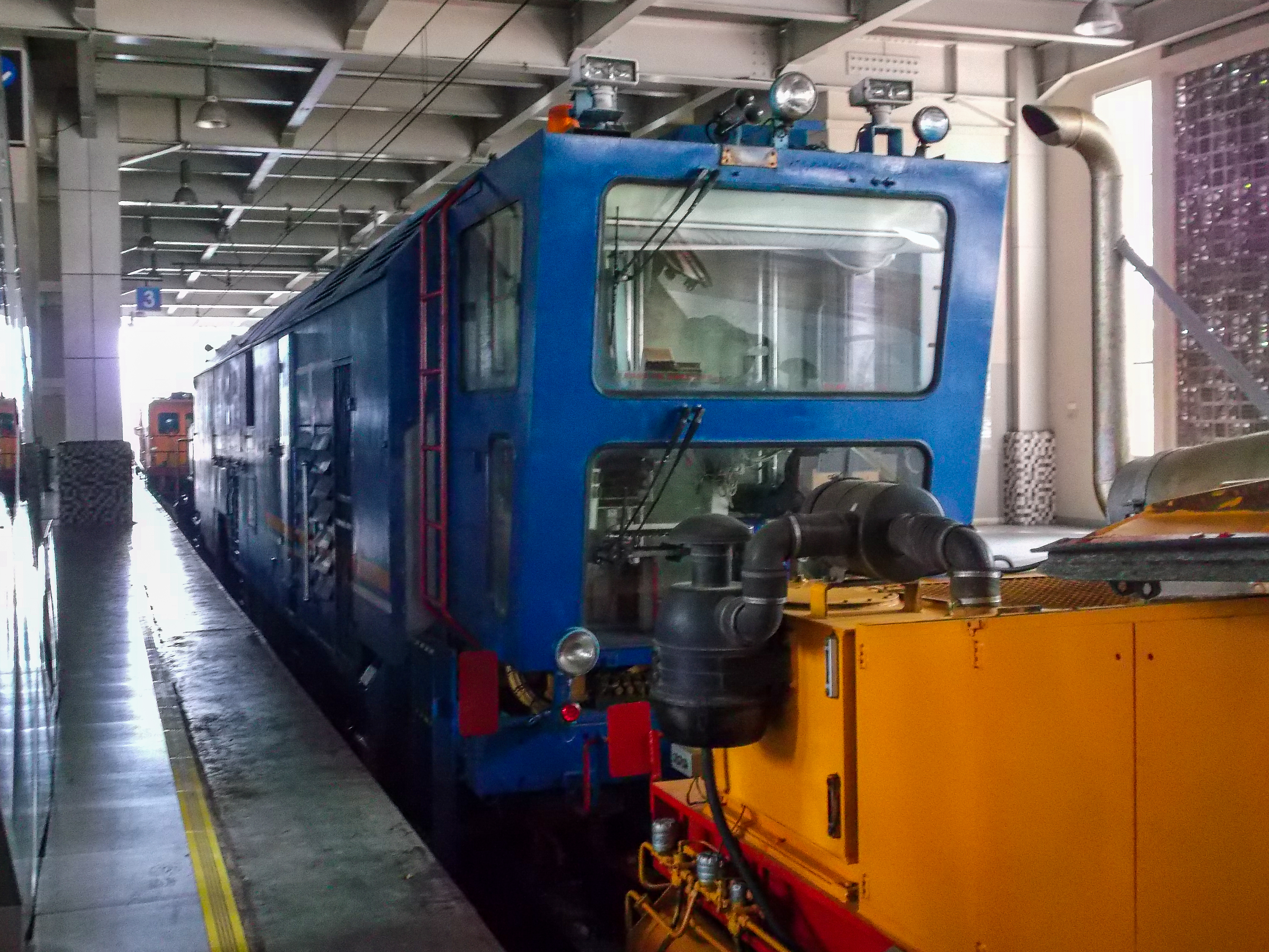
Plasser & Theurer maintenance train on line 3

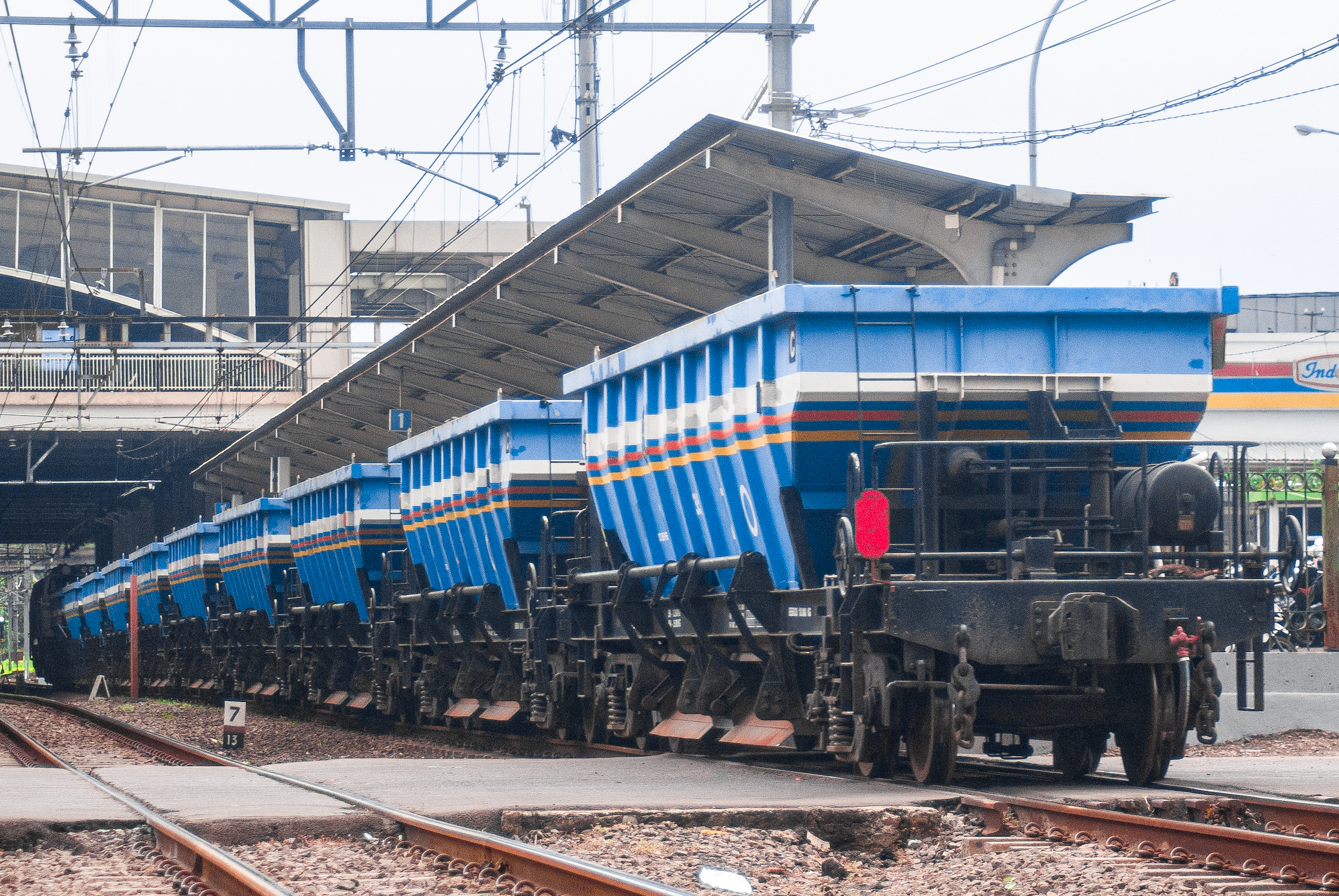
Train with carriages of ballast passing through Kebayoran Station

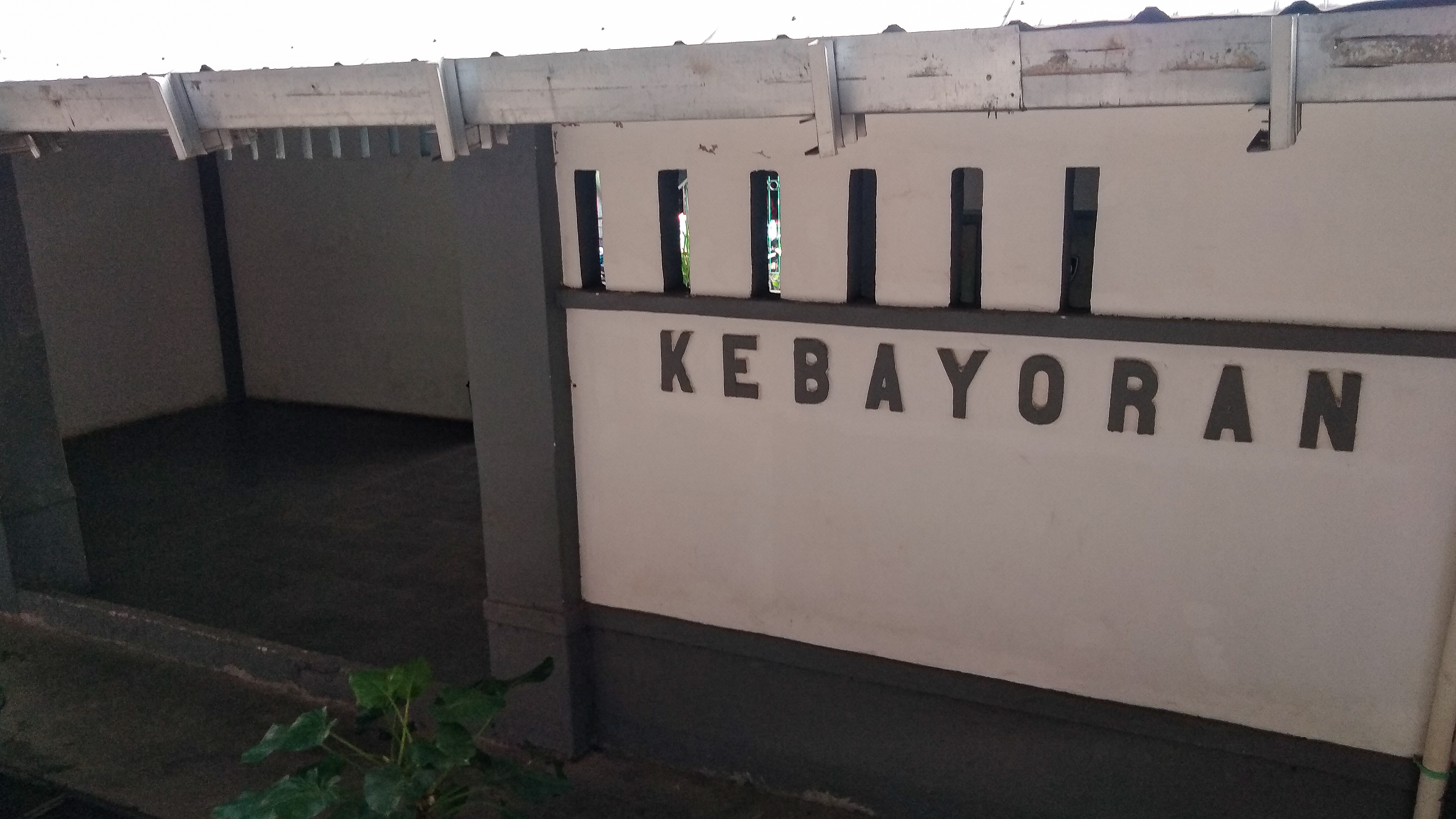
The station signage on the old building of the station

Preceding station	Kereta Api Indonesia	Following station
Pondok Ranji towards Merak	Merak–Tanah Abang	Palmerah towards Tanah Abang
