= 1987 Bintaro train crash =

Train crash in Indonesia

Coordinates: 6.2607°S 106.7613°E

Bintaro Train Crash
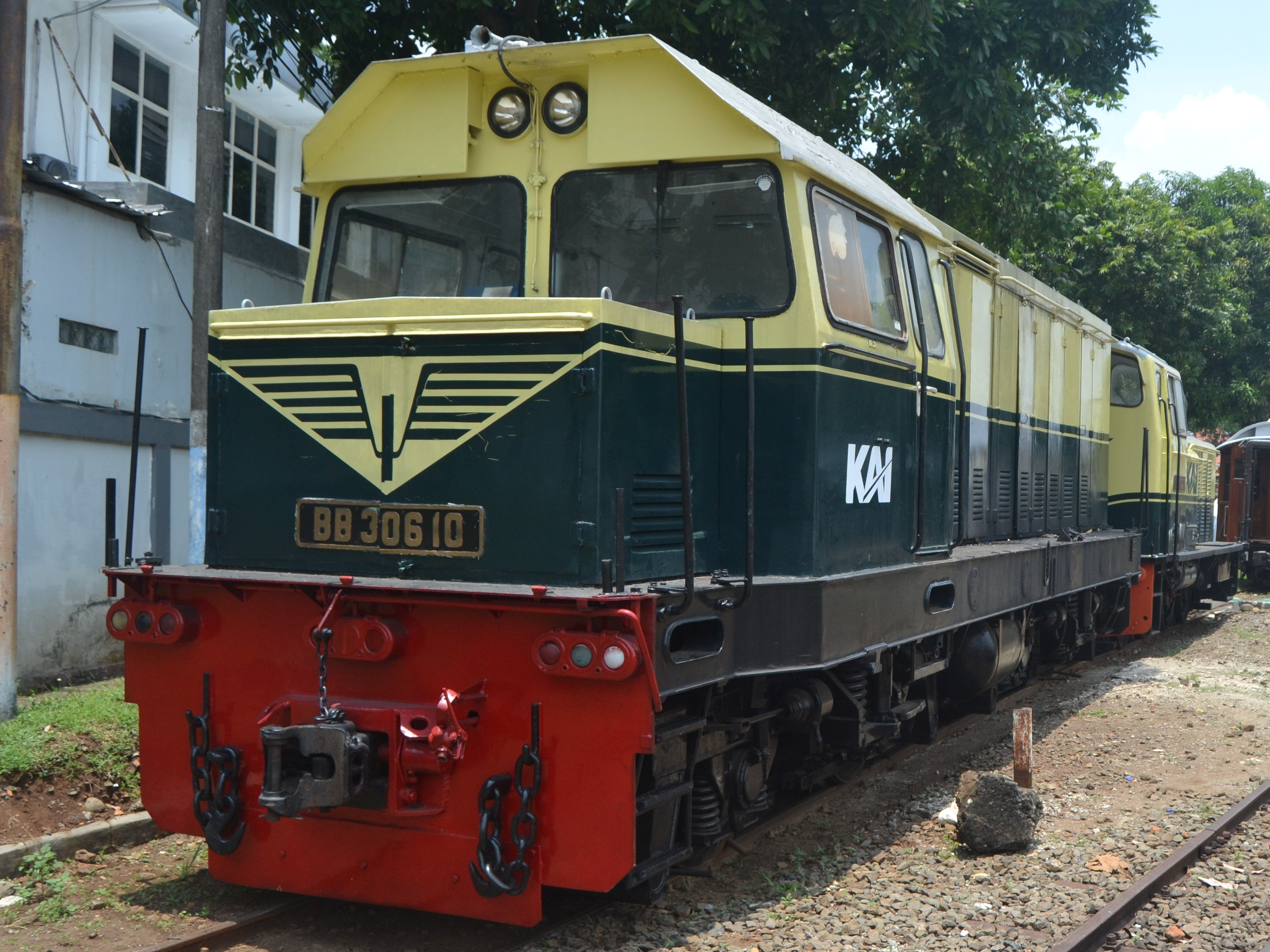
- A BB306 class locomotive in PJKA livery, similar to the locomotive in the accident

Details
- Date: 19 October 1987; 39 years ago 07:05
- Location: Bintaro, Jakarta
- Country: Indonesia
- Line: Tanah Abang - Rangkasbitung track
- Operator: Perusahaan Jawatan Kereta Api (now Kereta Api Indonesia)
- Incident type: Head-on collision
- Cause: Human error

Statistics
- Trains: 2
- Vehicles: PJKA BB303, BB306 class diesel locomotives
- Deaths: 139
- Injured: 254

On 19 October 1987, two trains collided in Pondok Betung urban village, Bintaro, South Jakarta, Indonesia. Two passenger trains collided, causing 139 fatalities, making it Indonesia's worst railway crash to this day, known as the Bintaro Tragedy I (Indonesian: Tragedi Bintaro I; the number is to distinguish from the crash in 2013).

A train departing from Rangkasbitung Station in West Java province (now in Banten) collided with a train from Tanah Abang Station in Jakarta. The investigation indicated negligence from a station officer who gave a safe signal to the train from Rangkasbitung without confirmation from Kebayoran Station. The safe signal was given because the lines at Sudimara Station were crowded.

== Location ==
The crash happened between Pondok Ranji Station (at the time was not yet built) and Tanah Kusir Cemetery, north of Public High School 86 (SMAN 86), Jakarta, near the Bintaro Highway curve, about 200 metres (660 ft; 220 yd) after the Pondok Betung crossing and 8 kilometres (5.0 mi) before Sudimara Station.

== Crash ==
The Serpong Stationmaster permitted KA 225 to leave for Sudimara Station without checking the railway condition at Sudimara Station. When the diesel-hydraulic train, KA 225 Rangkasbitung-Jakarta Kota, arrived in Sudimara Station at 6:45 AM (GMT+7) on 19 October 1987, the lanes were all filled with KA 225 in the first lane, KA Indocement in the second lane and a headless freight train.

KA 225 was intended to pass KA 220 Patas from Kebayoran to Merak. That meant KA 220 Patas at Kebayoran Station received lower priority for departure. Djamhari, the Sudimara Stationmaster, ordered KA 225's engineer to move his train to the first lane. This order were misinterpreted by the engineer as a go-ahead to continue the journey (compounded by an illegal boarder who hurriedly and wrongly confirms the engineer), and began to move the train.

Five minutes later, Djamhari was telephoned by Umrihadi, the officer from Kebayoran Lama Station, informing him that KA 220 Tanah Abang-Merak had departed for Sudimara. Djamhari, shocked seeing KA 225 leaving the station, tried in vain to chase KA 225 while waving the red flag as the train moved at 50km/h. A switcher boarded the rearmost carriage who tries to make it through the train and warn the engineer, to no avail due to the crowded condition. The two crowded trains collided head-on at Km +18.75, causing telescoping effect which killed most passengers in the carriage immediately behind locomotive. Both locomotives, Henschel-built BB303 and BB306, were also heavily damaged. The death toll came to 139 people, while hundreds more were injured.

== Criminal sanctions ==
The driver of KA 225, Slamet Suradio, survived the crash and was charged with negligence causing death. He received the maximum penalty of 5 years, which he felt was unfair as he was only following the Stationmaster's instructions. He received no pension, despite more than 20 years of service for the rail company. Upon release, he returned to his hometown of Purworejo in Central Java province and became a cigarette seller. He died on 3 June 2026, due to old age.

Adung Syafei, the conductor of KA 225, was sentenced to 2 years and 6 months in prison. Umrihadi of Kebayoran Lama Station was sentenced to 10 months in prison.

== Aftermath ==
Upon investigation by KNKT (Komite Nasional Keselamatan Transportasi, lit. National Transportation Safety Committee), the committee gave suggested recommendations to prevent similar accidents in the future. These included upgrading the signaling, which at the time was still using mechanical system, to a digital system, plus a review of PJKA's (now KAI) standard operating procedure. Also recommended was the construction of a new station between Kebayoran and Sudimara, the distance of which were considered extreme at over 13 km, to give a safety signal for passing train and reducing blind spots. The new station became the modern-day Pondok Ranji station, which opened in 1990.

== In popular culture ==
Iwan Fals wrote a song titled "19/10", referencing the date of the crash. Ebiet G. Ade was inspired by the disaster to write a song "Masih Ada Waktu" ("There's Still Time"). A film based on the collision, Tragedi Bintaro, was released in 1989.
