= 2013 Bintaro train crash =

Train crash in Indonesia

Bintaro rail crash
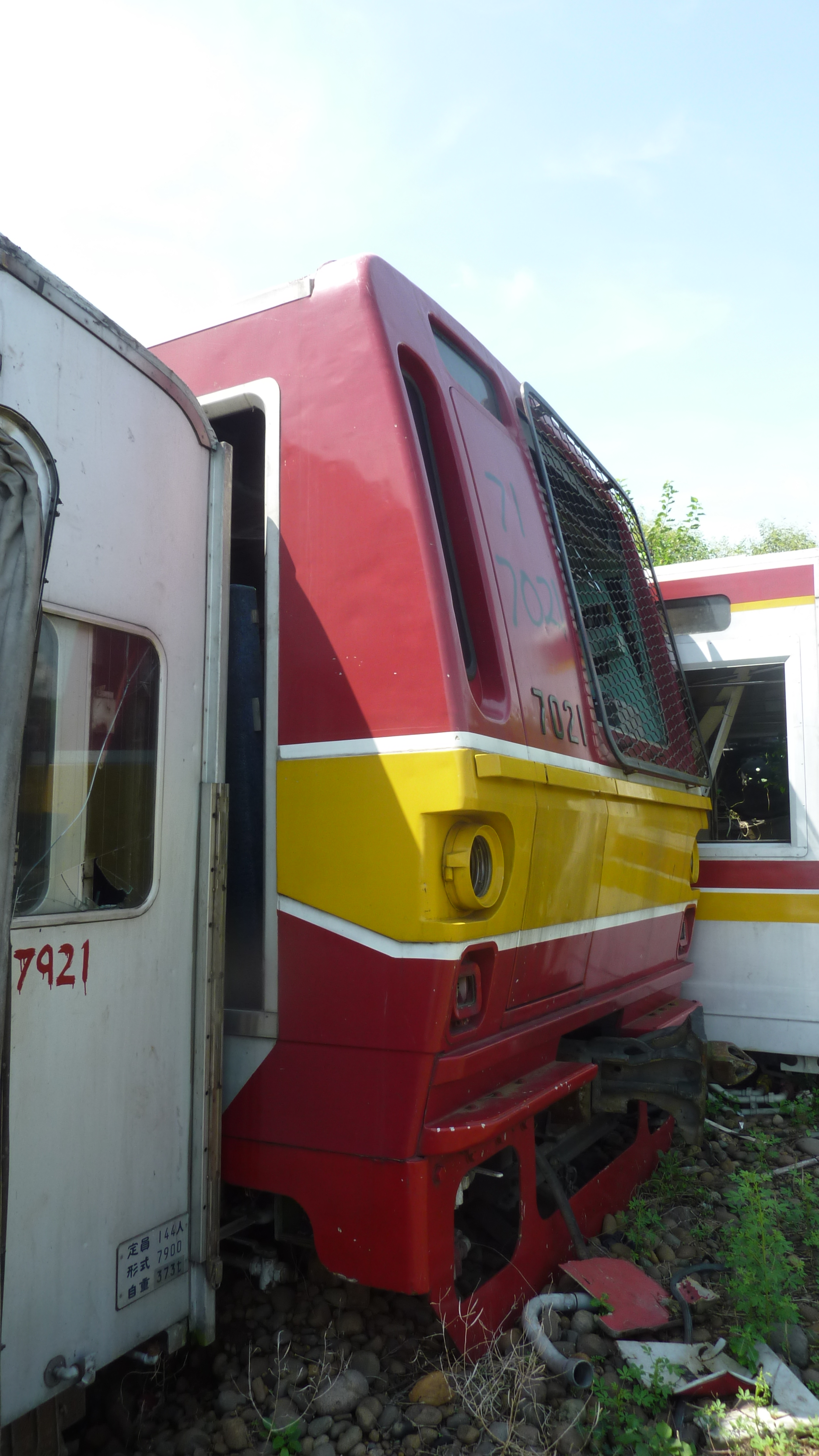
- Tokyo Metro 7121/7021 in Cikaum Station. This set were no longer in operation due to accident, where this set colliding the Pertamina fuel truck.

Details
- Date: 9 December 2013; 12 years ago 11:20 local time (04:20 UTC)
- Location: Bintaro, Jakarta
- Country: Indonesia
- Line: Serpong - Tanah Abang line
- Operator: KAI Commuter Jabodetabek
- Incident type: Collision with tanker truck (ram into a vehicle at a level crossing)
- Cause: Human Error

Statistics
- Trains: 1 (KAI KRL Commuter Train)
- Vehicles: 1 (Pertamina tanker truck)
- Passengers: 67
- Crew: 3 (driver, engine assistant, train technicians)
- Deaths: 7
- Injured: 63
- Damage: the first carriage specifically for the female train until the third carriage dropped and rolled to the right so that the driver's cabin was severely damaged and the tank cargo truck was severely burned

The 2013 Bintaro rail crash occurred on 9 December 2013 when a KRL Commuterline train crashed into a Pertamina gasoline tanker at a railroad crossing in Bintaro, Jakarta, Indonesia on a Monday morning, causing at least one female-only carriage to overturn and burst into flames. At least 7 people were killed (including the three train drivers) and another 63 were wounded in the crash.

The Tokyo Metro 7121/7021 was eventually retired and scrapped in December 2014.

== See also ==
- 1987 Bintaro train crash
