= Cisauk =

Coordinates: 6°20′S 106°39′E

- Town and district
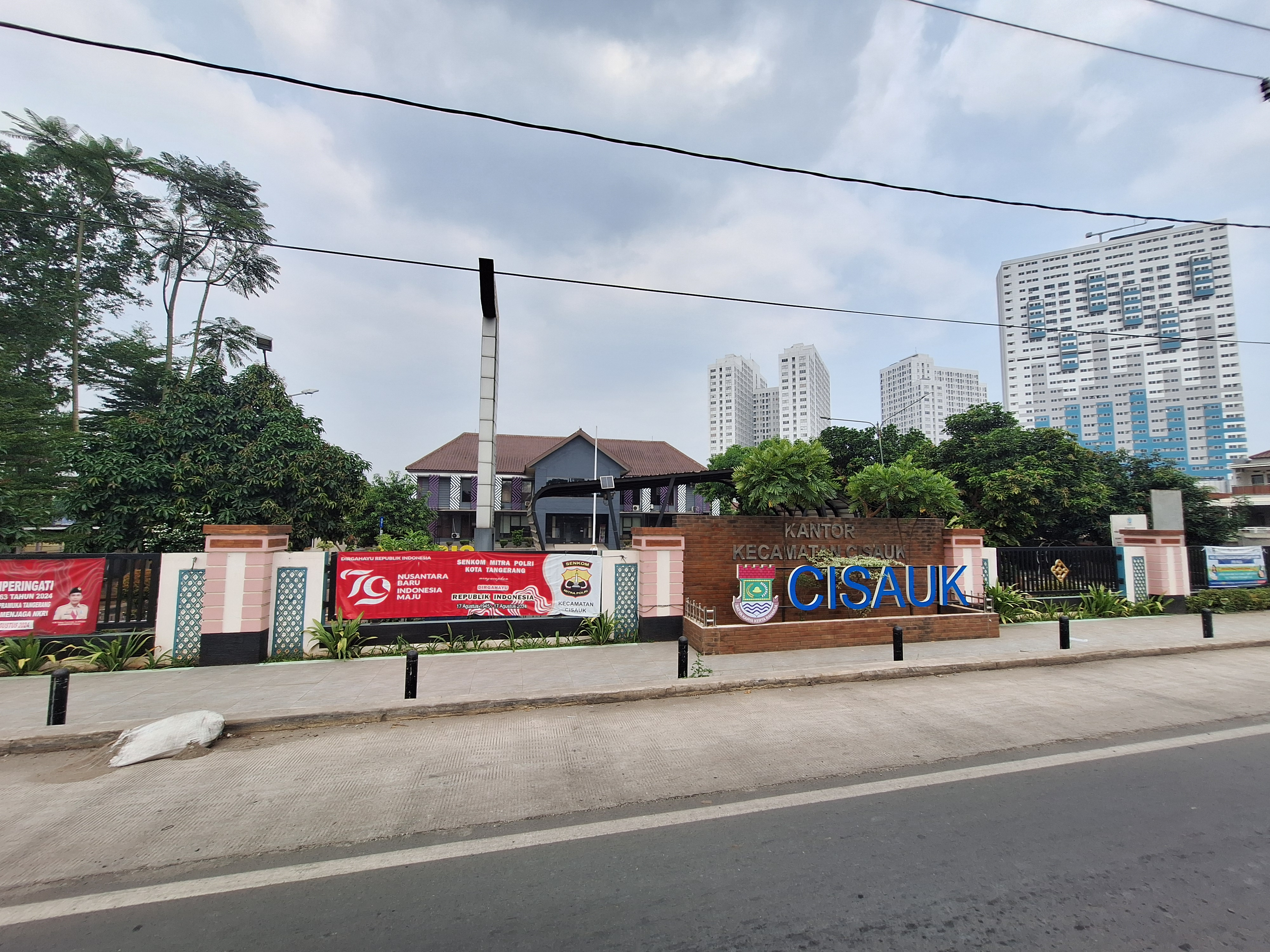
- Cisauk Regent office
- Interactive map of Cisauk
- Country: Indonesia
- Province: Banten
- Regency: Tangerang Regency
- Established: 29 November 2000

Area
  - Total: 30.05 km^{2} (11.60 sq mi)

Population (mid 2024 estimate)
  - Total: 97,204
  - Density: 3,235/km^{2} (8,378/sq mi)

Cisauk is a town and an administrative district (kecamatan) located in the Tangerang Regency of Banten Province on Java, Indonesia.

Cisauk was previously part of Serpong District before it was split off from the eastern part of that district on 29 November 2000.

The district covers an area of 30.05 km^{2} and had a population of 64,083 at the 2010 Census and 90,846 at the 2020 Census; the official estimate as of mid-2024 was 97,204 (comprising 49,232 males and 47,972 females). The district centre is at Sampora, and the district is sub-divided into the town (kelurahan) of Cisauk and five villages (desa), listed below with their areas and their officially-estimated populations as of mid-2024, together with their post codes.

Cisauk is one of the districts which forms part of BSD City; it has malls like The Breeze, and has Toll access.

Kode Wilayah	Name of Kelurahan or Desa	Area in sq. km	Pop'n mid 2024 estimate	Post code
36.03.23.2003	Mekar Wangi	4.51	8,800	15340
36.03.23.2009	Dangdang	5.08	8,215	15342
36.03.23.2005	Suradita	7.10	32,926	15343
36.03.23.1001	Cisauk (town)	5.13	17,997	15341
36.03.23.2006	Sampora	4.74	9,912	15345
36.03.23.2011	Cibogo	3.49	19,354	15344
36.03.23	Totals	30.05	97,204	

== Transportation ==
- Rangkasbitung Line includes Cisauk Railway Station and Cicayur Railway Station
- BSD Link by BSD City
