= Cicayur railway station =

Railway station in Banten, Indonesia

R10 Cicayur station Stasiun Cicayur
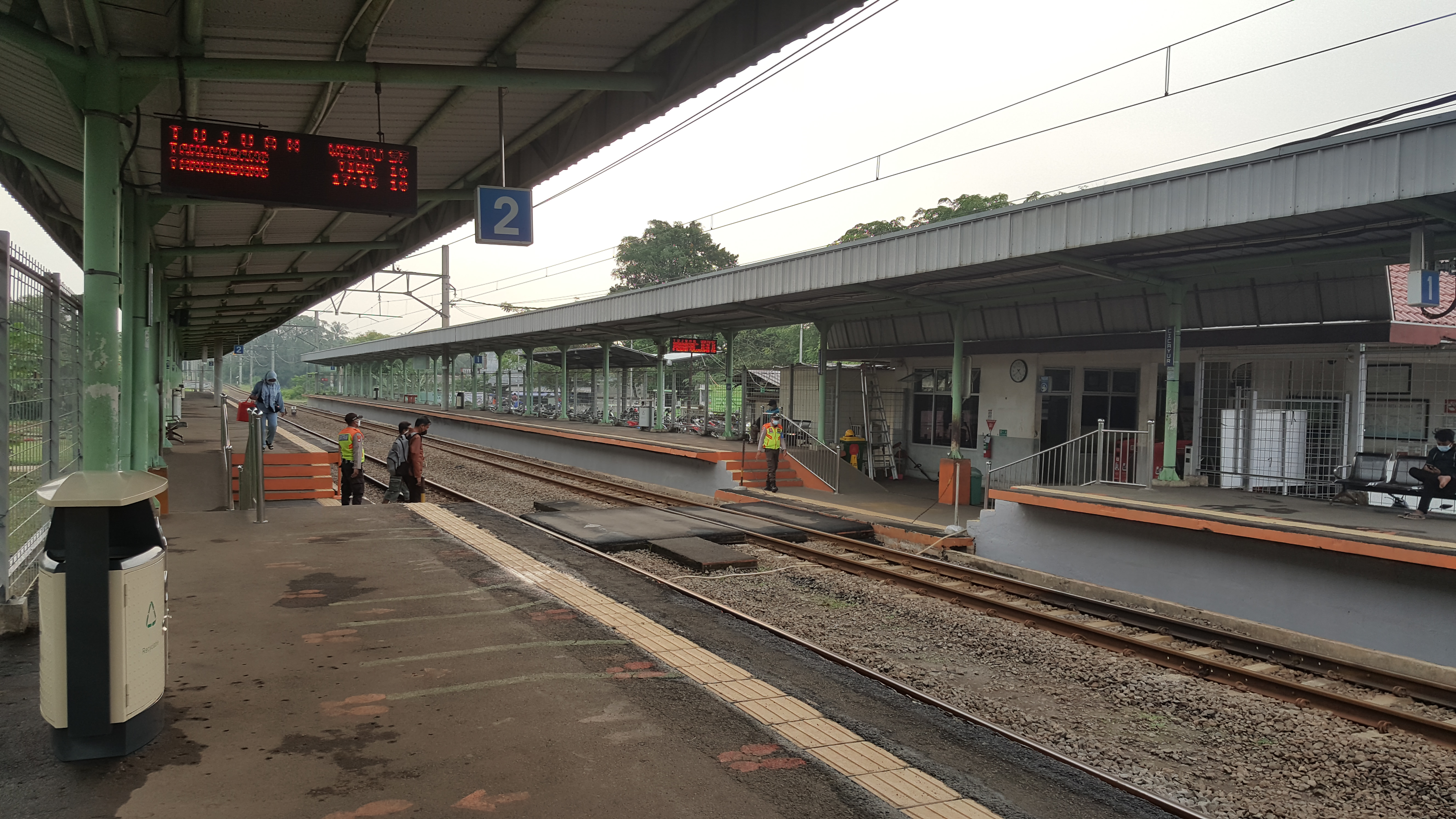
- Cicayur station building in 2022

General information
- Location: Cisauk, Tangerang 15341; Banten; Indonesia
- Coordinates: 6.331389°S 106.619167°E
- Elevation: +47 m
- Owner: Kereta Api Indonesia
- Operator: KAI Commuter
- Lines: Rangkasbitung Line; Merak–Tanah Abang
- Platforms: 2 side platforms
- Tracks: 2

Construction
- Structure type: At-grade
- Parking: Available
- Accessible: Available

Other information
- Station code: CC • 0208
- Classification: Class III/small

History
- Rebuilt: 2012
- Electrified: 2009

Services
Preceding station		Following station
Cisauk towards Tanah Abang	Rangkasbitung Commuter Line	Jatake towards Rangkasbitung
Location

Cicayur Station (CC) is a class III/small train station located in Cisauk, Tangerang Regency. This station only serves KRL Commuter Line at an altitude of +48 m. The name of this station is taken from the village where this station is located, namely Cicayur Village on the border of Cisauk District and Pagedangan District in Tangerang Regency.

Electrification of the Serpong-Parungpanjang segment of this line has been carried out since 2008-2009.

== Building and layout ==
Initially, this station was a small stop that only served local trains and only had one track. Currently, the station building, along with Cikoya Station, has been replaced with a new building for safety and comfort reasons for Commuter Line passengers. The old building has been moved to the Ambarawa Railway Museum and has been in the museum's collection since 2012. Since the Serpong–Parungpanjang double track project was completed in 2012, The layout of this station was also changed by adding two high side platforms and adding one more track.

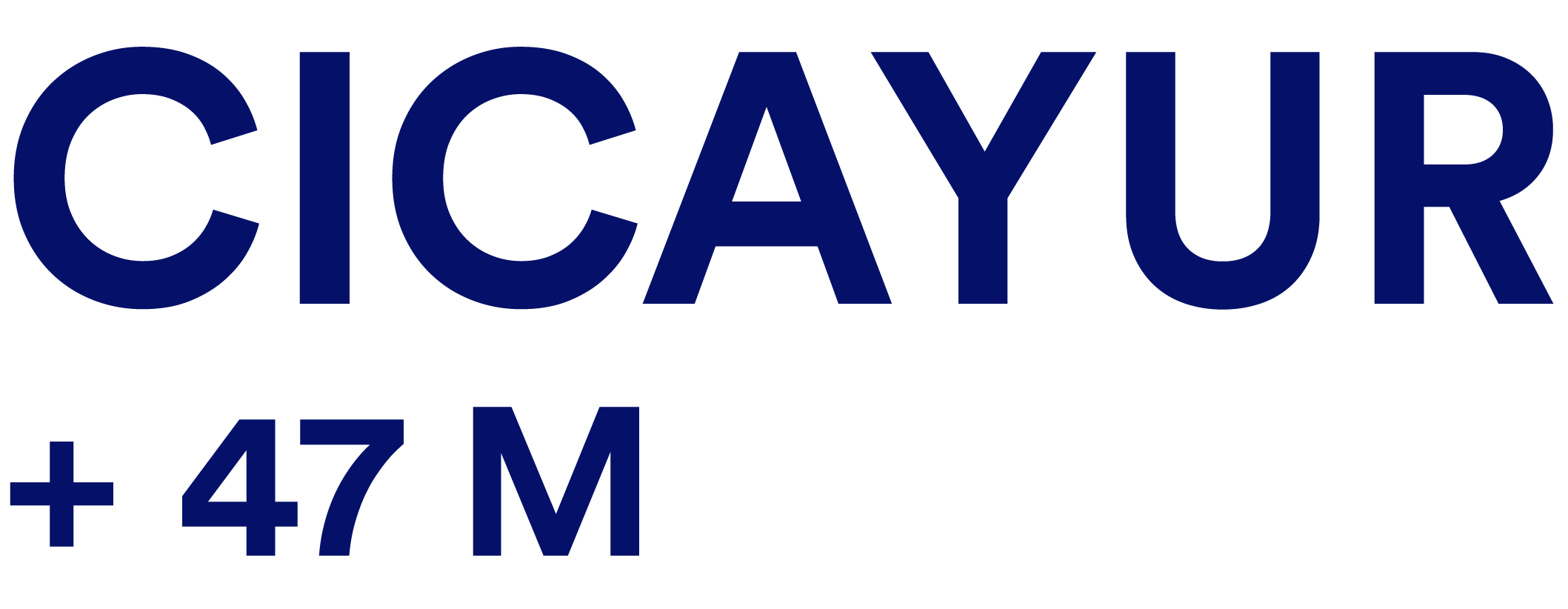
R10
G	Main building	
Platform floor	Side platform, the doors are opened on the right side	
Platform floor	Line 1	← (Jatake) Rangkasbitung Line to Parung Panjang/Tigaraksa/Rangkasbitung
Platform floor	Line 2	Rangkasbitung Line to Tanah Abang (Cisauk) →
Platform floor	Side platform, the doors are opened on the right side	
G	Main building	

== Services ==
The following is a list of train services at the Cicayur Station.

- KRL Commuterline
  - Green Line, towards Tanah Abang and Parung Panjang (Parung Panjang branch)
  - Green Line, towards Tanah Abang and Tigaraksa (Tigaraksa branch)
  - Green Line, towards Tanah Abang and Rangkasbitung (Rangkasbitung branch)

== Gallery ==
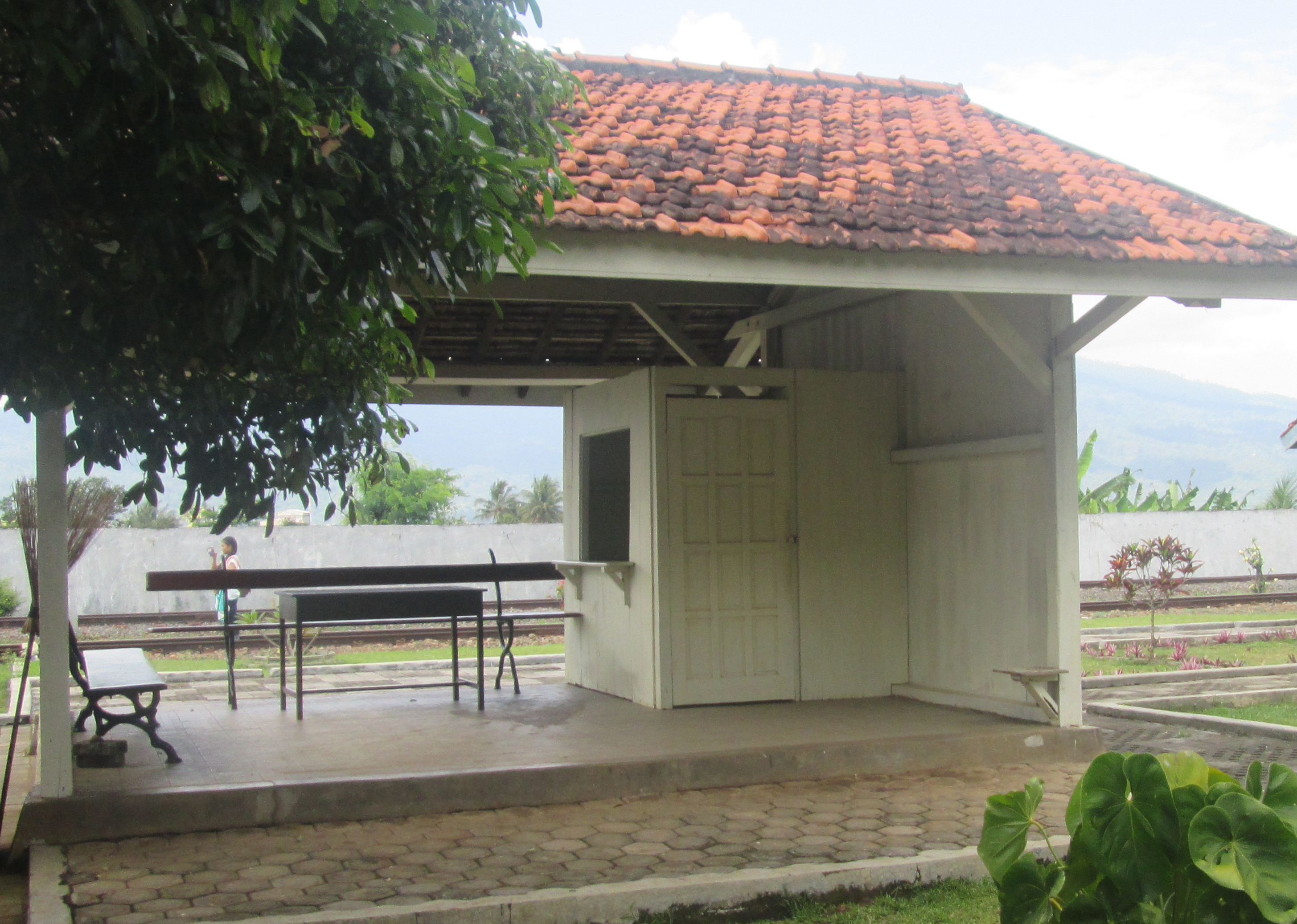
Cicayur station old building 2016

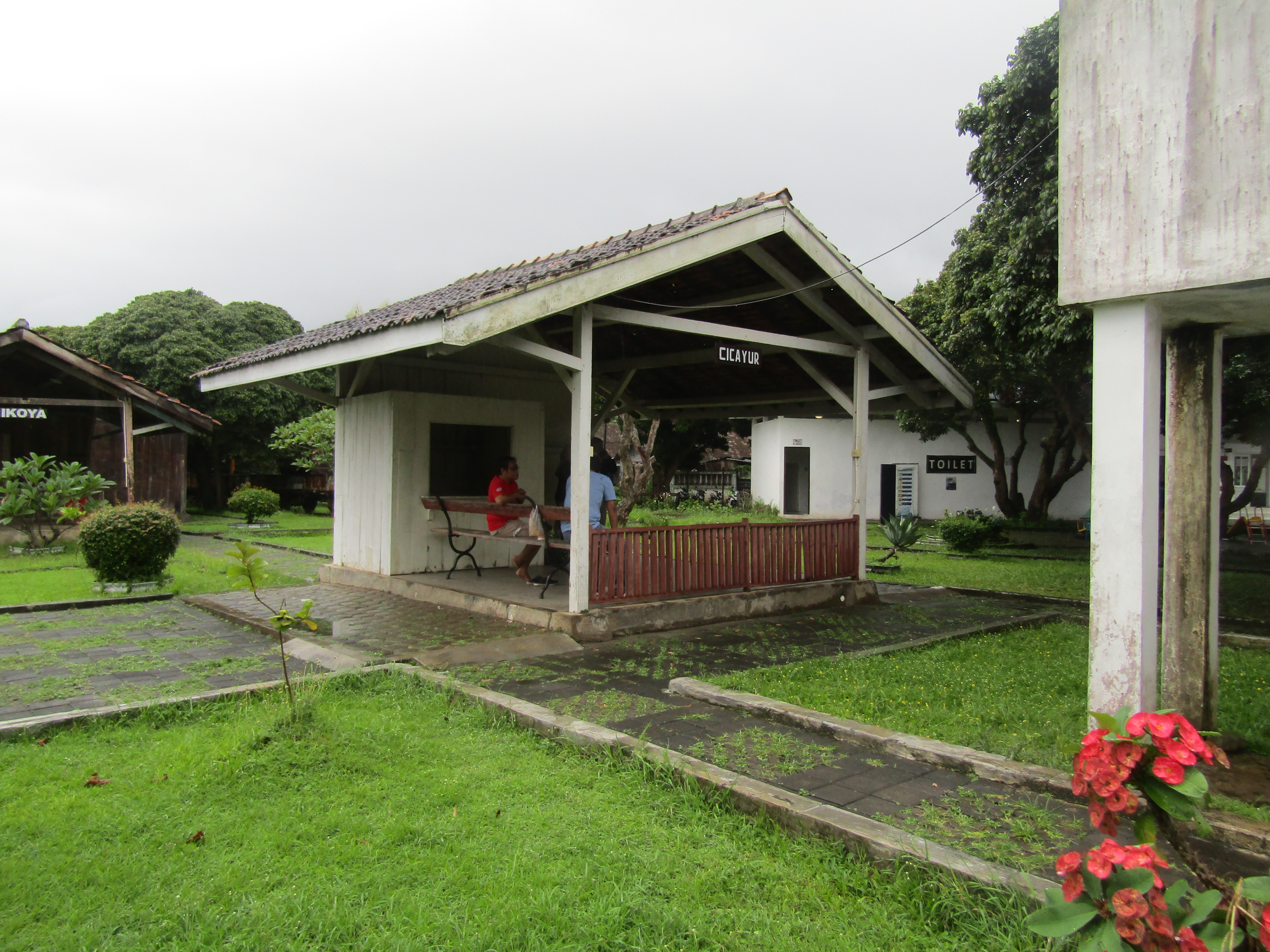
Cicayur station old building, 2022, after being moved to the Ambarawa Railway Museum.
