= Jatake railway station =

Railway station in Indonesia

R11 Jatake Station Stasiun Jatake
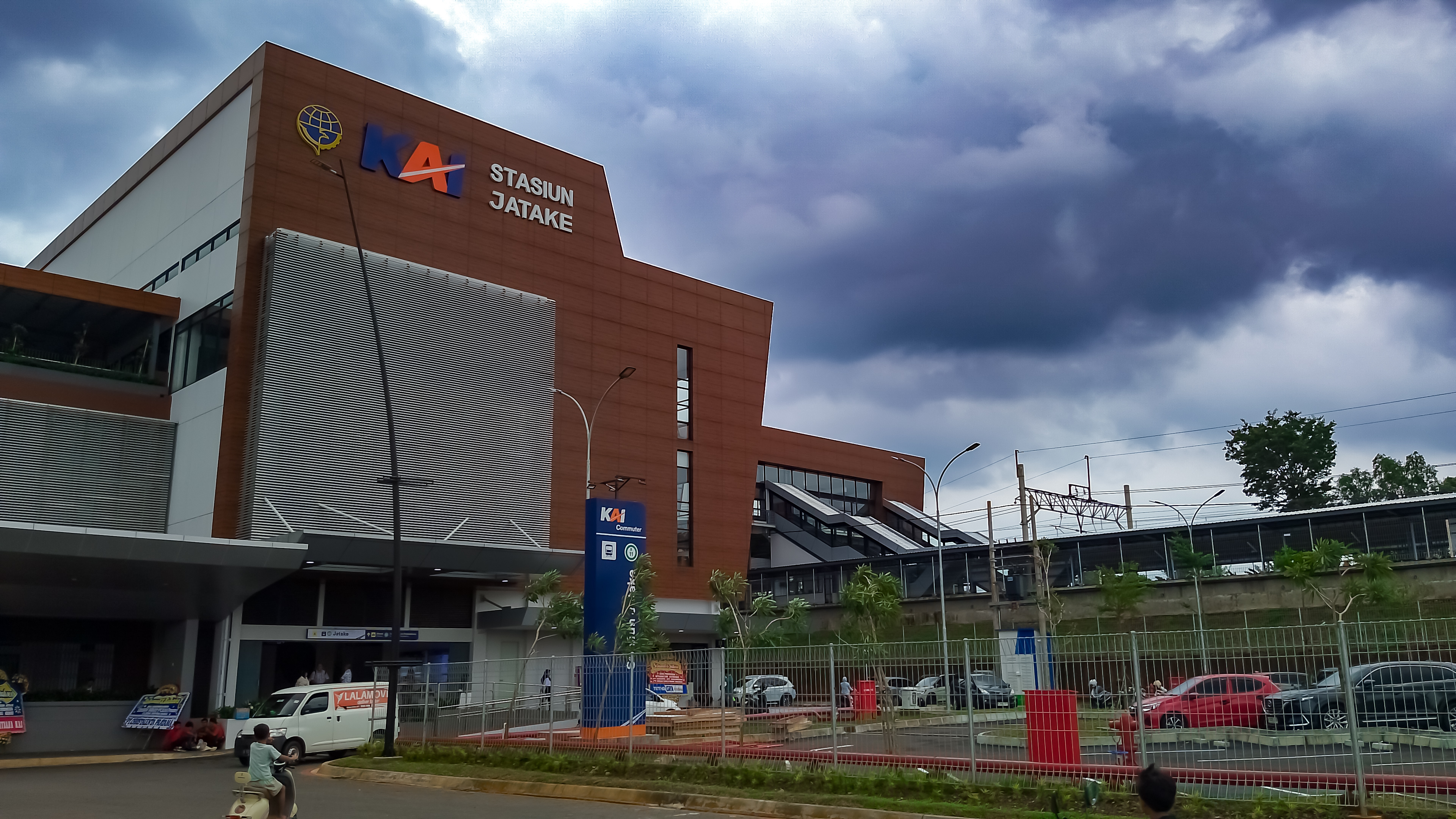
- Front view, 2026

General information
- Location: Alamanah 2 St., Jatake, Pagedangan, Tangerang Regency, Banten, Indonesia
- Coordinates: 6.334755°S 106.606389°E
- Elevation: +56m
- System: KRL Commuterline
- Owner: Kereta Api Indonesia (KAI)
- Operator: KAI Commuter
- Line: Rangkasbitung Line
- Platforms: Two side platforms
- Tracks: 2

Construction
- Structure type: At-grade
- Parking: Available
- Accessible: Yes
- Architectural style: Modern

Other information
- Station code: JTK

History
- Opened: 28 January 2026

Passengers
- 5,000 (in first 4 days of operation)

Services
Preceding station		Following station
Cicayur towards Tanah Abang	Rangkasbitung Commuter Line	Parung Panjang towards Rangkasbitung
Location

Jatake Station (JTK) is a railway station located at the Jatake village of Pagedangan, Tangerang Regency, Banten, Indonesia, only serving the Rangkasbitung Line of the KRL Commuterline towards Tanah Abang (Jakarta) and Rangkasbitung (Lebak Regency) stations. It is part of the expansion project of BSD City, a planned township developed by Sinar Mas Land and also its subsidiary, and was opened in January 2026.

== History ==
Jatake station was conceived to provide transit access to the new development areas of BSD City within Jatake village as part of their third phase of expansion. A memorandum of understanding (MoU) was signed by BSD City and Kereta Api Indonesia on 29 November 2020. On 30 March 2024, Jatake station construction officially broke ground by Transportation Minister Budi Karya Sumadi. Physical construction was completed by mid-2025. On 28 January 2026, Jatake station was officially opened and inaugurated by the Governor of Banten Andra Soni, the new Transportation Minister Dudy Purwagandhi, and CEO of KAI Bobby Rasyidin. Within four days after inauguration, the station has served roughly 5,000 passengers.

== Building and layout ==
Jatake station is built on 2,435 m^{2} of land, and its building has a tropical modern architecture. It consists of a pair of 300-metre-long side platforms, with overhead bridge available for cross-platform access.

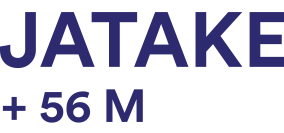
R11
G	Main building
Platform floor	Side platform, the doors are opened on the right side
Platform floor	Line 1	← (Parung Panjang) Rangkasbitung Line to Tigaraksa/Rangkasbitung
Platform floor	Line 2	Rangkasbitung Line to Tanah Abang (Cicayur) →
Platform floor	Side platform, the doors are opened on the right side

== Services ==
- KRL Commuterline
  - Green Line, towards Tanah Abang and Parung Panjang (Parung Panjang branch)
  - Green Line, towards Tanah Abang and Tigaraksa (Tigaraksa branch)
  - Green Line, towards Tanah Abang and Rangkasbitung (Rangkasbitung branch)

== Gallery ==
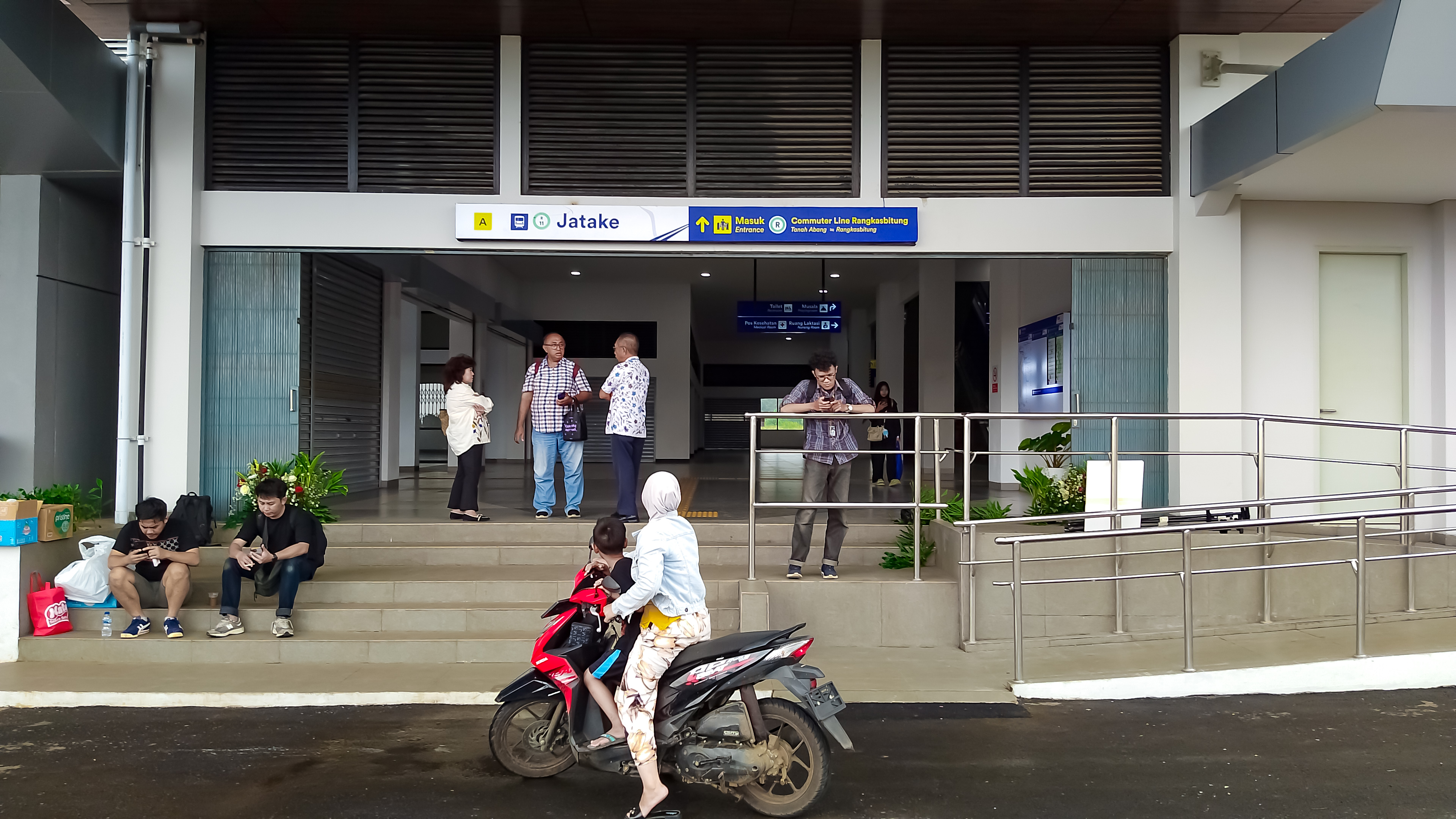
The entrance lobby

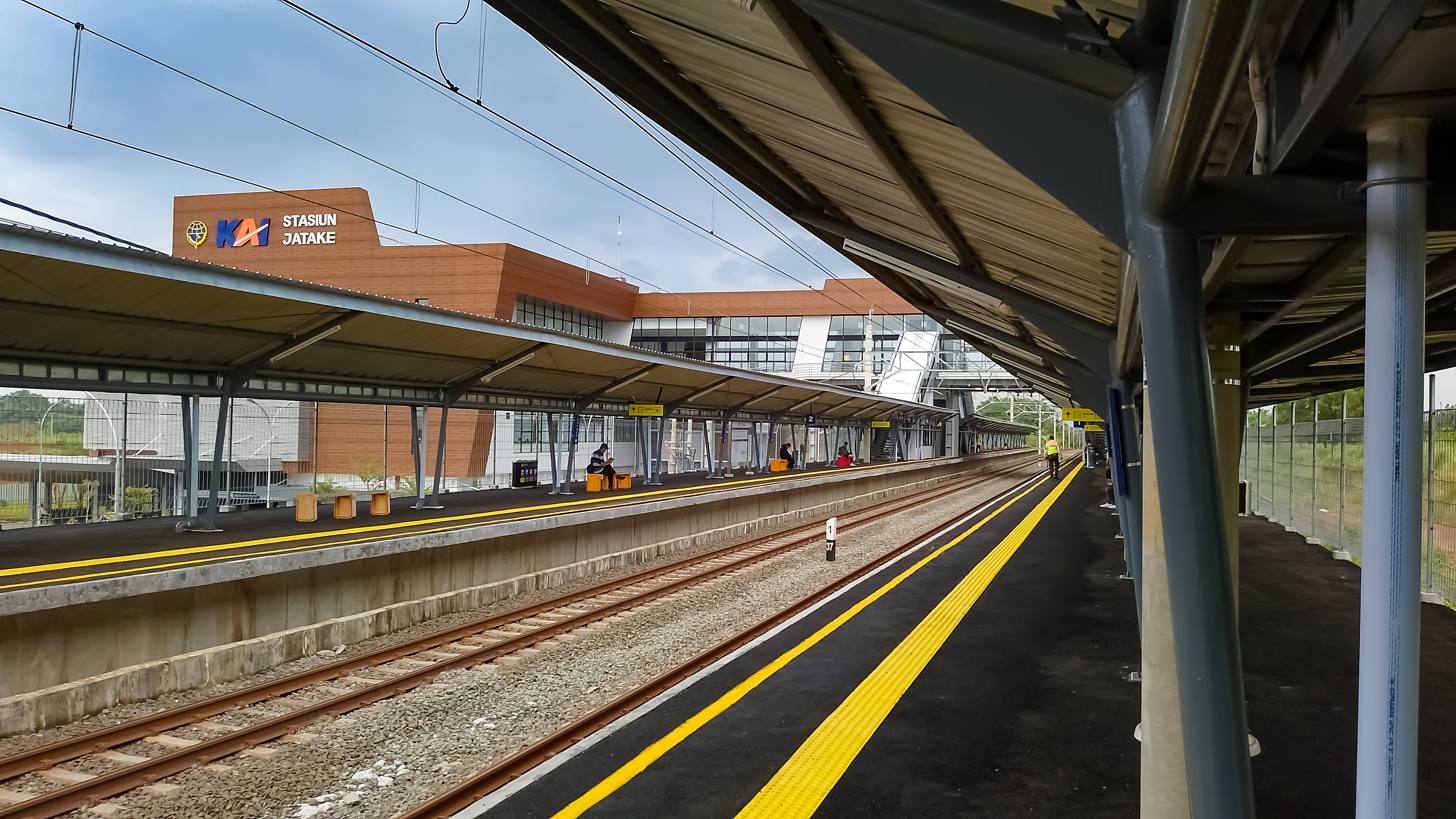
The emplacement and platform area

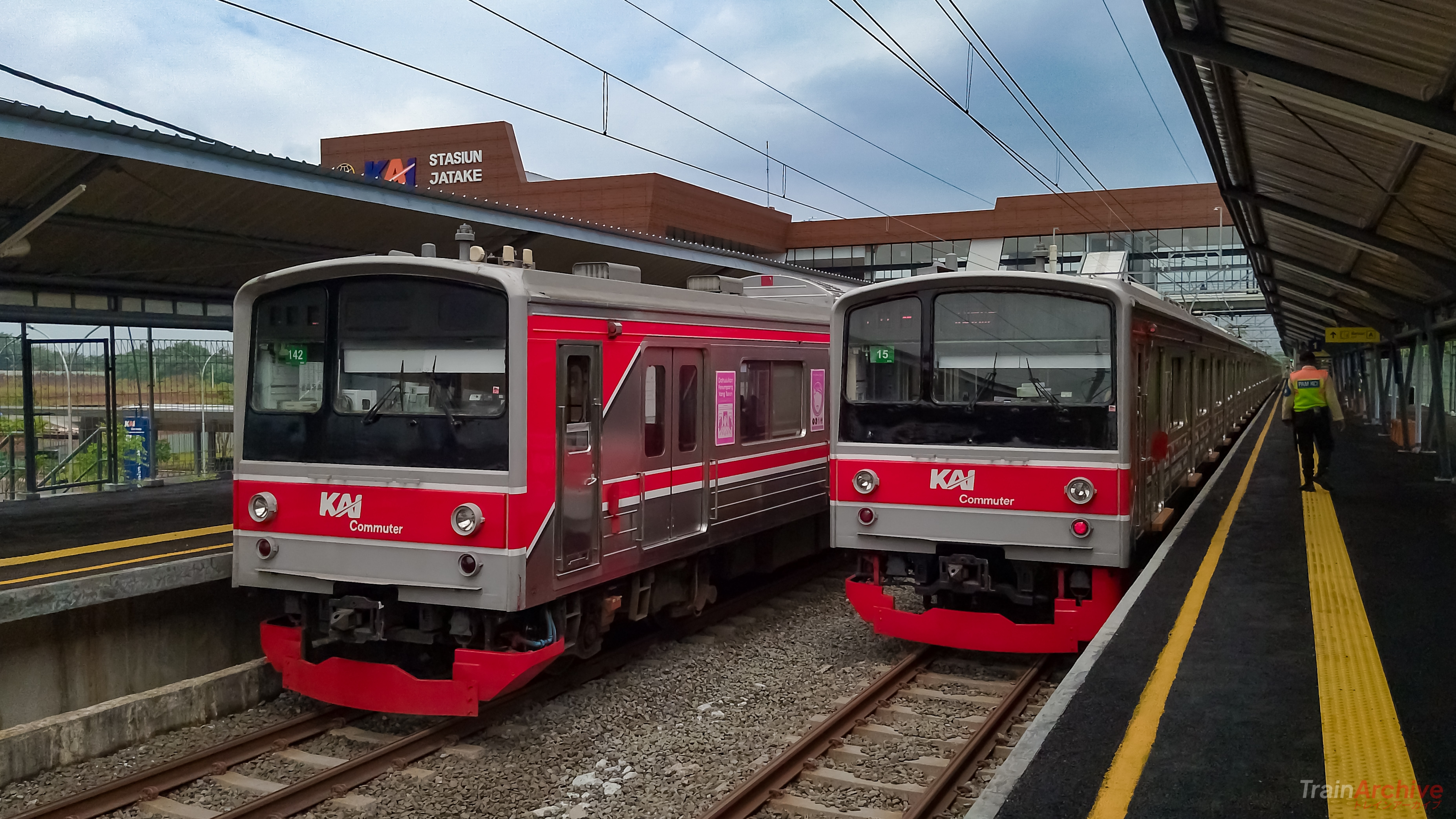
Ex-JR East 205 series rolling stocks at Jatake station

Preceding station	Kereta Api Indonesia	Following station
Parung Panjang towards Merak	Merak–Tanah Abang	Cicayur towards Tanah Abang
