= Cisauk railway station =

Railway station in Indonesia

Coordinates: 6.3245°S 106.6416°E

R09 Cisauk Station Stasiun Cisauk
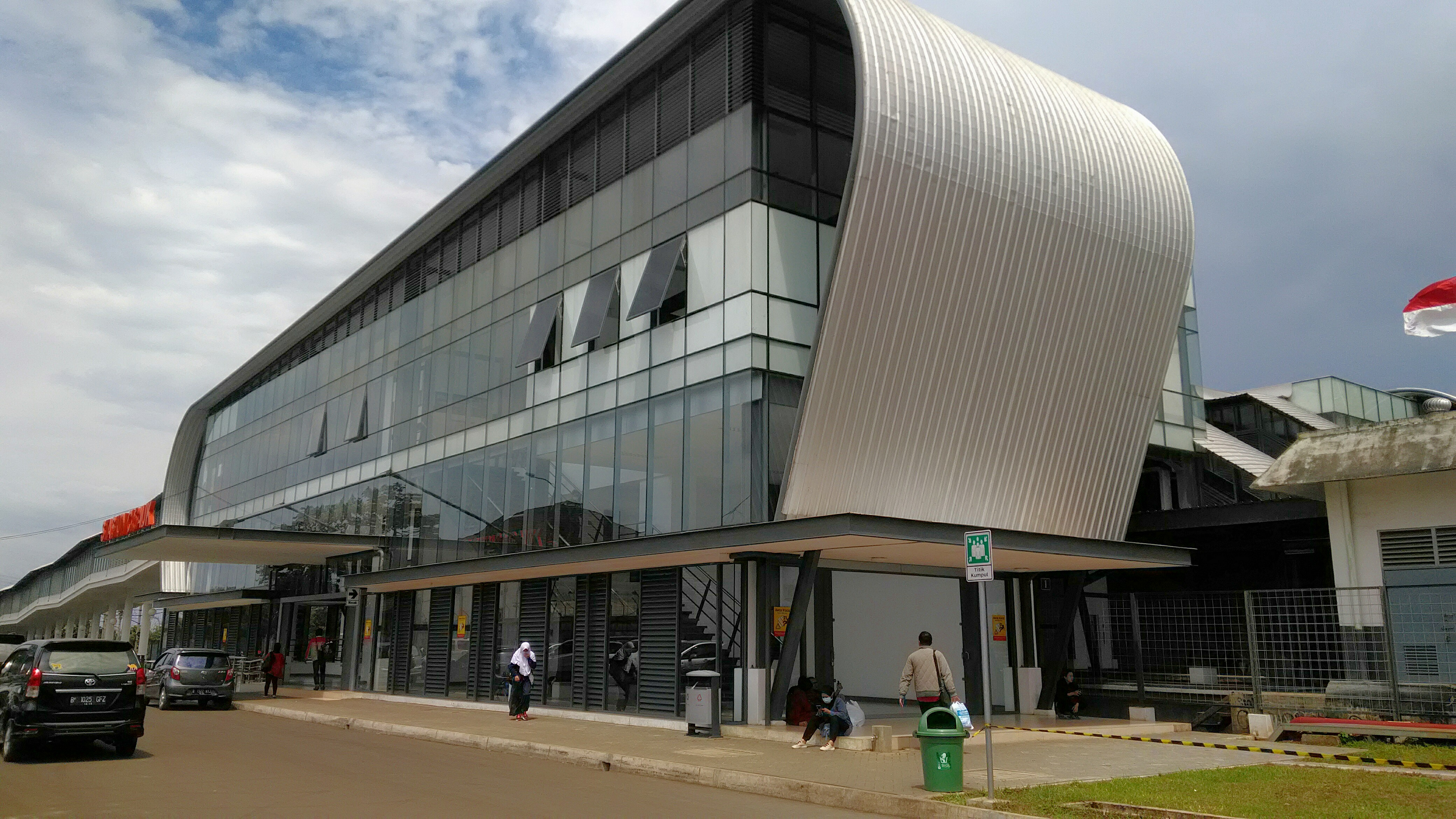
- Cisauk Station new building

General information
- Location: Jalan Stasiun Cisauk Cibogo, Cisauk, Tangerang Regency, Banten 15344, Indonesia
- Elevation: +48m
- Owner: Kereta Api Indonesia
- Manager: Kereta Api Indonesia; KAI Commuter
- Line: Rangkasbitung Line
- Platforms: Two side platforms
- Tracks: 2

Construction
- Parking: Available
- Accessible: Yes

Other information
- Station code: CSK • 0209
- Classification: Class III

History
- Opened: 1901
- Electrified: 2009
- Former names: Tjisaoek
- Original company: Staatsspoorwegen

Services
Preceding station		Following station
Serpong towards Tanah Abang	Rangkasbitung Commuter Line	Cicayur towards Rangkasbitung
Location

Cisauk Station (CSK) is a class III railway station located on the border between Sampora, Cisauk and Cibogo Village, Cisauk, Tangerang Regency, Banten, Indonesia. The station, which is located at an altitude of +48 meters and only serves KRL Commuterline Rangkasbitung Line, is the most southeastern train station in Tangerang Regency. It is also located near the BSD City complex, as well as Indonesia Convention Exhibition within the planned city.

== History ==
In order for the mobility of passengers from Batavia to Rangkasbitung to the Banten area to run more smoothly, in the 1890s the Staatsspoorwegen company built a railroad line and its stations (including Cisauk Station in 1901, which at that time was still a railway stop) that connected the Duri Station to Rangkasbitung, passing through the Tanah Abang. This project was completed in 1899, and regular trains serving the route were immediately started.

Initially Cisauk Station had a total of 3 lines. During the time when the Tanah Abang–Rangkasbitung railway was a single track, line 1 was a straight track and track 2 was a turning track, these two lines were used for passing and crossing trains, until finally line 2 also became a straight track after the double track project or double track segment from Serpong–Parung Panjang was completed in 2012. There is also a buffer stop line that is a dead end at the station building (from the direction of Serpong Station), this line which was still in use until 2015 was usually used for loading and unloading, yards, and storage or stabling a series of carriages transporting stone fragments, until finally the buffer stop line was dismantled and the freight train service for transporting stone fragments at this station ceased to exist.

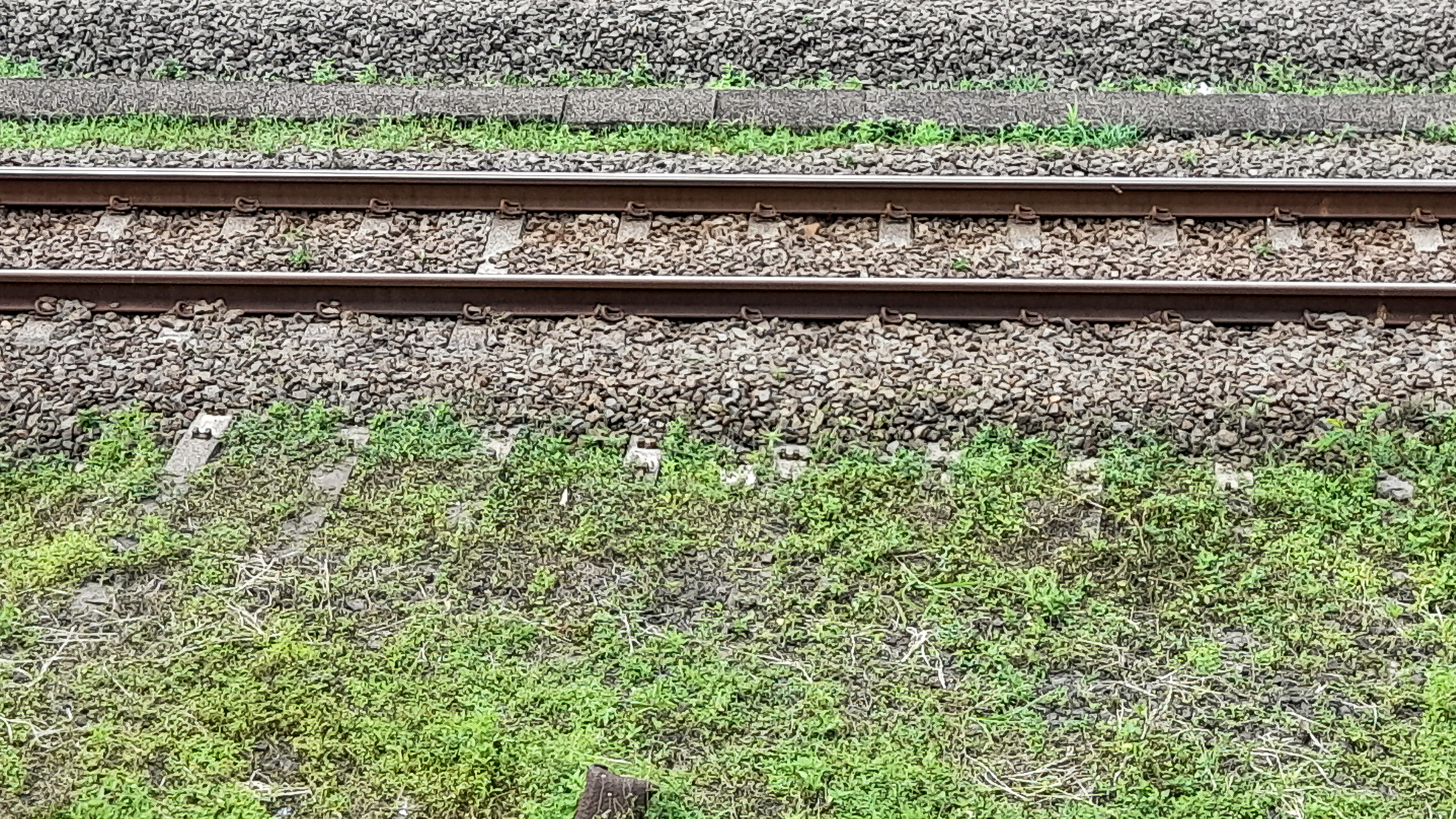
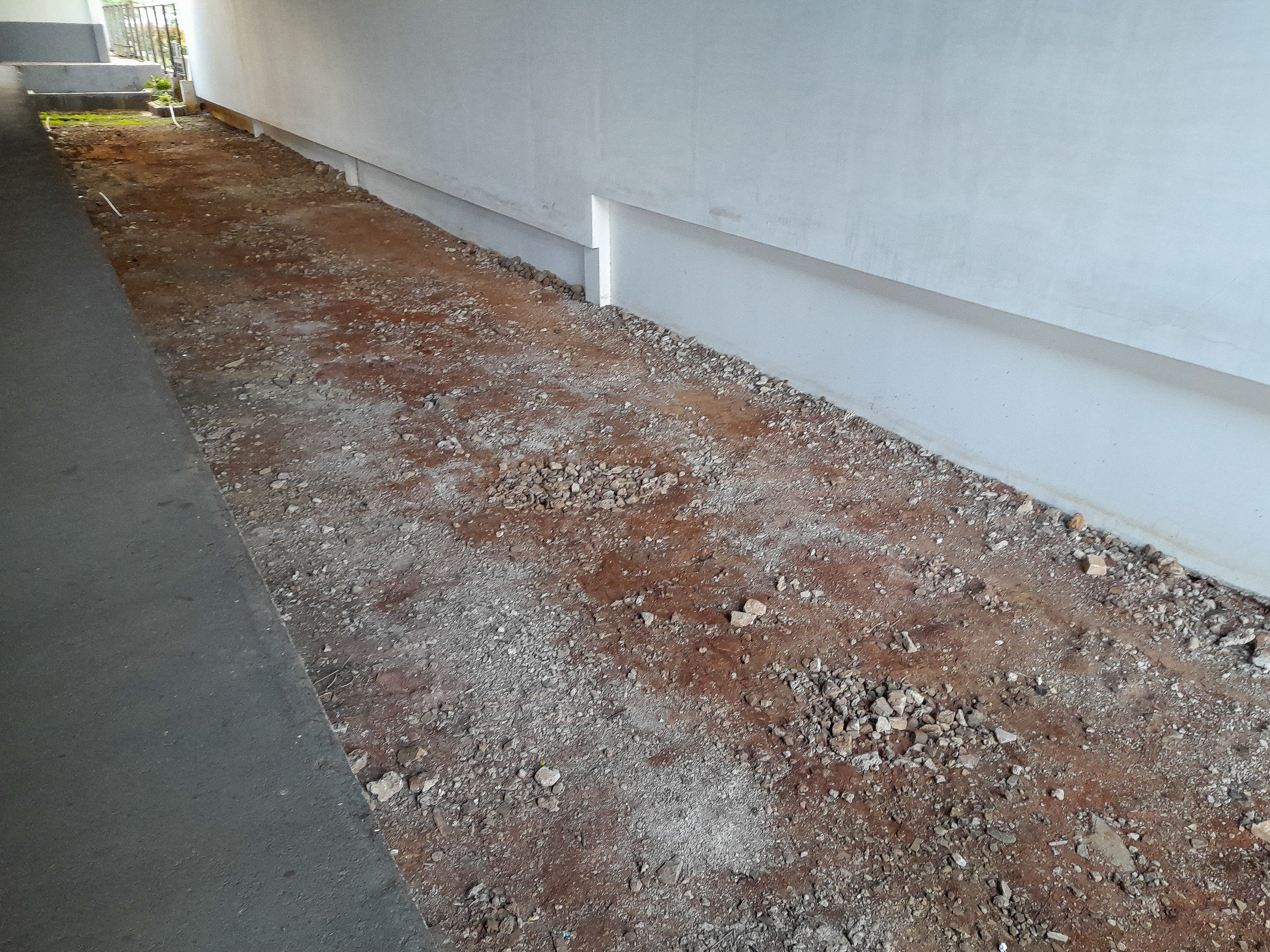
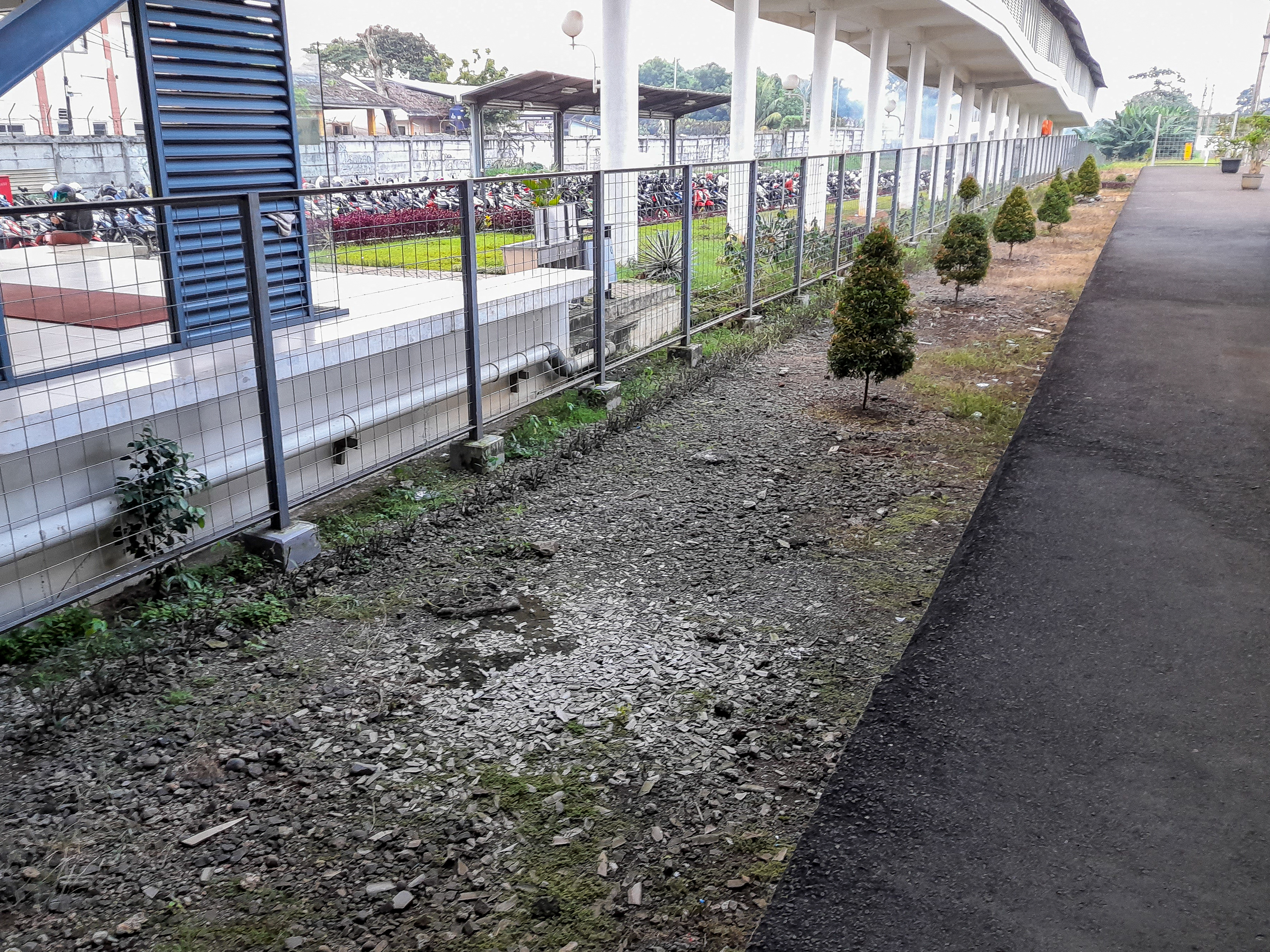
The remainings of the buffer stop line railbed

As of 1 February 2019, Cisauk Station has completed a major renovation to become a modern and spacious station. The new station building was built to accommodate long train cars (12 trains cars) and has more complete and international standard facilities. It has a futuristic minimalist architectural style, complete with special facilities for breastfeeding women, toilets, disabled facilities, and skybridge.

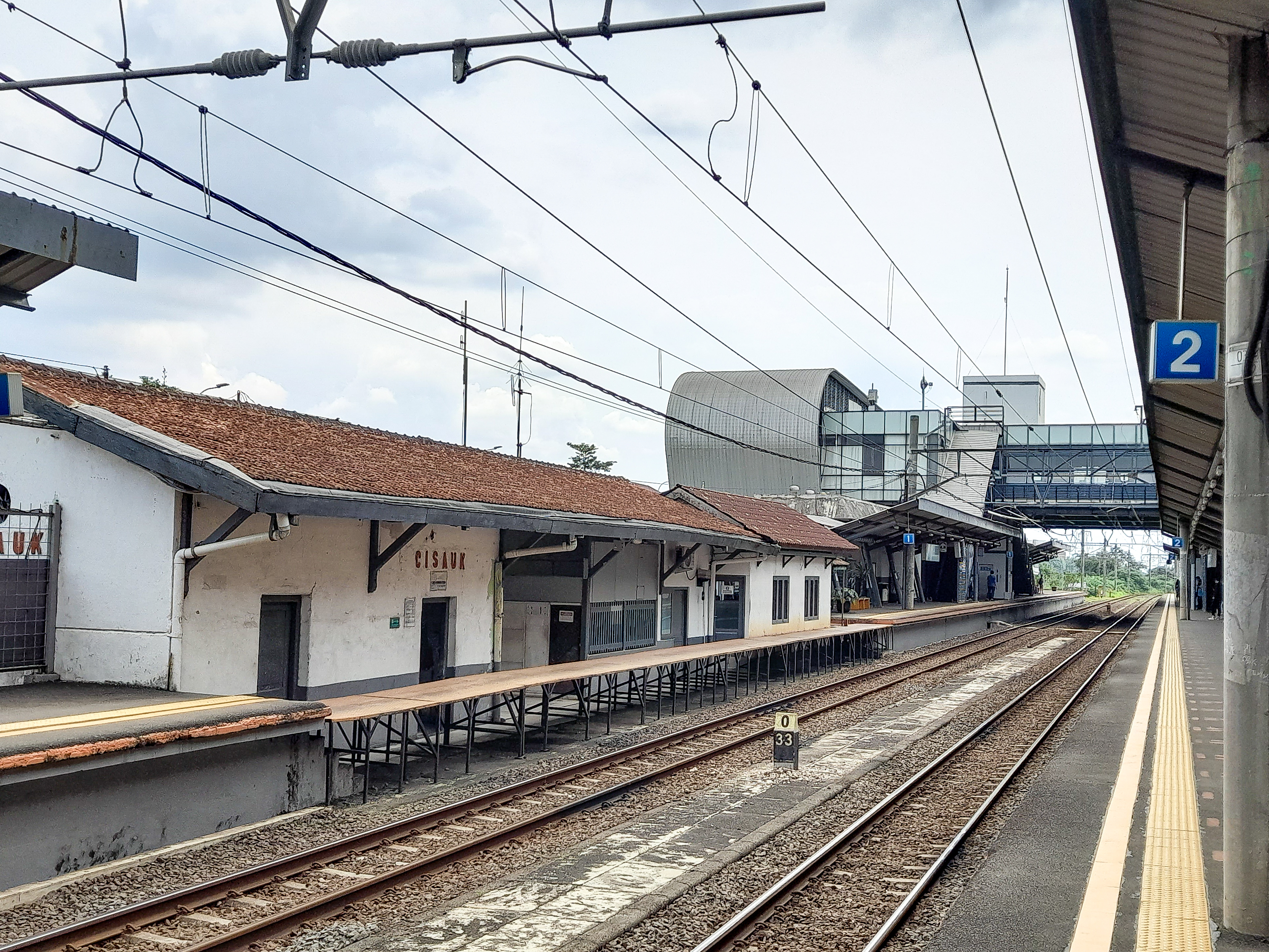
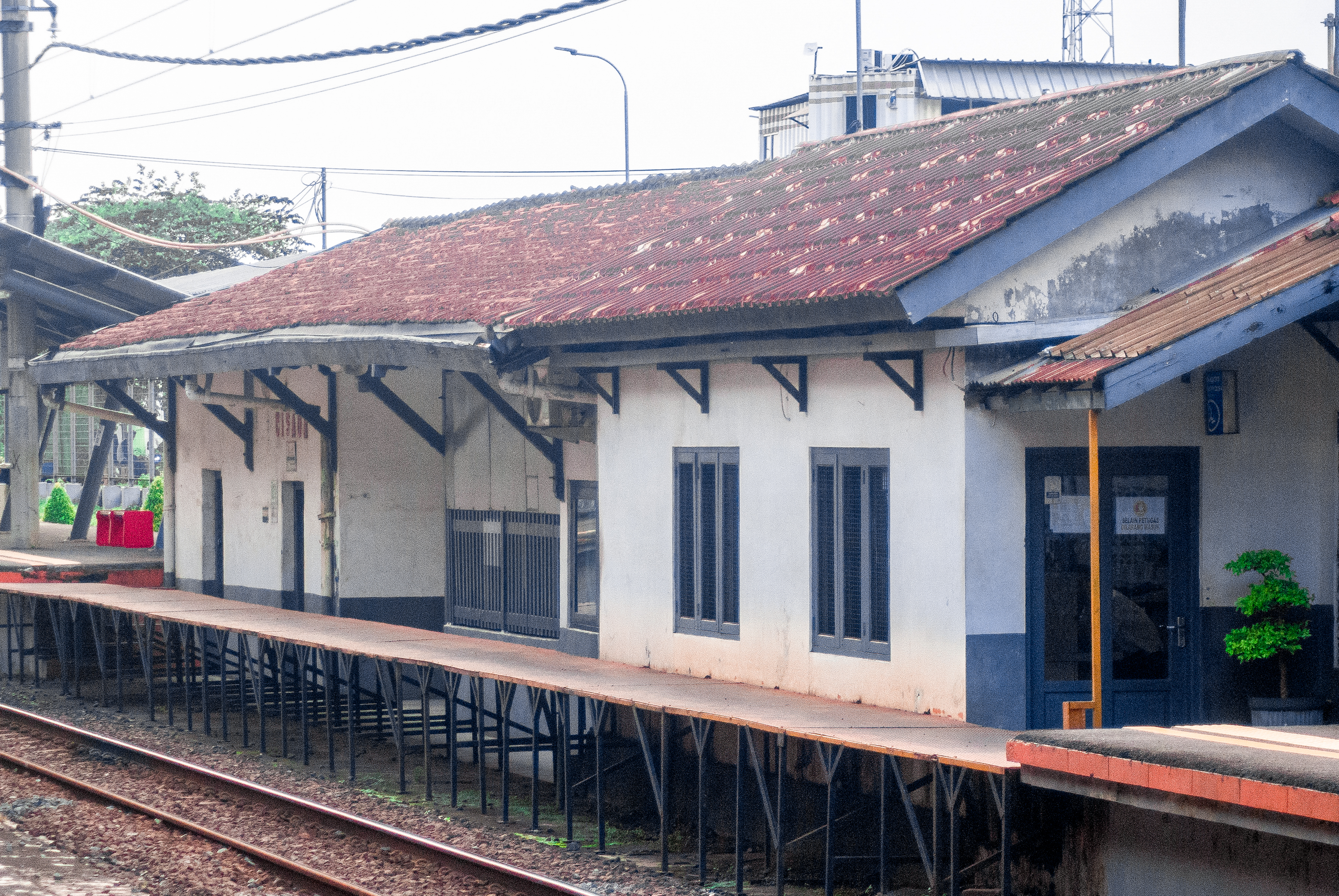
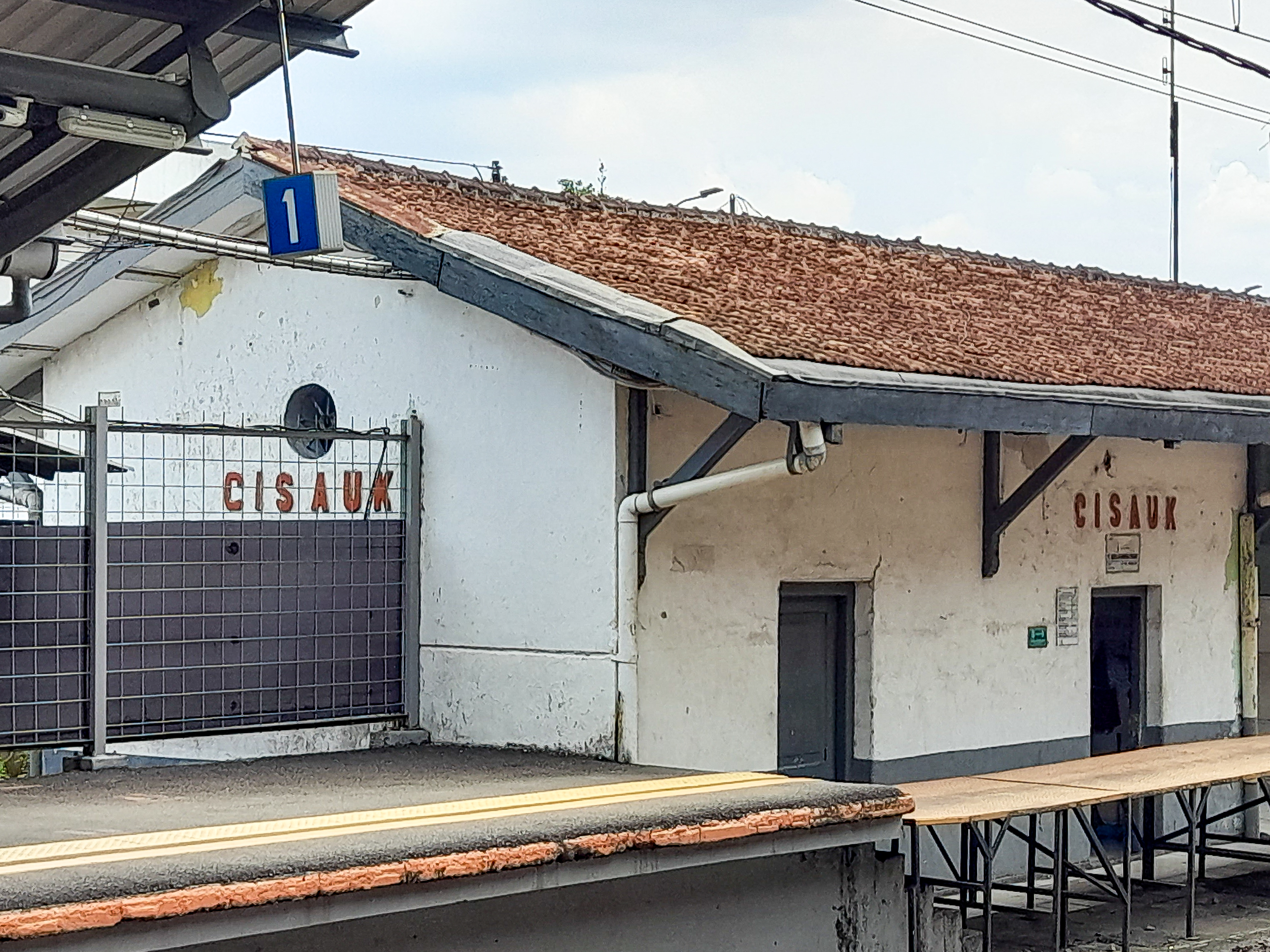
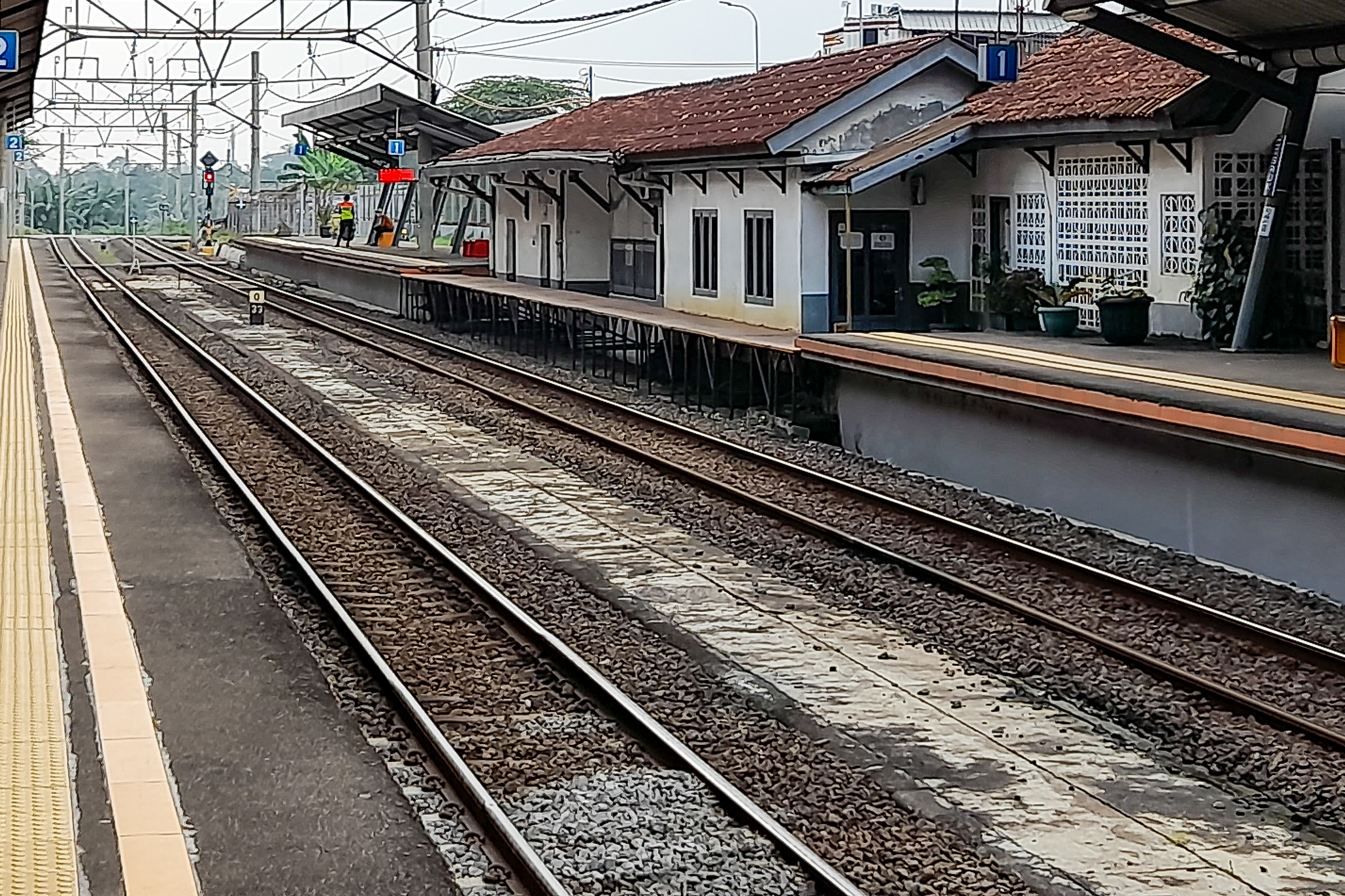
The old building on the station platform. The last image is the remaining of the station's old island platform

Even though Cisauk Station has been renovated, the old station building which is a legacy of the Staatsspoorwegen is still maintained and the train dispatcher room (PPKA) which is also part of the old station building is still in use today. Also, the remains of the old low island platform which is located between lines 1 and 2 can still be seen because they were not dismantled during the station renovation project.

== Station layout ==
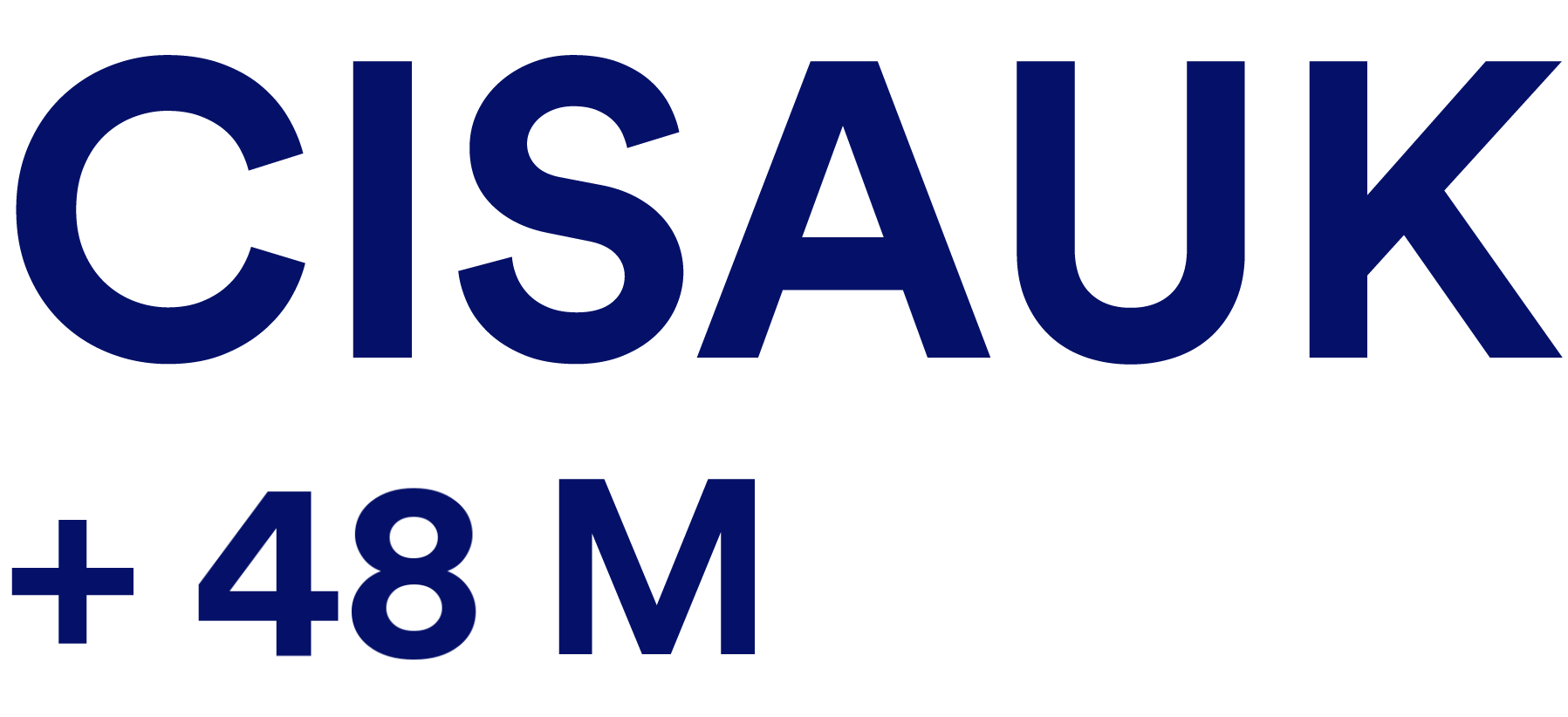
R09
G	Main building	
Platform floor	Side platform, the doors are opened on the right side	
Platform floor	Line 1	← (Cicayur) Rangkasbitung Line to Rangkasbitung
Platform floor	Line 2	Rangkasbitung Line to Tanah Abang (Serpong) →
Platform floor	Side platform, the doors are opened on the right side	
G	Main building	

== Services ==
=== Passenger services ===
==== KRL Commuterline ====
Train line name	Destination	Notes
Rangkasbitung Line	Tanah Abang	
Rangkasbitung Line	Tigaraksa/Rangkasbitung	

== Supporting transportation ==
Type	Route	Destination
JR Connexion	BSD City	BSD Intermoda Terminal–ITC Mangga Dua
JR Connexion	BSD City	BSD Intermoda Terminal–FX Sudirman
BSD Link	3	Avani Club House–BSD Intermoda Terminal–The Icon–Sector 1.3 Terminal
BSD Link	4	BSD Intermoda Terminal–Greenwich Park (via AEON Mall BSD City, counter-clockwise trip)
BSD Link	5	BSD Intermoda Terminal–Greenwich Park (via Foresta, clockwise trip)
BSD Link	6	BSD Intermoda Terminal–Edutown–Vanya Park
Angkot	D20	Serpong Station–Cicangkal
Angkot	KSS	Serpong Station–Gunung Sindur

== Gallery ==
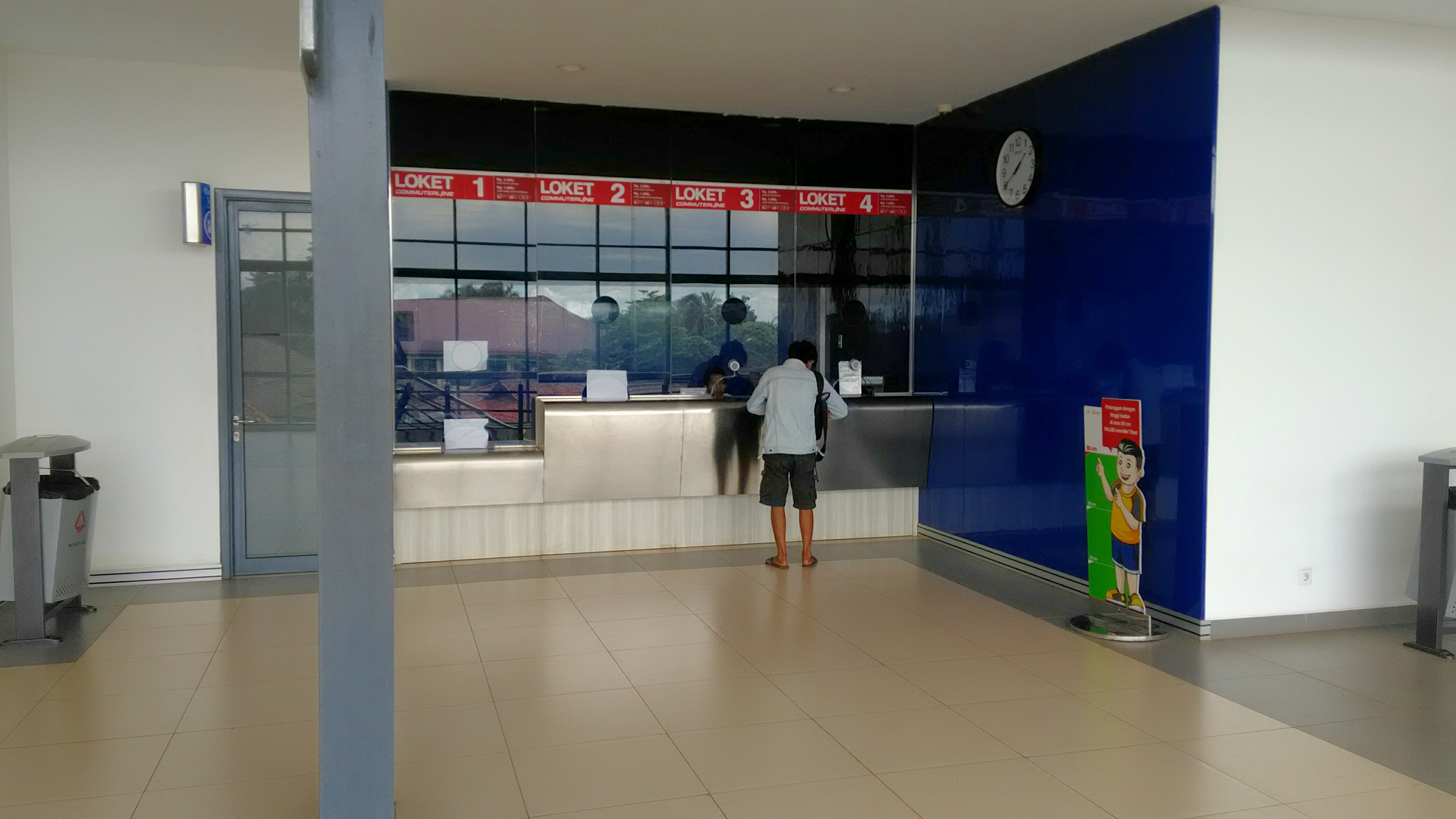
Ticket counter

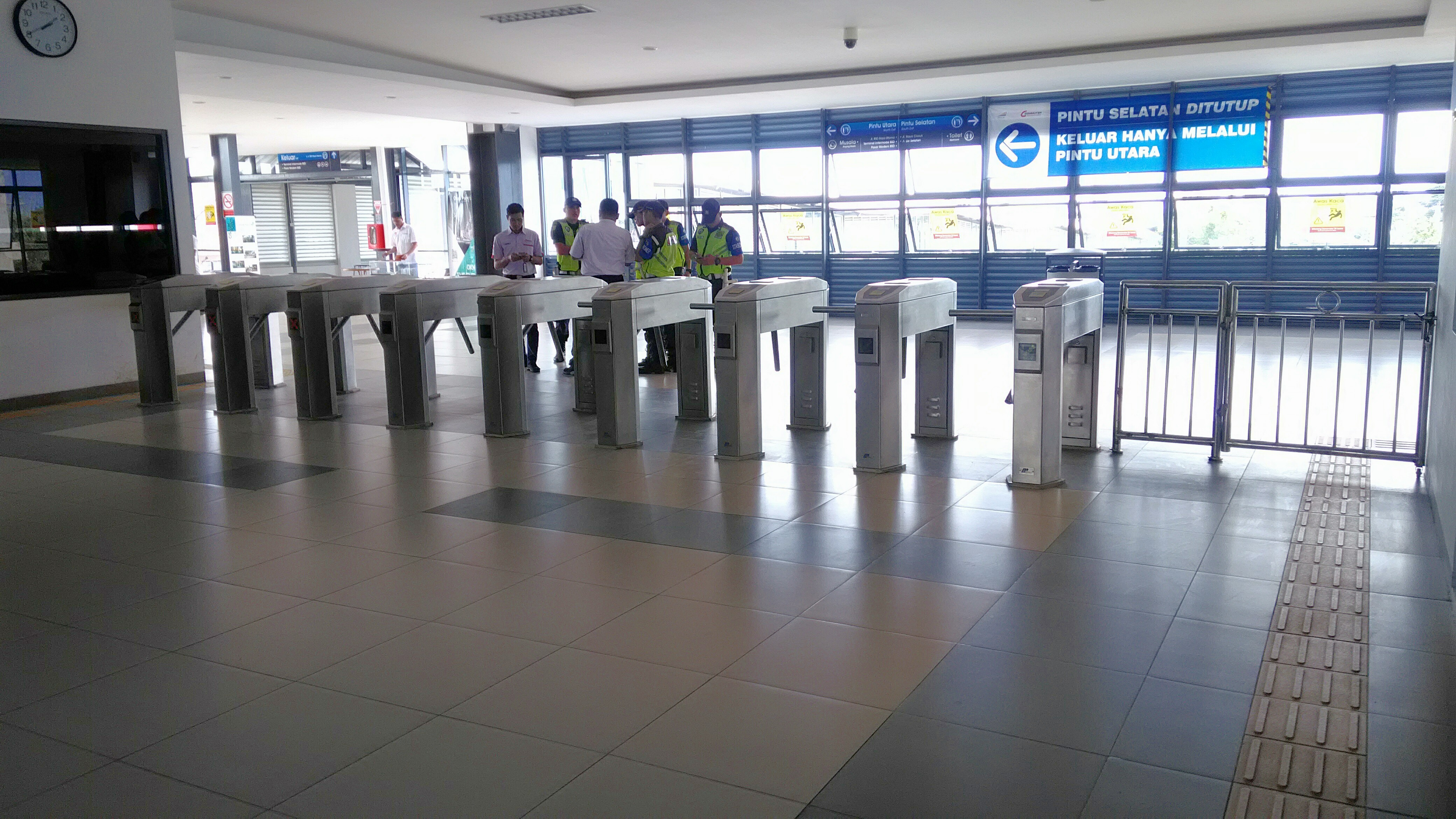
The fare gates of the station

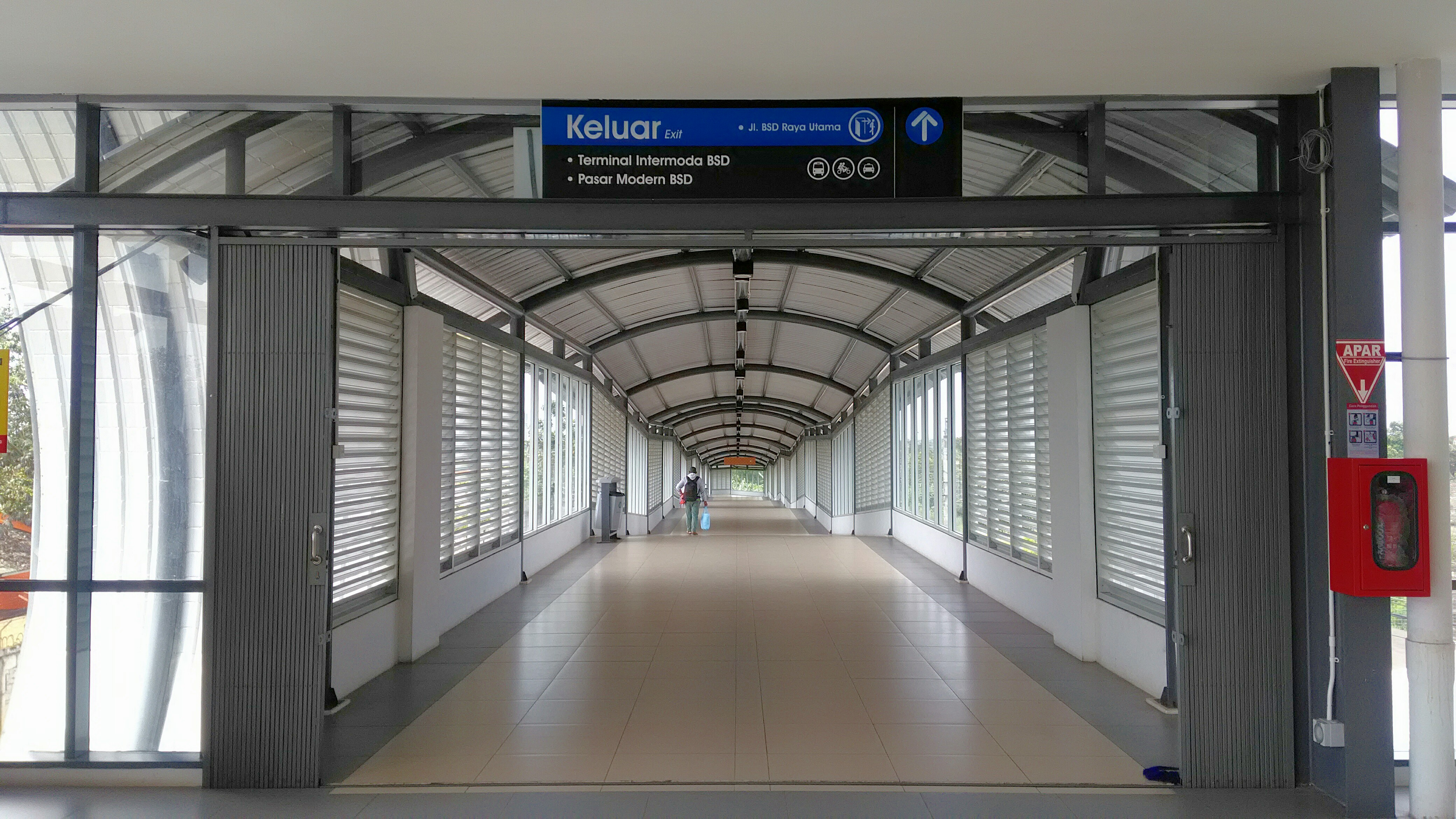
The skybrige to BSD Intermoda Terminal

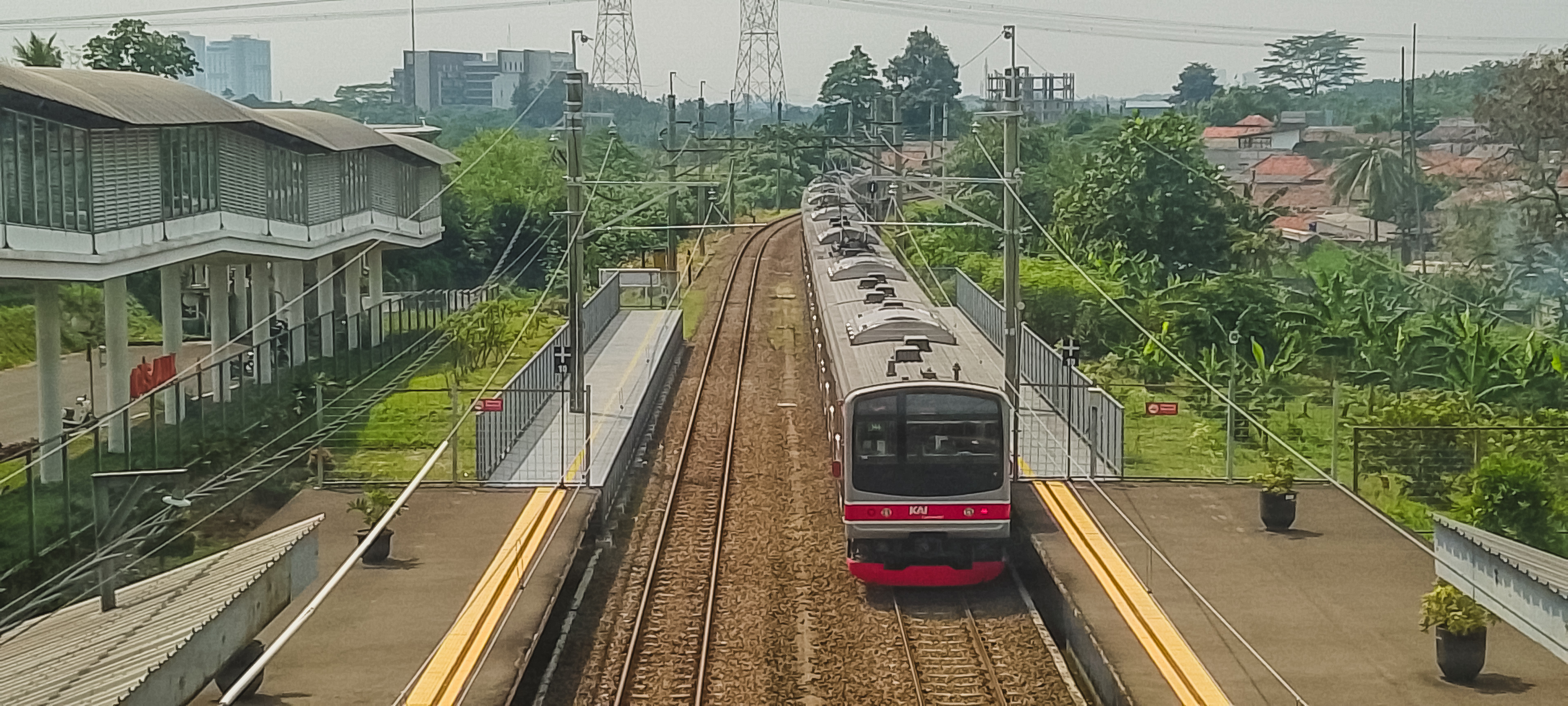
205 series EMU BUD146F (Former KeYo M62F) "Märchen" leaves Cisauk station

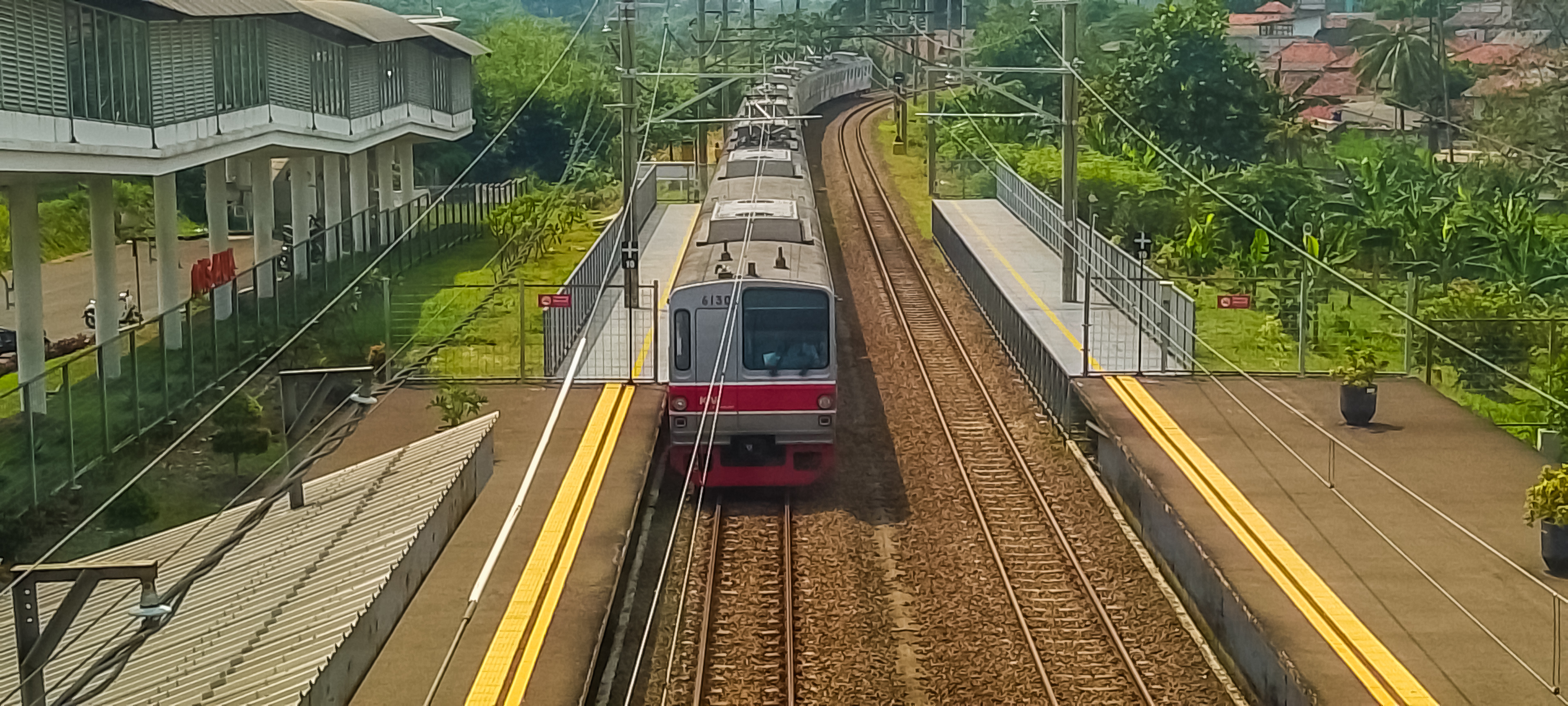
6000 series EMU 6130F enters Cisauk station
