= Pagedangan =

- Village and district
- Interactive map of Pagedangan
- Country: Indonesia
- Province: Banten
- Regency: Tangerang Regency
- Established: 26 May 1999

Area
  - Total: 50.75 km^{2} (19.59 sq mi)

Population (mid 2024 estimate)
  - Total: 119,332
  - Density: 2,351/km^{2} (6,090/sq mi)

Pagedangan is a village and an administrative district (kecamatan) located in the Tangerang Regency of Banten Province on Java, Indonesia. The district covers an area of 50.75 km^{2} and had a population of 95,194 at the 2010 Census and 107,897 at the 2020 Census; the official estimate as of mid-2024 was 119,332 (comprising 60,438 males and 58,894 females).

Pagedangan was previously part of Legok District before it was split off from the eastern part of that district on 26 May 1999.

The district centre is at the village of Pagedangan, and the district is sub-divided into the town (kelurahan) of Medang and ten villages (desa), listed below with their areas and the official estimates of population as of mid-2024, together with their post codes.

Kode Wilayah	Name of Kelurahan or Desa	Area in sq. km	Pop'n mid 2024 estimate	Post code
36.03.22.2012	Karang Tengah	1.52	6,725	15157
36.03.22.2011	Malang Nengah	2.66	9,118	15330
36.03.22.2008	Jatake	4.57	9,204	15330
36.03.22.2010	Kadu Sirung	5.39	9,147	15337
36.03.22.2007	Situ Gadung	7.64	9,845	15338
36.03.22.2003	Pagedangan (village)	5.00	14,925	15339
36.03.22.2002	Cicalengka	2.54	8,357	15336
36.03.22.2006	Lengkong Kulon	6.23	11,057	15331
36.03.22.2005	Cijantra	5.51	8,355	15335
36.03.22.1004	Medang (town)	5.03	24,664	15334
36.03.22.2009	Cihuni	4.65	7,935	15332
36.03.22	Totals	50.75	119,332	

== Transportation ==
Pagedangan has a lot of transportation options due to being developed by housing developers, this district has toll access from the Serpong–Balaraja Toll Road and has KRL Commuterline (Rangkasbitung line) access via Jatake Station.
