= Parung Panjang railway station =

Railway station in Indonesia

R12 Parung Panjang Station Stasiun Parung Panjang
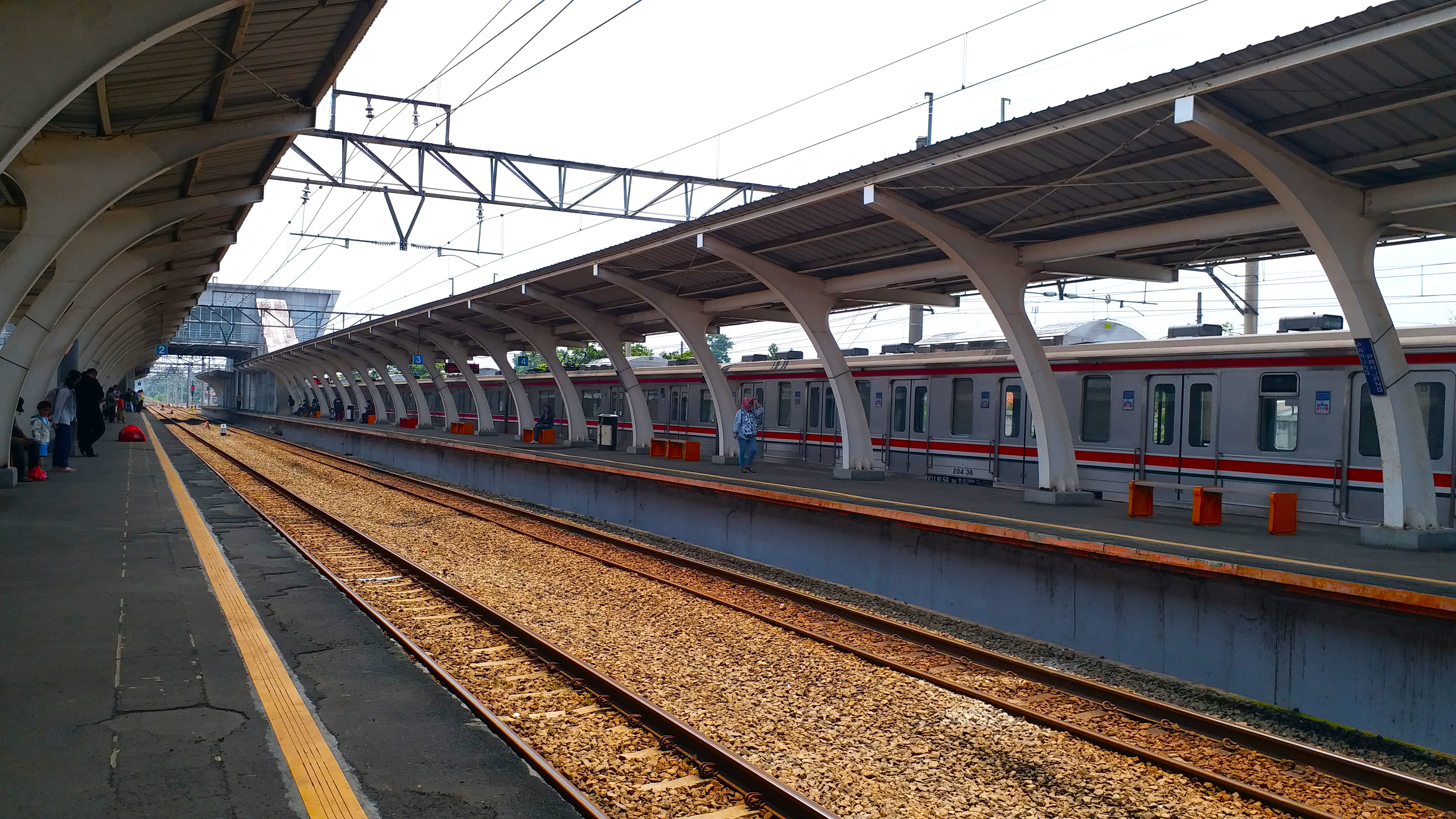
- Parung Panjang Station platform, 2024

General information
- Location: Parung Panjang, Bogor Regency; West Java; Indonesia
- Coordinates: 6.3441538°S 106.5686595°E
- Owner: Kereta Api Indonesia
- Operator: KAI Commuter
- Lines: Rangkasbitung Line; Merak–Tanah Abang
- Platforms: 2 island platforms 1 side platform
- Tracks: 4

Construction
- Parking: Available
- Accessible: Available

Other information
- Station code: PRP • 0207 • PARUNG
- Classification: Large class type B

History
- Opened: 1 October 1899
- Electrified: 2009

Services
Preceding station		Following station
Jatake towards Tanah Abang	Rangkasbitung Commuter Line	Cilejit towards Rangkasbitung
Location
- Location within Bogor Regency

Parung Panjang Station (PRP) is a railway station that is located in Parung Panjang, Bogor Regency, Indonesia. During the colonial era, this station was important due to the location that is midway between Merak Station and Jakarta Kota Station. Before, the station was the last station that has been upgraded to receive an electrified train. But now, the last station changed to Rangkasbitung Station. The station is located in front of Parung Panjang Market. The road in front of the station is a road from Curug, many commuter from Curug uses this station to go to Jakarta.

Before functioning as a station that only served KRL Commuterline trips, this station had also served KRL and local train trips to Rangkasbitung Station and to Merak Station, and had also served express train trips such as the Krakatau Express train. On 1 April 2017, this local train service was finally removed and replaced by KRL Commuterline with the Tanah Abang–Rangkasbitung route, following the Krakatau Express train which was also removed on 17 July 2017. Parung Panjang Station is also a train station that uses new buildings on the Merak–Tanah Abang railway besides Maja, Kebayoran and Palmerah Stations.

== History ==
To make the mobility of passengers from Batavia to Rangkasbitung to the Banten area smoother, in the 1890s, the Staatsspoorwegen company built a railroad line and its stations (including Parung Panjang Station) that connected the Duri Station to the Rangkasbitung area, passing through the Tanah Abang area. This project was completed in 1899, and immediately served by various regular trains serving the route.

In the early 1990s, it was heard that a plan or master plan for the construction of the Jakarta Outer Ring Railway line was made by the Ministry of Transportation of the Republic of Indonesia from and to Parung Panjang Station, with the aim that freight trains would not enter the Special Capital Region of Jakarta area. This route plan connects Parung Panjang Station to Cikarang Station and also to Sungai Lagoa Station. However, due to the 1997 Asian financial crisis, the design of this route was halted in the middle of the project, so that the railway line that has been built only starts from Citayam Station to Nambo Station. In the late 1990s, Parung Panjang Station was using old canopy taken from Angke Station. The use of this canopy did not last long, until it was finally dismantled during the revitalization of the station in 2015.

In order to improve commuter rail services, the railway line between Serpong Station to Parung Panjang Station was also electrified in 2009, followed by Parung Panjang Station to Maja Station on 17 April 2013.

Initially, the station had a total of 4 lines, with line 2 being a straight line. Line 3 which leads to Cicayur is also a straight track after double track line on the Serpong-Parung Panjang segment was operated on 17 April 2013, followed by line 3 which leads to Cilejit also becomes a straight track after a double track on the Parung Panjang–Maja segment operated on 17 December 2015.

A storage warehouse was built in the area near Parung Panjang Station, this warehouse is used as a place to store railway materials that are no longer used, such as train signals. In addition to the warehouses, new lines were also built on the emplacement of Parung Panjang Station which were used for loading and unloading and storage or stabling of the ballast train series, and these new lines were also used for the stabling of the KRL series.

To increase the occupancy of KRL Green Line passengers, in 2014-2016, the Ministry of Transportation of the Republic of Indonesia began to massively renovate Parung Panjang, Maja and Kebayoran Stations into 2 levels with modern and magnificent architecture and complete facilities. On 11 May 2016, the construction of the three stations was completed and inaugurated by the Director General of Railways, Hermanto Dwiatmoko, together with the Regent of Lebak, Iti Octavia Jayabaya, at Maja Station.

== Station layout ==
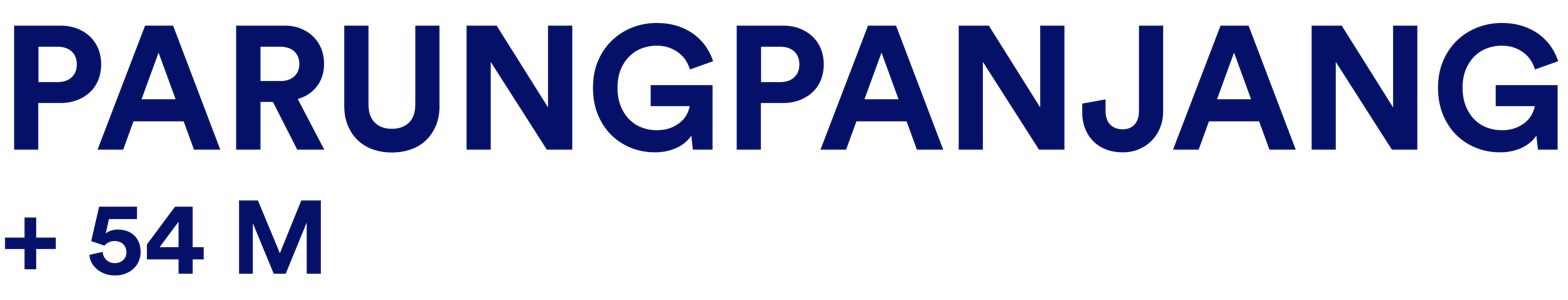
R12
G
Main building
P

Platform floor

Side platform
Line 1
← (Cilejit) Rangkasbitung Line to Rangkasbitung/Tigaraksa
Island platform
Line 2
← (Cilejit) Rangkasbitung Line to Rangkasbitung/Tigaraksa
Line 3
Rangkasbitung Line to Tanah Abang (Jatake) →
Island platform
Line 4
Rangkasbitung Line to Tanah Abang (Jatake) →

== Services ==
The following is a list of train services at the Parung Panjang Station.

- KRL Commuterline
  - Green Line, towards Tanah Abang (Parung Panjang branch)
  - Green Line, towards Tanah Abang and Maja (Maja branch)
  - Green Line, towards Tanah Abang and Rangkasbitung (Rangkasbitung branch)

== Supporting transportation ==
Type	Route	Destination
Angkot	F83 (Bogor Regency)	Parung Panjang–Griya
Angkot	A03 (Tangerang Regency)	Parung Panjang–Bitung
Angkot	KSS (South Tangerang City)	Serpong Station–Gunung Sindur

== Gallery ==
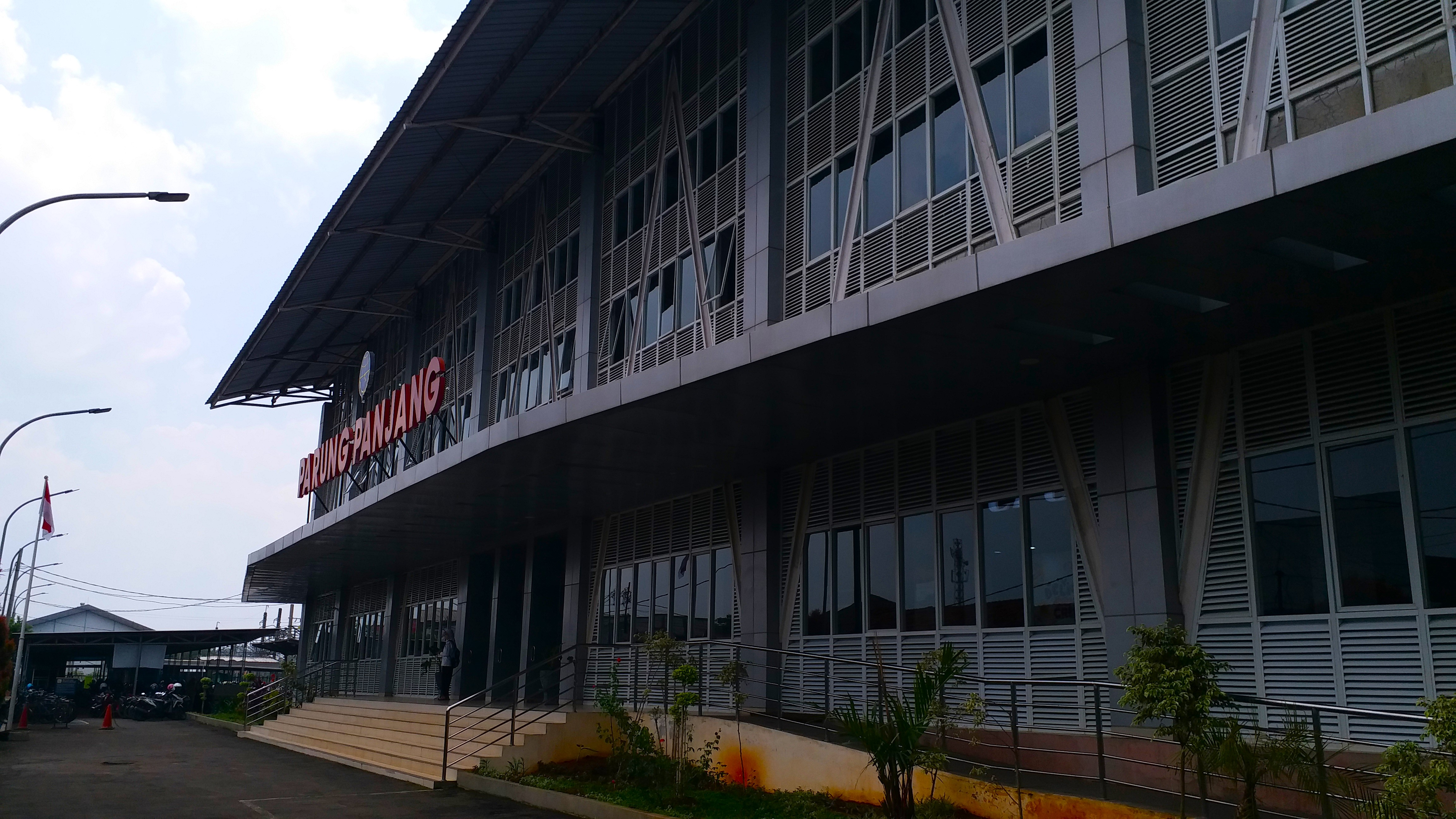
Front facade of the station building, 2024

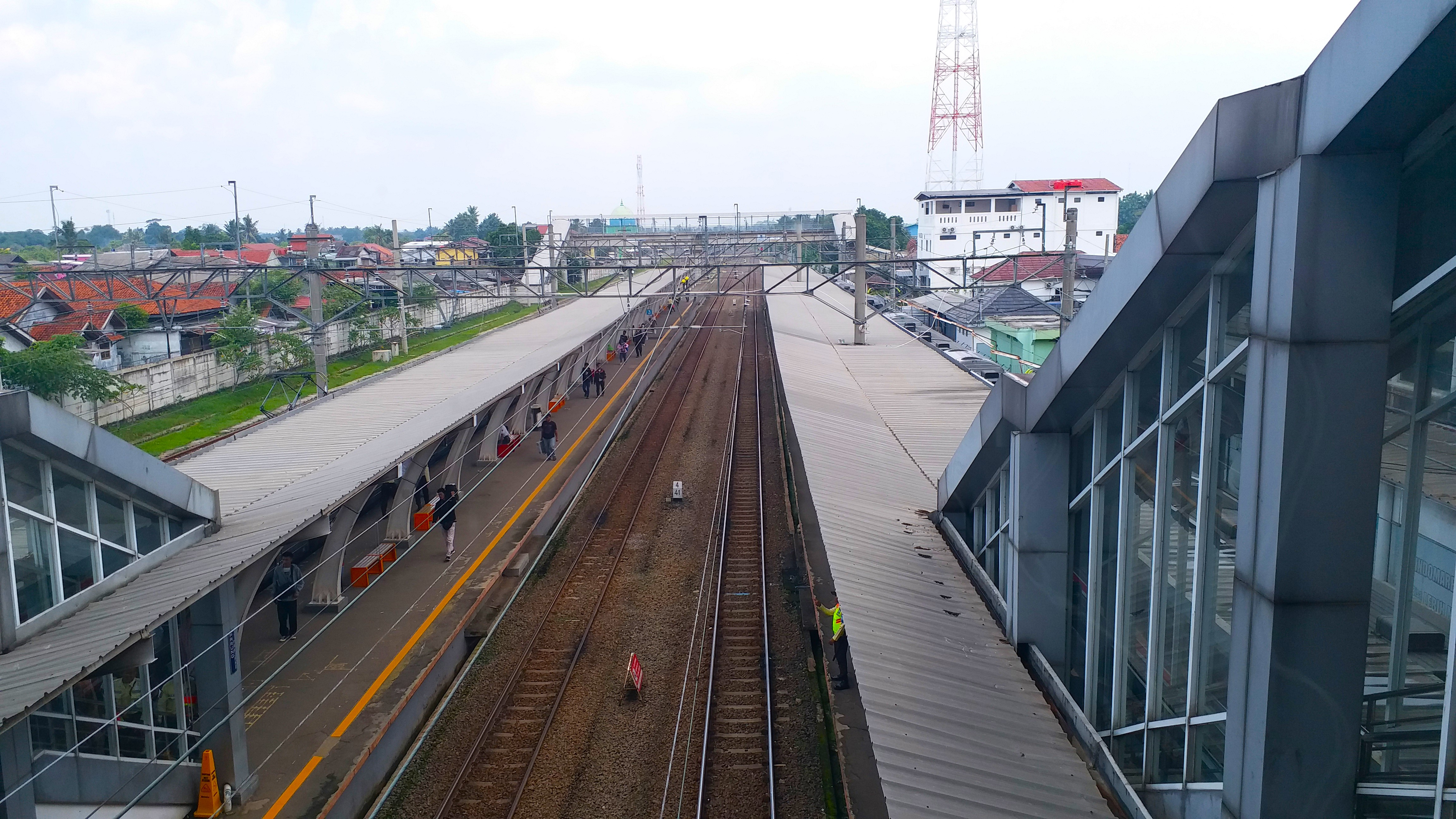
The emplacement of the station

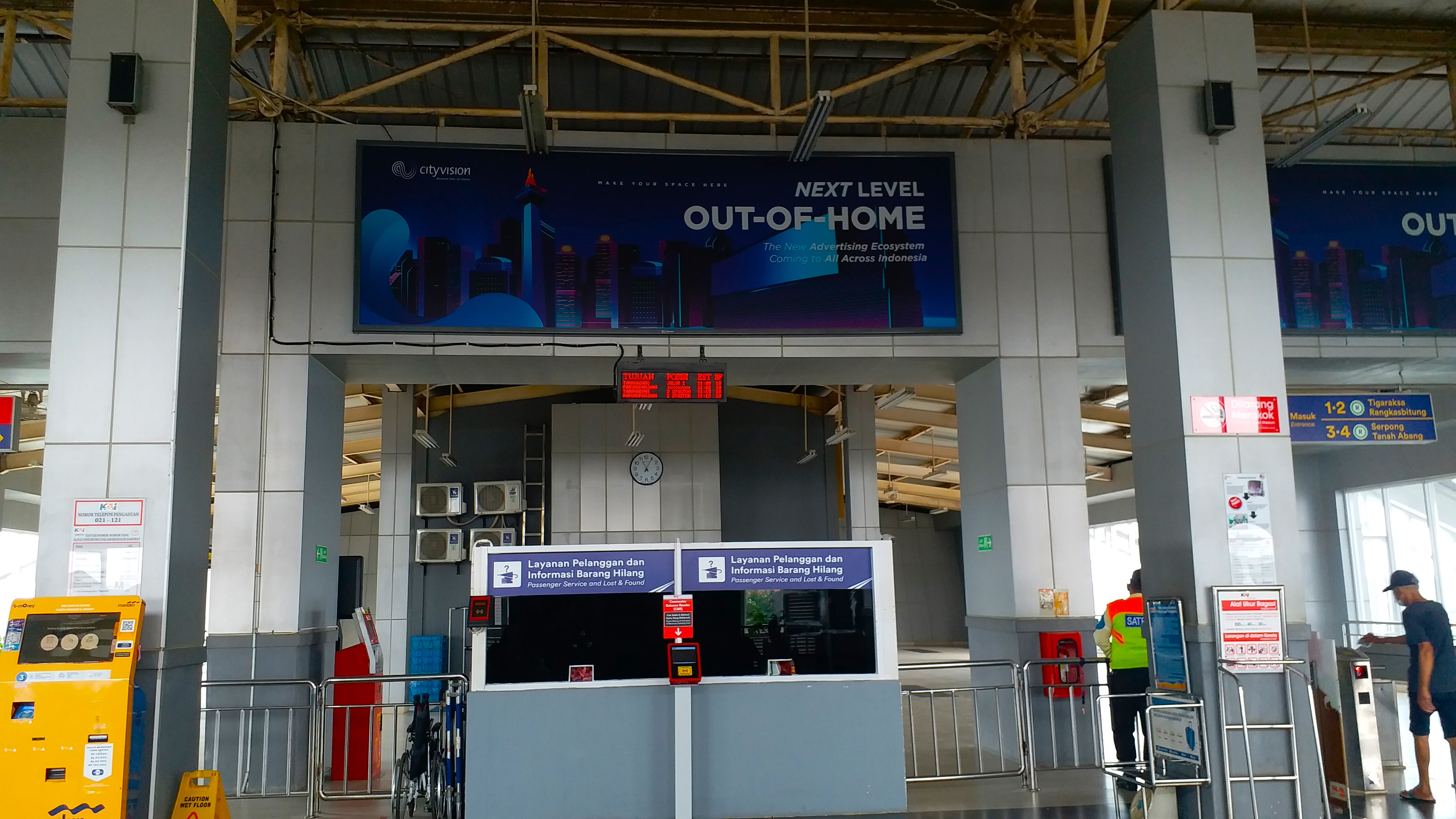
The concourse on the station 2nd floor

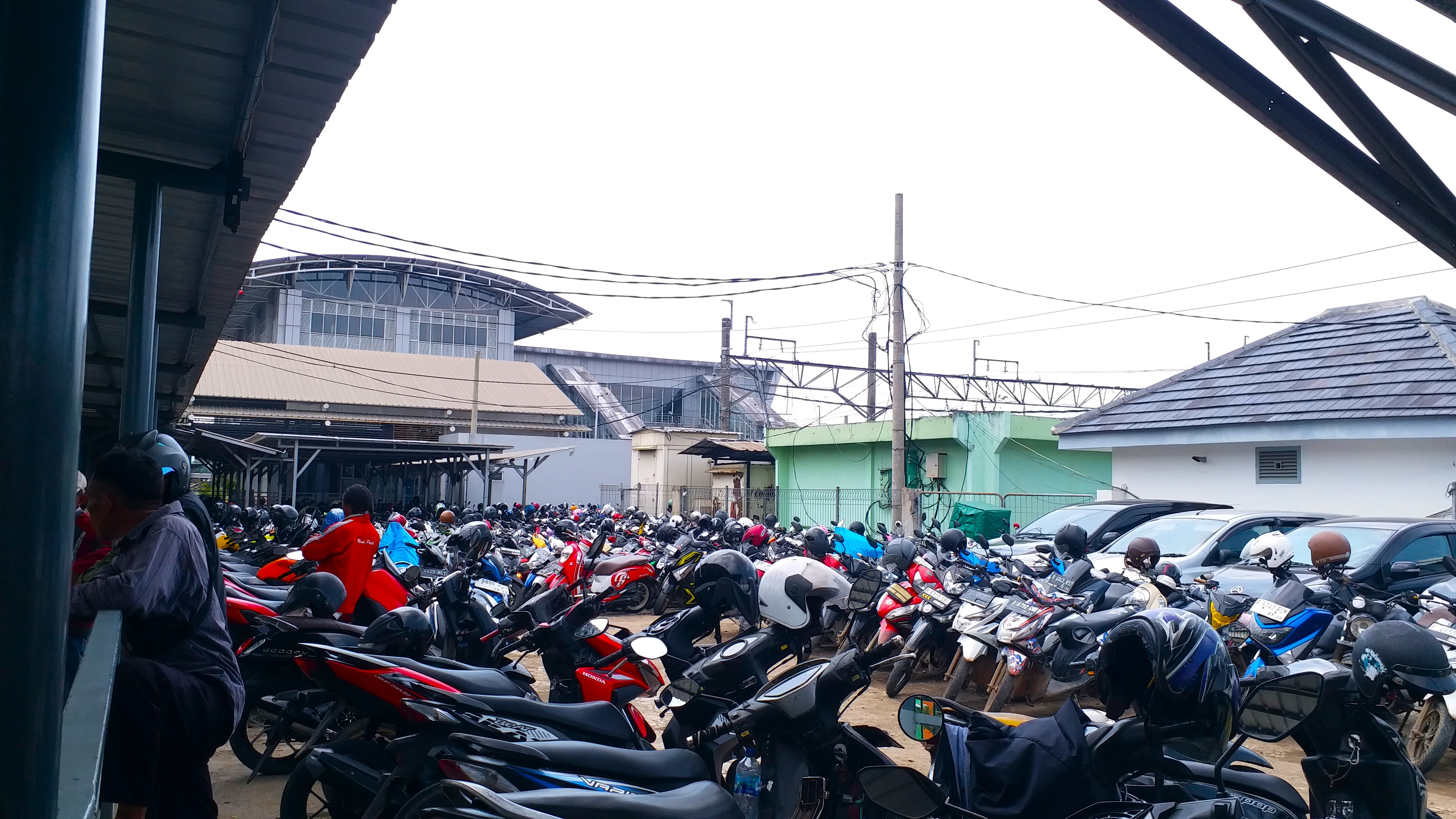
The station parking space

Preceding station	Kereta Api Indonesia	Following station
Cilejit towards Merak	Merak–Tanah Abang	Jatake towards Tanah Abang
