= List of named passenger trains of Southeast Asia =

This article contains lists of named passenger trains in Southeast Asia, listed by country.

== International service ==
Train Name	Railroad	Train Endpoints	Operated
Eastern & Oriental Express	Orient Express	Bangkok – Singapore	

== Indonesia ==
Train Name	Railroad	Train Endpoints	Operated
Anggrek	Kereta Api Indonesia	Jakarta (Gambir) – Surabaya (Surabaya Pasar Turi)	Since 1995 (First operated as Argo Bromo) Since 1997 (Operated as Argo Bromo Anggrek)
Argo Dwipangga	Kereta Api Indonesia	Jakarta (Gambir) – Yogyakarta (Yogyakarta) – Surakarta (Solo Balapan)	Since 1998
Gunung Jati	Kereta Api Indonesia	Jakarta (Gambir) – Cirebon (Cirebon)	Since 2010 (Replacing Argo Jati)
Argo Lawu	Kereta Api Indonesia	Jakarta (Gambir) – Yogyakarta (Yogyakarta) – Surakarta (Solo Balapan)	Since 1996
Argo Muria	Kereta Api Indonesia	Jakarta (Gambir) – Semarang (Semarang Tawang)	Since 1997
Parahyangan	Kereta Api Indonesia	Jakarta (Gambir) – Bandung (Bandung)	Since 2010 (Replacing Argo Gede and Parahyangan)
Argo Sindoro	Kereta Api Indonesia	Jakarta (Gambir) – Semarang (Semarang Tawang)	Since 2001 (Replacing Argo Muria I)
Argo Wilis	Kereta Api Indonesia	Bandung (Bandung) – Surabaya (Surabaya Gubeng)	Since 1998
Bangunkarta	Kereta Api Indonesia	Jakarta (Pasar Senen) – Jombang (Jombang) – Surabaya (Surabaya Gubeng)	Since 1985 (First operated) Since 2013 (Route extended to Surabaya Gubeng)
Banten Express/Patas Merak	Kereta Api Indonesia	Jakarta (Angke) – Merak (Merak)	
Bengawan	Kereta Api Indonesia	Jakarta (Pasar Senen) – Surakarta (Purwosari)	
Bima	Kereta Api Indonesia	Jakarta (Gambir) – Surabaya (Surabaya Gubeng) – Malang (Malang)	Since 1967 (First operated) Since 2014 (Route extended to Malang)
Bogowonto	Kereta Api Indonesia	Jakarta (Pasar Senen) – Yogyakarta (Lempuyangan)	Since 2010
Brantas	Kereta Api Indonesia	Jakarta (Pasar Senen) – Kediri (Kediri)	Since 1980
Cirebon Express	Kereta Api Indonesia	Jakarta (Gambir) – Cirebon (Cirebon)	Since 1989
Ciremai Ekspres	Kereta Api Indonesia	Bandung (Bandung) – Cirebon (Cirebon)	Since 2013
Fajar Utama Yogyakarta	Kereta Api Indonesia	Jakarta (Pasar Senen) – Yogyakarta (Yogyakarta)	Since 1986
Gajayana	Kereta Api Indonesia	Jakarta (Gambir) – Malang (Malang)	Since 1999
Gajah Wong	Kereta Api Indonesia	Jakarta (Pasar Senen) – Yogyakarta (Lempuyangan)	Since 2011
Gaya Baru Malam Selatan	Kereta Api Indonesia	Jakarta (Pasar Senen) – Surabaya (Surabaya Gubeng)	
Gumarang	Kereta Api Indonesia	Jakarta (Pasar Senen) – Surabaya (Surabaya Pasar Turi)	Since 2001
Harina	Kereta Api Indonesia	Bandung (Bandung) – Semarang (Semarang Tawang) – Surabaya (Surabaya Pasar Turi)	Since 2003 (First operated) Since 2013 (Route extended to Surabaya)
Jaka Tingkir	Kereta Api Indonesia	Jakarta (Pasar Senen) – Surakarta (Purwosari)	Since 2013
Jayabaya	Kereta Api Indonesia	Jakarta (Pasar Senen) – Surabaya (Surabaya Pasar Turi) – Malang (Malang)	Since 2014 (Revival from business class Jayabaya Utara)
Joglokerto Ekspres	Kereta Api Indonesia	Surakarta (Solo Balapan) – Yogyakarta (Yogyakarta) – Purwokerto (Purwokerto)	Since 2014 (First operated as Joglo Ekspres) Since 2015 (Route extended to Purwokerto and name changed to Joglokerto Ekspres)
Kahuripan	Kereta Api Indonesia	Bandung (Kiaracondong) – Kediri (Kediri)	Since 1995
Kaligung	Kereta Api Indonesia	Tegal (Tegal) – Semarang (Semarang Poncol)	Since 2010
Kalijaga	Kereta Api Indonesia	Surakarta (Solo Balapan) – Semarang (Semarang Poncol)	Since 2014
Kalimaya	Kereta Api Indonesia	Jakarta (Tanah Abang) – Merak (Merak)	Since 2012
Kamandaka	Kereta Api Indonesia	Purwokerto (Purwokerto) – Semarang (Semarang Tawang)	Since 2014
Krakatau Ekspres	Kereta Api Indonesia	Merak (Merak) – Jakarta (Pasar Senen) – Kediri (Kediri)	Since 2013
Kertajaya	Kereta Api Indonesia	Jakarta (Pasar Senen) – Surabaya (Surabaya Pasar Turi)	
Kutojaya Selatan	Kereta Api Indonesia	Bandung (Kiaracondong) – Purworejo (Kutoarjo)	Since 1997
Kutojaya Utara	Kereta Api Indonesia	Jakarta (Pasar Senen) – Purworejo (Kutoarjo)	Since 1977
Lodaya	Kereta Api Indonesia	Bandung (Bandung) – Yogyakarta (Yogyakarta) – Surakarta (Solo Balapan)	Since 1992
Logawa	Kereta Api Indonesia	Purwokerto (Purwokerto) – Jember (Jember)	
Madiun Jaya/Mantab	Kereta Api Indonesia	Jakarta (Pasar Senen) – Madiun (Madiun)	Operating only on public holiday
Maharani	Kereta Api Indonesia	Semarang (Semarang Poncol) – Surabaya (Surabaya Pasar Turi)	Since 2014
Majapahit	Kereta Api Indonesia	Jakarta (Pasar Senen) – Malang (Malang)	Since 2009 (First operated as Senja Kediri) Since 2012 (Name changed to Majapahit)
Malabar	Kereta Api Indonesia	Bandung (Bandung) – Malang (Malang)	Since 2010
Malioboro Ekspres	Kereta Api Indonesia	Yogyakarta (Yogyakarta) – Malang (Malang)	Since 2012
Matarmaja	Kereta Api Indonesia	Jakarta (Pasar Senen) – Malang (Malang)	
Menoreh	Kereta Api Indonesia	Jakarta (Jakarta Kota) – Semarang (Semarang Tawang)	Since 2012 (First operation) Since 2019(Station changed from Pasar Senen to Jakarta Kota)
Mutiara Selatan	Kereta Api Indonesia	Bandung (Bandung) – Surabaya (Surabaya Gubeng)	
Mutiara Timur	Kereta Api Indonesia	Surabaya (Surabaya Gubeng) – Banyuwangi (Ketapang)	
Pangrango	Kereta Api Indonesia	Bogor (Bogor Paledang) – Sukabumi (Sukabumi)	
Pasundan	Kereta Api Indonesia	Bandung (Kiaracondong) – Surabaya (Surabaya Gubeng)	
Jatiluhur Ekspress	Kereta Api Indonesia	Jakarta (Tanjung Priuk) – Cikampek (Cikampek)	Since 1966
Walahar Ekspres	Kereta Api Indonesia	Jakarta (Tanjung Priuk) – Purwakarta (Purwakarta)	Since 1971
Penataran	Kereta Api Indonesia	Surabaya (Surabaya Kota) – Malang (Malang) – Blitar (Blitar)	
Probowangi	Kereta Api Indonesia	Surabaya (Surabaya Kota) – Banyuwangi (Ketapang)	
Progo	Kereta Api Indonesia	Jakarta (Pasar Senen) – Yogyakarta (Lempuyangan)	
Purwojaya	Kereta Api Indonesia	Jakarta (Gambir) – Cilacap (Cilacap)	
Rangkas Jaya	Kereta Api Indonesia	Jakarta (Pasar Senen) – Rangkasbitung (Rangkasbitung)	
Sancaka	Kereta Api Indonesia	Yogyakarta (Yogyakarta) – Surabaya (Surabaya Gubeng)	
Sawunggalih Utama	Kereta Api Indonesia	Jakarta (Pasar Senen) – Purworejo (Kutoarjo)	
Sembrani	Kereta Api Indonesia	Jakarta (Gambir) – Surabaya (Surabaya Pasar Turi)	
Senja Utama Solo	Kereta Api Indonesia	Jakarta (Pasar Senen) – Surakarta (Solo Balapan)	
Senja Utama Yogyakarta	Kereta Api Indonesia	Jakarta (Pasar Senen) – Yogyakarta (Yogyakarta)	
Serayu	Kereta Api Indonesia	Jakarta (Pasar Senen) – Bandung (Kiaracondong) – Purwokerto (Purwokerto)	
Senja Utama Solo	Kereta Api Indonesia	Jakarta (Pasar Senen) – Surakarta (Solo Balapan)	
Siantar Ekspres	Kereta Api Indonesia	Medan (Medan) – Pematangsiantar (Siantar)	
Siliwangi	Kereta Api Indonesia	Sukabumi (Sukabumi) – Cianjur (Cianjur)	
Simandra/Lokal Cibatu	Kereta Api Indonesia	Garut (Cibatu) – Purwakarta (Purwakarta)	
Sri Tanjung	Kereta Api Indonesia	Yogyakarta (Lempuyangan) – Banyuwangi (Ketapang)	
Taksaka	Kereta Api Indonesia	Jakarta (Gambir) – Yogyakarta (Yogyakarta)	
Tawang Alun	Kereta Api Indonesia	Malang (Malang) – Banyuwangi (Ketapang)	
Tawang Jaya	Kereta Api Indonesia	Jakarta (Pasar Senen) – Semarang (Semarang Poncol)	
Tegal Arum	Kereta Api Indonesia	Jakarta (Pasar Senen) – Tegal (Tegal)	
Tegal Bahari	Kereta Api Indonesia	Jakarta (Gambir) – Tegal (Tegal)	
Tegal Ekspres	Kereta Api Indonesia	Jakarta (Pasar Senen) – Tegal (Tegal)	
Turangga	Kereta Api Indonesia	Bandung (Bandung) – Surabaya (Surabaya Kota)	
Serelo	Kereta Api Indonesia	Palembang (Kertapati) – Lubuklinggau (Lubuklinggau)	
Sindang Marga	Kereta Api Indonesia	Palembang (Kertapati) – Lubuklinggau (Lubuklinggau)	
Sriwijaya	Kereta Api Indonesia	Palembang (Kertapati) – Bandar Lampung (Tanjung Karang)	
Rajabasa	Kereta Api Indonesia	Palembang (Kertapati) – Bandar Lampung (Tanjung Karang)	
Putri Deli	Kereta Api Indonesia	Medan (Medan) – Tanjungbalai (Tanjungbalai)	
Siantar Express	Kereta Api Indonesia	Medan (Medan) – Pematangsiantar (Siantar)	
Sribilah	Kereta Api Indonesia	Medan (Medan) – Labuhan Batu (Rantau Prapat)	
Sibinuang	Kereta Api Indonesia	Padang (Padang) – Pariaman (Naras)	

== Malaysia ==
Train Name	Railroad	Train Endpoints	Operated
Ekspres Rakyat (ER1/ER2)	Keretapi Tanah Melayu	Singapore – Butterworth	
Ekspres Sinaran Utara (SU10/SU11)	Keretapi Tanah Melayu	Kuala Lumpur Sentral – Butterworth	
Ekspres Sinaran Selatan (SS13)	Keretapi Tanah Melayu	Kuala Lumpur Sentral – Singapore	
Ekspres Sinaran Selatan (SS12)	Keretapi Tanah Melayu	Singapore – Kuala Lumpur Sentral	
Ekspres Senandung Langkawi(SL20/SL21)	Keretapi Tanah Melayu (B'Worth - Padang Besar)	Kuala Lumpur Sentral – Hat Yai, Thailand	
Ekspres Senandung Sutera (SS25)	Keretapi Tanah Melayu	Kuala Lumpur Sentral – Singapore	
Ekspres Senandung Timuran(ST26/ST27)	Keretapi Tanah Melayu	Singapore – Tumpat	
Ekspres Senandung Sutera (SS24)	Keretapi Tanah Melayu	Singapore – Kuala Lumpur Sentral	
Ekspres Senandung Wau (SW28/SW29)	Keretapi Tanah Melayu	Kuala Lumpur Sentral – Tumpat	
Ekspres Antarabangsa (IE35/IE36)	Keretapi Tanah Melayu (B'Worth - Padang Besar)	Butterworth – Bangkok, Thailand	
Ekspres Sinaran Timur (14/15)	Keretapi Tanah Melayu	Singapore – Tumpat	
Shuttle 61/64	Keretapi Tanah Melayu	Singapore – Gemas	

== Thailand ==
Train Name	Railroad	Train Endpoints	Operated
Nakhonphink Express	State Railway of Thailand	Bangkok – Chiang Mai	
International Express	State Railway of Thailand (Bangkok - Padang Besar)	Bangkok – Butterworth, Malaysia	
Thaksin Express	State Railway of Thailand	Bangkok – Sungai Golok	
Langkawi Express	State Railway of Thailand (Hat Yai - Padang Besar)	Hat Yai – Kuala Lumpur Sentral, Malaysia	
Eastern & Oriental Express	Orient Express	Bangkok – Chiang Mai	
Eastern & Oriental Express	Orient Express	Bangkok – Nong Khai, (Vientiene)	2007
