= Lahat =

Lahat may refer to:

== Places ==
- Lahat Regency, regency in South Sumatra province, Indonesia
  - Lahat, Sumatra, an administrative district a town, capital of the regency
    - Lahat railway station (Indonesia), station in the town
- Lahat, Malaysia, a town in Parak, Malaysia
  - Lahat railway station (Malaysia), station in the town

== Technology ==
- LAHAT, an anti-tank guided missile manufactured by Israel Aerospace Industries

== People ==
- Noad Lahat (born 1948), Israeli featherweight mixed martial artist
- Shlomo Lahat (1927–2014), Israeli politician
