= Prabumulih Baru X5 railway station =

Railway station in Indonesia

Prabumulih Baru X5 Station Stasiun Prabumulih Baru X5

General information
- Location: Tanjung Raman, South Prabumulih, Prabumulih, South Sumatra, Indonesia
- Coordinates: 3.463772°S 104.235525°E
- Elevation: +43m
- Owner: Kereta Api Indonesia
- Manager: Kereta Api Indonesia
- Line: Prabumulih–Panjang
- Tracks: 3

Other information
- Station code: PBR X5 • X5
- Classification: Class II
Location
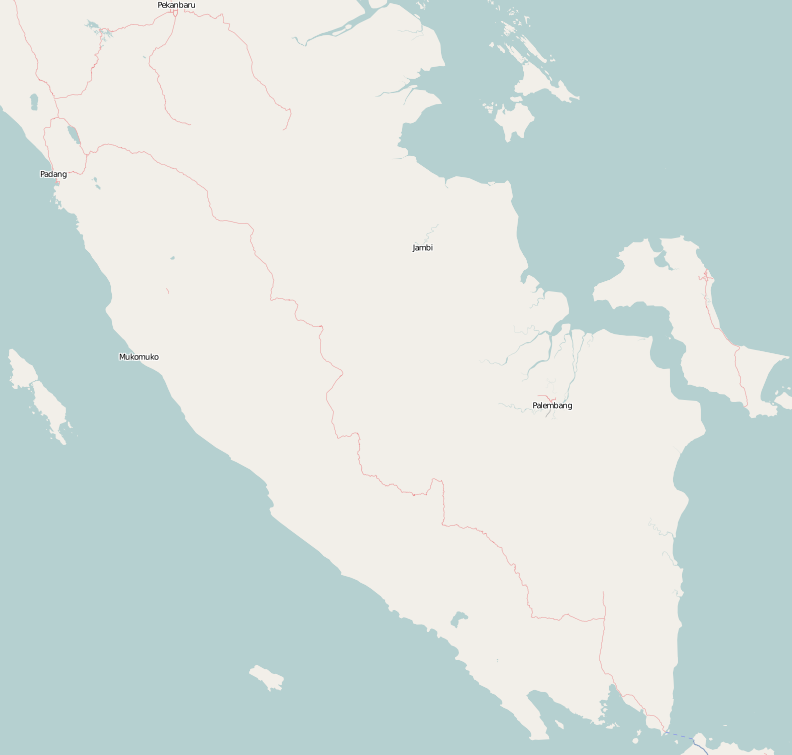
- Location within Southern Sumatra

Prabumulih Baru X5 Station (PBR X5) is a class II railway station located in South Prabumulih District, Prabumulih, South Sumatra, Indonesia. The station served as a block post, and it is located at a railway junction where the line from Tanjung Karang splits in two, with one going to Kertapati and the other to Lubuklinggau. The signaling system and rail switches of this station are operated from X6 block post.

With the opening of X6–Tanjung Rambang double tracks, the station has three tracks.

Preceding station	Kereta Api Indonesia	Following station
Prabumulih	Prabumulih–Panjang	Tanjung Rambang towards Panjang
Terminus	X5–X6	Prabumulih Baru X6
