= Prabumulih Baru X6 railway station =

Railway station in Indonesia

Prabumulih Baru X6 Station Stasiun Prabumulih Baru X6
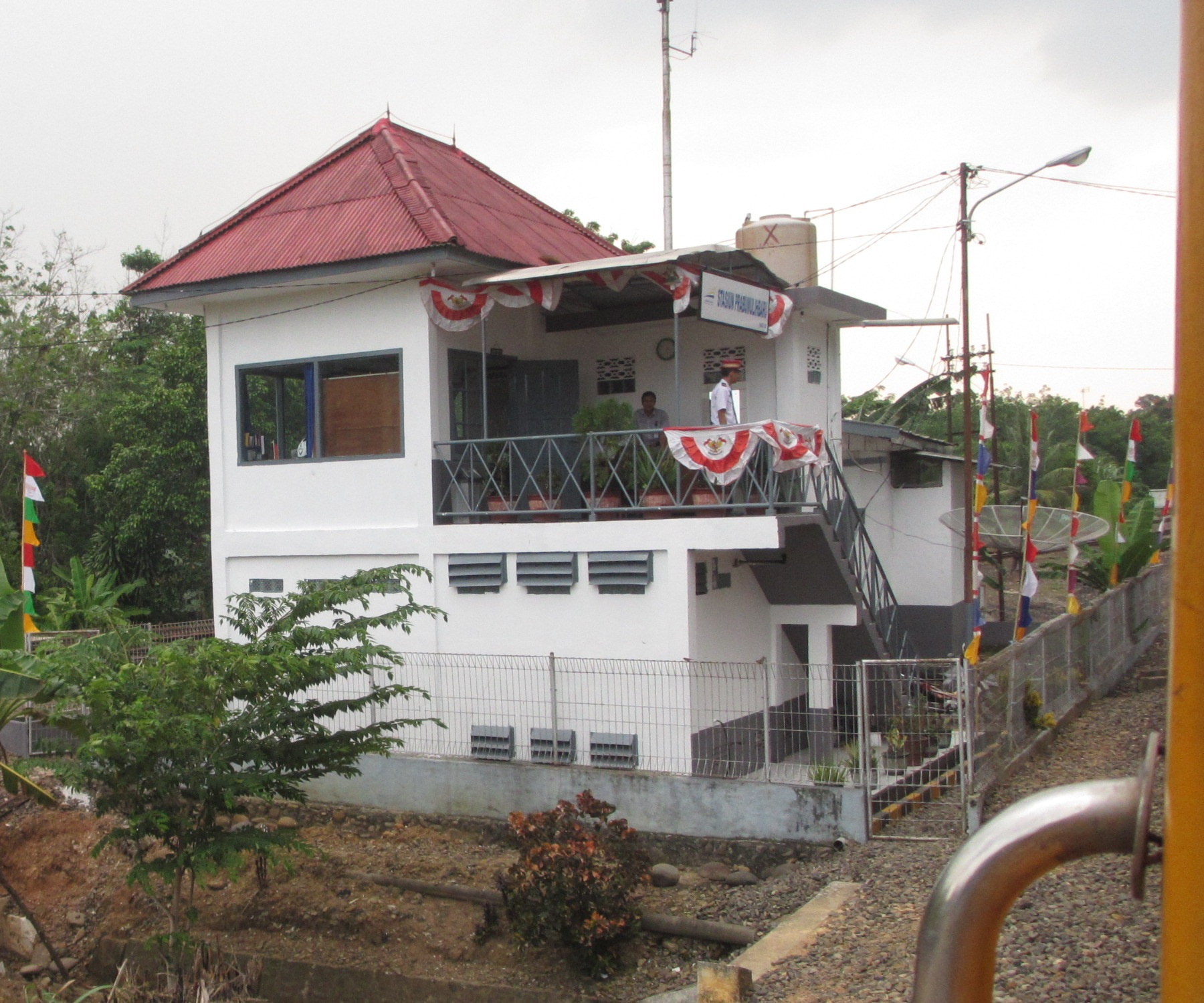
- Prabumulih Baru X6 Station in 2015

General information
- Location: Prabumulih, West Prabumulih, Prabumulih, South Sumatra, Indonesia
- Coordinates: 3.442265°S 104.224145°E
- Elevation: +43m
- Owner: Kereta Api Indonesia
- Manager: Kereta Api Indonesia
- Line: Lubuklinggau–Prabumulih
- Tracks: 4

Other information
- Station code: PBR X6 • X6
- Classification: Class II
Location
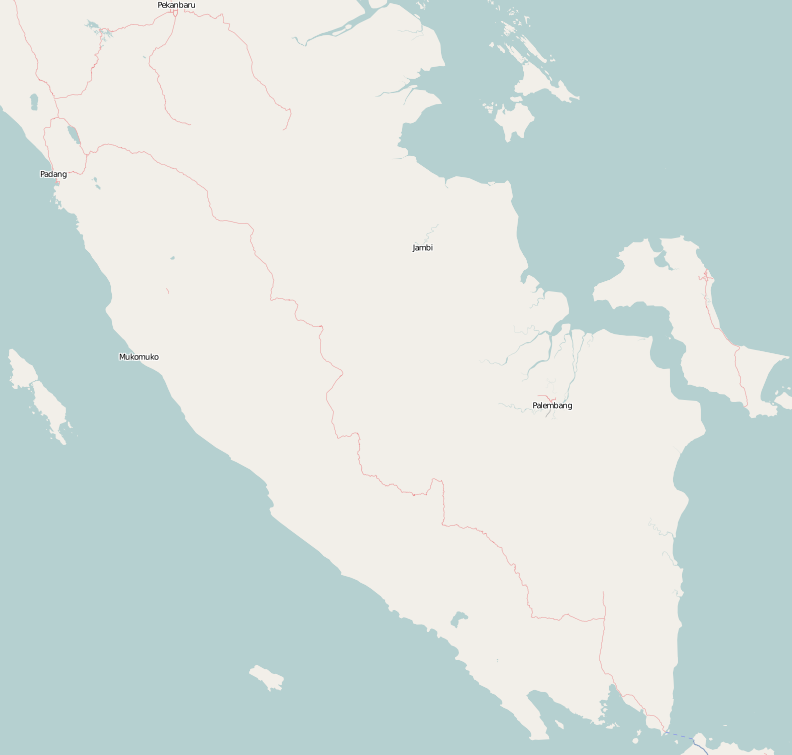
- Location within Southern Sumatra

Prabumulih Baru X6 Station (PBR X6) is a class II railway station located in West Prabumulih District, Prabumulih, South Sumatra, Indonesia. The station served as a block post, and it is located at a railway junction where the line from Lubuklinggau splits in two, with one going to Kertapati and the other to Tanjung Karang. The signaling system and rail switches of both X6 and X5 block posts are operated from this station.

With the opening of X6–Tanjung Rambang and X6–Prabumulih double tracks, the station has four tracks.

Preceding station	Kereta Api Indonesia	Following station
Penimur towards Lubuklinggau	Lubuklinggau–Prabumulih	Prabumulih
Prabumulih Baru X5	X5–X6	Terminus
