= Kotabumi railway station =

Railway station in Indonesia

Kotabumi Station Stasiun Kotabumi
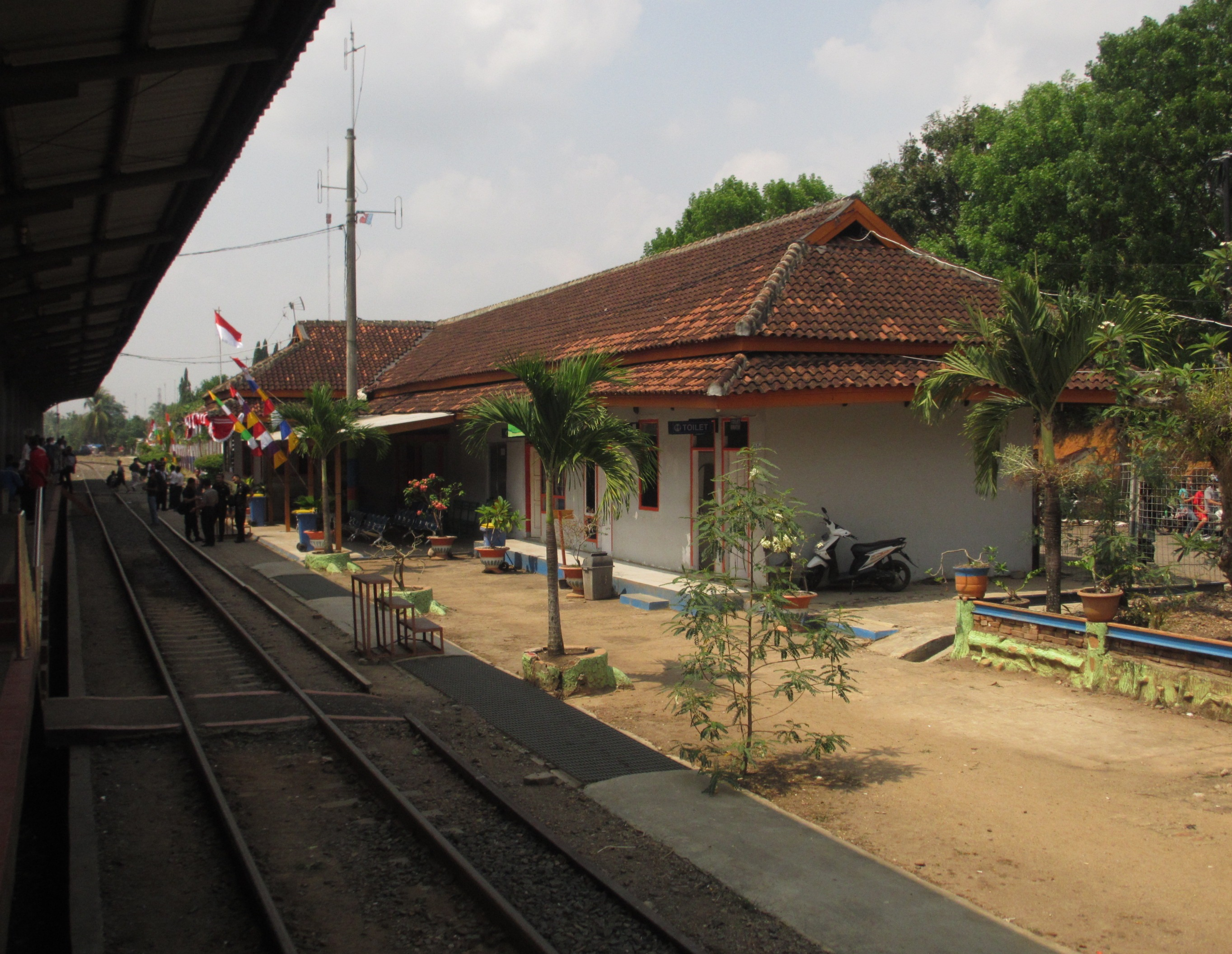
- Kotabumi Station in 2015

General information
- Location: Cempedak, South Kotabumi, North Lampung Regency, Lampung, Indonesia
- Coordinates: 4.821919°S 104.881221°E
- Elevation: +28m
- Owner: Kereta Api Indonesia
- Manager: Kereta Api Indonesia
- Line: Prabumulih–Tanjung Karang–Panjang
- Platforms: one side platform and two island platform
- Tracks: 3

Construction
- Structure type: Ground
- Parking: Available

Other information
- Station code: KB • 6720 • KOTA
- Classification: Class I

History
- Opened: 2 January 1921
- Original company: Zuid-Sumatra Staatsspoorwegen
Location
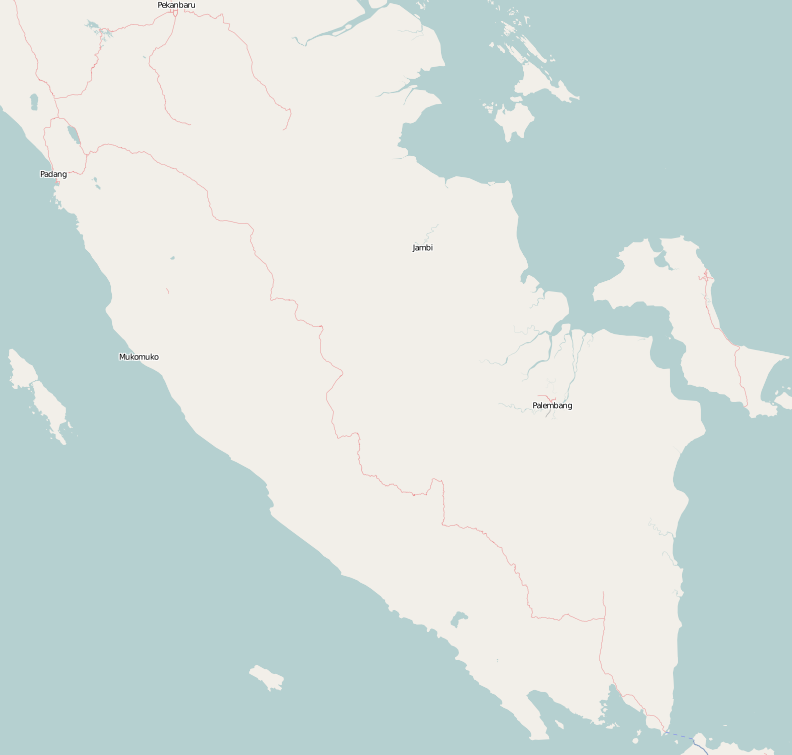
- Location within Southern Sumatra

Kotabumi Station (KB) is a class I railway station located in South Kotabumi District, North Lampung Regency, Lampung, Indonesia. The station is located at an altitude of +28 meters and is operated by the Regional Division IV Tanjungkarang of Kereta Api Indonesia.

== History ==
Kotabumi Station was inaugurated on 2 January 1921, along with the inauguration of the Blambangan Pagar–Kotabumi railway segment, as part of the construction of the Kertapati–Panjang railway line.

== Building and layout ==
The station has three lines and three platforms, with the Line 2 being the straight line. The station used to have fourth line, but it was dismantled. There's a small disused locomotive shed to the northwest of the station. The station's facility includes waiting room, lactation room, clinic, ticket counter, toilet, musalla and parking space.

All passenger trains serving the Kertapati–Tanjung Karang route stopped at this station to pick up and drop off passengers. With the completion of Cempaka–Kotabumi double track project on 9 December 2020, all freight trains are required to stop at the station for 2-5 minutes with the enactment of the 2021 southern Sumatra train schedule. It was done for safety purpose as the track is transitioning from single track to double track at Kotabumi station.

== Services ==
The following is a list of train services at the Kotabumi Station

=== Passenger services ===
- Economy class
  - Kuala Stabas to Baturaja and Tanjung Karang
  - Rajabasa to Kertapati and Tanjung Karang
- Mixed class
  - Sriwijaya to Kertapati and Tanjung Karang

=== Freight ===
- Coal to Tarahan and Tanjung Enim Baru
- Paper pulp to Niru
- Cement to Baturaja

Preceding station	Kereta Api Indonesia	Following station
Cempaka towards Prabumulih	Prabumulih–Panjang	Candimas towards Panjang
