= Lahat railway station =

Lahat railway station may refer to:

- Lahat railway station (Indonesia), a railway station in Lahat Regency, South Sumatra
- Lahat railway station (Malaysia), a railway station in Ipoh, Perak
