= Kota Padang railway station =

Railway station in Indonesia

Kota Padang Station Stasiun Kota Padang
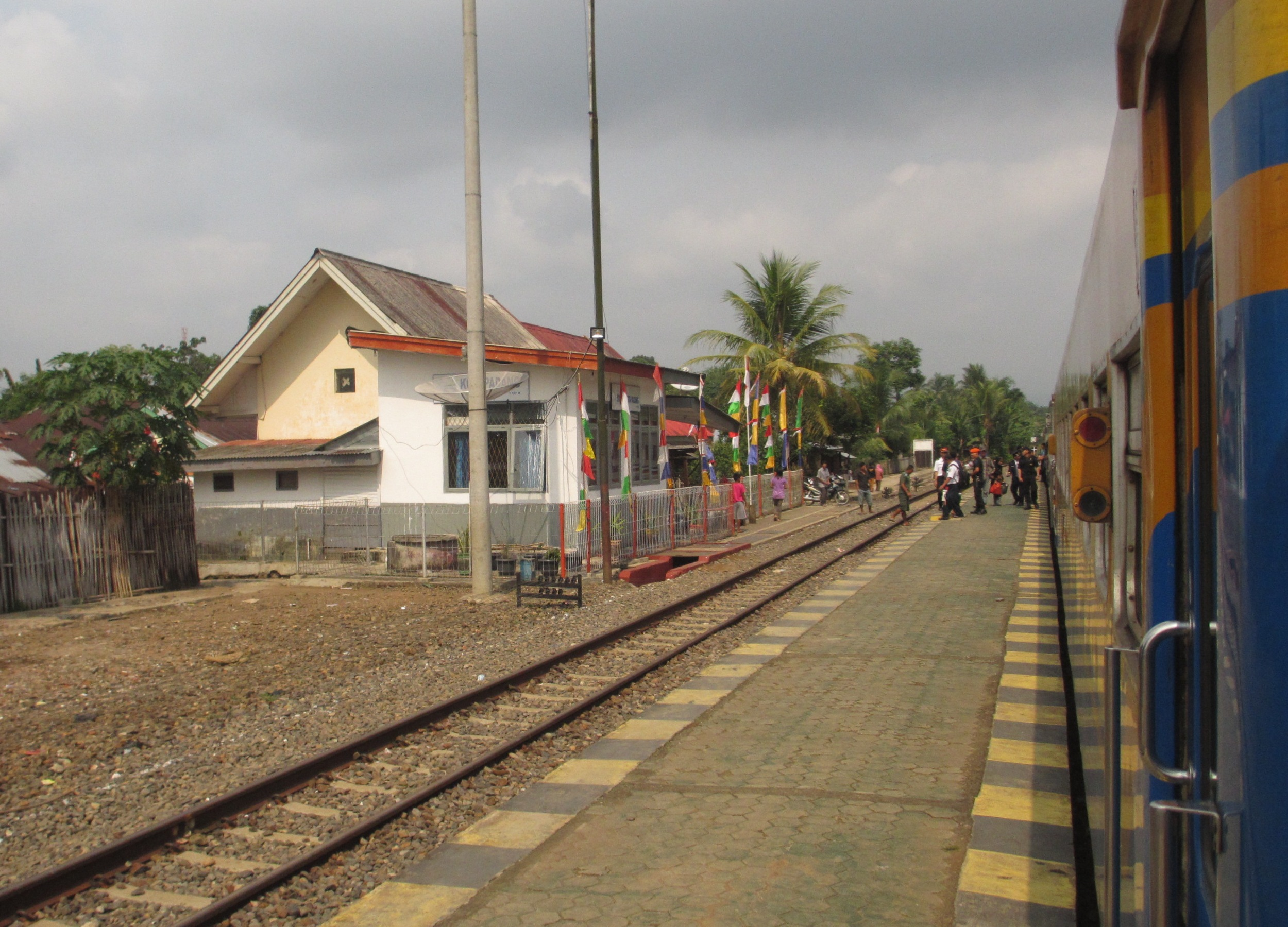
- Kota Padang Station in 2015

General information
- Location: Dusun Baru, Kota Padang, Rejang Lebong Regency, Bengkulu, Indonesia
- Coordinates: 3.426666°S 102.966000°E
- Elevation: +107m
- Owner: Kereta Api Indonesia
- Manager: Kereta Api Indonesia
- Line: Lubuklinggau–Prabumulih
- Platforms: 2
- Tracks: 2

Other information
- Station code: KOP • 6004
- Classification: Class III

History
- Original company: Zuid-Sumatra Staatsspoorwegen
Location
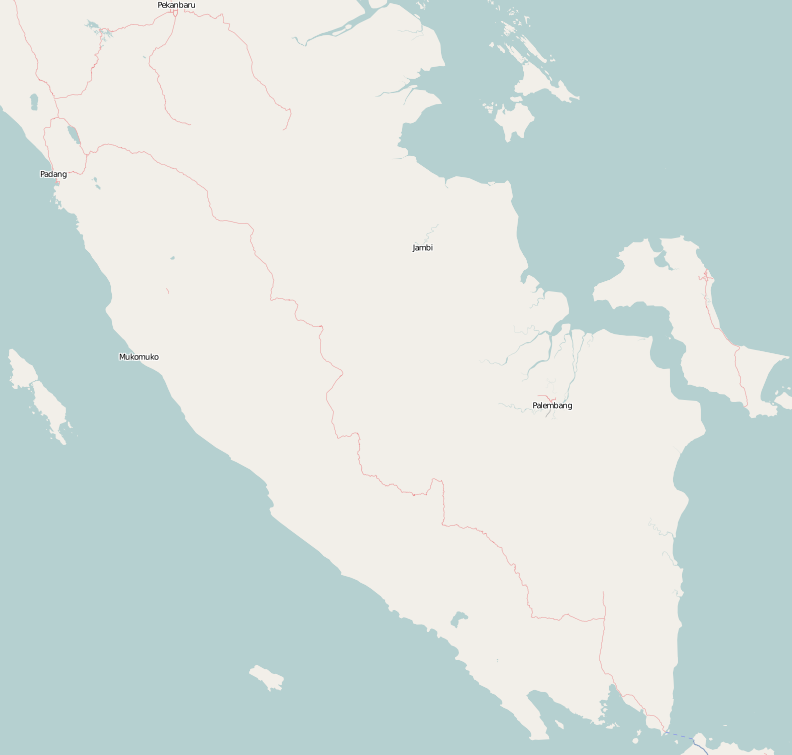
- Location within Southern Sumatra

Kota Padang Station (KOP) (alternatively Kotapadang Station) is a class III railway station located in Kota Padang District, Rejang Lebong Regency, Bengkulu, Indonesia. The station is located at an altitude of +107 meters and is operated by the Regional Division III Palembang of Kereta Api Indonesia. As of 2023, Kota Padang Station is the only railway station located in Bengkulu province.

== Services ==
=== Passenger services ===
- Economy class
  - Serelo, from Kertapati and to Lubuklinggau

Preceding station	Kereta Api Indonesia	Following station
Lubuklinggau	Lubuklinggau–Prabumulih	Muara Saling towards Prabumulih
