= Tanjung Karang =

Tanjung Karang or Tanjong Karang may refer to:

== Indonesia ==
- Tanjung Karang, Lampung, one of two large settlements which merged in 1983 to form Bandar Lampung
- Tanjung Karang railway station, a railway station in Bandar Lampung

== Malaysia ==
- Tanjong Karang, Selangor, a town in Kuala Selangor District, Selangor
- Tanjong Karang (federal constituency), represented in the Dewan Rakyat
- Tanjong Karang (state constituency), see List of Malaysian State Assembly Representatives (1969–1974) § Selangor
