= Ketanggungan Barat railway station =

Railway station in Indonesia

Ketanggungan Barat Station Stasiun Ketanggungan Barat
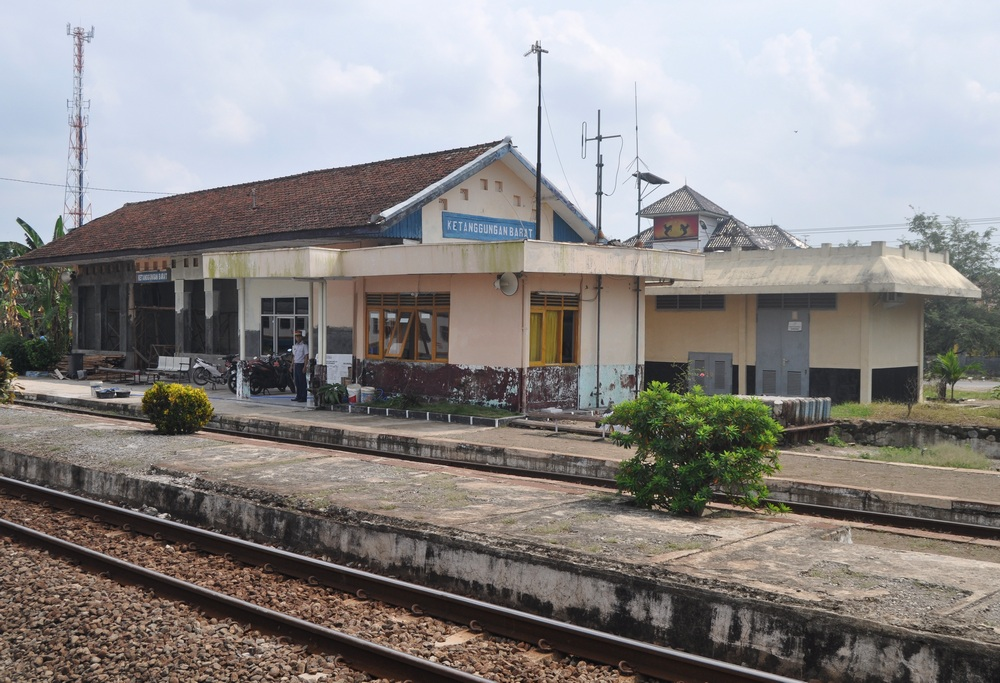
- Ketanggungan Barat Station

General information
- Location: Cigedog, Kersana, Brebes Regency; Central Java; Indonesia
- Coordinates: 6.92932°S 108.856°E
- Elevation: +16 m (52 ft)
- Owner: Kereta Api Indonesia
- Operator: Kereta Api Indonesia
- Line: Cirebon Prujakan–Prupuk–Tegal
- Platforms: 1 island platform 1 side platform
- Tracks: 2

Construction
- Structure type: Ground
- Parking: Available
- Accessible: Available

Other information
- Status: Inactive
- Station code: KGB
- Classification: Class III

History
- Opened: 1 July 1916
- Closed: 15 December 2014
Location
- Location within Java

Ketanggungan Barat Station (KGB) is an inactive class III railway station located in Cigedog, Kersana, Brebes Regency. The station, which is located at an altitude of +16 m, is included in the Operational Area III Cirebon and is a railway station that is located in the westernmost part of Central Java through the Cirebon–Prupuk segment.

At the time this station was still active, this station had three railway tracks with track 2 as a straight line. Since 15 December 2014, this station has been inactive due to double-track operation on the Ciledug–Larangan segment. In addition to the double tracks operation, the minimum occupancy and the station's location that is too close to the Ketanggungan station causes this station to be closed.

== Services ==
There are no services at this station after the double tracks were operational.

== Incidents ==
On 25 December 2001 at 04.32, the Empu Jaya train crashed into the Gaya Baru Malam Selatan train, which was stopped. Dozens of passengers died and dozens were injured.

Preceding station	Kereta Api Indonesia	Following station
Ciledug towards Cirebon Prujakan	Cirebon Prujakan–Prupuk–Tegal; CNP–PPK	Ketanggungan towards Prupuk
