= List of railway stations in Indonesia =

Railway stations in Indonesia, operated by Indonesia's national rail operator, Kereta Api Indonesia, include:

== Jakarta ==
Station	Code	Year opened	Status	Height (masl)	Operational area/regional division
Ancol	AC		Active	+4 m	Daop I Jakarta
Angke	AK	1899	Active	+3 m	Daop I Jakarta
BNI City	BNC	2017	Active	+6 m	Daop I Jakarta
Bojong Indah	BOI		Active	+6 m	Daop I Jakarta
Buaran	BUA		Active	+11 m	Daop I Jakarta
Cakung	CUK		Active	+18 m	Daop I Jakarta
Cawang	CW		Active	+26 m	Daop I Jakarta
Cikini	CKI		Active	+20 m	Daop I Jakarta
Cipinang	CPN		Active	+14 m	Daop I Jakarta
Duren Kalibata	DRN		Active	+26 m	Daop I Jakarta
Duri	DU	1899	Active	+4 m	Daop I Jakarta
Gambir	GMR	1884, 1992 (new building)	Active	+16 m	Daop I Jakarta
Gang Sentiong	GST		Active	+7 m	Daop I Jakarta
Gondangdia	GDD		Active	+17 m	Daop I Jakarta
Grogol	GGL	2015	Active	+98 m	Daop I Jakarta
Jakarta Gudang	JAKG		Active	+4 m	Daop I Jakarta
Jakarta Kota	JAKK	1887	Active	+4 m	Daop I Jakarta
Jatinegara	JNG	1910	Active	+16 m	Daop I Jakarta
Jayakarta	JAY		Active	+13 m	Daop I Jakarta
Jakarta International Stadium	JIS	2026	Active		Daop I Jakarta
Juanda	JUA		Active	+15 m	Daop I Jakarta
Kalideres	KDS	1899	Active	+7 m	Daop I Jakarta
Kampung Bandan	KPB		Active	+3 m	Daop I Jakarta
Karet	KAT	1922	Defunct	+11 m	Daop I Jakarta
Kebayoran	KBY	1899	Active	+4,2 m	Daop I Jakarta
Kemayoran	KMO		Active	+4,2 m	Daop I Jakarta
Klender	KLD		Active	+10 m	Daop I Jakarta
Klender Baru	KLDB		Active	+11 m	Daop I Jakarta
Kramat	KMT		Active	+10 m	Daop I Jakarta
Lenteng Agung	LNA		Active	+57 m	Daop I Jakarta
Mampang	MPG		Defunct	-	Daop I Jakarta
Mangga Besar	MGB		Active	+14 m	Daop I Jakarta
Manggarai	MRI		Active	+13 m	Daop I Jakarta
Matraman	MTR	2022	Active	-	Daop I Jakarta
Palmerah	PLM	1899	Active	+13 m	Daop I Jakarta
Pasar Minggu	PSM		Active	+36 m	Daop I Jakarta
Pasar Minggu Baru	PSMB		Active	+29 m	Daop I Jakarta
Pasar Senen	PSE		Active	+4,7 m	Daop I Jakarta
Pasoso	PSO		Active	+4 m	Daop I Jakarta
Pesing	PSG	1899	Active	+5 m	Daop I Jakarta
Pondok Jati	POK		Active	+14 m	Daop I Jakarta
Rajawali	RJW		Active	+4 m	Daop I Jakarta
Rawa Buaya	RW	1899	Active	+6 m	Daop I Jakarta
Sawah Besar	SW	1873	Active	+15 m	Daop I Jakarta
Sudirman	SUD		Active	+5,65 m	Daop I Jakarta
Sungai Lagoa	SAO		Active	+4 m	Daop I Jakarta
Taman Kota	TKO	2015	Active	+12 m	Daop I Jakarta
Tanah Abang	THB	1899	Active	+9 m	Daop I Jakarta
Tanjung Barat	TNT		Active	+44 m	Daop I Jakarta
Tanjung Priuk	TPK		Active	+4 m	Daop I Jakarta
Tebet	TEB		Active	+17 m	Daop I Jakarta
Universitas Pancasila	UP		Active	+57 m	Daop I Jakarta

== Banten ==
Station	Code	Year opened
Anyer Kidul	ANK	
Anyer Lor	ANL	
Batu Ceper	BPR	
Catang	CT	
Cicayur	CC	
Cigading	CGD	
Cikeusal	CKL	
Cikoya	CKY	
Cilegon	CLG	
Cisauk	CSK	
Citeras	CTR	
Daru	DAR	
Jambu Baru	JBU	
Jatake	JTK	2026
Jurangmangu	JMG	2009 (reopened)
Karangantu	KRA	
Krenceng	KEN	
Maja	MJ	
Merak	MER	
Pondok Ranji	PDJ	
Poris	PI	
Rangkasbitung	RK	
Rawa Buntu	RU	
Serang	SG	
Serpong	SRP	
SHIA	BST	2017
Sudimara	SDM	
Tanah Tinggi	TTI	2015
Tangerang	TNG	1899
Tigaraksa	TGS	
Tigaraksa Kota Podomoro		
Tonjong Baru	TOJ	
Walantaka	WLT	

== West Java ==
Station	Code	Year opened
Andir	AND	
Arjawinangun	AWN	
Awipari	AW	
Babakan	BBK	
Bandung	BD	
Bangoduwa	BDW	
Banjar	BJR	
Batutulis	BTT	
Bekasi	BKS	
Bekasi Timur	BKST	
Bogor	BOO	1881
Bogor Paledang	PLG	2013
Bojong	BJG	
Bojong Gede	BJD	
Bumiwaluya	BMW	
Cangkring	CNK	
Ciamis	CI	
Cianjur	CJ	
Ciawi	CAW	
Cibadak	CBD	
Cibatu	CB	
Cibeber	CBB	
Cibinong	CBN	
Cibitung	CIT	
Cibungur	CBR	
Cicalengka	CCL	
Cicurug	CCR	
Cijambe	CJE	
Ciganea	CA	
Cigombong	CGB	
Cikadongdong	CD	
Cikampek	CKP	
Cikarang	CKR	
Cikaum	CKM	
Cikudapateuh	CTH	
Cilaku	CLK	
Cilame	CLE	
Cilebut	CLT	
Ciledug	CLD	
Cilegeh	CLH	
Cilejit	CJT	
Cimahi	CMI	
Cimekar	CMK	
Cimindi	CMD	
Ciomas	CS	
Cipatat	CPT	
Cipeundeuy	CPD	
Cipeuyeum	CPY	
Cipunegara	CRA	
Cirahayu	CAA	
Ciranjang	CRJ	
Cirebon	CN	
Cirebon Prujakan	CNP	
Cireungas	CRG	
Ciroyom	CIR	
Cisaat	CSA	
Cisomang	CG	
Citayam	CTA	
Dawuan	DWN	
Depok	DP	1873
Depok Baru	DPB	
Gadobangkong	GK	
Garut	GRT	1899–1983, 2022 (re-opening)
Gandasoli	GDS	
Gedebage	GDB	
Gunung Putri	GPI	
Haurgeulis	HGL	
Haurpugur	HRP	
Indihiang	IH	
Jatibarang	JTB	
Kadokangabus	KAB	
Kaliwedi	KLW	
Karangpucung	KNP	
Karangsari	KRAI	
Karangsuwung	KRW	
Karangtengah	KE	
Karawang	KW	
Kedunggedeh	KDH	
Kertasemaya	KTM	
Kiaracondong	KAC	
Klari	KLI	
Kosambi	KOS	
Kranji	KRI	
Lampegan	LP	
Langen	LN	
Lebakjero	LBJ	
Leles	LL	
Lemahabang	LMB	
Leuwigoong	LO	
Losari	LOS	
Lumpang Parayasa		
Luwung	LWG	
Maleber	MLB	
Manonjaya	MNJ	
Maseng	MSG	
Maswati	MSI	
Metland Telagamurni	MTM	
Nagreg	NG	
Nambo	NMO	
Pabuaran	PAB	
Padalarang	PDL	
Parung Kuda	PRK	
Parung Panjang	PRP	
Pasirbungur	PAS	
Pasirhayam	PH	
Pasirjengkol	PSJ	
Pegaden Baru	PGB	
Plered	PLD	
Pondok Cina	POC	
Pondok Leungsir	PON	
Pondok Rajeg	PDRG	
Pringkasap	PRI	
Purwakarta	PWK	
Rajamandala	RM	
Rajapolah	RJP	
Rancaekek	RCK	
Ranji	RI	
Rendeh	RH	
Sadang	SAD	
Sasaksaat	SKT	
Selajambe	SLJ	
Sindanglaut	SDU	
Sindangresmi	SSI	
Sukabumi	SI	
Sukaresmi		
Sukatani	SUT	
Tagogapu	TAU	
Tambun	TB	
Tanjungrasa	TJS	
Tasikmalaya	TSM	
Telagasari	TLS	
Tenjo	TEJ	
Terisi	TIS	
Universitas Indonesia	UI	
Wanaraja	WNR	
Waruduwur	WDW	
Warungbandrek	WB	

== Central Java ==
Station	Code	Year opened
Adisoemarmo	SMO	2019
Alastua	ATA	1867
Ambarawa	ABR	1873
Balapulang	BLP	
Banjaran	BJN	
Batang	BTG	1898, 2013 (new building)
Bedono	BDN	1905
Brambanan	BBN	
Brebes	BB	
Bringin	BRI	1873
Brumbung	BBG	1867
Bulakamba	BKA	
Bumiayu	BMA	
Butuh	BTH	
Candi Umbul	CAI	1905
Ceper	CE	1871
Cepu	CU	
Cilacap	CP	
Cipari	CPI	
Comal	CO	
Delanggu	DL	
Doplang	DPL	
Gambringan	GBN	
Gandrungmangun	GDM	
Gawok	GW	
Gedangan	GN	
Gemawang	GWG	1905
Gombong	GB	
Goprak	GPK	
Grabag Merbabu	GMB	1905
Gubug	GUB	
Gumilir	GM	
Gundih	GD	
Ijo	IJ	
Jambon	JBN	
Jambu	JMB	1905
Jenar	JN	
Jerakah	JRK	
Jeruklegi	JRL	
Jetis	JIS	
Kadipiro	KDO	2019
Kalibodri	KBD	
Kalioso	KO	
Kaliwung	KLN	
Kapuan	KPA	
Karanganyar	KA	
Karanggandul	KGD	
Karangjati	KGT	
Karangkandri	KKD	
Karangsari	KRR	
Karangsono	KSO	
Karangtalun	KRL	
Kasugihan	KH	
Kawunganten	KWG	
Kebasen	KBS	
Kebonromo	KRO	
Kebumen	KM	
Kedungbanteng	KDB	
Kedungjati	KEJ	1868
Kemiri	KMR	
Kemranjen	KJ	
Kendal	KL	1897
Ketanggungan	KGG	
Ketanggungan Barat	KGB	
Ketandan	KET	
Klaten	KT	
Kradenan	KNN	
Krengseng	KNS	
Kretek	KRT	
Kroya	KYA	
Kuripan	KRP	
Kudaile	KDE	
Kutoarjo	KTA	
Kutowinangun	KWN	
Larangan	LRA	
Larangan	LR	
Lebeng	LBG	
Legok	LGK	
Linggapura	LG	
Mangkang	MKG	
Maos	MA	
Margasari	MGS	
Masaran	MSR	
Meluwung	MLW	
Montelan	MTL	
Ngrombo	NBO	
Notog	NTG	
Padas	PDS	
Palur	PL	
Panunggalan	PNL	
Pasarnguter	PNT	
Patuguran	PAT	
Pekalongan	PK	
Pemalang	PML	
Petarukan	PTA	
Plabuan	PLB	
Prembun	PRB	
Prupuk	PPK	
Purwokerto	PWT	
Purworejo	PWR	
Purwosari	PWS	
Randegan	RDN	
Randublatung	RBG	
Salem	SLM	
Sedadi	SDI	
Semarang Gudang	SMG	
Semarang Poncol	SMC	1914
Semarang Tanjung Emas	SMH	
Semarang Tawang	SMT	1914
Sidareja	SDR	
Sikampuh	SKP	
Slawi	SLW	
Soka	SOA	
Solo Balapan	SLO	
Solo Jebres	SK	
Solo Kota	STA	
Songgom	SGG	
Sragen	SR	
Sragi	SRI	
Srowot	SWT	
Sruweng	SRW	
Sukoharjo	SKH	
Sulur	SL	
Sumberlawang	SUM	
Sumpiuh	SPH	
Surodadi	SD	
Tambak	TBK	
Tanggung	TGG	1867
Tanjung	TGN	
Tegal	TG	
Tegowanu	TGW	
Telawa	TW	
Tuntang	TTG	1873
Ujungnegoro	UJN	
Wadu	WDU	
Weleri	WLR	
Wojo	WJ	
Wonogiri	WNG	
Wonosari	WNS	

== Special Region of Yogyakarta ==
Station	Code	Year opened
Kalasan	KLS	
Kalimenur	KLR	
Kedundang	KDG	
Lempuyangan	LPN	1872
Maguwo	MGW	
Patukan	PTN	
Rewulu	RWL	
Sentolo	STL	
Wates	WT	
Yogyakarta	YK	1887

== East Java ==
Station	Code	Year opened
Ajung	AJU	
Argopuro	AGO	1985
Arjasa	AJ	
Babadan	BBD	
Babat	BBT	
Bagor	BGR	
Bangil	BG	
Bangsalsari	BGS	
Banjarkemantren	BJK	2004
Banyuwangi	BW	
Banyuwangi Kota	BWI	1985
Baron	BRN	
Bayeman	BYM	
Benowo	BNW	
Benteng	BET	
Blimbing	BMG	
Blitar	BL	1882
Boharan	BH	
Bojonegoro	BJ	1902
Bondowoso	BO	1897
Bonosare	BNS	
Bowerno	BWO	
Buduran	BDR	2004
Caruban	CRB	
Cerme	CME	
Curahmalang	CRM	
Damarsi	BSL	
Duduk	DD	
Garahan	GRN	
Garum	GRM	
Gebang	GEL	
Gedangan	GDG	
Gembong	GEB	
Geneng	GG	
Glenmore	GLM	
Grati	GI	
Gresik	GS	
Grujugan	GRJ	
Gunung Gangsir	GNG	
Indro	IDO	
Jati	JI	
Jatiroto	JTR	
Jember	JR	1897
Jemursari	JMS	2004
Jombang	JG	
Jorongan	JOR	
Kabat	KBT	
Kalibagor	KLB	
Kalibaru	KBR	
Kaliboto	KLO	
Kalimas	KLM	
Kalisat	KLT	
Kalisetail	KSL	
Kalitidu	KIT	
Kandangan	KDA	
Kapas	KPS	
Kedinding	KDN	
Kediri	KD	1882
Kedunggalar	KG	
Kempit	KMP	
Kepanjen	KPN	
Kertomenanggal	KTL	2004
Kertosono	KTS	1881
Kesamben	KSB	
Ketapang	KTG	1985
Klakah	KK	
Kotok	KTK	
Kras	KRS	
Kraton	KN	
Krian	KRN	
Krikilan	KKL	
Kumendung	KMG	
Lamongan	LMG	
Lawang	LW	
Leces	LEC	
Ledokombo	LDO	
Madiun	MN	1882
Magetan	MAG	1883
Malang	ML	1879
Malang Kotalama	MLK	1896
Malasan	MLS	
Mangli	MI	
Margorejo	MGR	2004
Mesigit	MST	
Minggiran	MGN	
Mojokerto	MR	
Mrawan	MRW	
Ngadiluih	NDL	
Ngagel	NGA	2004
Nganjuk	NJ	
Ngawi	NGW	1883
Ngebruk	NB	
Ngujang	NJG	
Ngunut	NT	
Padangan	PGN	
Pagerwojo	PWJ	2004
Pakisaji	PSI	
Panarukan	PNR	1897
Papar	PPR	
Pasuruan	PS	1878
Peterongan	PTR	
Petung	PET	
Pogajih	PGJ	
Porong	PR	
Prajekan	PRJ	
Prambon	PBN	
Probolinggo	PB	
Pucuk	PC	
Purwoasri	PWA	
Rambipuji	RBP	
Randuagung	RDA	
Ranuyoso	RN	
Rejoso	RO	
Rejotangan	RJ	
Rogojampi	RGP	
Saradan	SRD	
Sawotratap	STP	2004
Sembung	SMB	
Sempolan	SPL	
Sengon	SN	
Sepanjang	SPJ	
Sidoarjo	SDA	
Sidotopo	SDT	
Singojuruh	SGJ	
Singosari	SGS	
Situbondo	SIT	
Sroyo	SYO	
Sukomoro	SKM	
Sukorejo	SKJ	
Sukosari	SSR	
Sukowono	SKW	
Sumberbaru	SBB	
Sumberrejo	SRJ	
Sumbergempol	SBL	
Sumperpucung	SBP	
Sumbersalak	SBS	
Suberwadung	SWD	
Sumobito	SBO	
Surabaya Gubeng	SGU	1878
Surabaya Kota	SB	1878
Surabaya Pasar Turi	SBI	1900
Surabayan	SBN	2016
Susuhan	SS	
Talun	TAL	
Tamanan	TMN	
Tandes	TES	
Tanggul	TGL	
Tanggulangin	TGA	
Tangsil	TGS	
Tapen	TAP	
Tarik	TRK	
Temuguruh	TGR	
Tobo	TBO	
Tribungan	TBG	
Tulangan	TLN	
Tulungagung	TA	
Walikukun	WK	
Waru	WR	
Wilangan	WLG	
Wlingi	WG	
Wonokerto	WN	
Wonokromo	WO	

== Aceh ==
Station	Code	Year opened
Bungkaih	BKH	2013
Geurugok	GRU	
Krueng Geukueh	KRG	2013
Krueng Mane	KRM	2013
Kutablang	KKG	
Muara Satu	MUS	1 February 2025

== North Sumatra ==
Station	Code	Year opened
Aek Loba	AKB	
Aek Nabara		
Araskabu	ARB	
Bahlias	BLI	
Bajalinggei	BJL	
Bamban	BMB	
Bandar Khalipah	BAP	
Bandar Tinggi	BDT	
Batang Kuis	BTK	
Belawan	BLW	
Besitang	BSG	
Binjai	BIJ	
Bunut	BUU	
Dolok Merangir	DMR	
Dusun	DSU	
Hengelo	HL	
Gebang	GBA	
Kisaran	KIS	
Kualanamu	KNM	2012
Kuala Bingei	KUN	
Kuala Tanjung	KTJ	
Labuan	LBU	
Laut Tador	LTD	
Lidah Tanah	LDT	
Limapuluh	LMP	
Lubuk Pakam	LBP	
Mambang Muda	MBM	
Marbau	MBU	
Medan	MDN	
Medan Pasar	MDP	
Naga Kasiangan	NGK	
Padanghalaban	PHA	
Pamingke	PME	
Pangkalan Brandan	PBD	
Pelabuhan Kuala Tanjung	PKT	
Perbaungan	PBA	
Perlanaan	PRA	
Pulu Brayan	PUB	
Pulu Raja	PUR	
Rampah	RPH	
Rambutan	RMT	
Rantau Prapat	RAP	
Sei Bejangkar	SJB	
Sei Mangkei		
Siantar	SIR	
Situngir	SIU	
Stabat	SBT	
Tanjungbalai	TNB	
Tanjung Gading	TGD	
Tanjung Pura	TPU	
Tanjung Selamat	TAS	
Tebing Tinggi	TBI	
Teluk Dalam	TUK	
Teluk Mengkudu	TKE	
Titi Papan	TPP	

== West Sumatra ==
Station	Code	Year opened
Air Tawar	ART	
Alai	AI	
Batu Tabal	BTL	
Bukittinggi	BKT	
Bukit Putus	BKP	
Cimparuh	CPH	1908
Duku	DUK	
Indarung	IDA	
Kacang	KCN	
Kandang Ampat	KDP	
Kayu Tanam	KTN	
Kampung Jua	KAJ	1979, 18 December 2024
Kubukrambil	KKR	
Kurai Taji	KI	
Lubuk Alung	LA	
Lubuk Buaya	LBY	
Minangkabau	BIM	2018
Muarakalaban	MKB	
Naras	NRS	1911
Padang	PD	1891
Padang Panjang	PP	
Pariaman	PMN	
Parit Malintang	PRM	
Pasarusang	PRU	
Pauh Kembar	PAK	
Pauh Lima	IMA	
Pulau Aie	PLA	
Sawahlunto	SWL	1894
Sicincin	SCN	
Singkarak	SKA	
Solok	SLK	
Sungai Lassi	SNL	
Tabing	TAB	
Tarandam	TDA	

== Bengkulu ==
Station	Code	Year opened
Kota Padang	KOP	

== South Sumatra ==
Station	Code	Year opened
Air Asam	ASM	
Air Tuba	ART	
Banjarsari	BJS	
Baturaja	BTA	
Belatung	BLT	
Belimbing Airkaka	BIK	
Belimbing Pendopo	BIB	
Bungamas	BGN	
Durian	DAN	
Gilas	GLS	
Glumbang	GLB	
Gunung Megang	GNM	
Indralaya	IDR	
Karangenda	KED	
Kemelak	KMK	
Kepayang	KPY	2014
Kertapati	KPT	
Kotabaru	KBU	
Kramasan	KAS	
Lahat	LT	
Lembak	LEB	
Lubuklinggau	LLG	
Lubuk Batang	LBP	2014
Lubuk Rukam	LRM	
Martapura	MP	
Metur	MET	
Muara Saling	MSL	
Muara Enim	ME	
Muara Gula	MRL	
Niru	NRU	
Pagar Gunung	PGG	
Payakabung	PYK	
Penanggiran	PGR	
Penimur	PNM	
Peninjawan	PNW	
Prabumulih	PBM	
Prabumulih Baru X5	PBR X5	
Prabumulih Baru X6	PBR X6	
Saungnaga	SNA	
Sepancar	SPC	
Serdang	SDN	
Simpang	SIG	
Sukacinta	SCT	
Sukamerindu	SKU	2014
Sukaraja	SUA	
Sungai Tuha	SGT	2014
Talang Baru	TLB	
Talang Padang	TLP	2014
Tanjung Enim	TAM	
Tanjung Enim Baru	TMB	
Tanjung Terang	TGE	2014
Tanjung Rambang	TJR	
Tebing Tinggi	TI	
Tigagajah	TJH	
Ujanmas	UJM	

== Lampung ==
Station	Code	Year opened
Bekri	BKI	
Blambangan Pagar	BBA	
Blambangan Umpu	BBU	
Branti	BTI	
Candimas	CMS	2014
Cempaka	CEP	
Garuntang	GR	
Gedungratu	GDR	2014
Giham	GHM	
Haji Pemanggilan	HJP	
Kalibalangan	KAG	
Ketapang	KTP	
Kotabumi	KB	
Labuanratu	LAR	
Negararatu	NRR	
Negeri Agung	NGN	
Panjang	PJN	
Pidada	PID	
Rejosari	RJS	
Rengas	RGS	
Sukamenanti	SKN	2014
Sulusuban	SLS	
Tanjung Karang	TNK	
Tanjung Rajo	TJO	2014
Tarahan	THN	
Tegineneng	TGI	
Tulungbuyut	TLY	
Way Pisang	WAP	2014
Way Tuba	WAY	

== South Sulawesi ==
Station	Code	Year opened
Barru		
Labakkang		
Lumpue		
Makkasar New Port		
Mandai		
Mandale		
Mangkoso		
Maros		
Ma'rang		
Palanro		
Pangkajene		
Parangloe		
Ramang Ramang		
Soreang		
Takkalasi		
Tanete Rilau		
