= Silampari Airport =

Airport in South Sumatra, Indonesia

Silampari Airport Bandar Udara Silampari
- IATA: LLJ; ICAO: WIPB

Summary
- Airport type: Public
- Owner: Government of Indonesia
- Operator: Directorate General of Civil Aviation
- Serves: Lubuklinggau and Musi Rawas Regency
- Location: Air Kuti, Lubuklinggau Timur, Lubuklinggau, South Sumatra, Indonesia
- Time zone: WIB (UTC+07:00)
- Elevation AMSL: 125 m (410 ft)
- Coordinates: 03°16′48″S 102°55′02″E
- Website: llg.informasibandara.org

Map
- Location in Indonesia

Runways
Direction	Length		Surface
Direction	m	ft	Surface
02/20	2,500	8,202	Asphalt

Statistics (2024)
- Passengers: 99,761 (▲18.7%)
- Cargo (tonnes): 8 (▲25.0%)
- Aircraft movements: 752 (▲14.6%)
- Source: DGCA

Silampari Airport (IATA: LLJ, ICAO: WIPB) is a domestic airport primarily serving the city of Lubuklinggau in South Sumatra, Indonesia. Named after a local folklore, the airport serves as one of the main point of entry to the westernmost region of South Sumatra, particularly Lubuklinggau and the Musi Rawas Regency. It is located approximately 6 kilometers (3.7 miles) from the Lubuklinggau city center. The airport’s location is considered highly strategic, as it sits at the junction of three provinces: South Sumatra, Bengkulu, and Jambi. At present, the airport operates direct flights only to Jakarta, the capital of Indonesia, with services provided by Batik Air. It previously offered flights to Palembang—the provincial capital of South Sumatra—via Wings Air; however, this route was discontinued due to the COVID-19 pandemic.

== History ==
=== Construction and early history ===
Silampari Airport was originally established as a regional rural airstrip and began operations on May 7, 1994, to serve the population of Lubuklinggau, which at the time was still part of Musi Rawas Regency. Construction of the airport began between 1991 and 1992 on a 75-hectare site, funded through the state budget (APBN) and the regional budget (APBD) of Musi Rawas Regency. At the time, the airport had a 990 m × 23 m (3,248 ft × 75 ft) runway, which was capable of accommodating aircraft such as the CASA CN-235. It was inaugurated by the Governor of South Sumatra, Ramli Hasan Basri, and the Minister of Transportation, Haryanto Danutirto. The airport's inauguration was also marked by a test landing conducted by a CASA C-212 aircraft.

The name of the airport is derived from a local folklore. The word Silampari comes from the Palembang language: silam means “disappeared” and pari means “fairy”; kahyangan means “sky” or “heavens”; and tinggi means “high.” It is also the nickname for the city of Lubuklinggau. Initially, the airport only served the Lubuklinggau–Palembang route using a CASA C-212 aircraft with a capacity of 19 passengers. Since its inauguration, Silampari Airport has experienced fluctuations in passenger traffic.

Due to limited operational funding, the airport was closed between 2001 and 2004. Operations resumed in January 2005 with subsidies from the Musi Rawas regional government. Under regional management, the airport continued to be developed on both the airside and landside. In 2008, the runway was extended to approximately 1,350 meters in length and widened to 30 meters. This development formed part of the airport’s broader efforts to enhance its capacity to accommodate flight operations.

In 2013, operational control of the airport was transferred to the Directorate General of Civil Aviation under the Ministry of Transportation. Following the transfer, the airport underwent further redevelopment, including an upgrade and extension of the runway from its original length of 1,500 meters to 2,220 meters to accommodate larger aircraft such as the Boeing 737 and Airbus A320. During this construction period, the airport was temporarily closed. Around the same time, Aviastar launched a new route from Lubuklinggau to Jakarta using a BAE 146-200 aircraft. In 2015, following the end of the subsidy for Aviastar flights, the Lubuklinggau–Jakarta route was subsequently taken over by NAM Air, which operated daily services using Boeing 737-500 aircraft.

=== Contemporary history ===
There have also been proposals to rename the airport to A.K. Gani Airport, in honor of Indonesian revolutionary and national hero Adnan Kapau Gani.

In 2016, the government allocated 160 billion rupiah to expand Silampari Airport in response to growing passenger and air traffic. The expansion project included terminal renovations, reinforcement and widening of the runway, upgrades to the control tower and apron, and the widening of the access road from the main intersection to the airport into a dual carriageway. The runway was expanded from 30 meters to 45 meters, and part of the budget was also used for land acquisition. The expansion was completed in 2019 and officially inaugurated by then-President Joko Widodo on March 8, 2019.

The airport was temporarily closed between 2021 and 2022 due to the COVID-19 pandemic, as airlines suspended operations to Lubuklinggau. Flights resumed in April 2022, when Batik Air launched a Jakarta–Lubuklinggau route using Airbus A320 aircraft. In January 2025, Super Air Jet also commenced services on the Jakarta–Lubuklinggau route with Airbus A320 aircraft, complementing Batik Air's operations. However, the service was discontinued in June 2025 due to low passenger occupancy, leaving Batik Air as the airport's sole airline operator and the Jakarta–Lubuklinggau route as its only scheduled service.

== Facilities and development ==
Between 2016 and 2018, Silampari Airport underwent a major expansion. In 2016, the first phase of terminal construction was initiated. This was followed in 2017 by the development of supporting facilities, including the construction of parking areas, access roads to the new terminal—complete with box culverts and drainage systems—and the procurement and installation of CCTV in the terminal. In 2018, terminal development continued with additional works such as landscaping of the landside area, the installation of the airport's water supply system, and interior finishing of the new terminal.

As a result of these developments, Silampari Airport now features a total passenger terminal area of 5,452 m², with an annual capacity of 300,000 passengers or 386 passengers during peak hours. The terminal includes a 1,365 m² departure area, a 591 m² arrival area, and a 512 m² waiting lounge. It is also equipped with two jet bridges, which were previously used at Soekarno-Hatta International Airport in Jakarta.

The airport provides parking facilities for 209 cars, 110 motorcycles, and 5 buses. On the airside, the runway has been upgraded to 2,220 m × 45 m, allowing it to accommodate narrow-body aircraft such as the Boeing 737 and Airbus A320. Additionally, it features a taxiway measuring 155 m × 23 m and an apron sized at 130 m × 100 m, which can support the movement of up to two Airbus A320 aircraft simultaneously. In the future, the runway is planned to be extended further to 2,500 meters to accommodate larger aircraft such as the Boeing 737-900ER. The apron will also be expanded to support increased aircraft traffic. As part of the apron expansion, parking stands will be constructed to accommodate up to five Boeing 737-900ER aircraft and one ATR 72-500. Approximately 78 billion rupiah has been allocated for these developments.

== Airlines and destinations ==
=== Passenger ===
Airlines	Destinations
Batik Air	Jakarta–Soekarno-Hatta

== Statistics ==
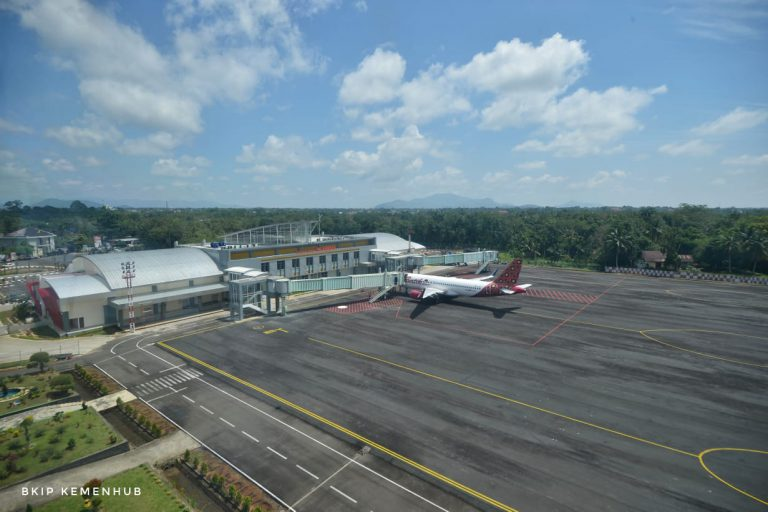
A Batik Air Airbus A320-200 at Silampari Airport

Annual passenger numbers and aircraft statistics
Year	Passengers handled	Passenger % change	Cargo (tonnes)	Cargo % change	Aircraft movements	Aircraft % change
2006	N/A	Steady	N/A	Steady	N/A	Steady
2007	3,084	Steady	18	Steady	24	Steady
2008	N/A	Steady	N/A	Steady	N/A	Steady
2009	N/A	Steady	N/A	Steady	N/A	Steady
2010	N/A	Steady	N/A	Steady	N/A	Steady
2011	20,704	Steady	0.07	Steady	338	Steady
2012	5,405	▼73.9	N/A	Steady	116	▼65.7
2013	6,516	▲20.6	N/A	Steady	90	▼22.4
2014	7,690	▲18.0	N/A	Steady	130	▲44.4
2015	54,171	▲604.4	11	Steady	N/A	Steady
2016	49,846	▼8.0	24	▲118.2	N/A	Steady
2017	143,955	▲188.8	65	▲170.8	N/A	Steady
2018	200,409	▲39.2	112	▲72.3	2,141	Steady
2019	176,396	▼12.0	138	▲23.2	2,126	▼0.7
2020	47,235	▼73.2	52	▼62.3	632	▼70.3
2021	17,903	▼62.1	8	▼84.6	207	▼67.2
2022	42,866	▲139.4	1	▼87.5	340	▲64.3
2023	84,067	▲96.1	6	▲500.0	642	▲88.8
2024	99,761	▲18.7	8	▲25.0	752	▲14.6
^{Source: DGCA, BPS}
