= Lahat railway station (Indonesia) =

Railway station in Indonesia

Lahat Station Stasiun Lahat
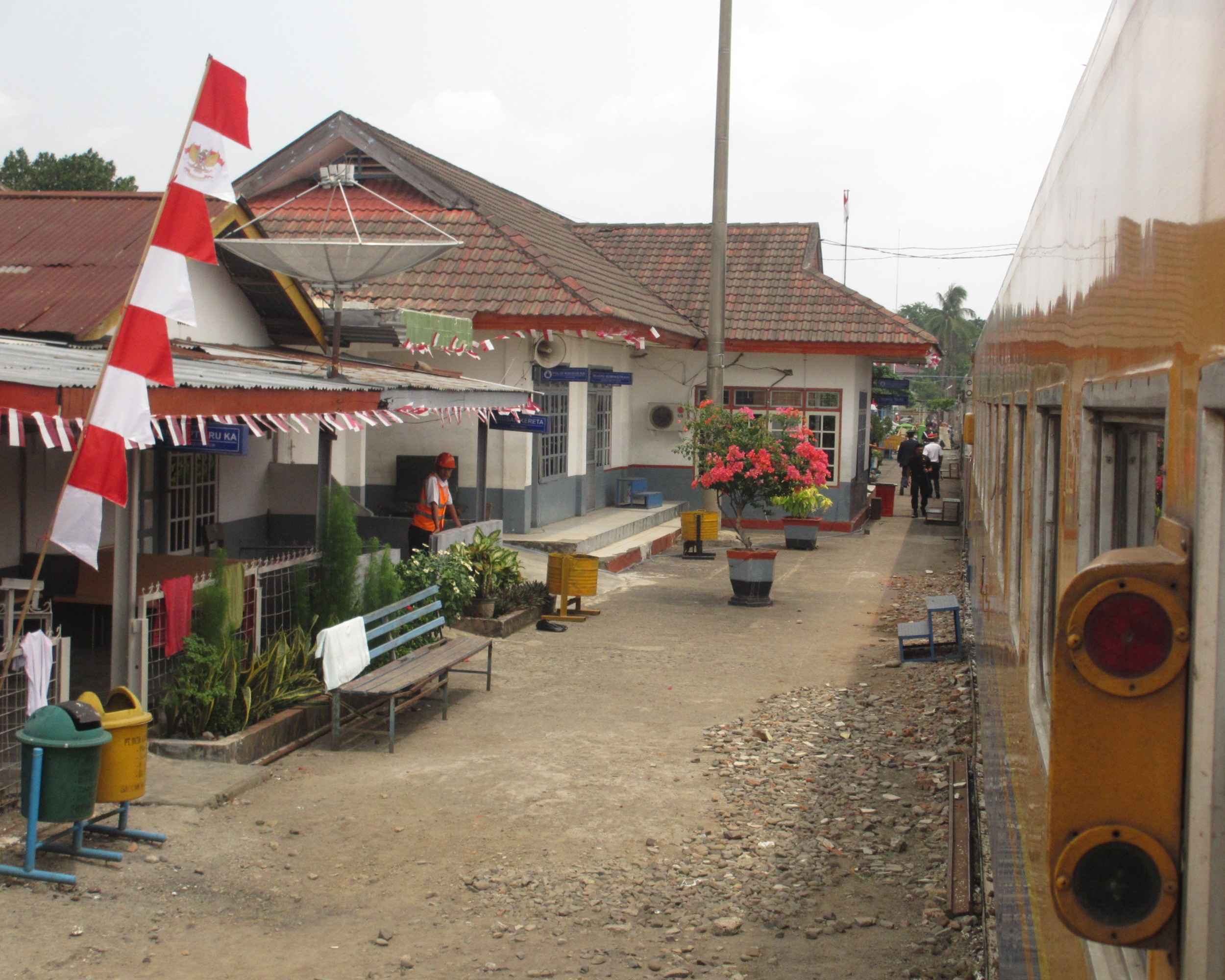
- Lahat Station in 2015

General information
- Location: Jalan Mayor Ruslan, Pasar Baru, Lahat, Lahat Regency, South Sumatra, Indonesia
- Coordinates: 3.789760°S 103.537320°E
- Elevation: +112m
- Owner: Kereta Api Indonesia
- Manager: Kereta Api Indonesia
- Line: Lubuklinggau–Prabumulih
- Tracks: 10

Other information
- Station code: LT • 6200
- Classification: Class I

History
- Opened: 1924
- Original company: Zuid-Sumatra Staatsspoorwegen
Location
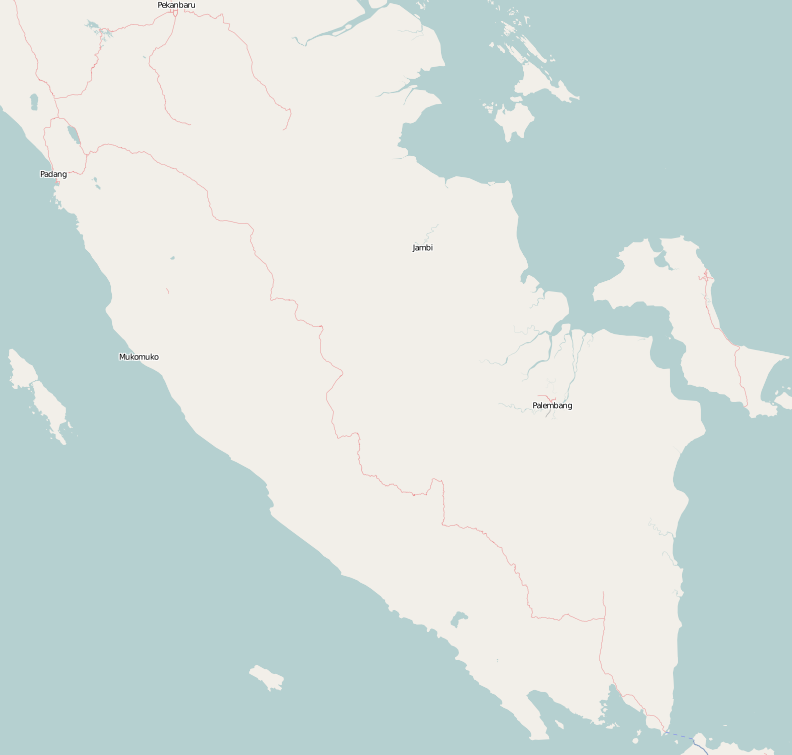
- Location within Southern Sumatra

Lahat Station (LT) is a class I railway station located in Lahat, Lahat Regency, South Sumatra, Indonesia. The station is located at an altitude of +112 meters and is operated by the Regional Division III Palembang of Kereta Api Indonesia.

The Lahat railway workshop is located northeast of the station. The workshop serves as the maintenance facility for locomotives, passenger coaches and freight wagons in southern Sumatra railway operations.

== Services ==
=== Passenger services ===
- Economy class
  - Serelo, from Kertapati and to Lubuklinggau
- Mixed class
  - Sindang Marga, from Kertapati and to Lubuklinggau

=== Freight ===
- Petroleum from Kertapati and Lubuklinggau

== Incident ==
There was a great fire at Lahat Station on 6 April 2021. The fire burned several rooms, including the shunting master's room, storage room, and railway police office. Three firetrucks extinguished the fire.

Preceding station	Kereta Api Indonesia	Following station
Bungamas towards Lubuklinggau	Lubuklinggau–Prabumulih	Sukacinta towards Prabumulih
