= Lubuklinggau =

City in South Sumatra, Indonesia

Lubuk Linggau
- City
- City of Lubuk Linggau; Kota Lubuk Linggau
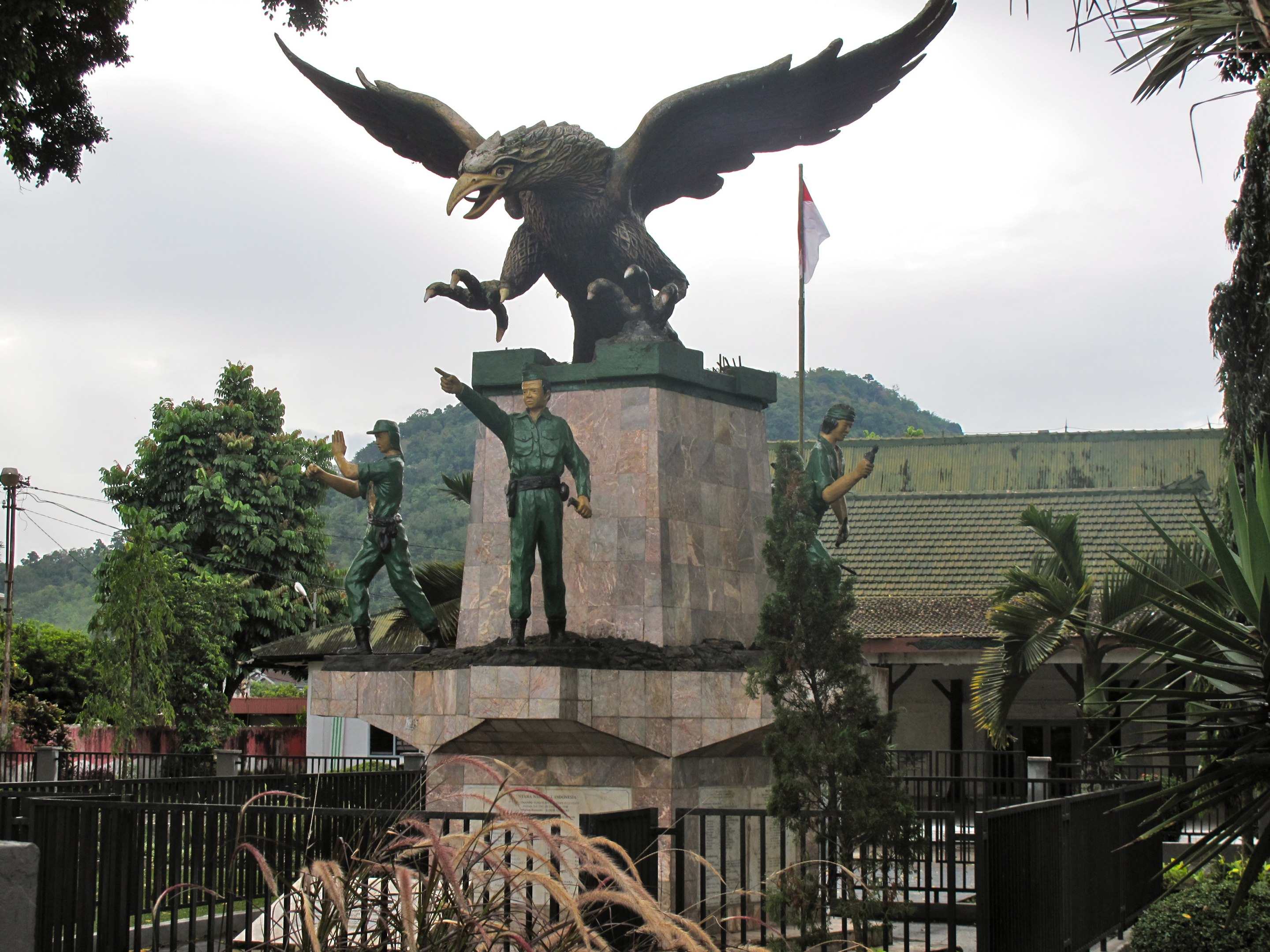
- Museum of the Lubuk Linggau army detachment

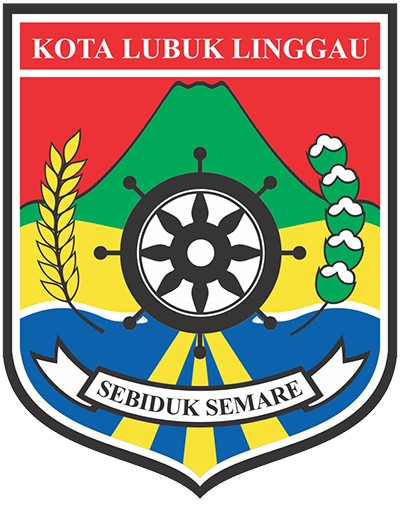
- Coat of arms
- Motto: Sebiduk Semare
- Location within South Sumatra

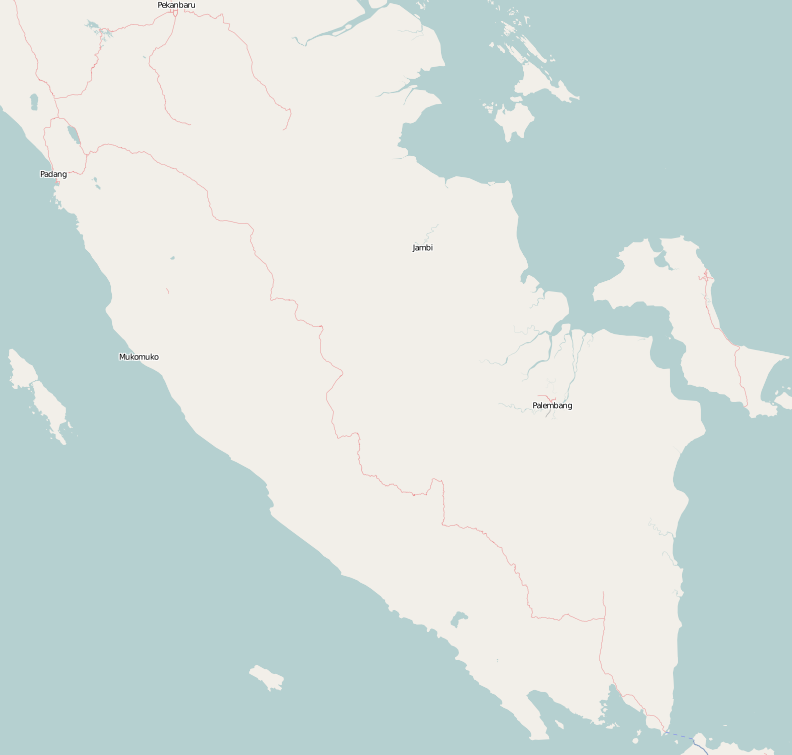
- Location in Southern Sumatra, Sumatra and Indonesia Lubuk Linggau (Sumatra) Lubuk Linggau (Indonesia)
- Coordinates: 3°17′48″S 102°51′42″E
- Country: Indonesia
- Province: South Sumatra
- Founded: 21 June 2001

Government
  - Mayor: Rachmat Hidayat
  - Vice Mayor: Rustam Effendi

Area
  - Total: 367.81 km^{2} (142.01 sq mi)

Population (mid 2025 estimate)
  - Total: 251,457
  - Density: 683.66/km^{2} (1,770.7/sq mi)
  - Rank: 79
- Time zone: UTC+7 (Indonesia Western Time)
- Area code: (+62) 733
- Website: lubuklinggaukota.go.id

Lubuk Linggau (or Lubuklinggau) is a city in South Sumatra, Indonesia. It has an area of 367.81 km^{2} and had a population of 201,308 at the 2010 Census and 234,166 at the 2020 Census; the official estimate as at mid 2025 was 251,457 (comprising 126,712 males and 124,745 females).

Lubuk Linggau is popularly referred to as the "Durian City", owing to its durian production. The city is also known as the "Metropolitan Transit City", due to its location right at the junction of the Trans-Sumatra Highway connecting the provinces of Jambi, Lampung and Bengkulu.

== History ==
The city was formerly the capital of the Musi Rawas Regency from 1956 until it was granted a city status on 21 June 2001, effectively separating it from the regency.

== Geography ==
The city borders the Rejang Lebong Regency in Bengkulu to the south and west. It also borders the Musi Rawas Regency to the north and east.

== Administrative districts ==
The city is divided into eight districts (kecamatan), listed below with their areas and their populations at the 2010 and 2020 Censuses, together with the official estimates as at mid 2025. The table also includes the number of urban villages (all classed as kelurahan) in each district, and its post codes.

Kode Wilayah	Name of District (kecamatan)	Area in km^{2}	Pop'n Census 2010	Pop'n Census 2020	Pop'n Estimate mid 2025	No. of kelurahan	Post code
16.73.02	Lubuk Linggau Barat I	57.74	30,377	38,340	41,631	11	31611 - 31615
16.73.06	Lubuk Linggau Barat II	7.74	21,340	20,938	21,148	8	31611 - 31616
16.73.03	Lubuk Linggau Selatan I	76.47	13,905	16,012	17,896	7	31629
16.73.07	Lubuk Linggau Selatan II	40.19	26,447	33,242	35,961	9	31627
16.73.01	Lubuk Linggau Timur I	14.03	30,685	34,290	36,219	8	31628
16.73.05	Lubuk Linggau Timur II	8.89	30,935	33,023	33,583	9	31621 - 31624
16.73.04	Lubuk Linggau Utara I	139.65	15,313	17,907	19,311	10	31618 - 31619
16.73.08	Lubuk Linggau Utara II	23.10	32,306	40,414	45,708	10	31617, 31619, 31627, 31628
	Totals	367.81	201,308	234,166	251,457	72	

== Transportation ==
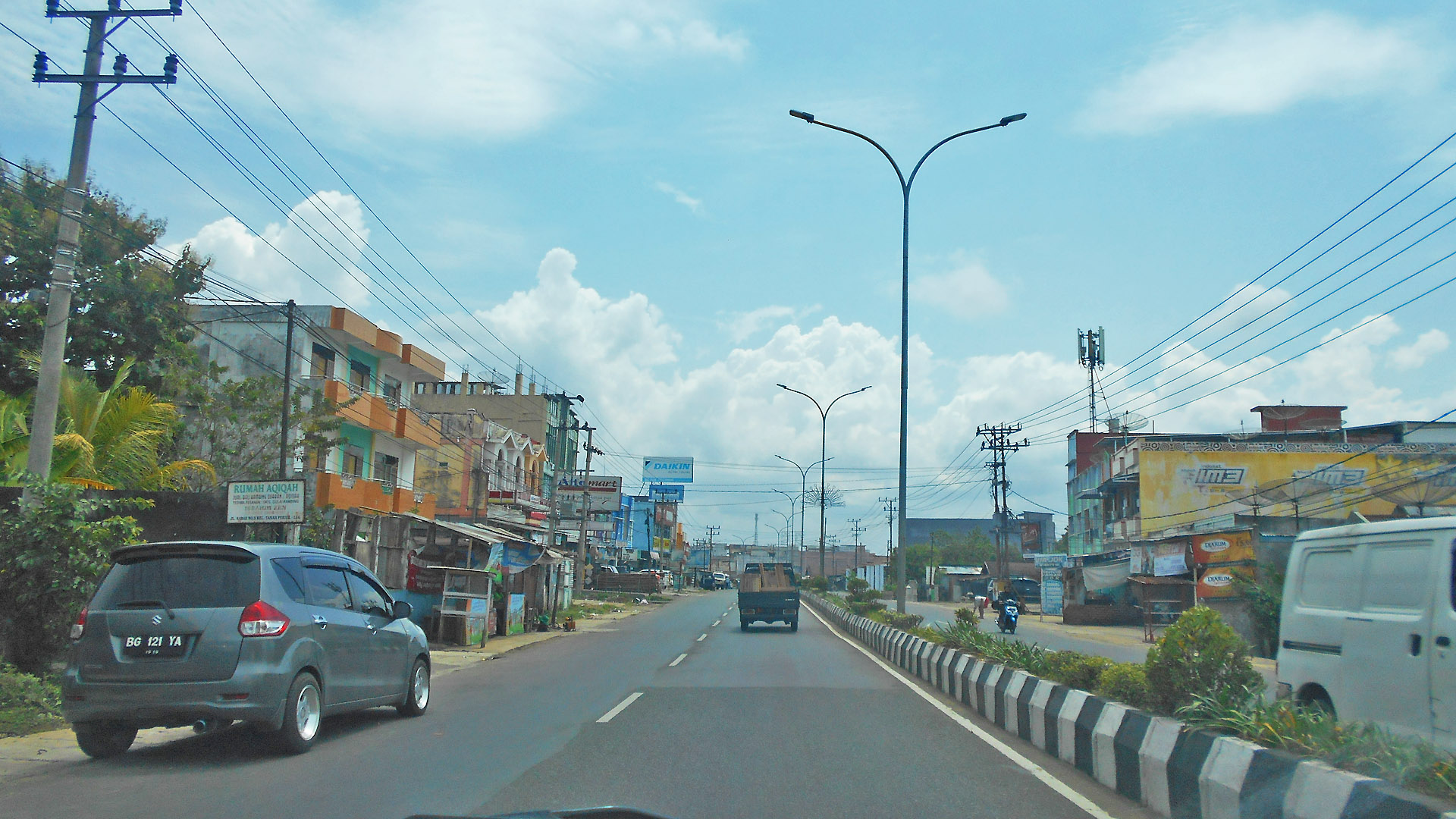
The Trans-Sumatran Highway at Lubuklinggau

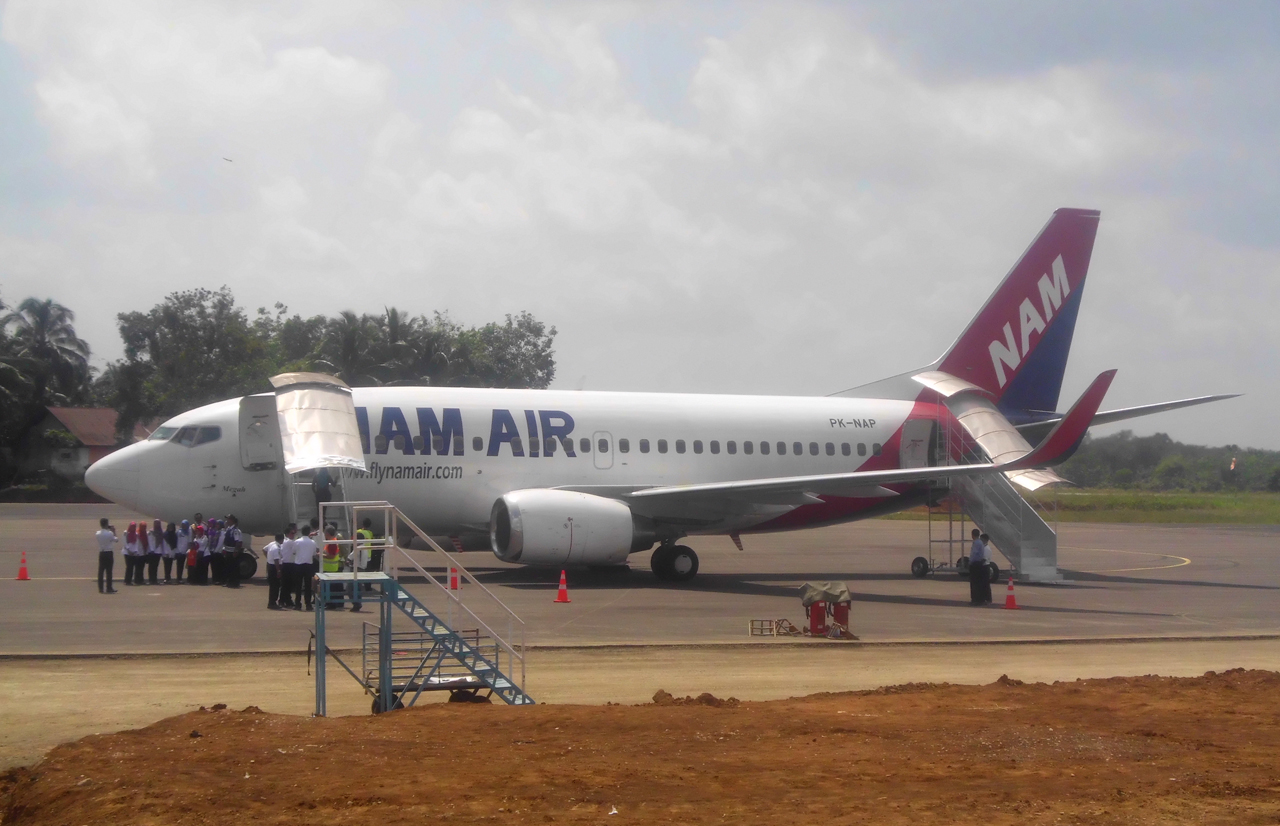
NAM Air Boeing 737-500 at Silampari Airport

Lubuk Linggau is situated on the highway between Palembang and Bengkulu. There are many forms of public transportation in Lubuklinggau, such as becak and angkot. Lubuk Linggau is served by Silampari Airport, which is located around 5 km from the town centre. The airport served several flights to Palembang and Jakarta. Railroad tracks connect Lubuk Linggau with Palembang to the east. There are two daily train trips from the Lubuk Linggau Station to Kertapati Station in Palembang and vice versa.
