= Kersana, Brebes =

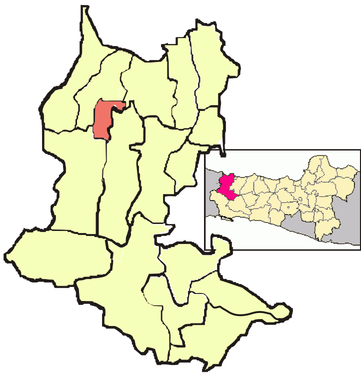
Location in Brebes Regency

Kersana District is the name of an administrative district (Indonesian: Kecamatan) in Brebes Regency, Central Java, Indonesia. It covers 26.97 km^{2} and had a recorded population of 57,854 in the 2010 Census, which increased to 67,322 in the 2020 Census.
