= Lahat (town) =

- Town
- Location of Lahat Regency in South Sumatra
- Coordinates: 3.738340°S 103.566673°E
- Country: Indonesia
- Province: South Sumatra
- Regency: Lahat Regency

Area
  - Total: 107.60 km^{2} (41.54 sq mi)

Population (mid 2024 estimate)
  - Total: 111,384
  - Density: 1,013.3/km^{2} (2,624/sq mi)
- Time zone: UTC+7 (WIB)

Lahat is a town and administrative district which forms the capital of Lahat Regency in South Sumatra, Indonesia. The district covers an area of 107.60 km^{2}, and had a population of 111,384 according to the official estimates for mid 2024. The town is close to the Trans-Sumatra Highway and has good road and rail links to the rest of Sumatra, with daily rail services to Palembang and to Lubuklinggau.
