= Siantar railway station =

Railway station in Indonesia

Siantar Station Stasiun Siantar
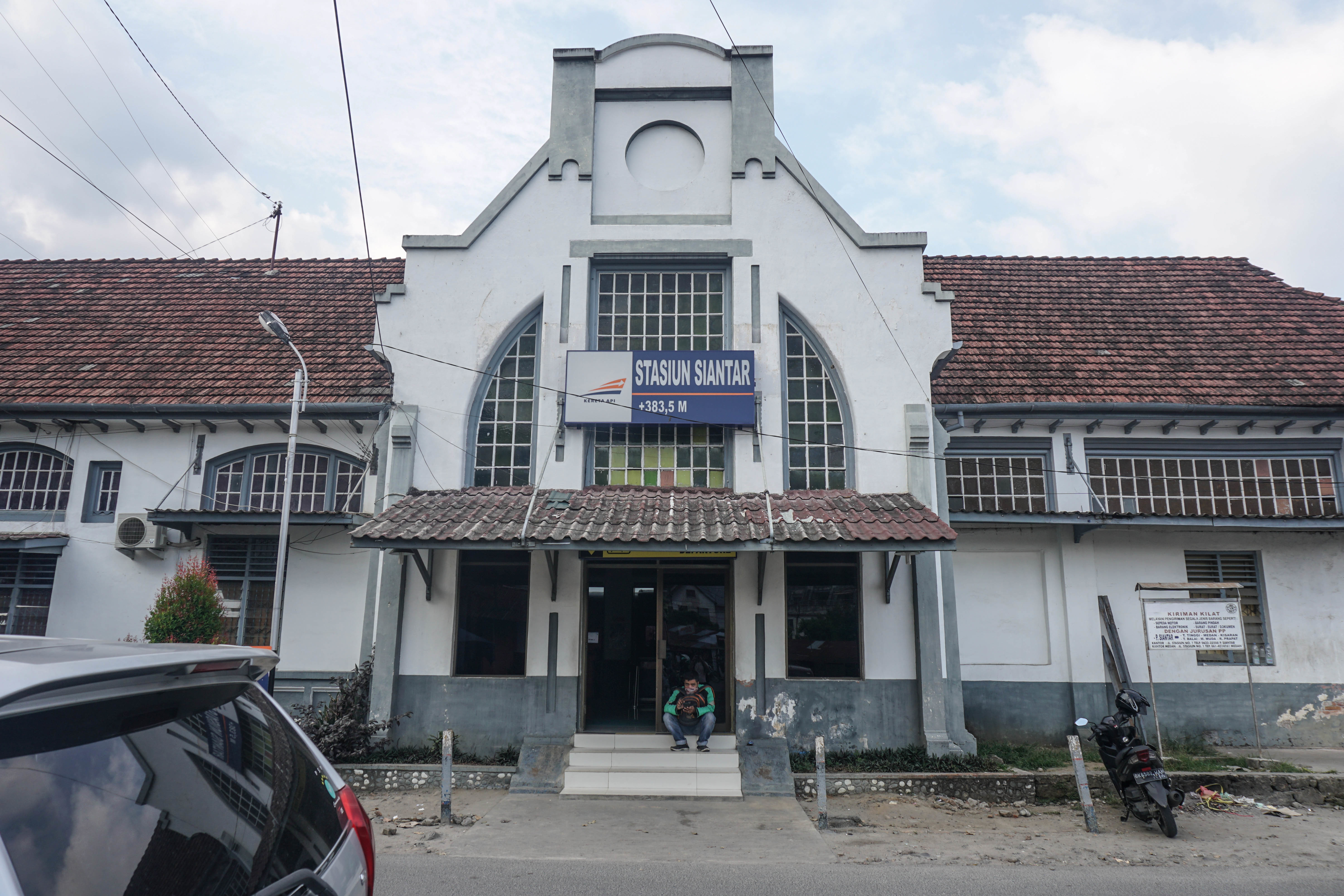
- Siantar Station entrance

General information
- Location: Pematangsiantar; North Sumatra; Indonesia
- Coordinates: 2°57′33″N 99°03′47″E
- Elevation: +383.47 m (1,258.1 ft)
- Owner: Kereta Api Indonesia
- Operator: Kereta Api Indonesia
- Line: Tebing Tinggi–Siantar
- Platforms: 1 side platform
- Tracks: 3

Construction
- Structure type: Ground
- Parking: Available
- Accessible: Available

Other information
- Station code: SIR
- Classification: Class II
Location
- Location within Northern Sumatra

Siantar Station is railway station located in Pematangsiantar, North Sumatra, Indonesia. The station is located at an altitude of +383.47 m. Siantar station is the station at the southernmost tip for branches of North Sumatran Main Line, connecting Tebing Tinggi to Pematangsiantar. At the end of this rail is Pertamina fuel depot, separated by a street that ran just above the underground pipes.

Preceding station	Indonesian Railway Company	Following station
Dolok Merangir towards Tebing Tinggi	Tebing Tinggi–Siantar	Terminus
