= Lahat railway station (Malaysia) =

Train station in Lahat, Perak

Lahat

General information
- Other names: Malay: لاهت (Jawi); Chinese: 拿乞; Tamil: லகாட்
- Location: Lahat, Perak, Malaysia
- Operator: Keretapi Tanah Melayu
- Platforms: 1 side platform (small for freight unloading)
- Tracks: 2

Construction
- Structure type: At-grade

Other information
- Status: Freights only

History
- Rebuilt: 2007
- Electrified: 2007

Services
| Preceding station | Keretapi Tanah Melayu | Following station |
|---|---|---|
| Ipoh towards Padang Besar | West Coast Line | Batu Gajah towards Woodlands |

The Lahat railway station is a Malaysian train station on the northeastern side of and named after the town of Lahat, Kinta District, Perak, although prior to the Rawang-Ipoh Electrified Double Tracking project, the station has been converted into a freight yard. People living in Lahat will no longer get passenger services. The nearest passenger station is the Batu Gajah railway station.
