= Prabumulih railway station =

Railway station in Indonesia

Prabumulih Station Stasiun Prabumulih
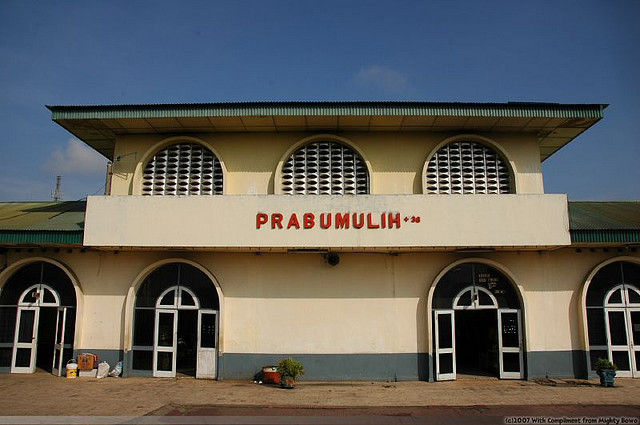
- Prabumulih Station main building seen from the platform, 2007

General information
- Location: Jalan Veteran 1, Pasar Prabumulih, North Prabumulih, Prabumulih, South Sumatra, Indonesia
- Coordinates: 3.433000°S 104.240860°E
- Elevation: +43m
- Owner: Kereta Api Indonesia
- Manager: Kereta Api Indonesia
- Lines: Prabumulih–Kertapati; Lubuklinggau–Prabumulih; Prabumulih–Panjang
- Platforms: 1 side platform 1 island platform
- Tracks: 5

Construction
- Parking: Available
- Accessible: Available

Other information
- Station code: PBM • 6311 • PRABU
- Classification: Large type C

History
- Opened: 1915
- Original company: Zuid-Sumatra Staatsspoorwegen
Location
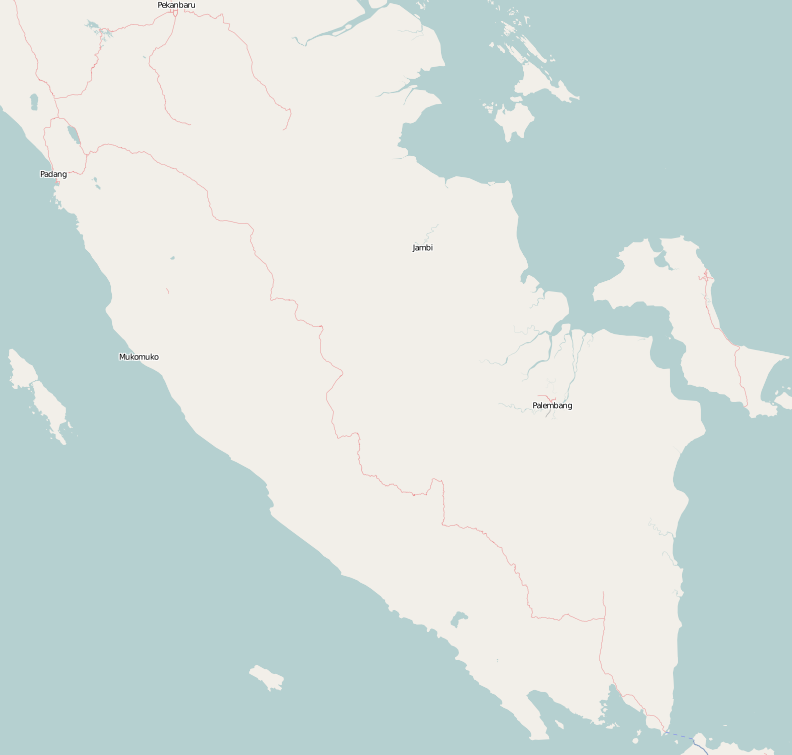
- Location within Southern Sumatra

Prabumulih Station (PBM) is a large type C railway station located in North Prabumulih District, Prabumulih, South Sumatra, Indonesia. The station is located at a railway junction where the line from Kertapati bifurcates, with one going to Lubuklinggau and the other to Tanjung Karang.

== History ==
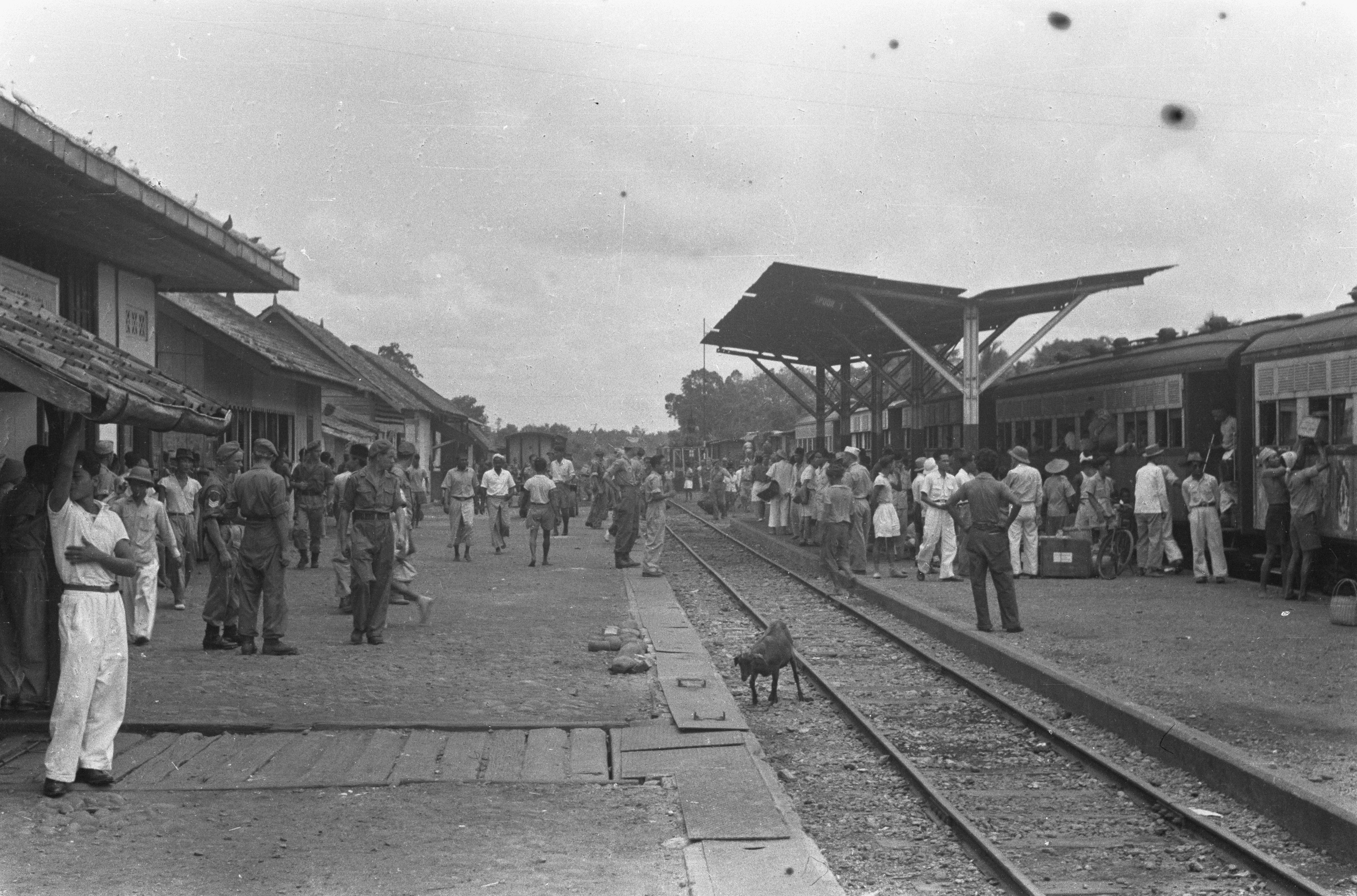
Prabumulih Station in October 1947

Prabumulih Station was opened in 1915 along with the 78 km Prabumulih–Kertapati railway. A new 73 km railway line connecting the station to Muara Enim was opened in 1917. The new and current (as of 2023) station building was constructed in 1982.

== Building and layout ==
Before 1985, the station had nine lines with the line 1 is a straight line. Over time the lines were reduced to only four lines. With the opening of Kertapati–Prabumulih double track on 25 April 2018, the station layout was changed so that the old line 1 became a straight line from and towards Kertapati and Prabumulih Baru X6–Lubuklinggau, while the old line 2 became a straight line towards Prabumulih Baru X5–Tanjung Karang.

With the opening of the aforementioned double track, the station has five lines, with the new line built in the station's platform 1. The layout of the station was changed again so that the new line became the new line 1 as a straight line towards Lubuklinggau, the old line 1 was changed to the new line 2 as a straight line towards Kertapati, and the old line 2 was changed to the new line 3.

To the southeast of the station there is a rail service vehicles depot.

== Services ==
=== Passenger services ===
- Economy class
  - Rajabasa to Tanjung Karang and Kertapati.
  - Serelo to Lubuklinggau and Kertapati.
- Mixed class
  - Sriwijaya to Tanjung Karang and Kertapati.
  - Sindang Marga to Lubuklinggau and Kertapati.

=== Freight ===
- Petroleum to Kertapati, Lubuklinggau, Lahat, and Baturaja.
- Cement from Tigagajah to Kertapati.

Preceding station	Kereta Api Indonesia	Following station
Terminus	Prabumulih–Kertapati	Lembak towards Kertapati
Prabumulih Baru X6 towards Lubuklinggau	Lubuklinggau–Prabumulih	Terminus
Terminus	Prabumulih–Panjang	Prabumulih Baru X5 towards Panjang
