= Lahat Regency =

Regency in South Sumatra, Indonesia

Coordinates: 3°47′11″S 103°32′34″E

Lahat Regency Kabupaten Lahat ꤰꤷꥈꤶꤳꥉꥐ ꤾꥁꤳ꥓ كابوڤاتين لاهت
- Regency
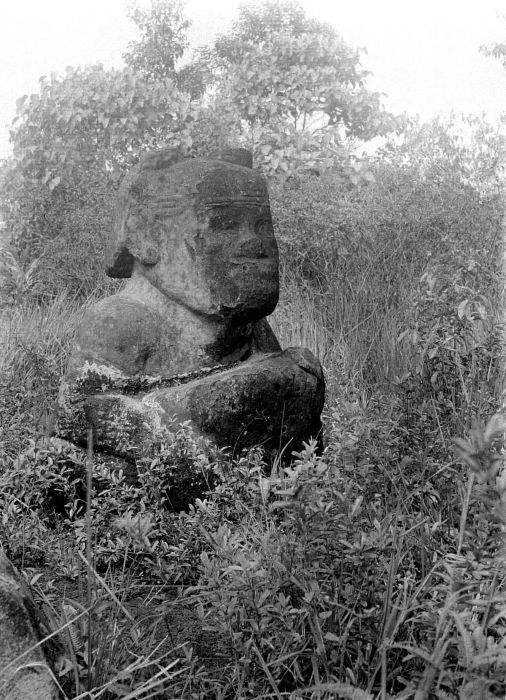
- Megalithic statue located on the way from Pulauping village to Tinggihari village (photo taken in 1933)

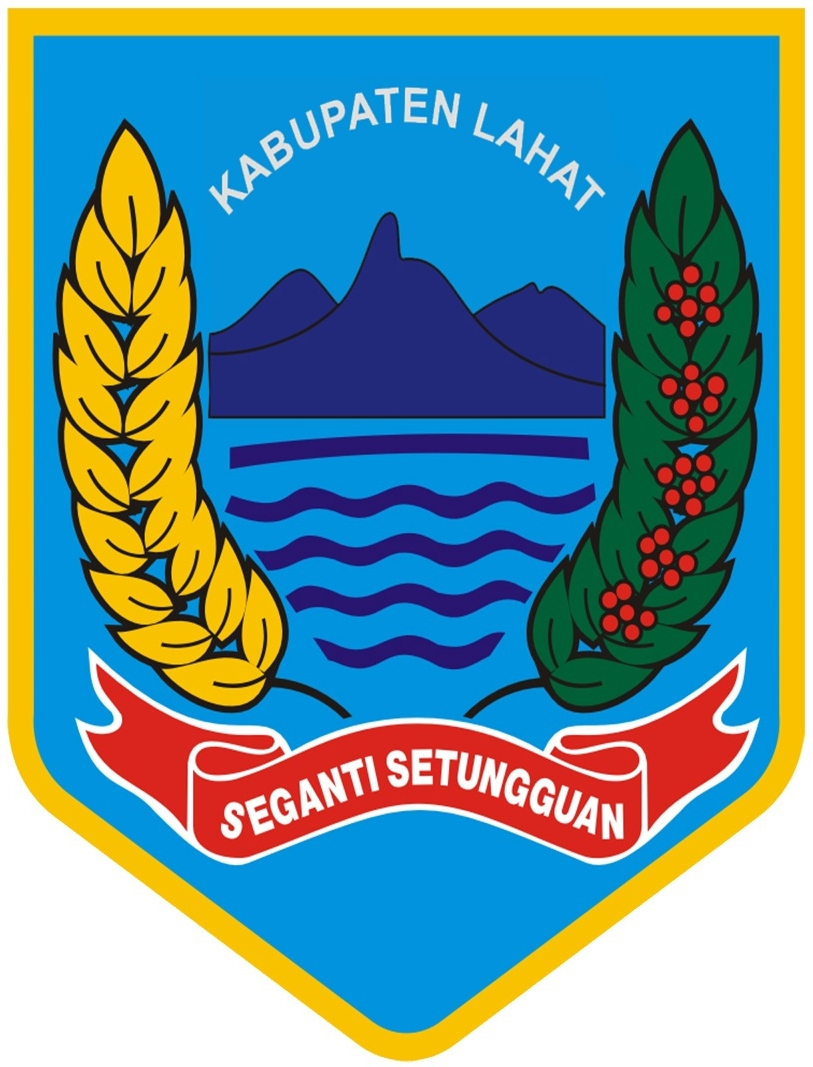
- Coat of arms
- Motto(s): Seganti Setungguan (Ready to take turns and loyal)
- Location in South Sumatra
- Country: Indonesia
- Province: South Sumatra
- Regency seat: Lahat

Government
  - Regent: Bursah Zarnubi
  - Vice Regent: Widia Ningsih

Area
  - Total: 4,361.84 km^{2} (1,684.12 sq mi)

Population (mid 2025 estimate)
  - Total: 453,300
  - Density: 103.9/km^{2} (269.2/sq mi)
- Time zone: UTC+7 (WIB)

Lahat Regency (Indonesian: Kabupaten Lahat; Jawi: كابوڤاتين لاهت; Rejang: ꤰꤷꥈꤶꤳꥉꥐ ꤾꥁꤳ꥓) is a regency of South Sumatra province, Indonesia. It originally included much of the southwestern part of the province, but on 21 June 2001 the town of Pagar Alam was removed from the regency to become an independent city, and on 2 January 2007 the western districts (except Tanjung Sakti Pumi and Tanjung Sakti Pumu) were split off to form the new Empat Lawang Regency. The reduced regency now covers a total area of 4,361.84 km^{2} and had a population of 369,974 at the 2010 Census and 430,071 at the 2020 Census; the official estimate as at mid 2025 was 453,300 (comprising 231,751 males and 221,549 females). The city of Pagar Alam remains an enclave within the regency, but is administratively separate.

The administrative centre of Lahat regency is the town of Lahat.

== Administrative districts ==
This Regency as at 2010 was administratively composed of twenty-one districts (kecamatan). Since 2010 three additional districts have been created - Sukamerindu (from part of Pajar Bulan District), Lahat Selatan (from Lahat District) and Mulak Sebingkai (from Mulak Ulu District). Their areas (in km^{2}) and their populations at the 2010 and 2020 Censuses are listed below, together with the official estimates as at mid 2025. The table also includes the locations of the district administrative centres, the number of administrative villages in each district (totaling 360 rural desa and 18 urban kelurahan - the latter - all but one - in Lahat town District), and its post codes.

Kode Wilayah	Name of District (kecamatan)	Area in km^{2}	Pop'n Census 2010	Pop'n Census 2020	Pop'n Estimate mid 2025	Admin centre	No. of villages	Post code(s)
16.04.01	Tanjung Sakti Pumi ^{(a)}	271.00	15,032	16,820	17,167	Pajar Bulan	18	31581
16.04.24	Tanjung Sakti Pumu ^{(a)}	229.59	13,252	14,520	14,819	Simpang III Pumu	14	31582
16.04.07	Kota Agung	165.59	12,001	13,623	14,586	Kota Agung	22	31462
16.04.15	Mulak Ulu	108.43	16,539	12,572	13,347	Muara Tiga	16	31453
16.04.27	Tanjung Tebat	82.72	7,734	8,820	9,077	Tanjung Tebat	14	31455
16.04.30	Mulak Sebingkai	63.41	^{(b)}	5,706	5,917	Keban Agung	10	31454
16.04.08	Pulau Pinang (Pinang Island)	111.67	10,994	9,867	10,635	Jati	10	31463
16.04.22	Pagar Guning	105.51	11,568	12,949	13,225	Karang Agung	20	31460
16.04.25	Gumay Ulu	87.01	4,993	5,583	6,167	Tinggi Hari	10	31461
16.04.06	Jarai	167.52	19,231	20,512	21,023	Jarai	21	31591
16.04.12	Pajar Bulan	146.11	18,938	12,853	13,152	Sumur	20	31356
16.04.28	Muara Payang	37.50	8,340	8,904	8,703	Lawang Agung Lama	7	31390
16.04.29	Sukamerindu	55.23	^{(c)}	8,046	8,147	Sukamerindu	10	31350
16.04.19	Kikim Barat (West Kikim)	272.00	14,699	17,898	18,846	Saung Naga	19	31452
16.04.17	Kikim Timur (East Kikim)	564.45	26,014	31,994	33,535	Bungamas	32	31458
16.04.16	Kikim Selatan (South Kikim)	124.80	14,813	17,340	18,182	Pagar Jati	18	31451
16.04.18	Kikim Tengah (Central Kikim)	265.60	8,193	10,046	10,652	Tanjung Aur	9	31459
16.04.10	Lahat (district)	107.60	102,356	107,506	112,422	Lahat	30 ^{(d)}	31411 - 31419
16.04.21	Gumay Talang	249.61	9,804	12,938	13,919	Sukarame	15	31419
16.04.20	Pseksu	269.29	7,949	9,042	9,392	Lubuk Mabar	11	31417 - 31419
16.04.31	Lahat Selatan (South Lahat)	183.87	^{(e)}	13,208	15,792	Tanjung Payang	10	31420 - 31429
16.04.09	Merapi Barat (West Merapi)	232.64	19,783	25,703	29,373	Merapi	19	31471
16.04.23	Merapi Timur (East Merapi)	260.66	20,413	25,232	26,058	Lebuay Bandung	14 ^{(f)}	31473
16.04.26	Merapi Selatan (South Merapi)	200.14	7,328	8,389	9,164	Sukamerindu	9	31472
	Totals	4,361.84	369,974	430,071	453,300	Lahat (town)	378	

Notes: (a) The southwestern districts of Tanjung Sakti Pumu and Tanjung Sakti Pumi form nearly an exclave of the regency, from which they are physically almost completely separated by the city (kota) of Pagar Alam.
(b) The 2010 population of Mulak Sebingkai District is included in the figure for Mulak Ulu District from which it was cut out.
(c) The 2010 population of Sukamerindu District is included in the figure for Pajar Bulan District, from which it was cut out.
(d) comprising 17 kelurahan (Bandar Agung, Bandar Jaya, Gunung Gajah, Kota Baru, Kota Jaya, Kota Negara, Lahat Tengah, Pagar Agung, Pasar Baru, Pasar Bawah, Pasar Lama, Raden PJKA (pembangunan jalur kereta api), Raden PJKA Bandar Agung, Sari Bunga Mas, Talang Jawa, Talang Jawa Selatan and Talang Jawa Utara) and 13 desa.
(e) The 2010 population of Lahat Selatan District is included in the figure for Lahat District, from which it was cut out.
(f) including one kelurahan - the town of Lebuay Bandung.

== Megalithic sites ==
In Lahat Regency, near Pagar Alam city, there are 1,027 artifacts which spread over 40 sites in 12 communities. The megalithic sites in Lahat Regency may be the second largest such sites in Indonesia after Sangiran (Central Java) for fossils.
