= Lubuklinggau railway station =

Railway station in Indonesia

Lubuklinggau Station Stasiun Lubuklinggau
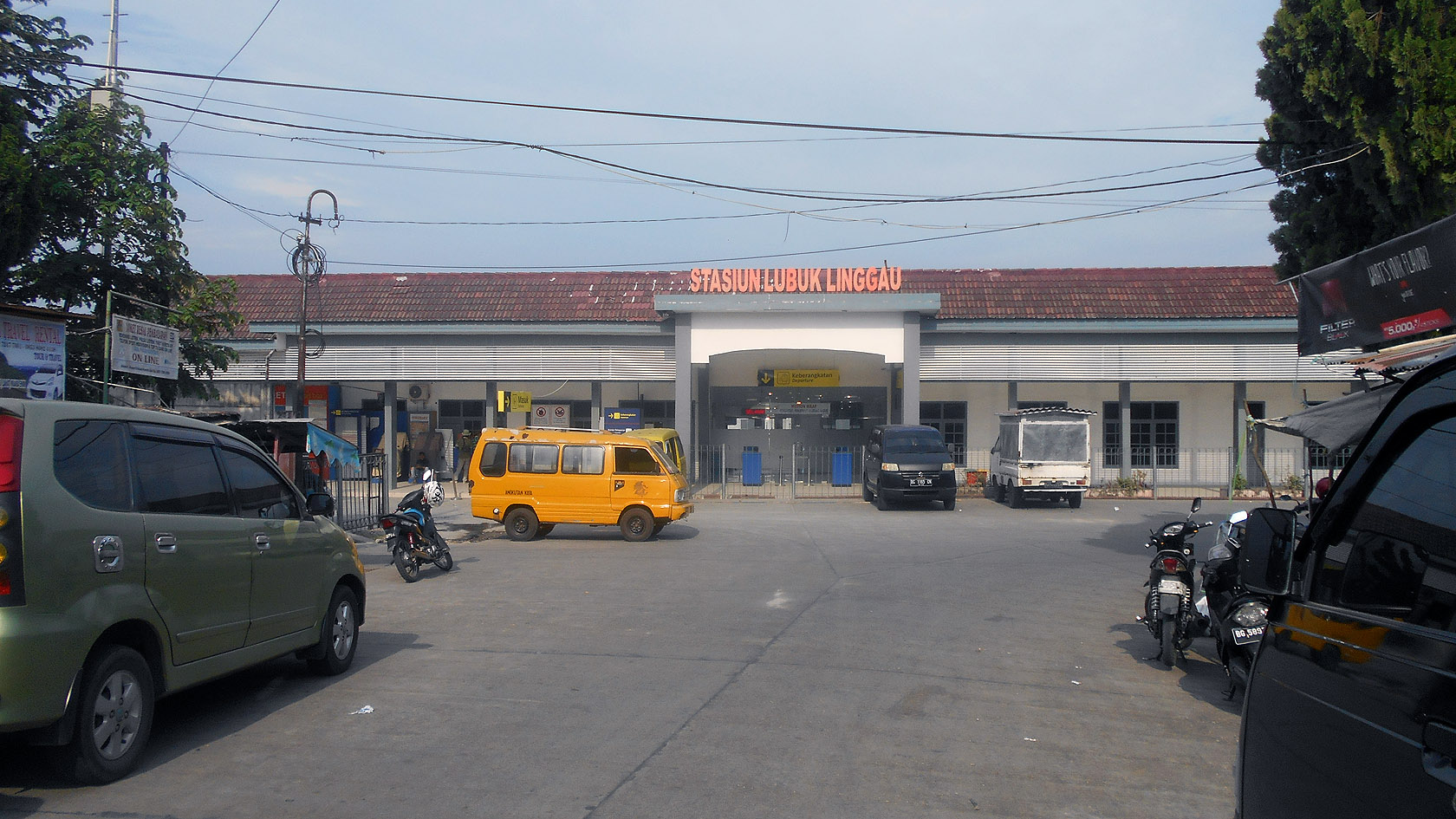
- Lubuklinggau Station in 2018

General information
- Location: Jalan Kalimantan, Pasar Permiri, Lubuklinggau Barat II, Lubuklinggau, South Sumatra, Indonesia
- Coordinates: 3.293434°S 102.864223°E
- Elevation: +130m
- Owner: Kereta Api Indonesia
- Manager: Kereta Api Indonesia
- Line: Lubuklinggau–Prabumulih
- Platforms: 1 side platform 1 island platform
- Tracks: 4

Other information
- Station code: LLG • 6001
- Classification: Class I

History
- Opened: 1 June 1933
- Original company: Zuid-Sumatra Staatsspoorwegen
Location
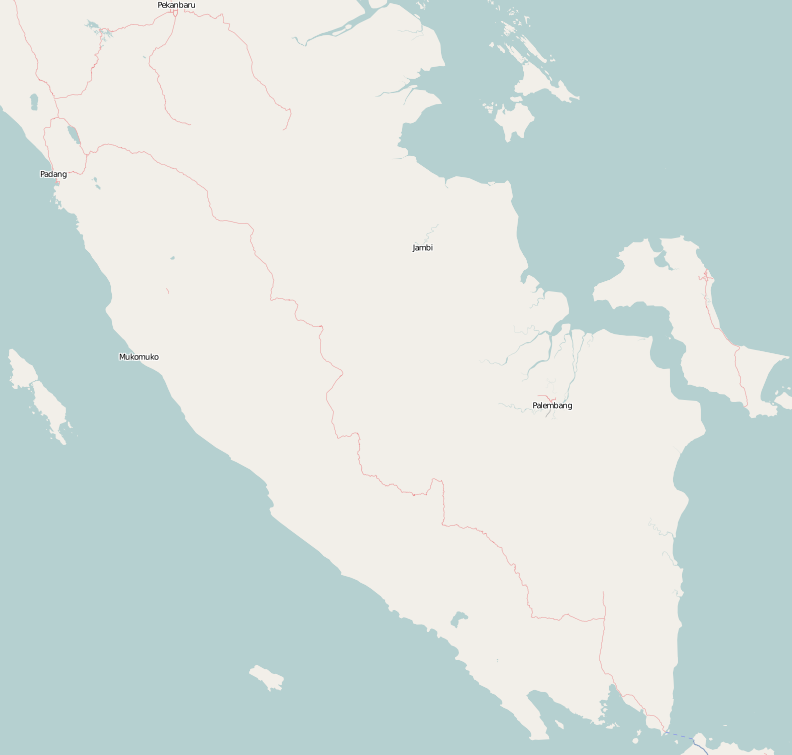
- Location within Southern Sumatra

Lubuklinggau Station (LLG) is a class I railway station located in Lubuklinggau Barat II District, Lubuklinggau, South Sumatra, Indonesia. Located at an altitude of +130 meters, it is the northernmost and westernmost railway station in South Sumatra province. The station serves the city of Lubuklinggau and is the only railway station in the city.

== History ==
At the start of the 1930s, the state-owned railway company Zuid-Sumatra Staatsspoorwegen was constructing a new railway line connecting Muara Enim to Lahat with terminus at Lubuklinggau, which was finished by mid-1933. Lubuklinggau Station and the line itself were opened on 1 June 1933.

== Building and layout ==
The station has four railway lines, with line 2 being a straight line. Line 1 is connected to a dead-end track which goes to the train crew administration office south of the station's main building. To the east of the station is a locomotive shed. The railway tracks continued to a Pertamina oil depot north of the station.

== Services ==
=== Passenger services ===
- Economy class
  - Serelo to Kertapati
- Mixed class
  - Sindang Marga to Kertapati

=== Freight ===
- Petroleum to Kertapati

Preceding station	Kereta Api Indonesia	Following station
Terminus	Lubuklinggau–Prabumulih	Kota Padang towards Prabumulih
