= Tanjung Karang railway station =

Railway station in Indonesia

Tanjung Karang Station Stasiun Tanjung Karang
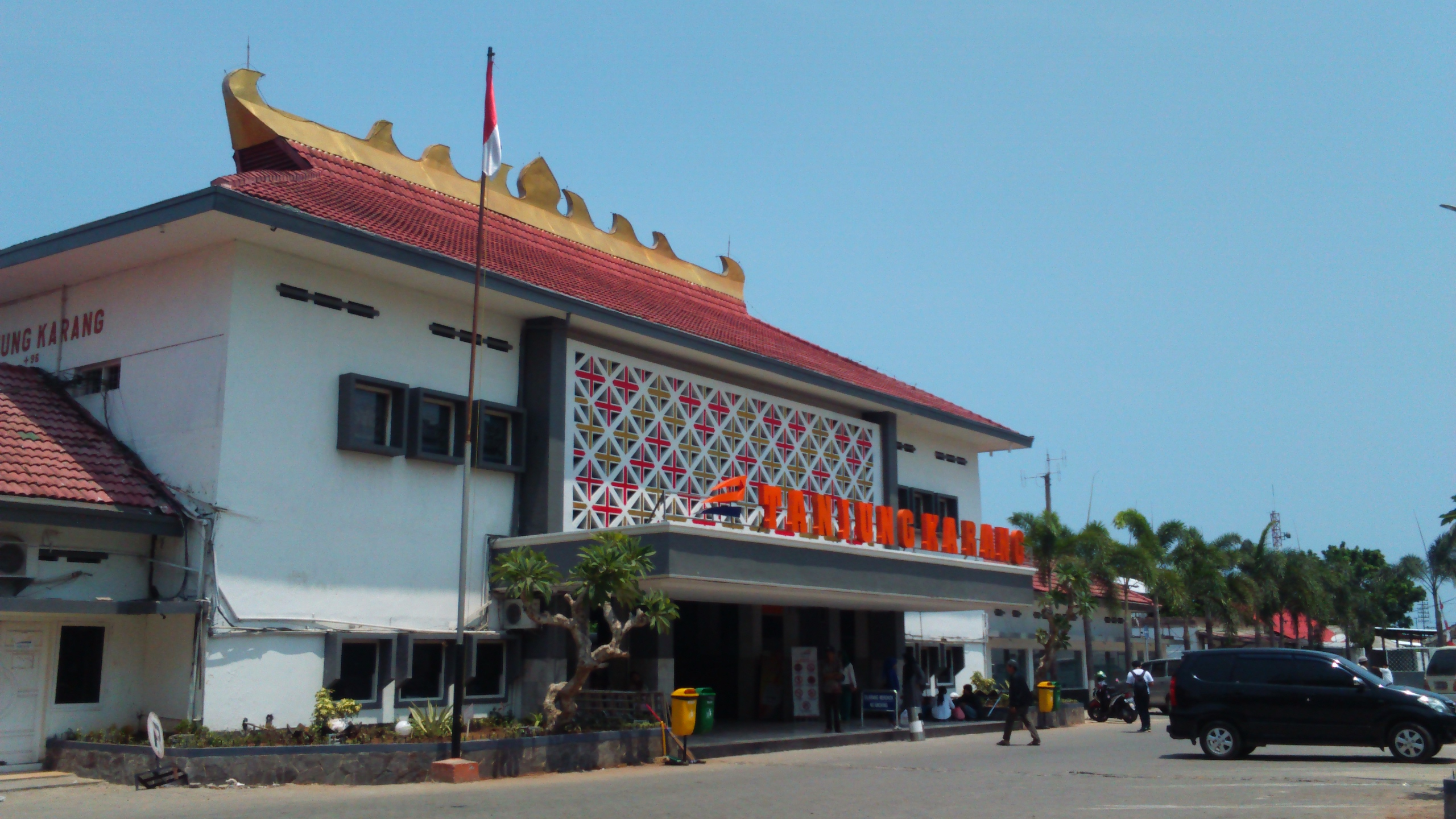
- Tanjung Karang Station in 2015

General information
- Location: Jalan Kotaraja No. 1, Gunung Sari, Enggal, Bandar Lampung, Lampung, Indonesia
- Coordinates: 5.4088642°S 105.2599558°E
- Elevation: 96 m (315 ft)
- Owner: Kereta Api Indonesia
- Manager: Kereta Api Indonesia
- Line: Prabumulih–Tanjung Karang–Panjang
- Platforms: one side platform and three island platform
- Tracks: 5

Construction
- Structure type: Ground
- Parking: Available

Other information
- Station code: TNK • 6910
- Classification: Large type A

History
- Opened: 3 August 1914
- Original company: Zuid-Sumatra Staatsspoorwegen
Location
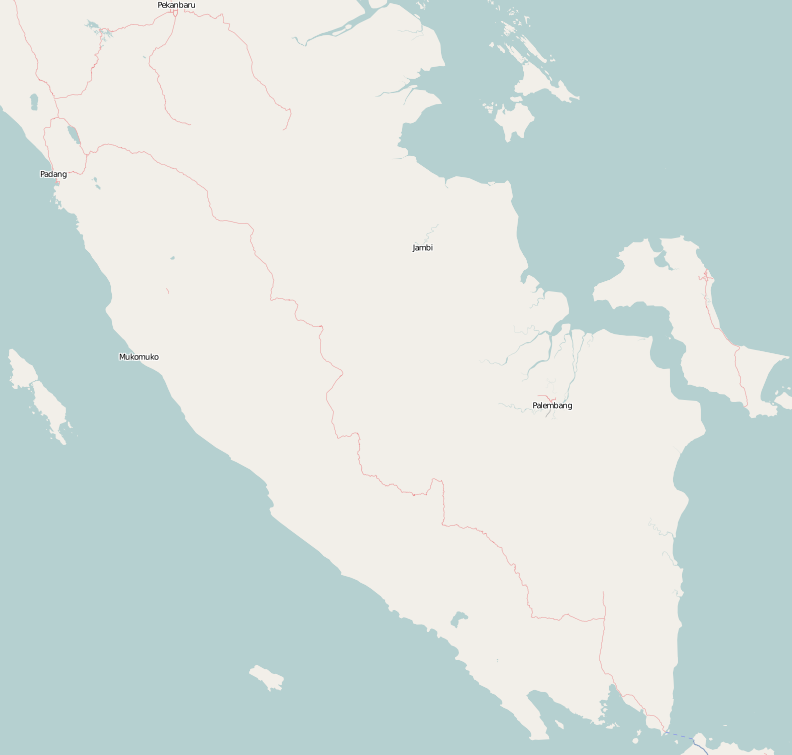
- Location within Southern Sumatra

Tanjung Karang Station (TNK) (alternatively Tanjungkarang Station) is a large type A railway station located in Enggal District, Bandar Lampung, Lampung, Indonesia. The station is located at an altitude of 96 metres (315 feet) and is operated by the Regional Division IV Tanjungkarang of Kereta Api Indonesia. The station served as starting point for passenger trains heading for Kertapati Station in Palembang.

== Services ==
The following is a list of train services at the Tanjung Karang Station

=== Passenger services ===
- Economy class
  - Kuala Stabas to Baturaja
  - Rajabasa to Kertapati
- Mixed class
  - Sriwijaya to Kertapati

=== Freight ===
- Coal to Tarahan and Tanjung Enim Baru

== Supporting transportation ==
Type	Route	Destination
Angkot Bandar Lampung	Sky Blue line	Tanjungkarang–Rajabasa
Angkot Bandar Lampung	Beige line	Tanjungkarang–Way Halim
Angkot Bandar Lampung	Red line	Tanjungkarang–Kemiling
Angkot Bandar Lampung	Red-Blue line	Tanjungkarang–Sam Ratulangi
Angkot Bandar Lampung	Grey line	Tanjungkarang–Sukarame
Angkot Bandar Lampung	Grey-Blue line	Tanjungkarang–Permata Biru
Angkot Bandar Lampung	White-Green line	Tanjungkarang–Ir. Sutami
Angkot Bandar Lampung	Green line	Tanjungkarang–Garuntang
Angkot Bandar Lampung	Purple line	Tanjungkarang–Teluk Betung
Trans Bandar Lampung
Trans Bandar Lampung		Rajabasa-Panjang
DAMRI intercity bus		Tanjungkarang–Jakarta (Gambir Station)
DAMRI intercity bus		Tanjungkarang–Jakarta (Kemayoran)
DAMRI intercity bus		Tanjungkarang–Bandung
DAMRI intercity bus		Tanjungkarang–Bogor
DAMRI intercity bus		Tanjungkarang–Bekasi

Preceding station	Kereta Api Indonesia	Following station
Labuhan Ratu towards Prabumulih	Prabumulih–Panjang	Garuntang towards Panjang
