= Kertapati railway station =

Railway station in Indonesia

Kertapati Station Stasiun Kertapati
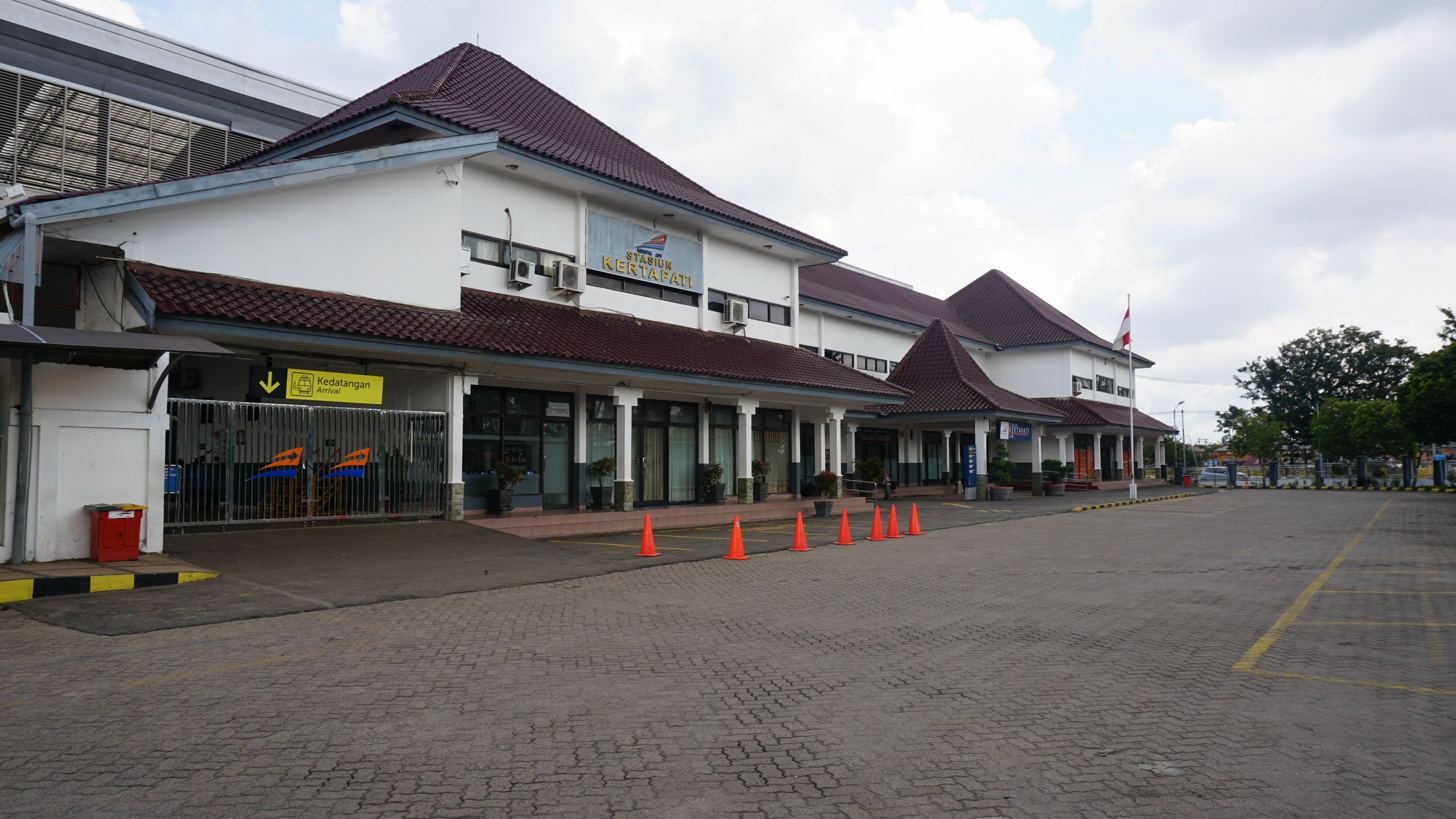
- Kertapati Station, as of 2019

General information
- Location: Jalan Ki Merogan, Kemas Rindo, Kertapati, Palembang; South Sumatra; Indonesia
- Coordinates: 3.016533°S 104.751602°E
- Elevation: +2 m (6.6 ft)
- Owner: Kereta Api Indonesia
- Operator: Kereta Api Indonesia
- Line: Prabumulih–Kertapati
- Platforms: 1 side platform 2 island platforms
- Tracks: 14
- Connections: Kertapati; Kertapati

Construction
- Structure type: Ground
- Parking: Available
- Accessible: Available

Other information
- Station code: KPT
- Classification: Large class type A

History
- Opened: 1 November 1915

Services
Preceding station	Kertalaya railbus	Following station
Terminus	Kertapati–Indralaya	Indralaya; Terminus
Location
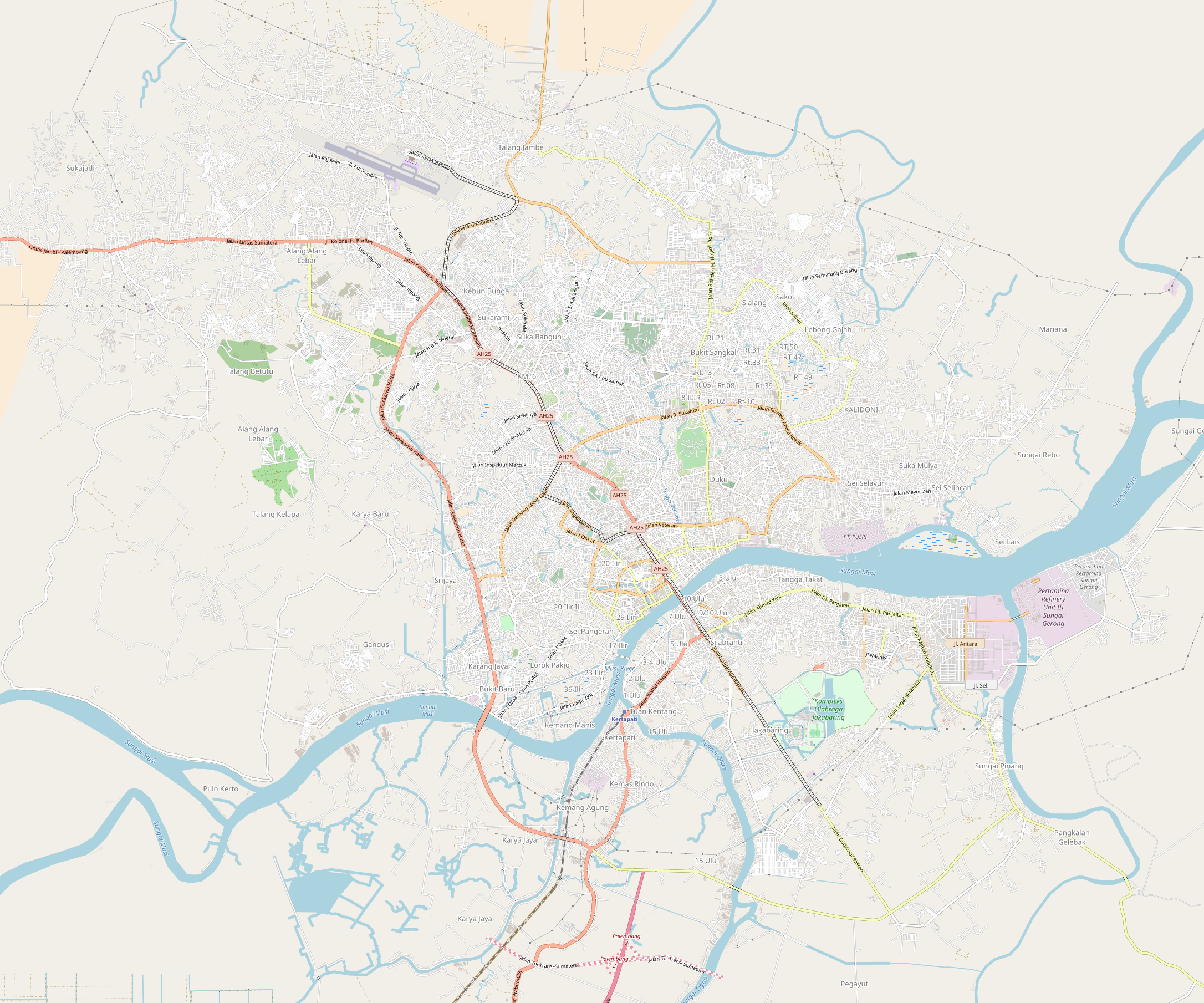
- Location within Palembang

Kertapati Station (KPT) is a railway station located in Kemas Rindo, Kertapati, Palembang, South Sumatra, Indonesia. It is operated by the Regional Division III Palembang of Kereta Api Indonesia, and has become the main station of the city. The station is close to the Musi River and Ogan River.

== Services ==
The following is a list of train services at the Kertapati Station:

=== Passenger services ===
- Commuter
  - Kertalaya to Indralaya
- Economy class
  - Serelo to Lubuklinggau
  - Rajabasa to Tanjung Karang
- Mixed class
  - Sindang Marga to Lubuklinggau
  - Sriwijaya to Tanjung Karang

=== Freight ===
- Coal to Sukacinta
- Petroleum to Lubuklinggau, Lahat and Tigagajah

Preceding station	Kereta Api Indonesia	Following station
Kramasan towards Prabumulih	Prabumulih–Kertapati	Terminus
