= Sicincin railway station =

Railway station in Indonesia

Sicincin Station Stasiun Sicincin
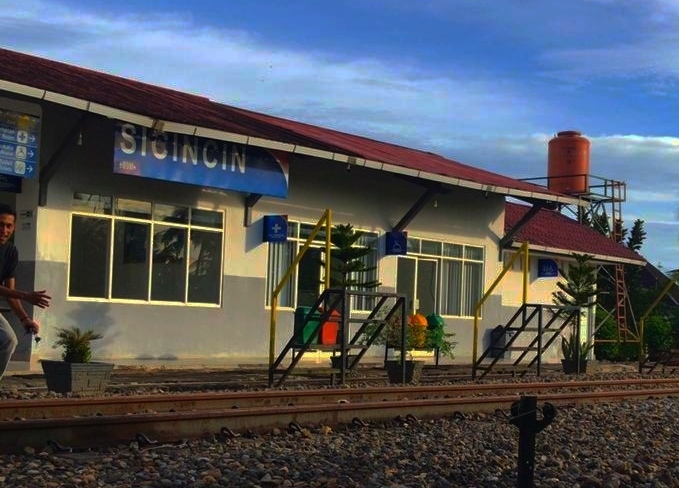

General information
- Location: Sicincin, 2x11 Enam Lingkung, Padang Pariaman Regency; West Sumatra; Indonesia
- Coordinates: 0.566175°S 100.277973°E
- Elevation: +89 m (292 ft)
- Owner: Kereta Api Indonesia
- Operator: Kereta Api Indonesia
- Line: Pulau Aie–Padang Panjang
- Platforms: 1 island platform 1 side platform
- Tracks: 3

Construction
- Structure type: Ground
- Accessible: Available

Other information
- Station code: SCN
- Classification: Class III

History
- Former names: Sitjintjin Station
Location
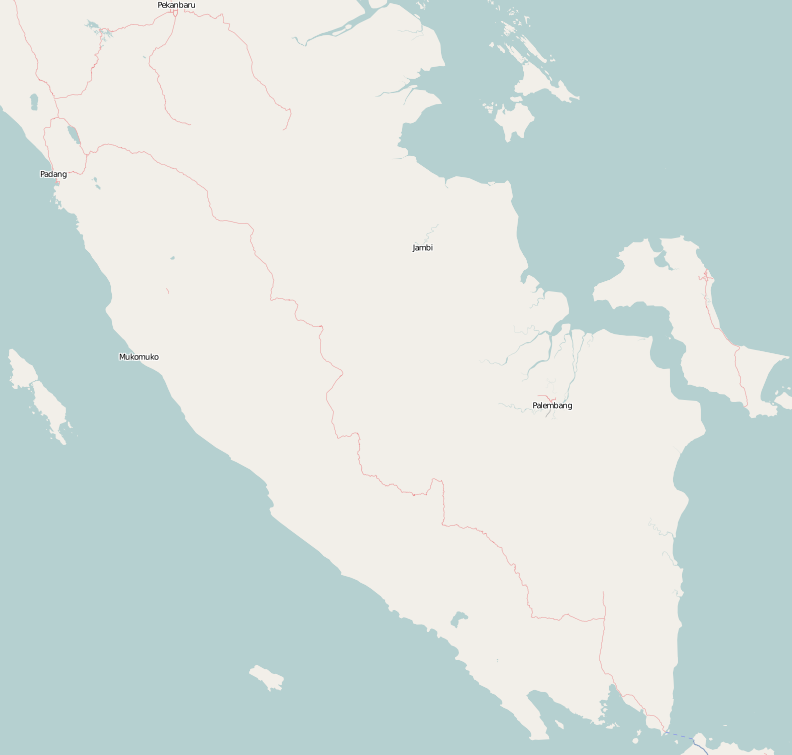
- Location within Southern Sumatra

Sicincin Station (SCN, formerly Sitjintjin Station) is a railway station located in Sicincin, 2x11 Enam Lingkung, Padang Pariaman Regency. The station, which is located at an altitude of +89 m, is part of the Regional Division II West Sumatra.

To support railbus transportation that runs on the Lubuk Alung–Kayu Tanam railway segment, this station, along with the Kayu Tanam Station, have undergone a complete overhaul.

Only one train service stops at this station, namely the Lembah Anai railbus, which travels to Kayu Tanam and Lubuk Alung, and it was inaugurated on 1 November 2016. Starting from 6 March 2019, the railbus was extended to Minangkabau International Airport.

== Services ==
There is only one passenger train journey, namely Lembah Anai railbus towards Kayu Tanam and towards Minangkabau.

Preceding station	Kereta Api Indonesia	Following station
Parit Malintang towards Pulau Aie	Pulau Aie–Padang Panjang	Kayu Tanam towards Padang Panjang
