= Lubuk Buaya railway station =

Railway station in Padang, Indonesia

Lubuk Buaya Station Stasiun Lubuk Buaya
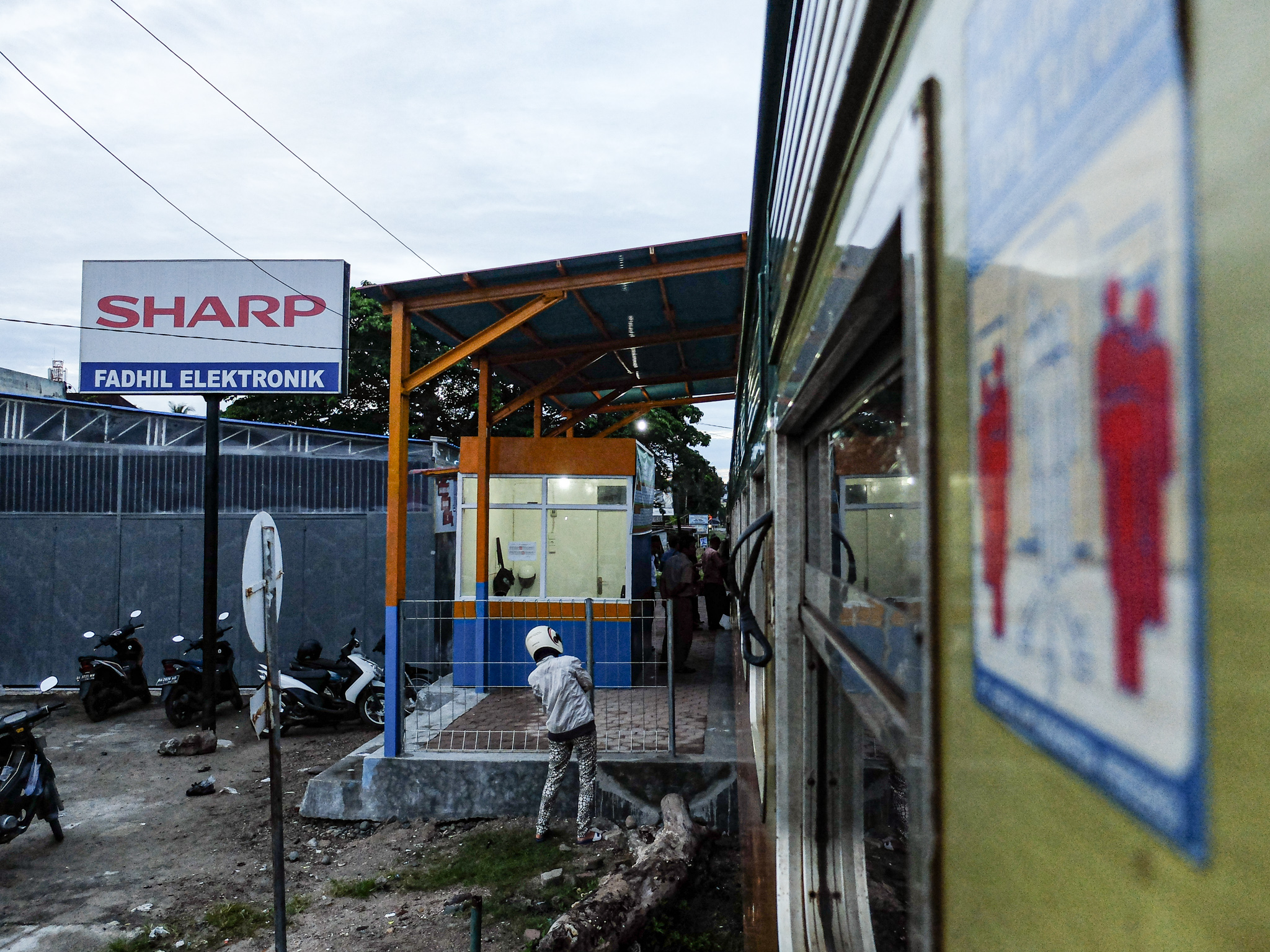
- Sibinuang stopping at Lubuk Buaya Station.

General information
- Location: Lubuk Buaya, Padang; West Sumatra; Indonesia
- Coordinates: 0°50′01″S 100°19′40″E
- Elevation: +2 m (6.6 ft)
- Owner: Kereta Api Indonesia
- Operator: Kereta Api Indonesia
- Line: Pulau Aie–Padang Panjang
- Platforms: 1 side platform
- Tracks: 1
- Train operators: Kereta Api Indonesia

Construction
- Structure type: Ground
- Accessible: Available

Other information
- Status: Active
- Station code: LBY • 7025

Services
Preceding station	Kereta Api Indonesia	Following station
Tabing towards Pauh Lima	Sibinuang	Duku towards Naras
Location
- Location within West Sumatra
- Interactive map

Lubuk Buaya Station (LBY) is a railway station located in Lubuk Buaya, Koto Tangah, Padang, West Sumatra. The station, which is located at an altitude of +2 m, is part of the Regional Division II West Sumatra of Kereta Api Indonesia. This station serves passenger trains on the Sibinuang.

It serves as a suburban stop on the Sibinuang, connecting Pauh Lima and Pariaman.

== History ==
The original line through Lubuk Buaya dates back to the colonial period as part of the West Sumatra railway network. The station was rebuilt and reopened in 2017 in conjunction with the construction of the Minangkabau Airport Rail Link, intended to provide commuter access between Padang city center, Pariaman, and Minangkabau International Airport.

== Services ==
Train	Operator	Route
S Sibinuang	Kereta Api Indonesia Divre II	Pauh Lima – Pariaman

Preceding station	Kereta Api Indonesia	Following station
Tabing towards Pulau Aie	Pulau Aie–Padang Panjang	Duku towards Padang Panjang
