= Duku railway station =

Railway station in Indonesia

Duku Station Stasiun Duku
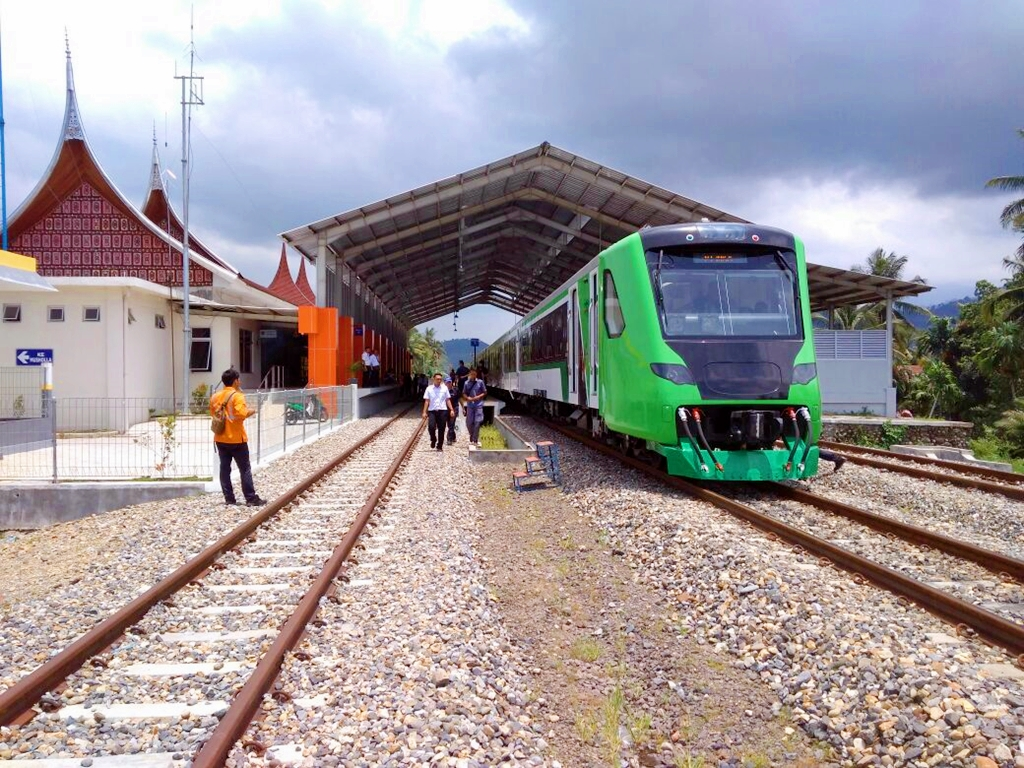
- Minangkabau Airport Rail Link arrived Duku Station.

General information
- Location: Jl. Raya Padang-Bukittinggi, Kasang, Batang Anai, Padang Pariaman Regency; West Sumatra; Indonesia
- Coordinates: 0.786944°S 100.317°E
- Elevation: +7 m (23 ft)
- Owner: Kereta Api Indonesia
- Operator: Kereta Api Indonesia
- Lines: Minangkabau Express; L Lembah Anai Railbus; S Sibinuang
- Platforms: 1 island platform 2 side platforms
- Tracks: 3

Construction
- Structure type: Ground
- Parking: Available
- Accessible: Available
- Architectural style: Rumah Gadang

Other information
- Station code: DUK • 7027
- Classification: Class II

History
- Rebuilt: 2015–2017

Services
| Preceding station | Kereta Api Indonesia | Following station |
|---|---|---|
| Lubuk Buaya towards Pauh Lima | Sibinuang | Lubuk Alung towards Naras |
| Tabing towards Pulau Aie | Minangkabau Airport Rail Link | Minangkabau International Airport Terminus |
Location
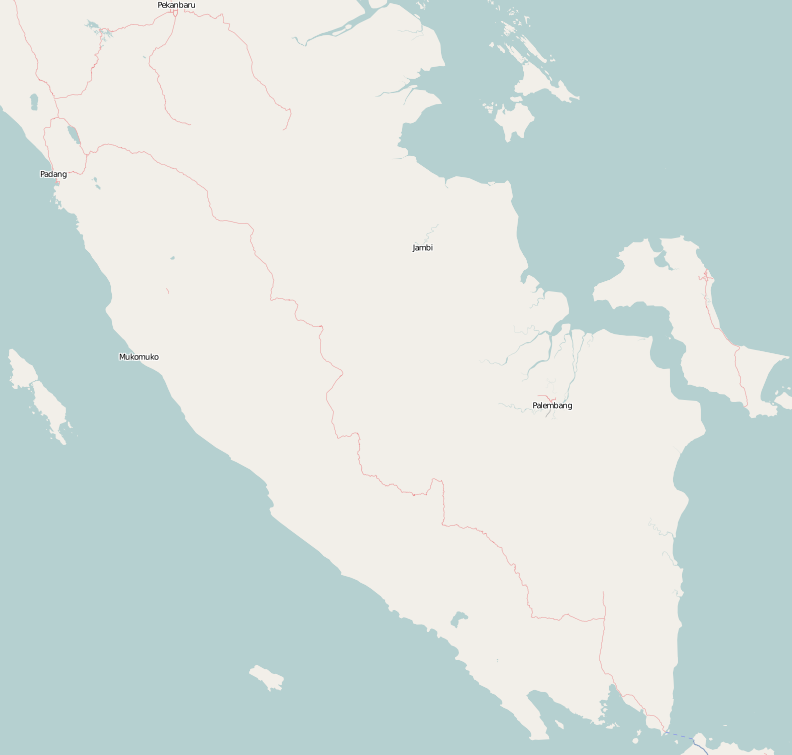
- Location within Southern Sumatra

Duku Station (DUK) is a railway station located in Kasang, Batang Anai, Padang Pariaman Regency, West Sumatra. The station, which is located at an altitude of +7m, is included in the Regional Division II West Sumatra. To the northeast from line 1 of this station there is a new branch to Minangkabau International Airport which has been operating since 2018.

The station building has now been replaced with a new building with a typical Minangkabau Rumah Gadang architecture. The old station building which is an Staatsspoorwegen ter Sumatra's Westkust heritage has now been torn down.

This line is served by train from the airport to Padang Station, which is 23 km from the airport. Starting 22 March 2019 the Lembah Anai rail bus also stopped at this station in connection with the extension of this railway link to the airport and this station automatically became the station with the busiest rail traffic in West Sumatra.

== Building and layout ==
This station has three railway lines with line 2 being a straight line towards Padang and Lubuk Alung. To the northeast of line 1 of this station there is a new branch to Minangkabau International Airport along 3 km which has been operating since 2018.

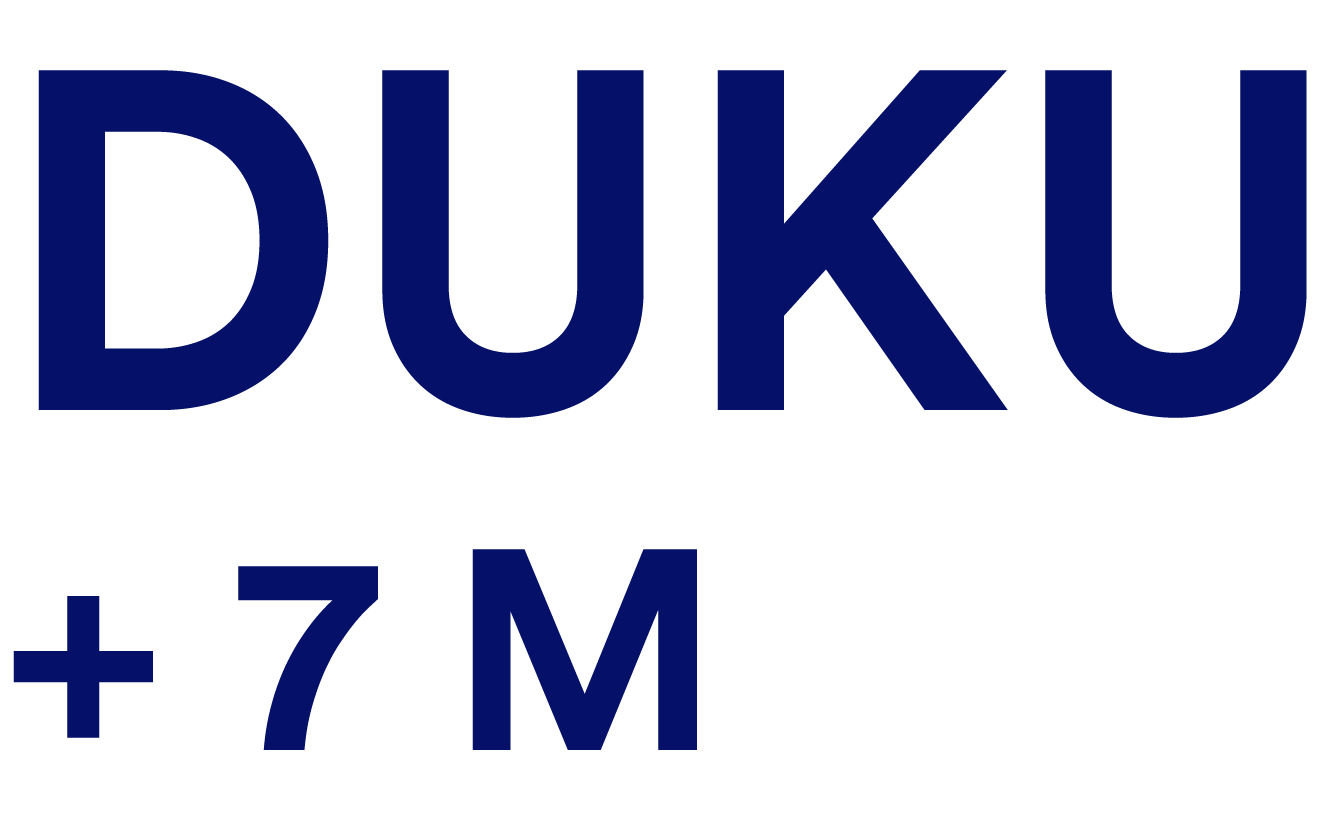
Side platform
| Line 3 | ← (Lubuk Alung) | S Sibinuang to Naras and Padang-Pauh Lima | (Lubuk Buaya) → |
| Line 2 | ← (Minangkabau International Airport/Lubuk Alung) | L Lembah Anai Railbus to Minangkabau International Airport and Kayu Tanam |
| Line 2 | ← (Lubuk Alung) | S Sibinuang to Naras and Padang-Pauh Lima | (Lubuk Buaya) → |
Island platform
| Line 1 | ← (Minangkabau International Airport) | ← Minangkabau Express to Minangkabau International Airport and Pulau Aie | (Tabing) |
Side platform
Main building

== Services ==
The following is a list of train services at the Duku Station.

=== Passenger services ===
- Sibinuang, to Padang and Naras
- Lembah Anai railbus, to Kayu Tanam and Minangkabau International Airport
- Minangkabau Airport Rail Link, to Pulau Aie and Minangkabau International Airport

| Preceding station | Kereta Api Indonesia | Following station |
|---|---|---|
| Lubuk Buaya towards Pulau Aie | Pulau Aie–Padang Panjang | Pasarusang towards Padang Panjang |
| Terminus | Minangkabau Int'l Airport–Duku | Minangkabau International Airport Terminus |
