= Pariaman railway station =

Railway station in Indonesia

Pariaman Station Stasiun Pariaman
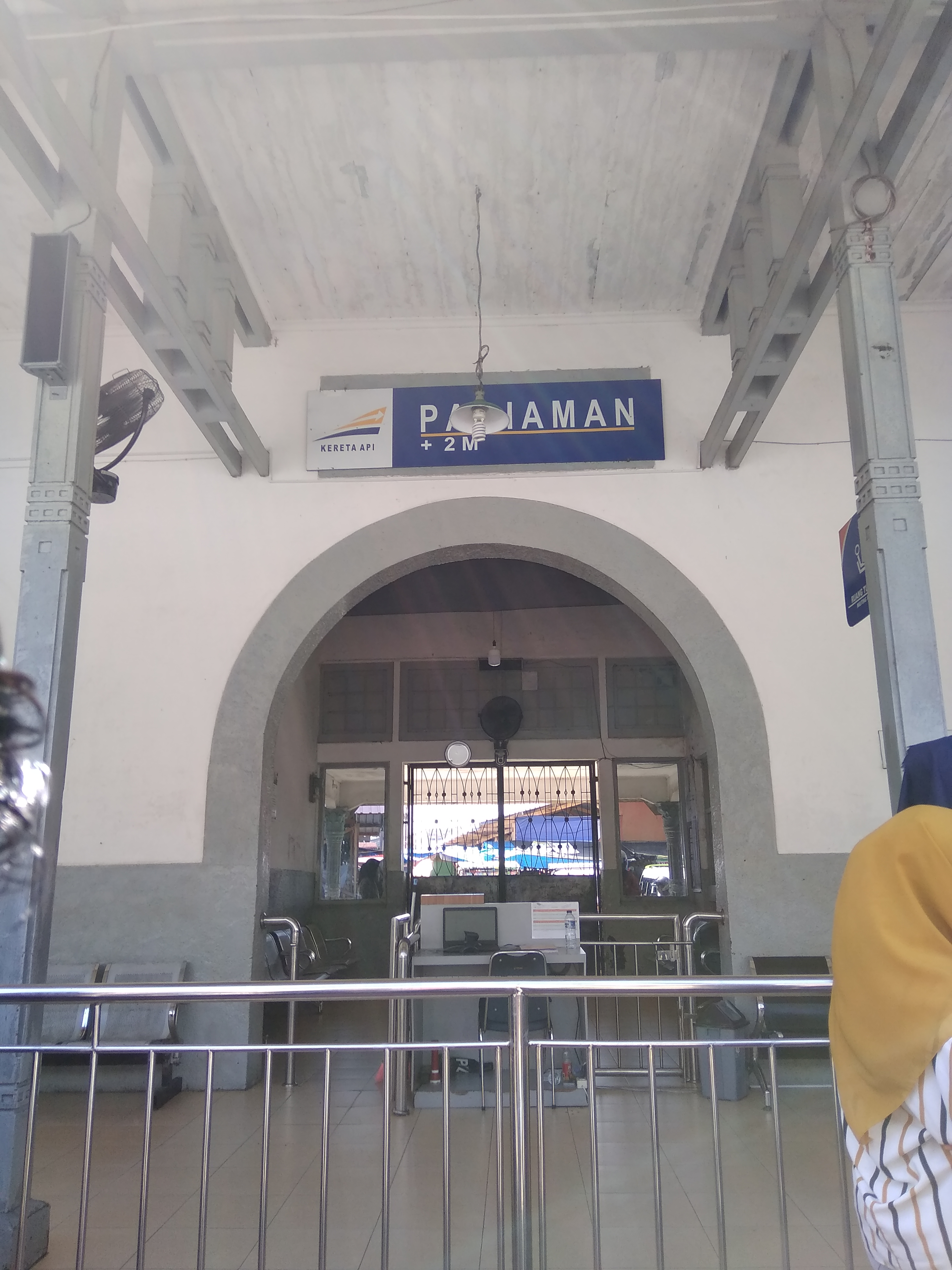
- Pariaman Station, taken by 4 July 2019.

General information
- Location: Jl. Pangeran Diponegoro, Kampung Pondok I, Central Pariaman, Pariaman; West Sumatra; Indonesia
- Coordinates: 0.6266499999999999°S 100.1165128°E
- Elevation: +2 m (6.6 ft)
- Owner: Kereta Api Indonesia
- Operator: Kereta Api Indonesia
- Lines: Lubuk Alung–Naras; S Sibinuang
- Platforms: 1 side platform double island platforms
- Tracks: 3

Construction
- Structure type: Ground
- Parking: Unavailable
- Accessible: Available

Other information
- Station code: PMN • 7103
- Classification: Class II

History
- Opened: 1908
- Former names: Priaman Station
Location
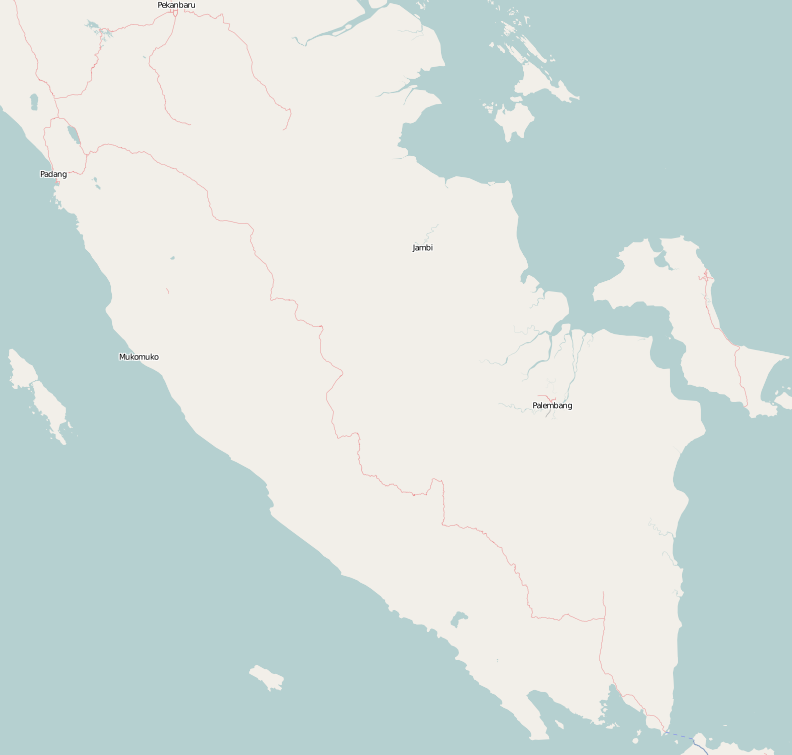
- Location within Southern Sumatra

Pariaman Station (PMN) is a railway station located in Kampung Pondok I, Central Pariaman, Pariaman, West Sumatra, Indonesia. The station, which is located at an altitude of +2 meters, is included in the Regional Division II West Sumatra. The station is located only 20 metres from the beach.

== Station layout ==
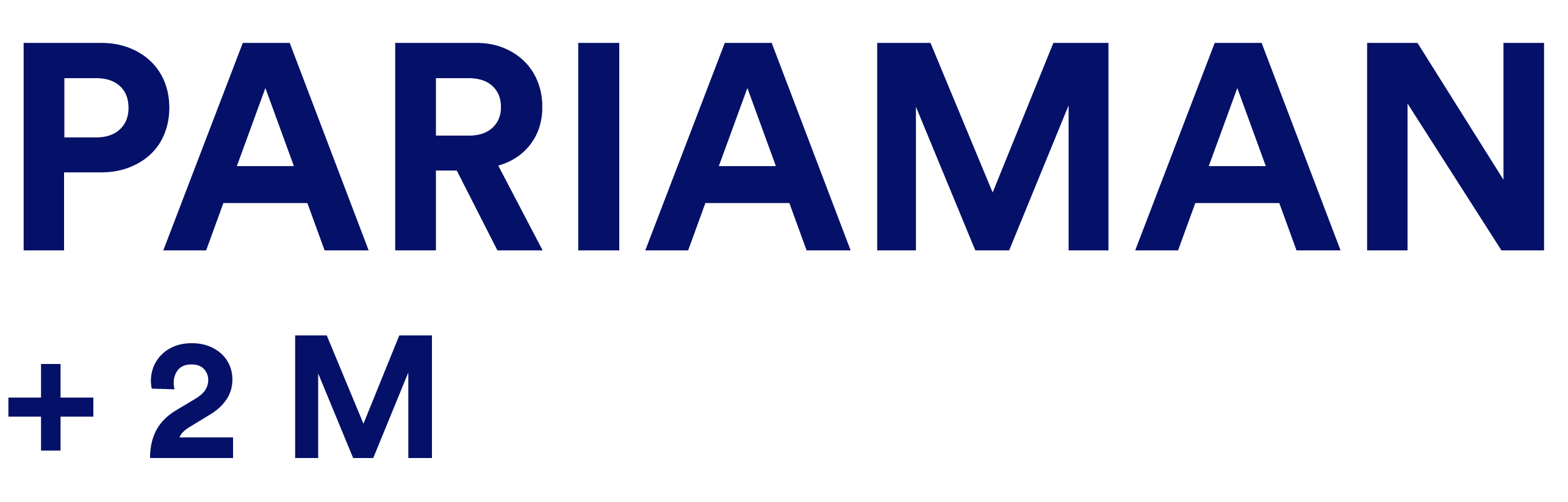
Main building
Side platform
Line 1		Straight tracks
Island platform
Line 2	← (Naras)	S Sibinuang to Naras and Padang-Pauh Lima	(Kurai Taji) →

== Services ==
There is only one passenger train journey, namely Sibinuang towards Padang and towards Naras.

Preceding station	Kereta Api Indonesia	Following station
Kurai Taji towards Lubuk Alung	Lubuk Alung–Naras	Naras; Terminus
