= Padang railway station =

Railway station in Indonesia

Padang Station Stasiun Padang
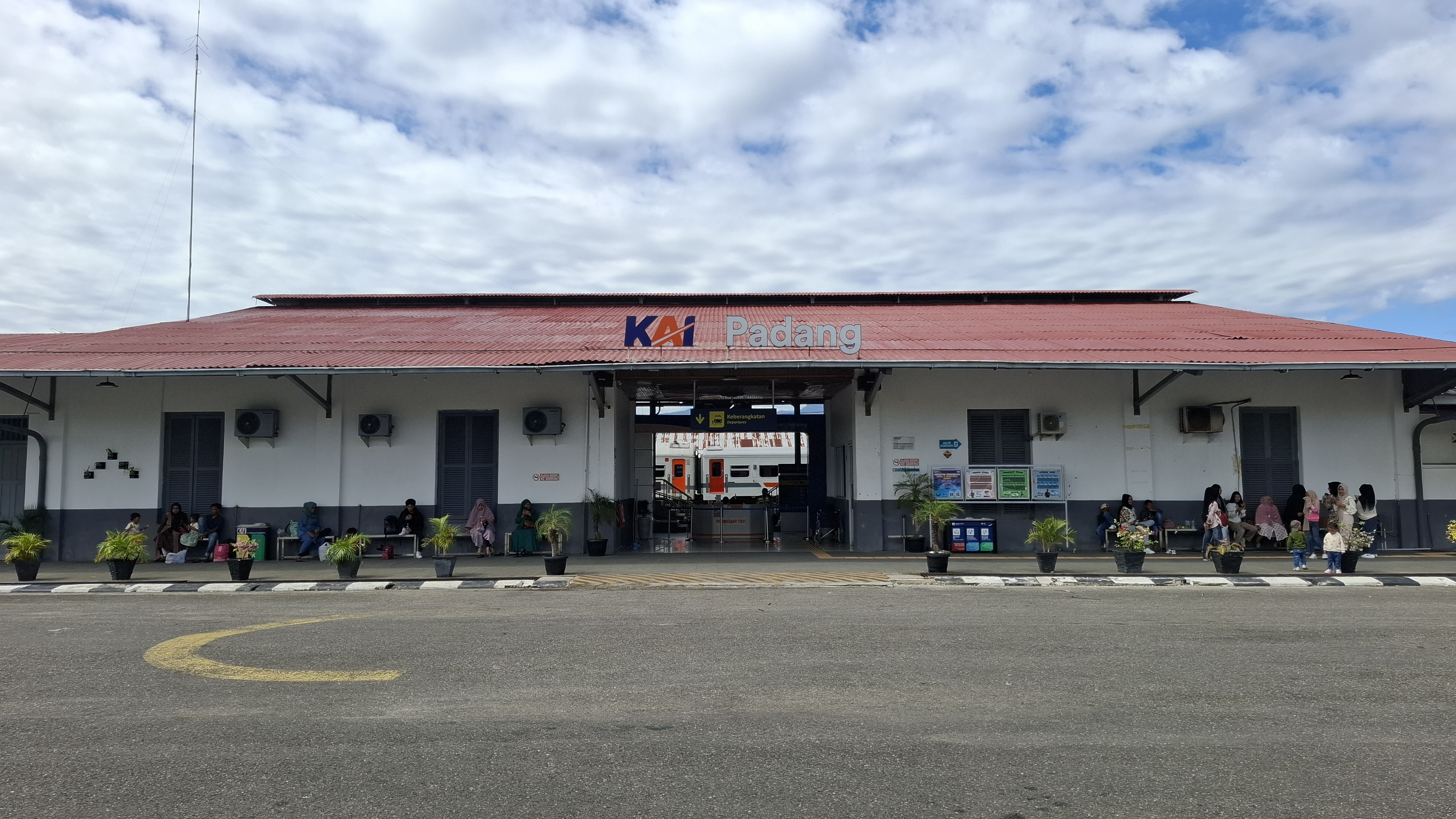
- Entrance of Padang Station (2025)

General information
- Other names: Simpang Haru Station
- Location: Jl. Stasiun No. 1, Simpang Haru, East Padang, Padang; West Sumatra; Indonesia
- Coordinates: 0.941805°S 100.373696°E
- Elevation: +8 m (26 ft)
- Owner: Kereta Api Indonesia
- Operator: Kereta Api Indonesia
- Lines: Minangkabau Express; S Sibinuang
- Platforms: 2 island platforms 1 side platform
- Tracks: 7

Construction
- Structure type: Ground
- Parking: Available
- Accessible: Available

Other information
- Station code: PD • 7020
- Classification: Class I

History
- Opened: 1 July 1891

Services
Preceding station	Kereta Api Indonesia	Following station
Tarandam towards Pulau Aie	Minangkabau Airport Rail Link	Alai towards Minangkabau International Airport
Terminus	Sibinuang	Alai towards Naras
Location
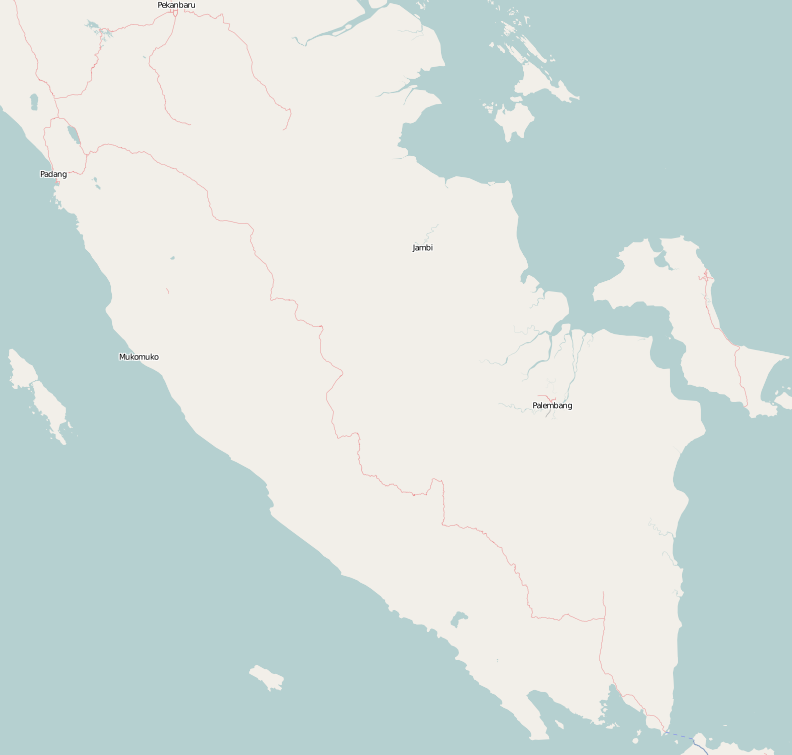
- Location within Southern Sumatra

Padang Station (PD) is a railway station of the Pulau Aie–Padang Panjang railway and Teluk Bayur–Padang railway located at Jl. Stasiun No. 1, Simpang Haru, Eastern Padang, Padang, West Sumatra.

== History ==
Staatsspoorwegen ter Sumatra's Westkust (SSS), a division of Staatsspoorwegen, was built a railroad in West Sumatra based on a concession issued by the Dutch East Indies government which was approved by the Dutch parliament in September 1887. Construction began on 6 July 1889 to connect Padang with the well-known Ombilin coal mine in Sawahlunto. In detail, the railroad line consists of Emmahaven (Teluk Bayur)-Padang Station which was inaugurated on 1 October 1892, and Pulau Aie–Padang Panjang on 1 July 1891.

Padang Station currently serves Sibinuang train to and from Pariaman and Naras and, since 2018, Minangkabau Express airport train to and from Minangkabau International Airport dedicated station. Presently the railroad to Pulau Aie which starts from track 1 has been reactivated and the expansion of the station building has been carried out.

== Station layout ==
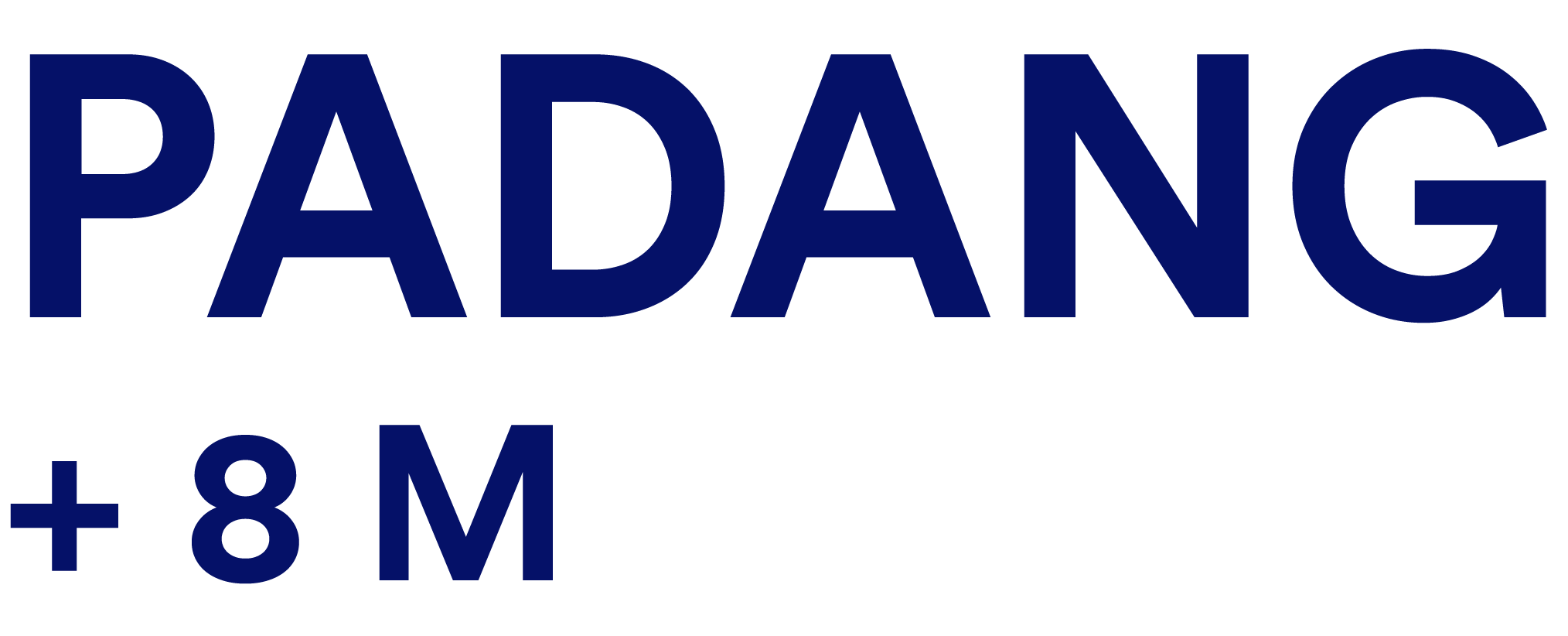
Line 7

Rail siding

Line 6

Line 5

Line 4

Line 3
← (Alai)
S Sibinuang to Naras dan Pauh Lima
(Pauh Lima) →
Island platform
Line 2
← (Alai)
Straight track

S Sibinuang to Naras dan Pauh Lima

(Pauh Lima) →
Island platform
Line 1
← (Alai)
Minangkabau Express Minangkabau International Airport and Pulau Aie
(Tarandam) →
Side platform
Main building

== Services ==
Railway services that utilise this station:

Train	Destination
Minangkabau Express	Tabing, Duku, Minangkabau
S Sibinuang Commuter	Pasar Alai, Air Tawar, Tabing, Lubuk Buaya, Duku, Lubuk Alung, Pauh Kambar, Kuraitaji, Pariaman

== Supporting transportation ==
Public transportation type	Route	Destination
Trans Padang	6	City Center–Unand Limau Manis Campus

== Gallery ==
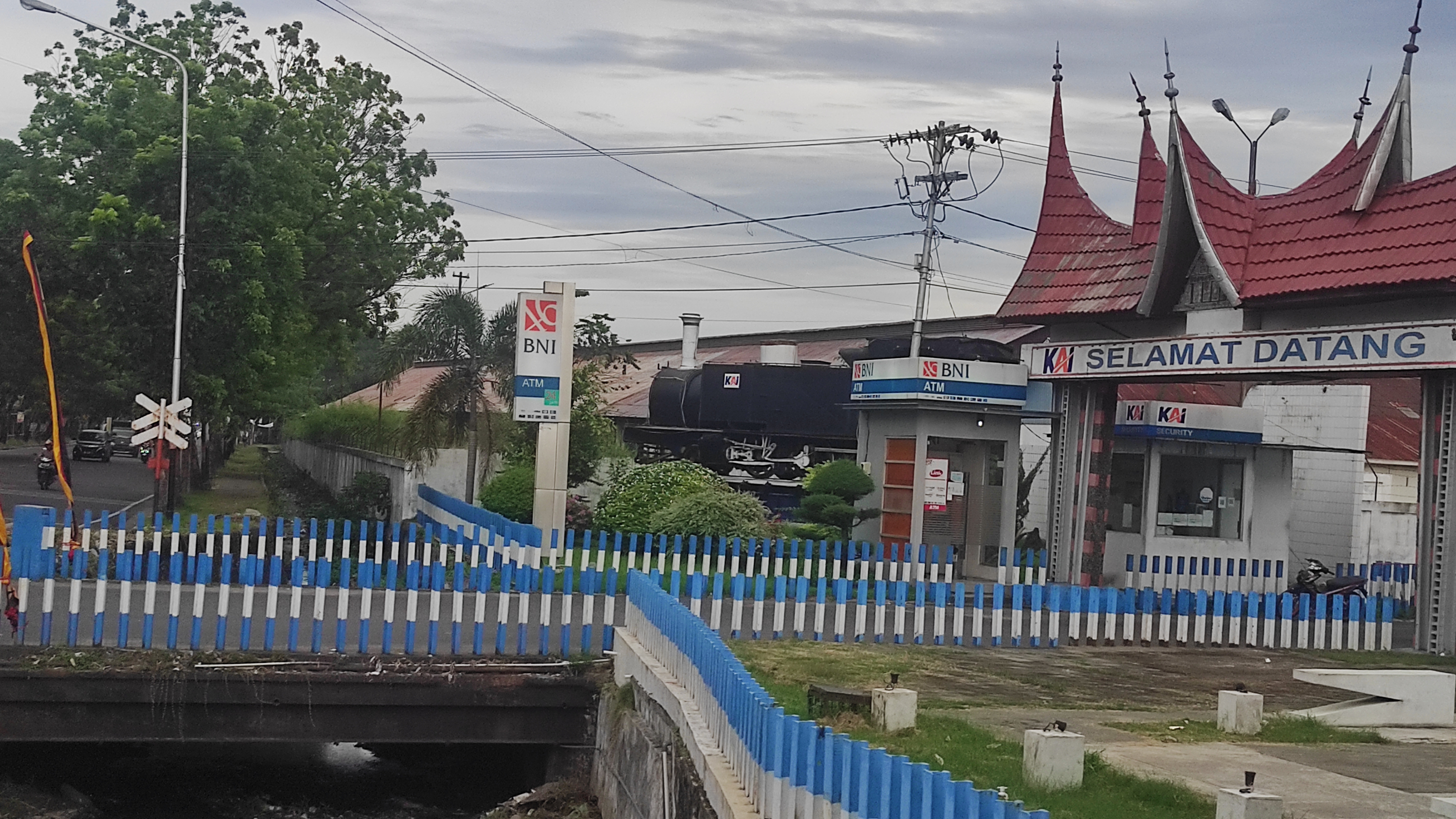
The entrance of the station

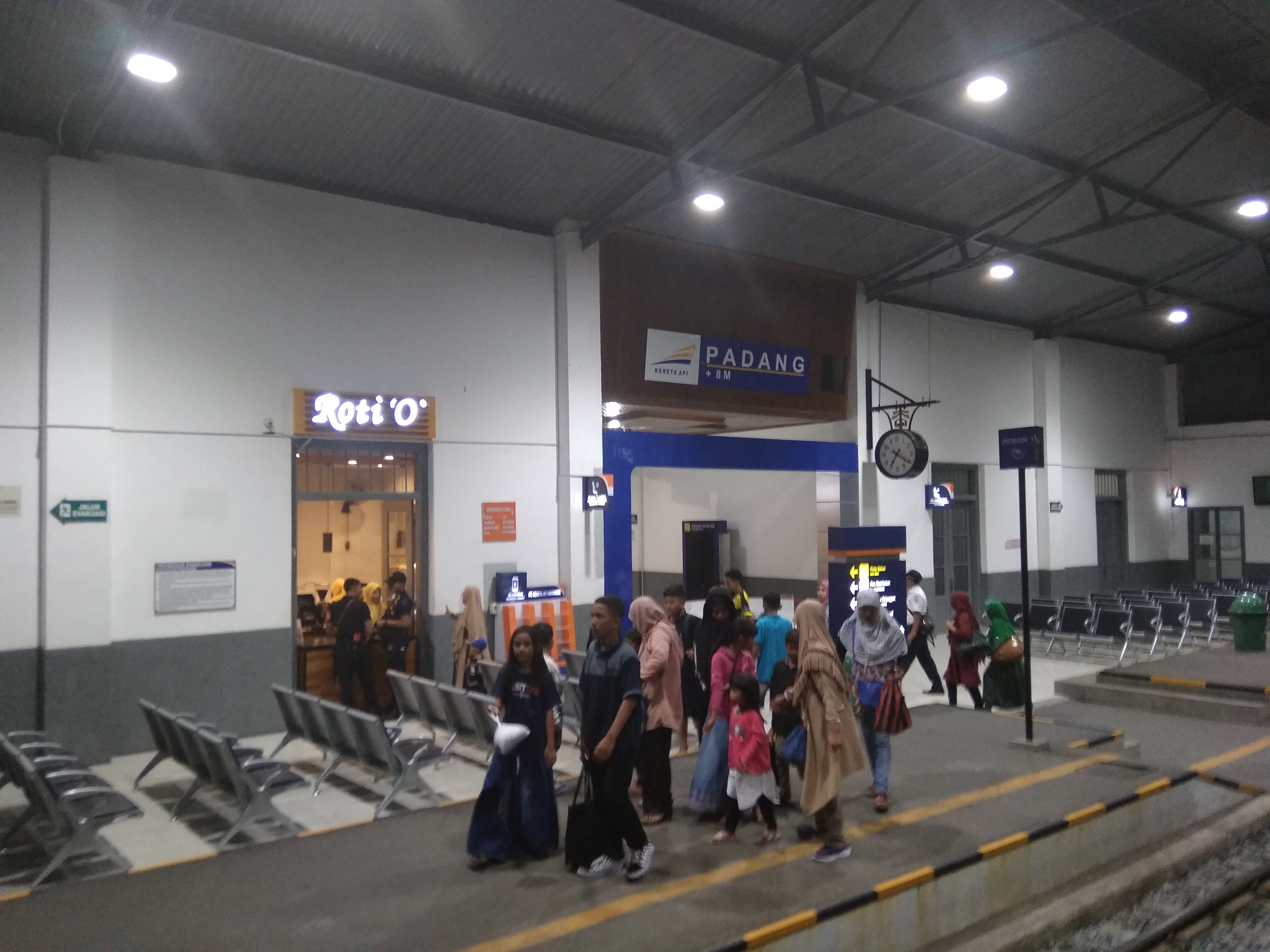
The interior of the station at night

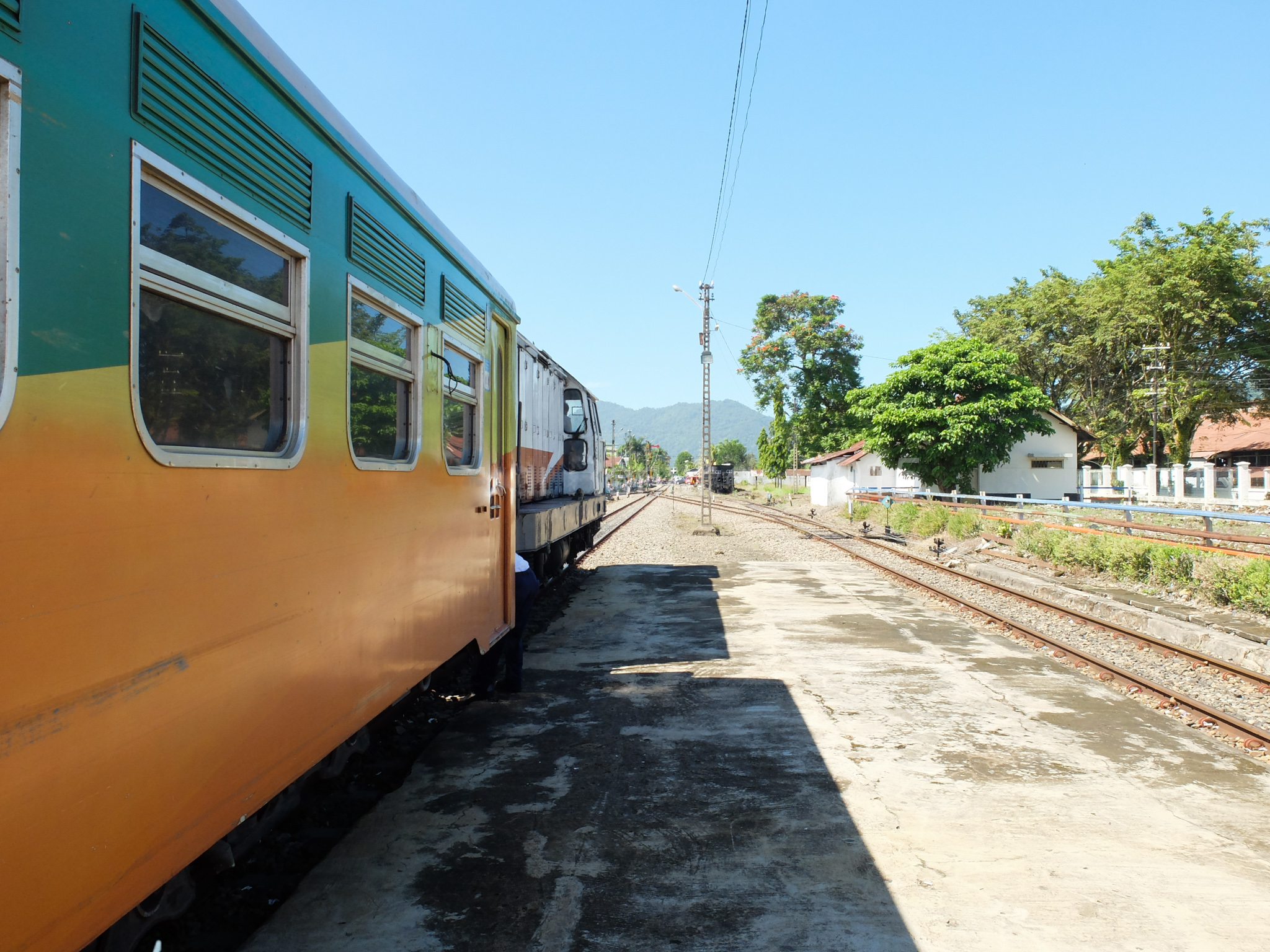
Sibinuang train arriving at Padang Station

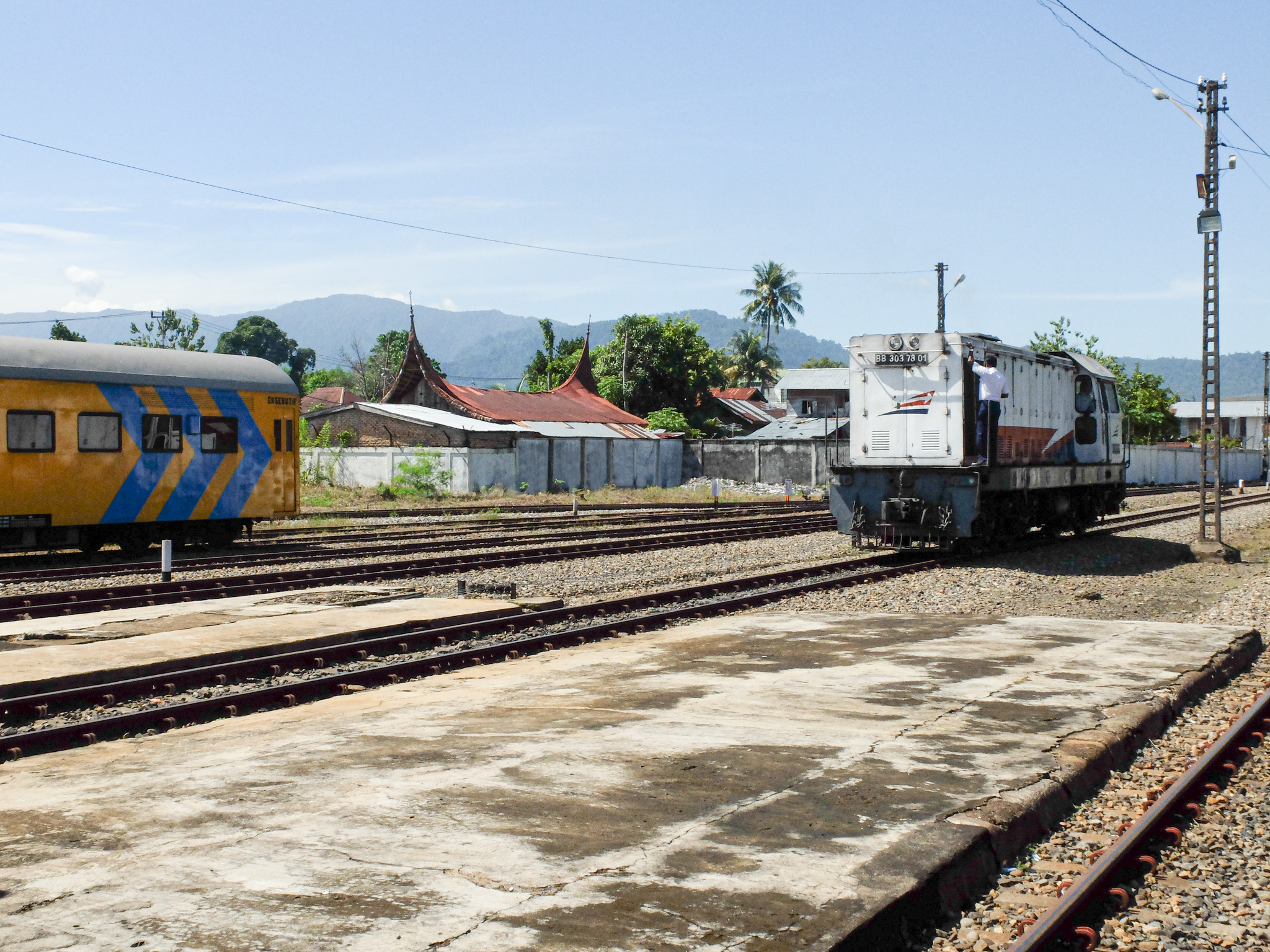
Locomotive shunting activity at Padang Station

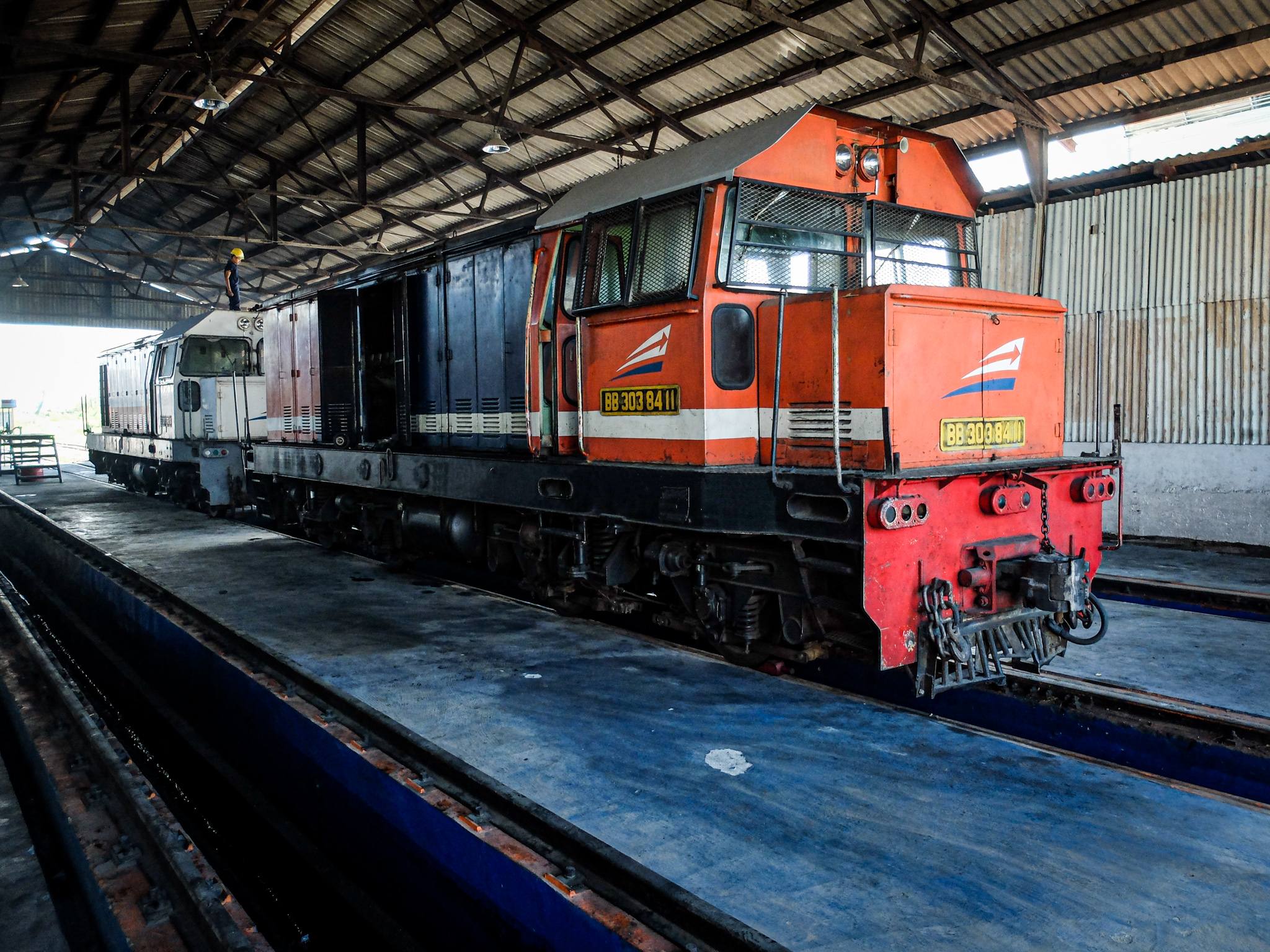
BB 303 locomotive at the Padang locomotive depot

Preceding station	Kereta Api Indonesia	Following station
Tarandam towards Pulau Aie	Pulau Aie–Padang Panjang	Alai towards Padang Panjang
Bukit Putus towards Teluk Bayur	Teluk Bayur–Padang	Terminus
