= Chilo railway station =

Railway station in Rajasthan, India

Chilo

General information
- Location: National Highway 89, Chilo, Nagaur district, Rajasthan; India
- Coordinates: 27.446624°N 73.525461°E
- Elevation: 302 metres (991 ft)
- System: Indian Railways station
- Owner: Indian Railways
- Operator: North Western Railway
- Line: Jodhpur–Bathinda line
- Platforms: 1
- Tracks: Single Electric-Line

Construction
- Structure type: Standard (on-ground station)

Other information
- Status: Functioning
- Station code: CLO
- Zone(s): North Western Railway
- Division(s): Jodhpur

Services
Preceding station	Indian Railways	Following station
Shri Balaji towards ?	North Western Railway zone Jodhpur–Bathinda line	Nokha towards ?
Location
- Interactive map

Chilo railway station is a railway station located on the Jodhpur–Bathinda railway line operated by the North Western Railway zone under Jodhpur railway division. It is situated beside National Highway 89 at Chilo in Nagaur district in the Indian state of Rajasthan.
