= LBY =

LBY or lby may refer to:

- LBY, the ISO 3166-1 alpha-3 code for Libya
- LBY, the station code for Lüboyuan railway station, Henan, China
- LBY, the station code for Lubuk Buaya railway station, West Sumatra, Indonesia
- lby, the ISO 639-3 code for Lamalama language, Queensland, Australia
