= Kurai Taji railway station =

Railway station in Indonesia

Kurai Taji Station Stasiun Kurai Taji
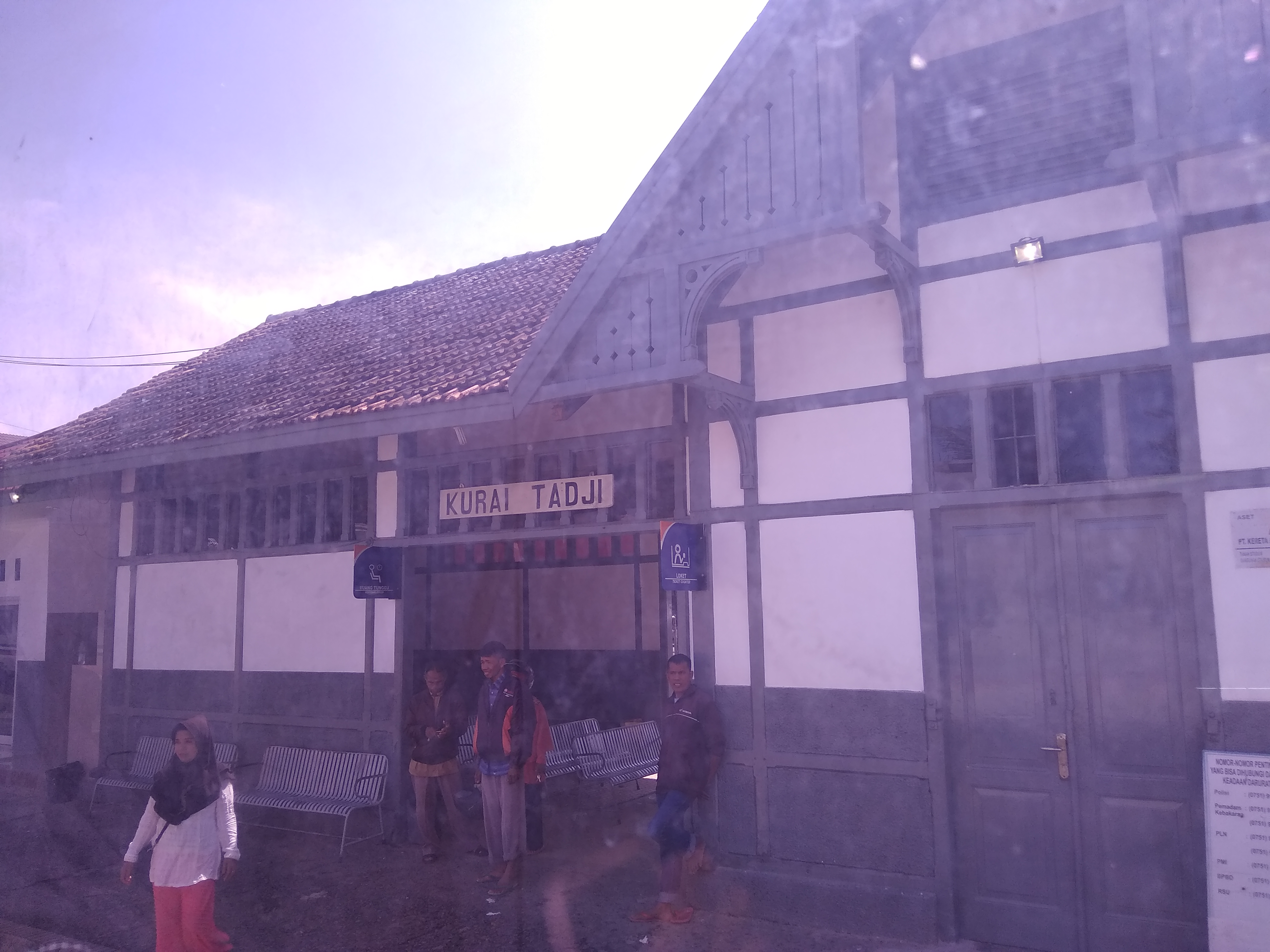
- Main building Kurai Taji, Taken of 4 July 2019.

General information
- Location: Balai Kurai Taji, South Pariaman, Pariaman; West Sumatra; Indonesia
- Coordinates: 0.633°S 100.1702°E
- Elevation: +15 m (49 ft)
- Owner: Kereta Api Indonesia
- Operator: Kereta Api Indonesia
- Line: Lubuk Alung–Naras
- Platforms: 1 side platform 1 island platform
- Tracks: 2

Construction
- Structure type: Ground
- Parking: Unavailable
- Accessible: Available

Other information
- Station code: KI
- Classification: Halt

History
- Opened: 1908
Location
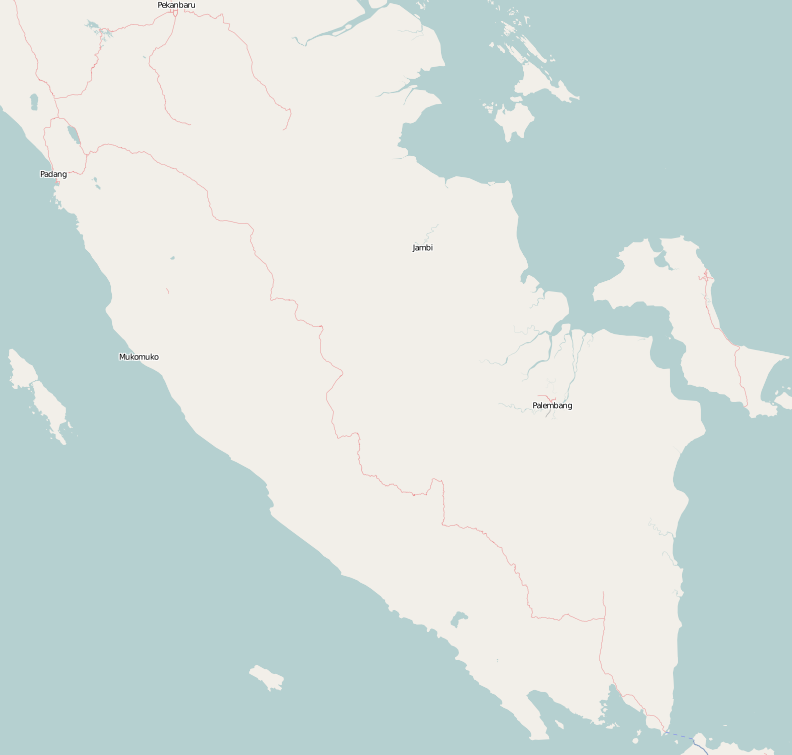
- Location within Southern Sumatra

Kurai Taji Station (KI) is a railway station located at Balai Kurai Taji, South Pariaman, Pariaman. The railway station, which is located at an altitude of +15 meters, is included in the Regional Division II West Sumatra. The railway station is not far from the traditional market.

== Services ==
There is only one passenger train journey, namely Sibinuang towards Padang and towards Naras.

Preceding station	Kereta Api Indonesia	Following station
Pauh Kambar towards Lubuk Alung	Lubuk Alung–Naras	Cimparuh towards Naras
