= Shri Balaji railway station =

Railway station in Rajasthan, India

General information
- Location: Karnetpura, Shri Balaji, Nagaur district, Rajasthan; India
- Coordinates: 27.416761°N 73.537382°E
- Elevation: 296 metres (971 ft)
- System: Indian Railways station
- Owner: Indian Railways
- Operator: North Western Railway
- Line: Jodhpur–Bathinda line
- Platforms: 1
- Tracks: Single Electric-Line

Construction
- Structure type: Standard (on-ground station)

Other information
- Status: Functioning
- Station code: SBLJ
- Zone(s): North Western Railway
- Division(s): Jodhpur

Services
Preceding station	Indian Railways	Following station
Alai towards ?	North Western Railway zone Jodhpur–Bathinda line	Chilo towards ?
Location
- Interactive map

Shri Balaji railway station is a railway station located on the Jodhpur–Bathinda railway line operated by the North Western Railway zone under Jodhpur railway division. It is situated at Karnetpura, Shri Balaji in Nagaur district in the Indian state of Rajasthan.
