= Minangkabau Express =

Airport rail link in Indonesia

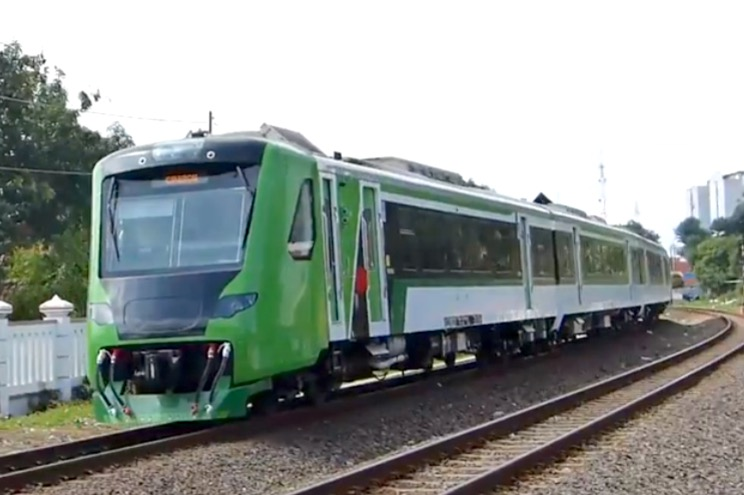
- Minangkabau Express DMU during test run at Cirebon

Overview
- Native name: KA Minangkabau Ekspres
- Status: Operational
- Owner: PT Kereta Api Indonesia & PT Angkasa Pura II
- Locale: West Sumatera, Indonesia
- Termini: BIM; Padang
- Website: www.kai.id

Service
- Type: Express rail
- System: Airport rail link
- Services: BIM - Duku - Tabing - Padang - Pulau Aie
- Operator: PT Kereta Api Indonesia [id]
- Rolling stock: Two INKA DMU; 4-carriage trainsets
- Daily ridership: 0.4 million (Jan-Oct '24)

History
- Opened: 21 May 2018; 8 years ago

Technical
- Line length: 23 km (14 mi)
- Character: Ground
- Track gauge: 1,067 mm (3 ft 6 in)
- Electrification: NIL
- Operating speed: 60 km/h (37 mph)

Minangkabau Express (Indonesian: KA Minangkabau Ekspres) is an airport rail link service in West Sumatra, Indonesia. This line was built to cut travel time from Padang city centre to the Minangkabau International Airport in Padang Pariaman Regency, as roads connecting the airport and the city center are frequently affected by traffic congestion.

The Minangkabau Express is the third airport rail link in Indonesia after Kualanamu ARS and Soekarno–Hatta ARS. It was inaugurated by President Joko Widodo on 21 May 2018.

== Background ==
The 23-kilometre (14 mi) link was established using existing and new rail tracks. An existing line between Duku railway station and Padang was upgraded. This was then connected to a new 3.9-kilometre (2.4 mi) track between Duku and the airport. All land acquisitions were done in March 2017.

The service is provided by PT Kereta Api Indonesia, with trains running between Padang–Tabing–Duku–Minangkabau International Airport. The rolling stock was manufactured by INKA.

== Rolling Stock ==
This train uses a KRDE ME 204 trainset made by PT INKA as well as Adisumarmo Airport Rail Link and Yogyakarta International Airport Rail Link and is also the first trainset for the KRDE series and then followed by the next trainset for other Airport Trains. This series of trains consists of four trains with a carrying capacity of up to 393 people.

== Fee ==
This train fare is IDR 10,000.00 for the BIM–Duku and BIM–Aie Island routes and IDR 5,000.00 for the Duku–Aie Island route and vice versa.

== Operation ==
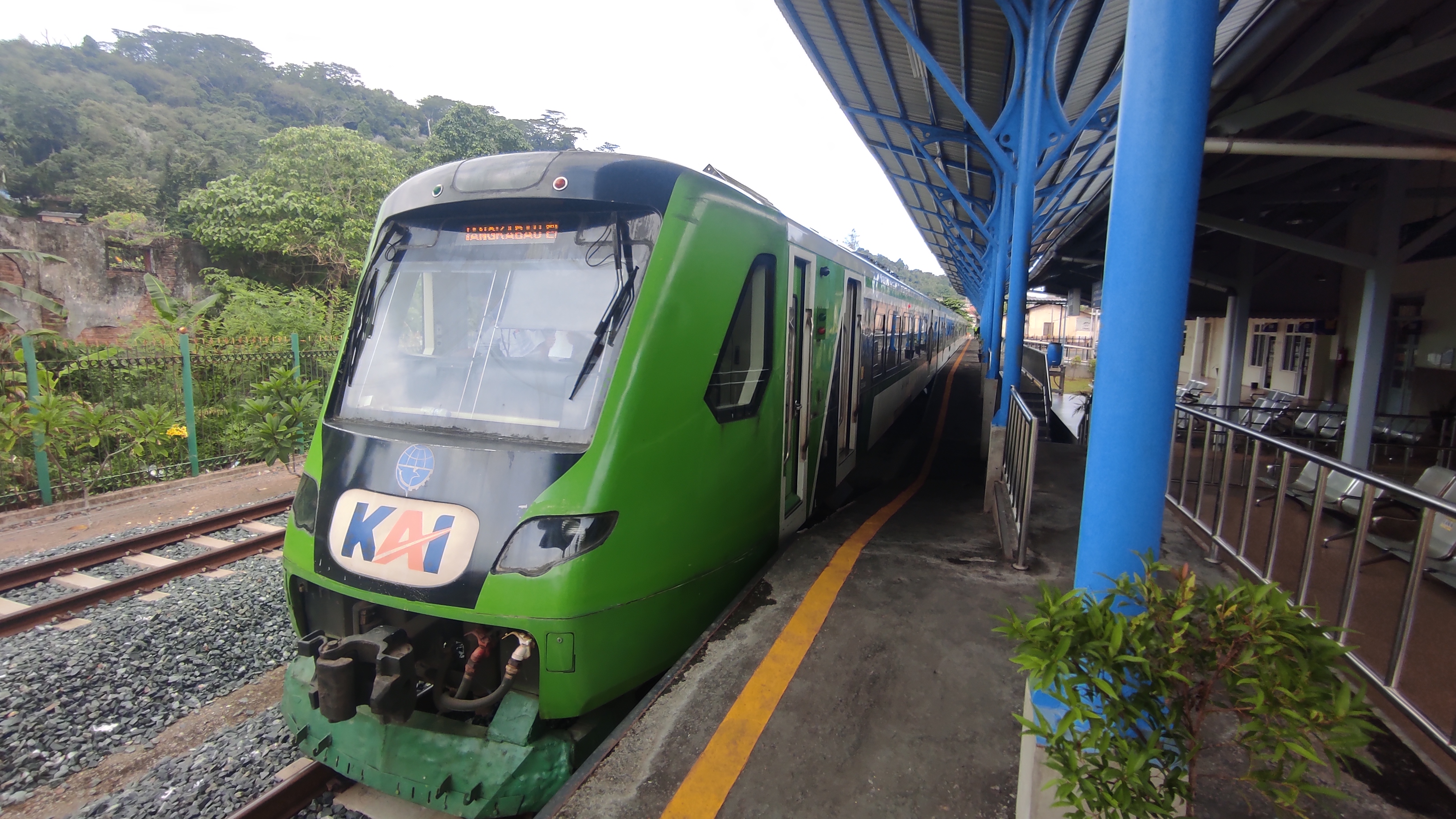
Minangkabau Express at Pulau Aie Station

Starting 6 March 2019, Minangkabau Express experienced an increase in schedule at night, schedule changes and began to stop at several stops along the route passed, except for Lubuk Buaya. The change in the train schedule also aims to facilitate transit with Anai Rail Bus via Duku Station for passengers who want to travel to Kayu Tanam Station.

Along with the reactivation of the Padang-Pulau Air railway line, the Minangkabau Express train journey has been extended to Pulau Air Station on 10 February 2021 to support tourism in the Kota Tua area in Kampung Pondok, West Padang, Padang. In addition, the train will stop at a new station building at Padang Station specifically for this Airport Train. Since the extension of the relationship to Pulau Aie Station, the train returned to Padang Station after finishing service at night and then sent the train to Pulau Aie Station before the start of the train service in the morning.

== See also ==
- Pariaman Express
- Kualanamu Airport Rail Link
- Soekarno–Hatta Airport Commuter Line
- Adisumarmo Airport Rail Link
- Padang metropolitan area
