= National Highway 89 (India, old numbering) =

Old national highway in India

National Highway 89

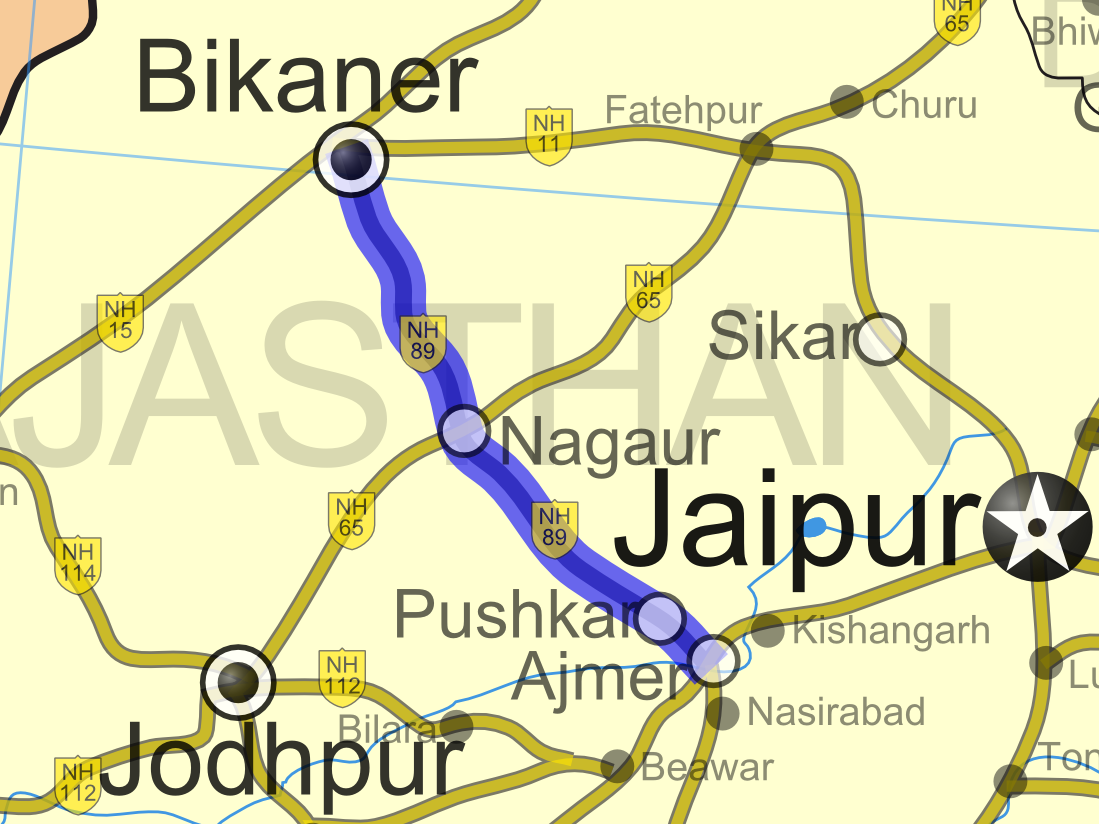

Route information
- Length: 300 km (190 mi)

Major junctions
- From: Ajmer
- To: Bikaner

Location
- Country: India
- States: Rajasthan: 300 km (190 mi)
- Primary destinations: Ajmer - Nagaur - Bikaner

Highway system
- Roads in India; Expressways; National; State; Asian
← NH 88	→ NH 90

National Highway 89 (NH 89) was a National Highway in India entirely within the state of Rajasthan. NH 89 linked Ajmer to Bikaner and is 300 km (190 mi) long. In 2010, the highway was renumbered to form parts of present-day NH 62 and NH 58, with the section from Ajmer to Nagaur being replaced by NH 62, while the section from Nagaur to Bikaner was renumbered as NH 58.

== See also ==
- List of national highways in India
