= Minangkabau International Airport railway station =

Railway station in Indonesia

Minangkabau International Airport Station Stasiun Bandara International Minangkabau
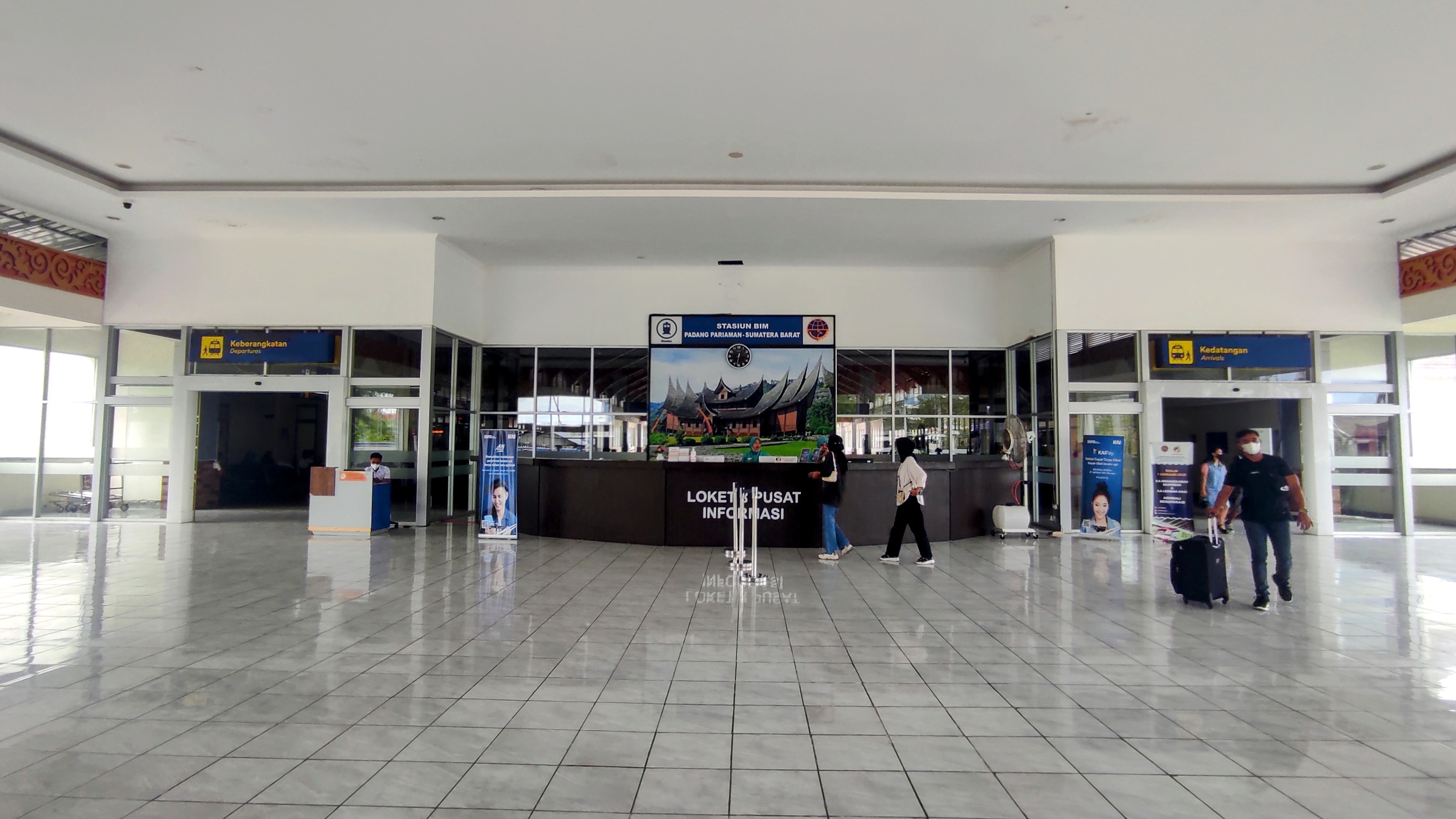
- Minangkabau Airport Rail Link arrived at Minangkabau International Airport Station.

General information
- Location: Jl. Bandara Minangkabau, Katapiang, Batang Anai, Padang Pariaman Regency; West Sumatra; Indonesia
- Coordinates: 0.783436°S 100.286383°E
- Elevation: +2 m (6.6 ft)
- Owner: Kereta Api Indonesia
- Operator: Kereta Api Indonesia
- Lines: Minangkabau Express; L Lembah Anai Railbus
- Platforms: 2 side platforms
- Tracks: 2

Construction
- Structure type: Ground
- Parking: Available
- Accessible: Available
- Architectural style: Rumah Gadang

Other information
- Station code: BIM
- IATA code: PDG
- Classification: Class I

History
- Opened: 21 May 2018

Services
Preceding station	Kereta Api Indonesia	Following station
Duku towards Pulau Aie	Minangkabau Airport Rail Link	Terminus
Location
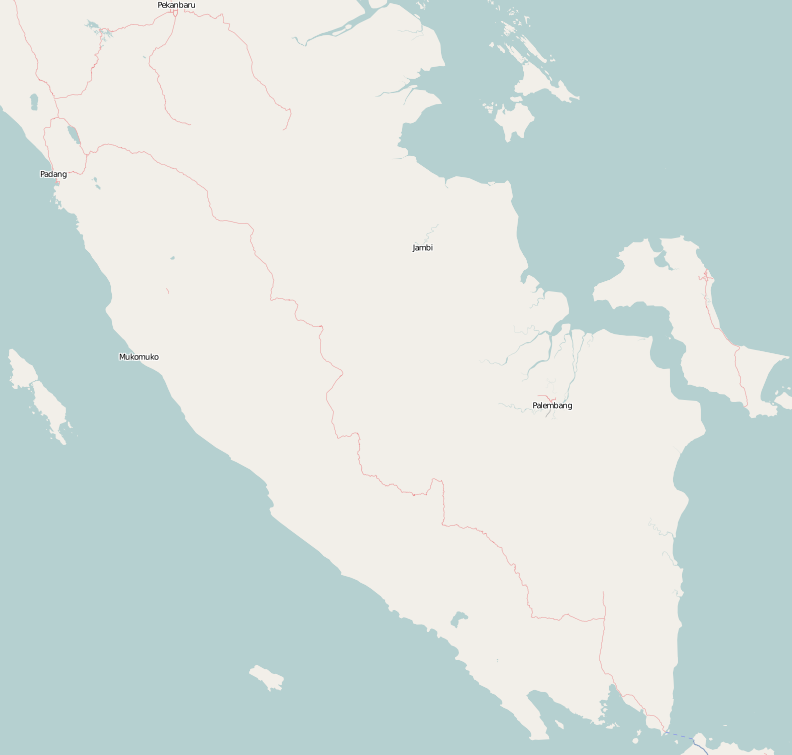
- Location within Southern Sumatra

Minangkabau International Airport Station (BIM) is a class I airport railway station located on airport complex in Katapiang, Batang Anai, Padang Pariaman Regency. The position of this station is to the northeast of the airport's passenger terminal. The station, which is located at an altitude of +2 meters, is included in the Regional Division II West Sumatra.

This station was completed in 2016–2017 and only started operating with the inauguration of the Minangkabau Airport Rail Link by President of Indonesia Joko Widodo on 21 May 2018.

The station is the third airport railway station in Indonesia, after Maguwo station and Kualanamu station.

== Station layout ==
This station only have two railway tracks with line 2 is a straight track.

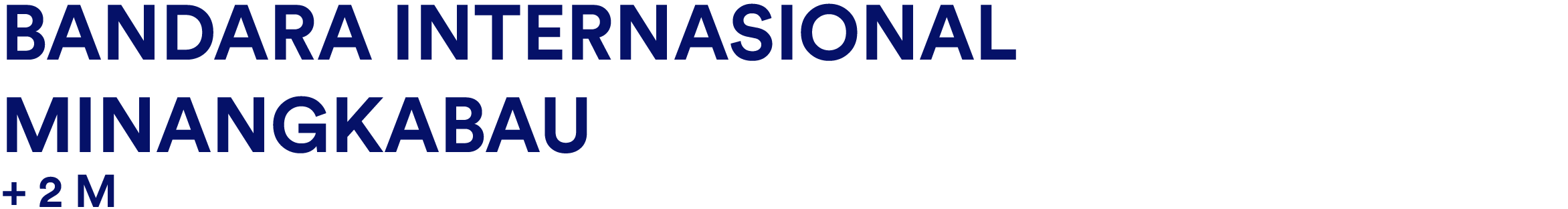

P

Exit/entrance gate

Side platform, the doors are opened on the left side
Line 1
L Lembah Anai Railbus from and towards Kayu Tanam
(Duku) →
Line 2
Straight track

Minangkabau Express from and towards Pulau Aie

(Duku) →
Side platform, the doors are opened on the right side

== Services ==
The following is a list of train services at the Minangkabau International Airport Station.

=== Passenger services ===
- Economy commuter
  - Lembah Anai railbus, to Kayu Tanam
- Airport rail link
  - Minangkabau Express to Pulau Aie

Preceding station	Kereta Api Indonesia	Following station
Duku Terminus	Minangkabau Int'l Airport–Duku	Terminus
