= Minangkabau International Airport =

Airport serving Padang, West Sumatra, Indonesia

Minangkabau International Airport Bandar Udara Internasional Minangkabau
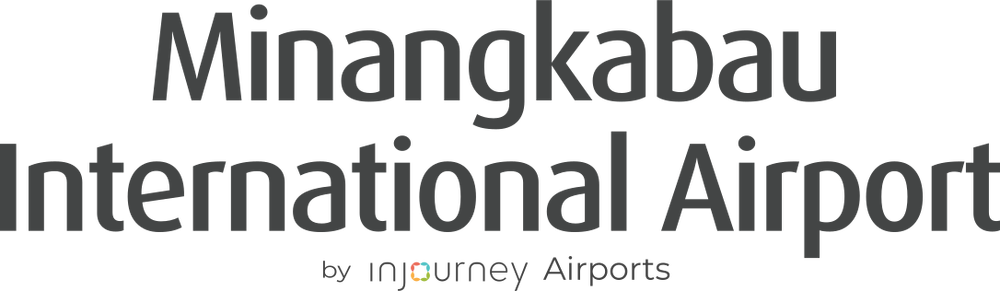

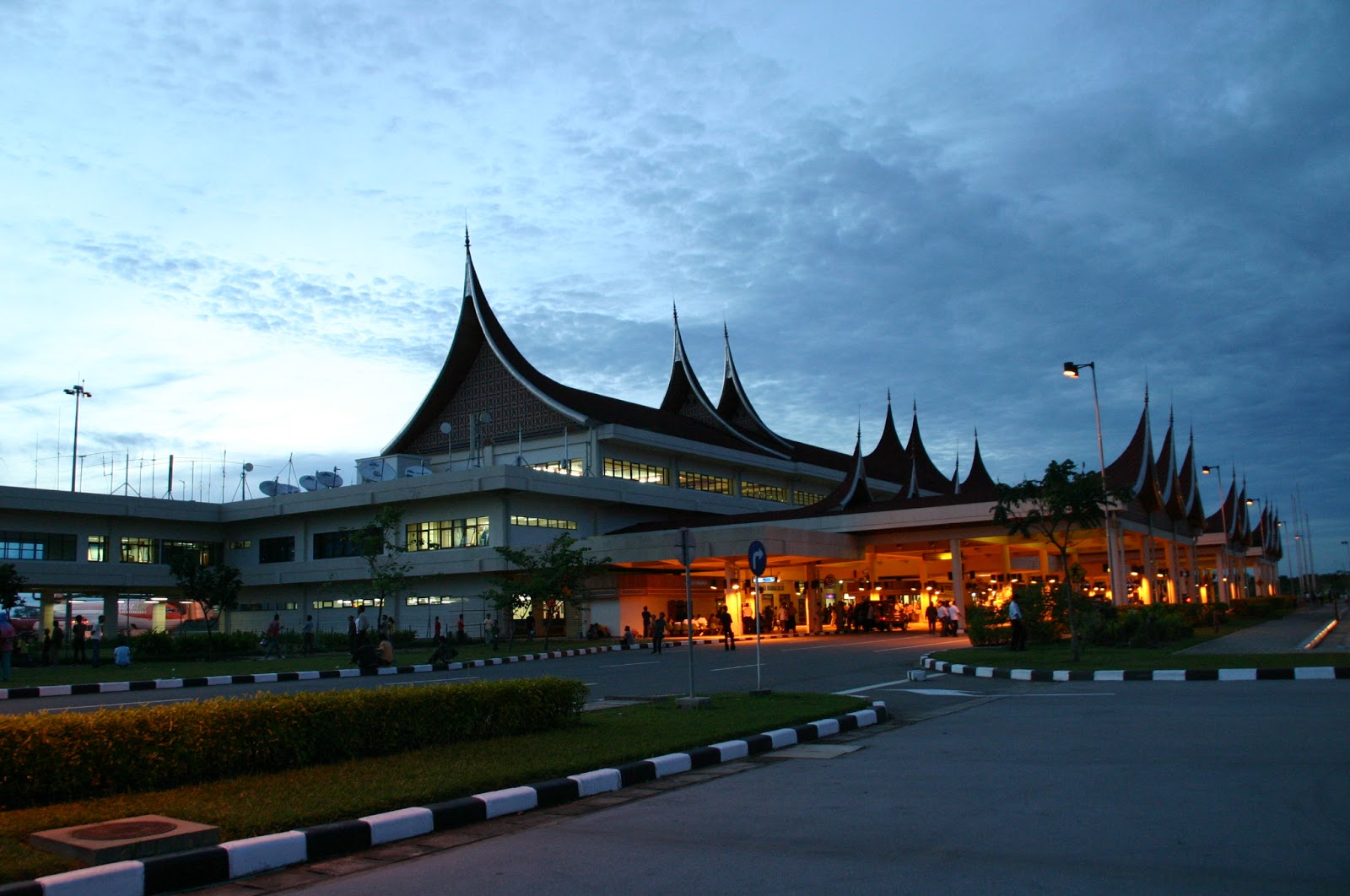
- IATA: PDG; ICAO: WIEE; WMO: 96163

Summary
- Airport type: Public
- Owner: Government of Indonesia
- Operator: InJourney Airports
- Serves: Padang
- Location: Ketaping, Padang Pariaman Regency, West Sumatra, Indonesia
- Opened: 22 July 2005; 21 years ago
- Time zone: WIB (UTC+07:00)
- Elevation AMSL: 18 ft (5.5 m)
- Coordinates: 00°47′12″S 100°16′50″E
- Website: www.minangkabau-airport.co.id

Maps
- Sumatra region in Indonesia

- Location of airport in West Sumatra / Indonesia PDG/WIEE (Indonesia)

Runways
Direction	Length		Surface
Direction	m	ft	Surface
15/33	3,000	9,843	Asphalt

Statistics (2024)
- Passengers: 2,273,642 (▼5.3%)
- Cargo (tonnes): 10,509 (▲25.5%)
- Aircraft movements: 18,092 (▲0.8%)
- Source: DGCA

Minangkabau International Airport (IATA: PDG, ICAO: WIEE) is an international airport serving Padang, the capital of West Sumatra, on the island of Sumatra, Indonesia. The airport is located in Ketaping, Padang Pariaman Regency, approximately 23 km (14 mi) northwest of Padang city center. It commenced operations in July 2005, replacing Tabing Airport as the city's main airport. Tabing Airport now serves exclusively as a military airbase for the Indonesian Air Force. The relocation was prompted by the limited availability of land at the former airport, which prevented further expansion, while increasing passenger traffic had also resulted in growing congestion and capacity constraints. The airport is named after the Minangkabau ethnic group, the indigenous population of West Sumatra. It functions as the main gateway to Padang and West Sumatra, with domestic connections to major cities in western Indonesia such as Jakarta, Pekanbaru, and Medan, as well as international flights to Malaysia and Singapore.

== History ==
=== Background and construction ===
Proposals to construct a new airport to replace Tabing Airport had been under consideration since the 1980s, as the existing airport faced several constraints that limited its long-term development. The main constraints were the surrounding terrain and limitations in aviation safety infrastructure. Located in an area surrounded by hills, Tabing Airport faced challenges to flight operations and had limited scope for further expansion. In addition, its existing aviation safety facilities were considered inadequate in both capacity and condition. Due to its proximity to the city center, increasing population density around the airport further raised concerns about aviation safety and its long-term viability. In response to these constraints, the government decided to relocate the airport to a new site. As part of the preparations, approximately 68 hectares of land in Ketaping, Padang Pariaman Regency, were allocated for the construction of the new airport.

The West Sumatra provincial government, led by Governor Azwar Anas at the time, together with Anas Malik, the Regent of Padang Pariaman Regency, played an important role in overseeing the airport's planning and development, including identifying a suitable site and clearing land for construction. However, the project was subsequently delayed by the economic downturn following the 1980s oil glut, which led to the construction plans being stalled. Despite the construction project being stalled, the Overseas Economic Cooperation Fund of Japan (OECF) had completed a feasibility study for the proposed new airport by the 1990s. Meanwhile, the provincial government had cleared a significant portion of the site and completed a new bypass road connecting the area to the proposed airport site.

After years of planning and negotiations, physical construction of the new airport at Ketaping finally began in 2001, replacing Tabing Airport as the main airport serving Padang and the surrounding region. The project was funded through a soft loan of approximately 9.4 billion yen from the Japan Bank for International Cooperation (JBIC), supplemented by around Rp 97.6 billion from the Indonesian state budget (APBN), accounting for 10% of the total cost. The construction was undertaken by a Japanese joint venture between Shimizu and Marubeni, in collaboration with Indonesia's state-owned Adhi Karya. The airport was completed and officially inaugurated in 2005. The airport is capable of accommodating wide-body aircraft such as the Airbus A330, Boeing 747-400, and Boeing 777. After the opening of Minangkabau International Airport, Tabing Airport was permanently closed to commercial passenger services. It was subsequently taken over by the Indonesian Air Force and is now known as Sutan Sjahrir Air Force Base, classified as a Type B airbase.

=== Contemporary history ===
The airport sustained significant damage during the 2009 Sumatra earthquakes on 30 September 2009, including the collapse of approximately 100 metres of the roof, while sections of the ceiling in the boarding area also collapsed. Additionally, a portion of the airport's electrical network was severed. The airport was temporarily closed for safety reasons, resulting in all flights being cancelled or diverted to their origin airports. It reopened on 1 October, initially only for non-commercial flights carrying relief supplies and other humanitarian logistics, with commercial flights resuming shortly thereafter.

A major expansion of the airport was completed in 2017, carried out in two phases. The project included enlarging the terminal to 49,124 square meters, enabling the airport to accommodate up to 5.9 million passengers annually. The number of check-in counters was increased to 32, and the baggage handling system was upgraded with five conveyor belts. Additionally, the runway was extended from 2,750 meters to 3,000 meters, with a width of 45 meters, to support operations of larger aircraft. The number of taxiways was also increased to eight, with the goal of improving airside traffic flow, enhancing on-time performance, and accommodating a higher volume of flight operations.

In February 2023, the Ministry of Transportation announced plans to reduce the number of international airports in Indonesia from 32 to 15, with Minangkabau International Airport among those initially proposed for reclassification as a domestic airport. The policy was intended to increase domestic passenger movements and promote domestic tourism and mobility. The plan faced opposition from several parties, including the West Sumatra provincial government, and Minangkabau International Airport ultimately retained its international status.

In 2026, the Padang Pariaman Regency government proposed renaming the airport Syekh Burhanuddin International Airport, after Syekh Burhanuddin, a prominent Sufi scholar and practitioner of the Shattariyya order from Sintuk, Sintuk Toboh Gadang District, Padang Pariaman. He is regarded as an important figure in the spread of Islam and the development of the surau as centers of Islamic education in Minangkabau. The proposed name is expected to be submitted to the West Sumatra Provincial Government before being forwarded to the Ministry of Transportation, which has final authority over the airport's renaming.

== Facilities and development ==
=== Landside facilities ===
Check-in counters

Boarding gate

The airport is equiiped with one terminal building for both international flights and domestic flights. The airport has 32 check-in counters, five baggage conveyors, and nine ticket sales counters. The airport terminal's architecture incorporates the bagonjong (spired roof), a distinctive feature of Minangkabau vernacular architecture commonly found in the traditional rumah gadang houses of West Sumatra. The airport was originally designed to handle 2.87 million passengers annually, but passenger traffic reached 4.13 million in 2018. A major expansion completed in 2017 increased the terminal's annual capacity to approximately 5.9 million passengers. The terminal is equipped with various modern facilities, including restaurants, duty-free shops, and business-class lounges for passengers seeking premium services.

In 2026, the government announced plans to renovate the airport's terminal with an estimated budget of Rp553 billion. The renovation will introduce several improvements aimed at modernizing the terminal while incorporating Minangkabau cultural elements. The interior will be redesigned to combine contemporary architecture with traditional Minangkabau motifs, including Kaluak Paku and Pucuak Rebung carvings. Passenger facilities and comfort will also be improved through the refurbishment of the boarding lounge, enhancement of the terminal environment, and upgrading of restroom facilities to meet international standards and improve accessibility for passengers with disabilities. The renovation will also include improvements to passenger flow management, with the layouts of the check-in and commercial areas reorganized to create more spacious and efficient passenger movement. In addition, indoor greenery will be introduced at strategic locations throughout the terminal to create a more pleasant, cool, and relaxing environment for passengers. The renovation is estimated to be completed in the first quarter of 2027.

=== Airside facilities ===
When the airport began operations in 2005, it had a runway measuring 2,750 m × 45 m (9,022 ft × 148 ft). The runway was subsequently extended to 3,000 m × 45 m (9,843 ft × 148 ft) in 2017. Following the extension, the runway is currently capable of accommodating wide-body aircraft such as the Boeing 747 and Airbus A340. The runway is equipped with electronic navigation aids, including an Instrument Landing System (ILS), enabling the airport to accommodate night flights. The runway is planned to be extended to 3,600 m (11,811 ft) in the future, while a parallel taxiway is also planned to improve aircraft movement and operational efficiency. In addition, the airport is also equipped with an apron capable of accommodating up to 11 narrow-body aircraft, including the Boeing 737 and Airbus A320.

== Airlines and destinations ==
=== Passenger ===
Airlines	Destinations
AirAsia	Kuala Lumpur–International
Batik Air	Jakarta–Soekarno-Hatta
Batik Air Malaysia	Kuala Lumpur–International
Citilink	Jakarta–Halim Perdanakusuma, Jakarta–Soekarno-Hatta
Garuda Indonesia	Jakarta–Soekarno-Hatta
Lion Air	Batam, Jakarta–Soekarno-Hatta, Kuala Lumpur–International; Seasonal: Jeddah, Medina
Pelita Air	Jakarta–Soekarno-Hatta
Saudia	Seasonal: Medina
Scoot	Singapore
Super Air Jet	Bandung–Husein Sastranegara (begins 16 December 2026), Batam, Jakarta–Soekarno-Hatta, Medan, Yogyakarta–International
Susi Air	Batu Islands, Mukomuko, Pekanbaru, Sipora
Wings Air	Gunungsitoli

== Statistics ==
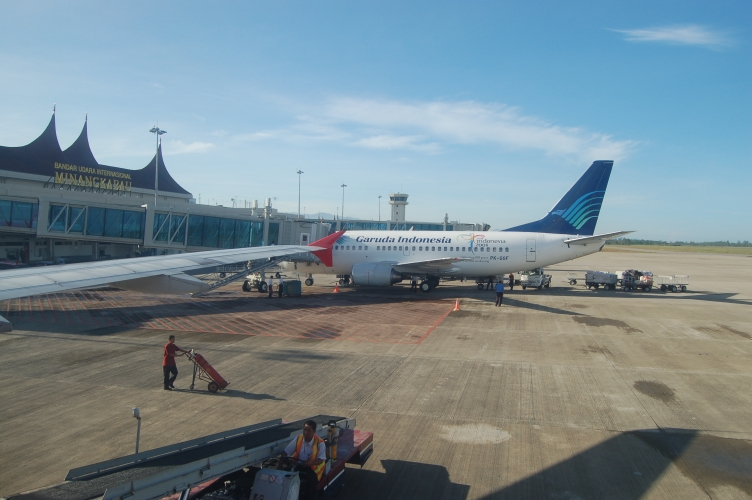
Garuda Indonesia Boeing 737-300 parked at Minangkabau International Airport

A Lion Air Airbus A330 at Minangkabau International Airport

Annual passenger numbers and aircraft statistics
Year	Passengers handled	Passenger % change	Cargo (tonnes)	Cargo % change	Aircraft movements	Aircraft % change
2006	1,578,871	Steady	7,044	Steady	14,171	Steady
2007	1,748,575	▲10.7	10,223	▲45.1	14,612	▲3.1
2008	1,653,401	▼5.4	12,251	▲19.8	N/A	Steady
2009	1,843,808	▲11.5	12,402	▲1.2	14,694	Steady
2010	1,793,849	▼2.7	13,474	▲8.6	16,660	▲13.4
2011	1,632,373	▼9.0	14,989	▲11.2	14,717	▼11.7
2012	2,643,719	▲62.0	10,128	▼32.4	16,474	▲11.9
2013	2,789,597	▲5.5	11,359	▲12.2	18,675	▲13.4
2014	2,791,412	▲0.1	11,568	▲1.8	18,620	▼0.3
2015	3,169,122	▲13.6	9,518	▼17.7	21,764	▲16.8
2016	3,600,150	▲13.6	15,350	▲61.3	25,634	▲17.7
2017	3,925,343	▲9.0	16,571	▲8.0	27,421	▲7.0
2018	4,139,601	▲5.5	18,835	▲13.7	29,990	▲9.4
2019	3,073,521	▼25.8	13,919	▼26.1	24,111	▼19.6
2020	1,271,716	▼58.6	11,187	▼19.6	12,286	▼49.0
2021	1,074,314	▼15.6	10,051	▼10.2	10.307	▼16.2
2022	1,887,489	▲75.6	8,432	▼16.2	14,446	▲40.1
2023	2,400,435	▲27.1	8,376	▼0.7	17,944	▲24.3
2024	2,273,642	▼5.3	10,509	▲25.5	18,092	▲0.8
^{Source: DGCA, BPS}

== Ground transportation ==
The airport can be reached by bus service, taxi, and airport train service.

=== Taxi ===
Passengers are encouraged to use metered taxi to avoid scams. Taxis are available anytime at the taxi parking area. They are usually available from 07:00 AM to 22:30 PM.

=== Train ===
A 3.9 km railway connecting the nearby Duku Station to the newly built Minangkabau International Airport Station was inaugurated by President Joko Widodo on 21 May 2018. From Duku Station, the railway continues to Padang Station. It is the third airport rail link in Indonesia after Kualanamu Airport Rail Link and Soekarno–Hatta Airport Commuter Line.

== Accidents and incidents ==
- On 2 August 2015, Citilink Flight 970, operating from Batam to Padang on an Airbus A320-200, skidded off the runway while landing at Minangkabau International Airport during heavy rain. The aircraft's nose landing gear left the runway. None of the 174 passengers were injured, although two passengers were taken to hospital as a precaution after experiencing shock.
