= Lubuk Alung railway station =

Railway station in West Sumatra, Indonesia

Lubuk Alung Station Stasiun Lubuk Alung
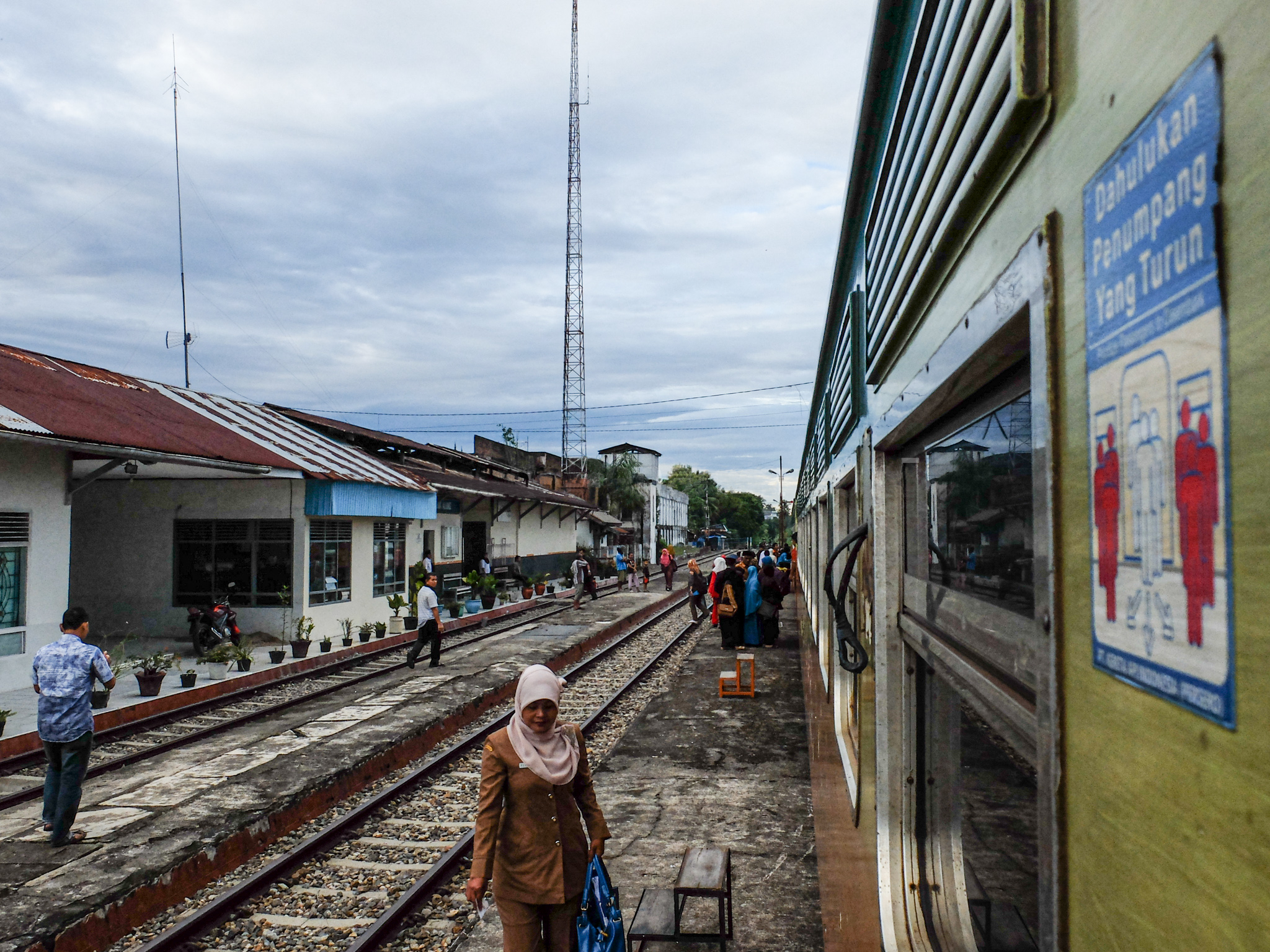
- Sibinuang train stopping at Lubuk Alung Station

General information
- Location: Lubuk Alung, Padang Pariaman; West Sumatra; Indonesia
- Coordinates: 0.960701°S 100.366013°E
- Elevation: +25 m (82 ft)
- Owner: Kereta Api Indonesia
- Operator: Kereta Api Indonesia
- Lines: Pulau Aie–Padang Panjang; Lubuk Alung–Naras–Sungai Limau
- Platforms: 4
- Tracks: 5

Construction
- Structure type: Ground

Other information
- Station code: LA
- Classification: Class II

Services
Preceding station	Kereta Api Indonesia	Following station
Duku towards Pauh Lima	Sibinuang	Pauh Kambar towards Naras
Location
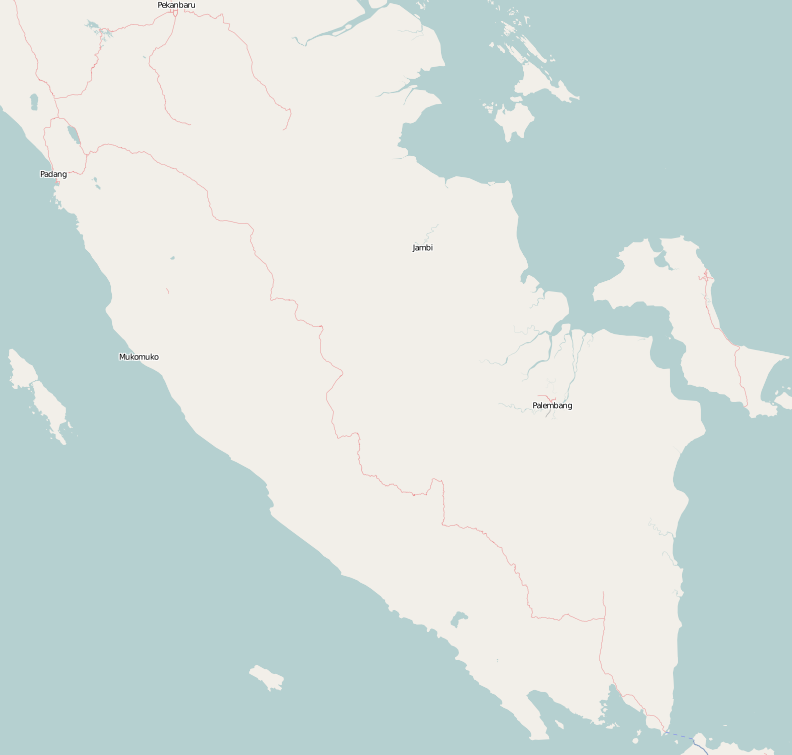
- Location within Southern Sumatra

Lubuk Alung Station (LA) is a class II train station located in Lubuk Alung, Padang Pariaman, Indonesia.

The station has five train lines with line 2 being a straight line in the direction of Duku - Padang and Kayu Tanam - Padang Panjang - Sawahlunto and line 3 being a straight line to and from Pariaman - Naras. Line 5 has been decommissioned.

== Services ==
- Sibinuang, to Padang and Naras (local economy)
- Lembah Anai, to Kayu Tanam and Duku, connected to Minangkabau Airport (economy commuter)

== Gallery ==
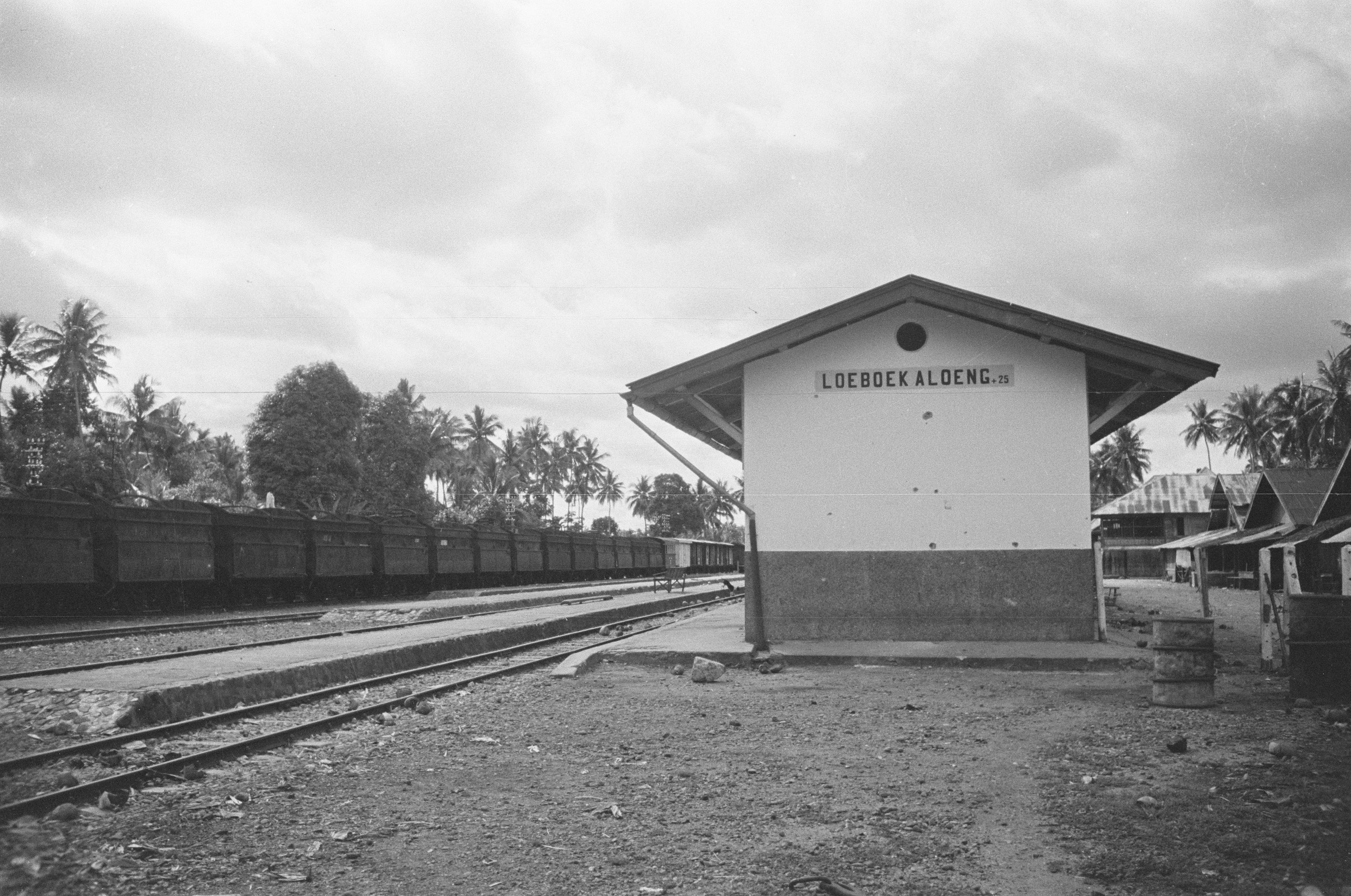
Lubuk Alung Station, 1947

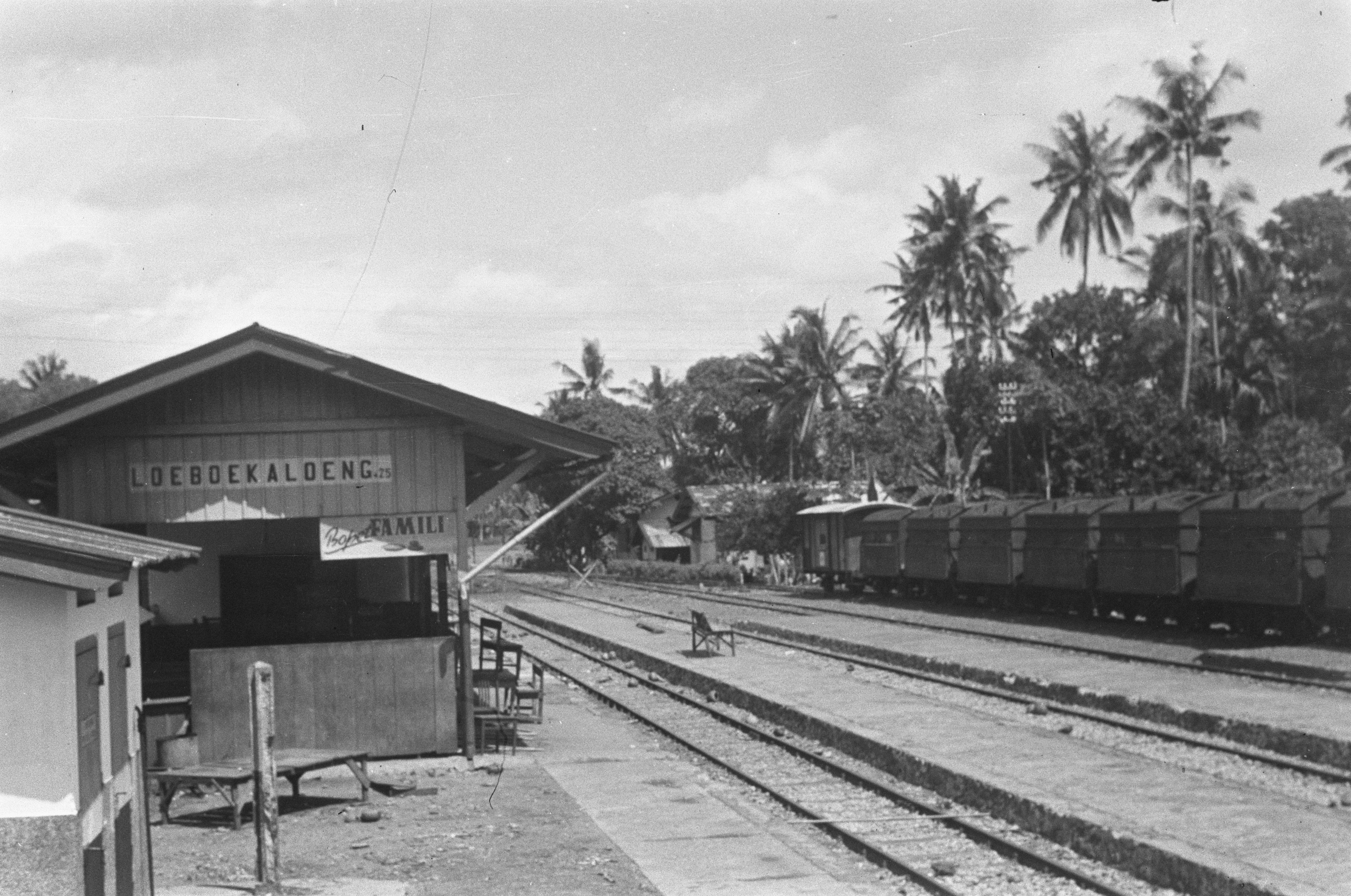
From a different angle. Take note, the waiting area is still completely wooden.
