= Pulau Aie railway station =

Railway station in Indonesia

Pulau Aie Station Stasiun Pulau Aie
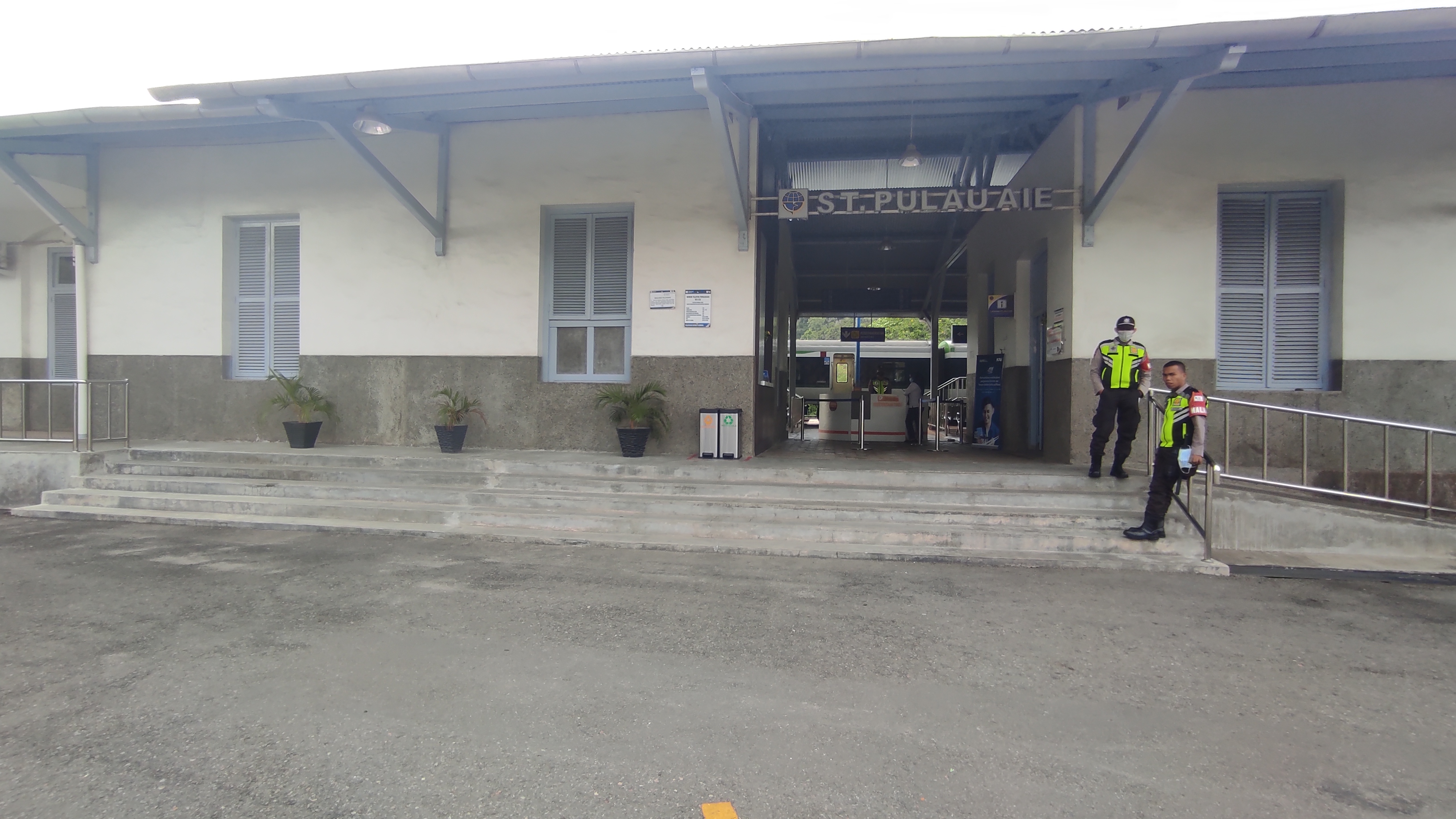
- Pulau Aie Station in 2022

General information
- Other names: Puluaer Station, Pulau Air Station
- Location: Jalan Pulau Air, Pasa Gadang, Padang Selatan, Padang; West Sumatra; Indonesia
- Coordinates: 0.960701°S 100.366013°E
- Elevation: +2 m (6.6 ft)
- Owner: Kereta Api Indonesia
- Operator: Kereta Api Indonesia
- Line: Pulau Aie–Padang Panjang
- Platforms: 1 side platform
- Tracks: 2

Construction
- Structure type: Ground
- Parking: Available
- Accessible: Available

Other information
- Station code: PLA
- Classification: Class I

History
- Opened: 1 July 1891; 10 February 2021 (reopened)
- Closed: 1980s
- Former names: Station Poeloe-Ajer

Services
Preceding station	Kereta Api Indonesia	Following station
Terminus	Minangkabau Airport Rail Link	Tarandam towards Minangkabau International Airport
Location
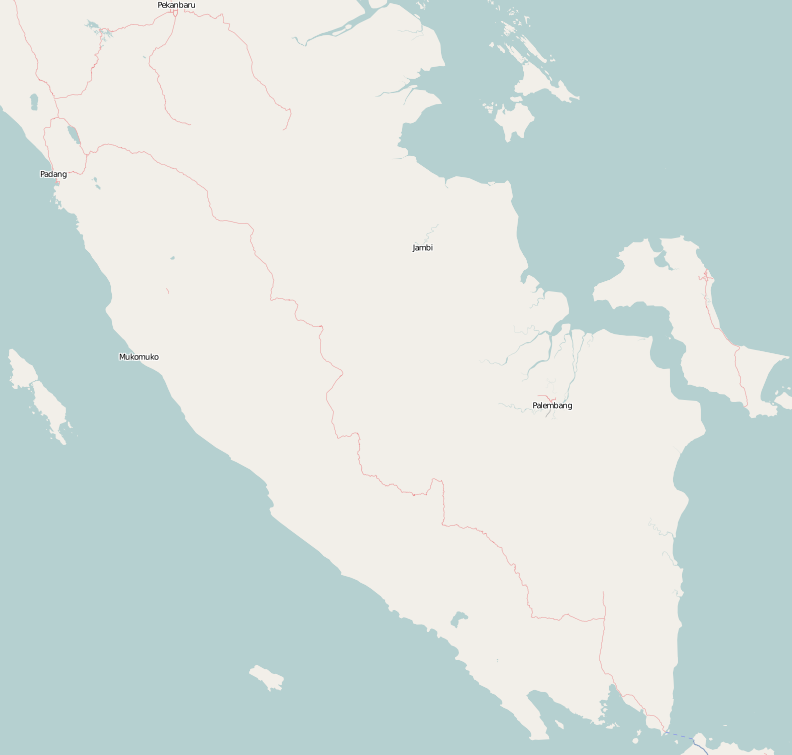
- Location within Southern Sumatra

Pulau Aie Station (PLA), also spelled by its old name Puluaer Station or in Malay as Pulau Air Station, is a class-I railway station located in Pasa Gadang, Padang Selatan, Padang, West Sumatra, Indonesia. It is the first railway station built in the city, situated quite close to the historic old town of Padang. Located at the altitude of +2 m, it is operated by the Regional Division II West Sumatra of Kereta Api Indonesia as a part of railway line reactivation throughout West Sumatra. It has two railway tracks with original line continues southwest to the old port of Muaro, but the line is not reactivated. Since 2007, the government of Padang City officially designated the station as a cultural property.

The station was opened in 1891, closed in the 1980s, and reopened in 2021. Currently it serves as the terminal station of Minangkabau Express for Minangkabau International Airport.

== Services ==
- Minangkabau Express, to Minangkabau International Airport

== Gallery ==
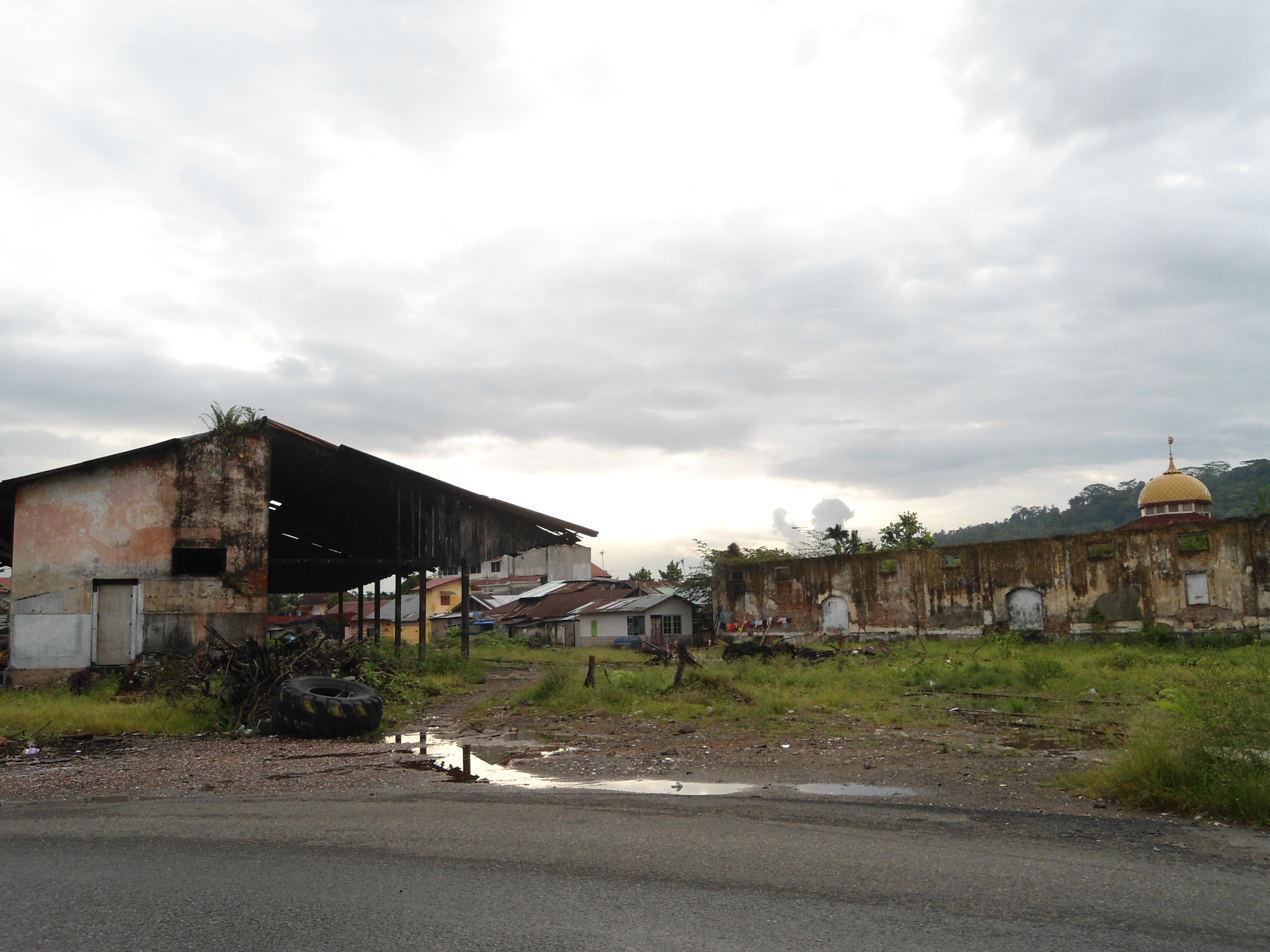
Pulau Aie Station before renovation, 2014

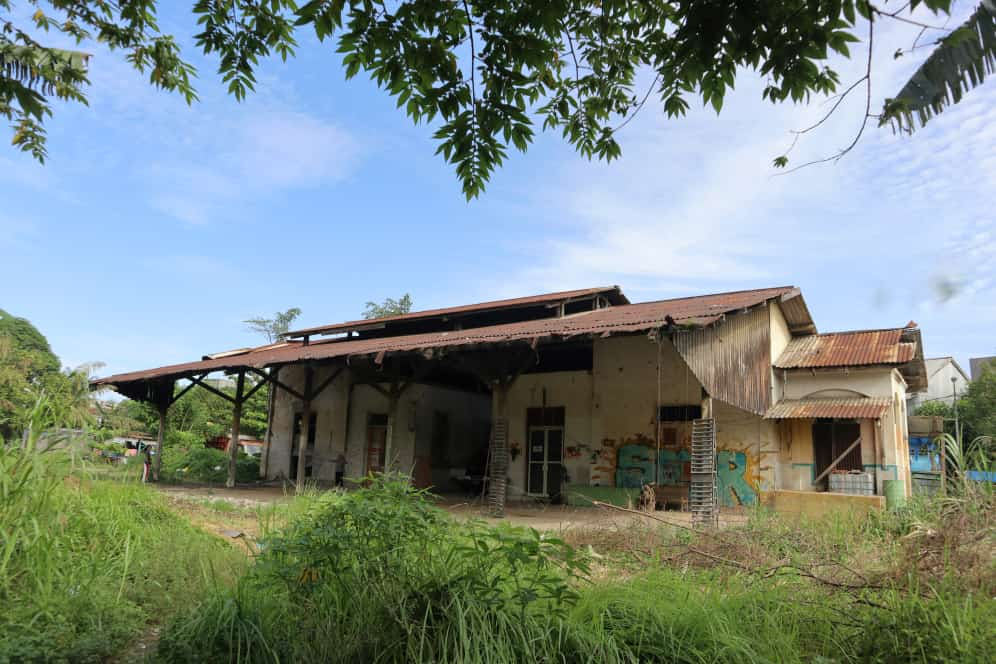
Pulau Aie Station before renovation, 2019

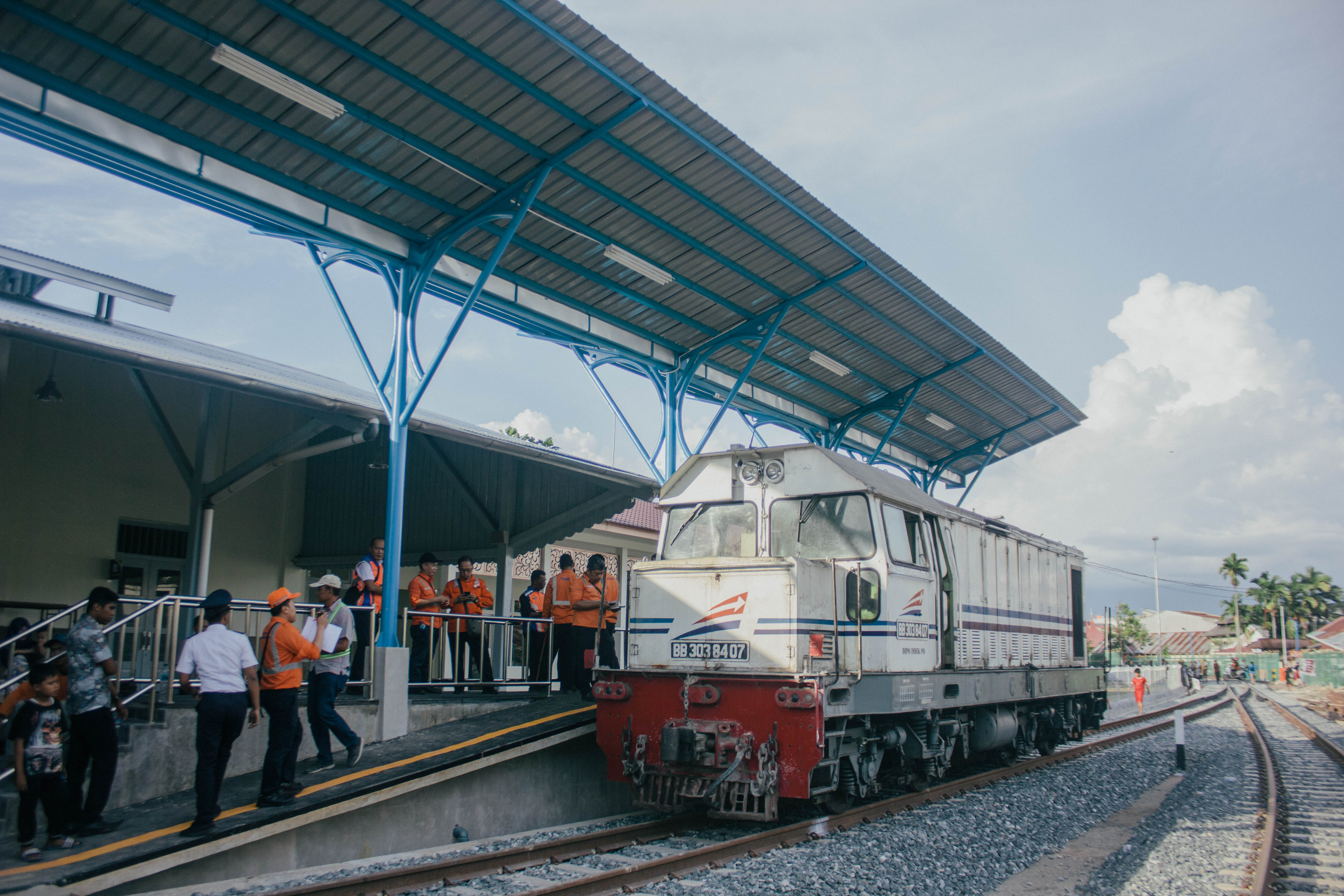
Reactivated track testing at Pulau Aie Station, March 2020

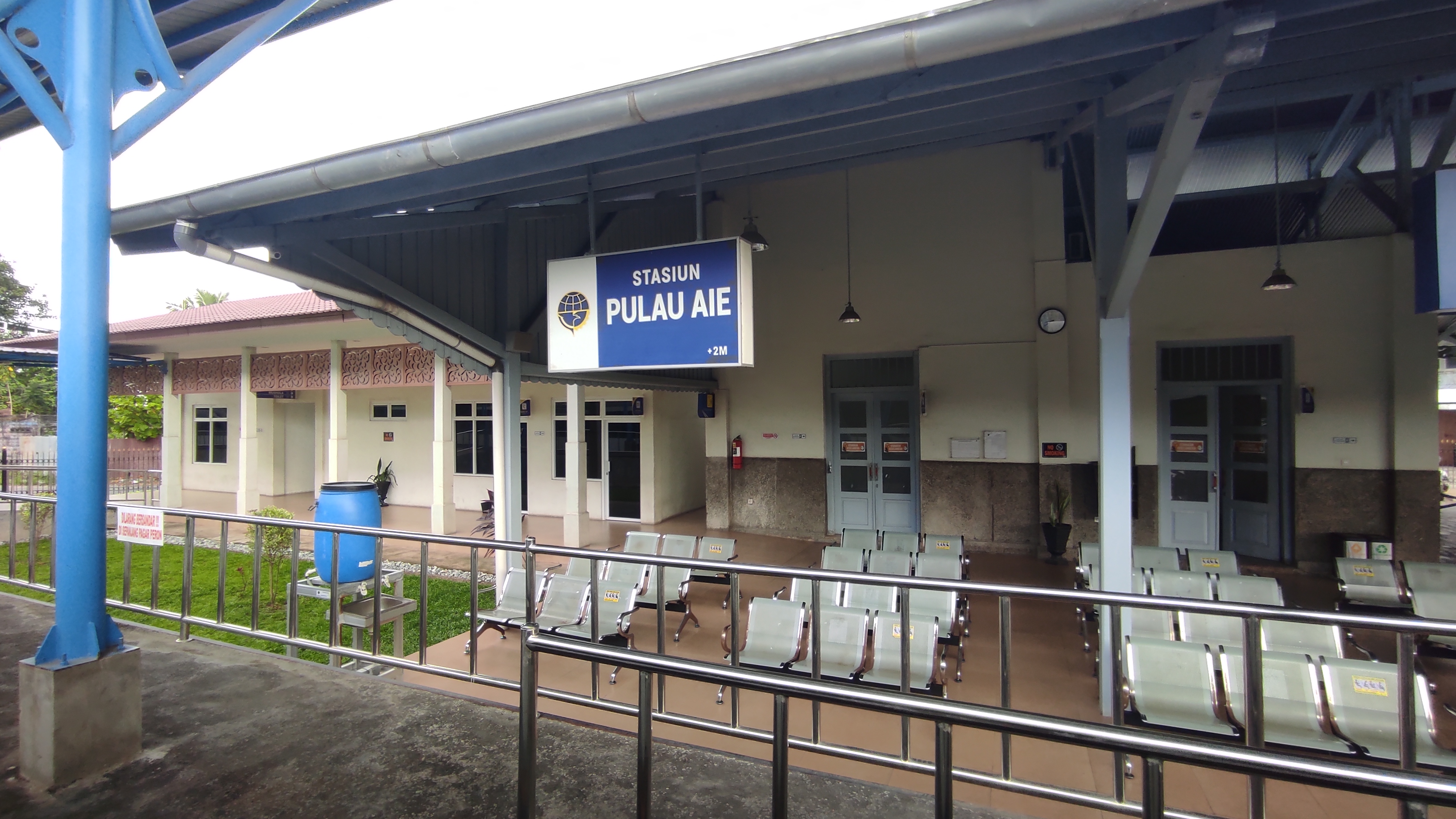
The station platform in 2022

Preceding station	Kereta Api Indonesia	Following station
Terminus	Pulau Aie–Padang Panjang	Tarandam towards Padang Panjang
