= List of populated places in North Sumatra =

This is a list of populated places in North Sumatra, with their type.

Name	Type
Aek Kanopan	Town
Arnhemia	Town
Bahal	Village
Balige	Town
Berastagi	Town
Berastagi	Town
Binjai	City
Boho	Village
Bukit Lawang	Village
Bunuraja	Village
Dolok Sanggul	Town
Gunung Tua	Town
Gunungsitoli	City
Haranggaol	Area
Kabanjahe	Town
Kabanjahe	Town
Kisaran	Town
Kota Pinang	Town
Lahewa	Village
Limapuluh	Town
Lubuk Pakam	Town
Lumbandolok	Village
Medan	Capital
Natal	Town
Padangsidempuan	City
Pandan	Town
Pangkalan Brandan	Town
Pangururan	Town
Panyabungan	Town
Parapat	Town
Pematangsiantar	City
Percut Sei Tuan	Town
Rantau Prapat	Town
Raya, Simalungun	Town
Salak	Town
Sei Rempah	Town
Sibolangit	District
Sibuhuan	District
Sidikalang	Town
Sipirok	Town
Siraituruk	Village
Stabat	Town
Tanjungbalai	City
Tebing Tinggi	City
Timbang Langkat	Area

-
