= Boho =

Boho may refer to:

== Geography ==
- Boho, County Fermanagh, a village and parish in County Fermanagh, Northern Ireland
  - Boho Caves, a cave system in Boho
- Boho, North Sumatra, a village on the island of Samosir, Indonesia

== Other uses ==
- Boho, short for "Bohemian", see Bohemianism
- BoHo Theatre, the Bohemian Theatre Ensemble based in Chicago, Illinois
- Jade Boho (born 1986), Spanish-born Equatorial Guinean footballer
- Boho (TV series), a 2026 Belgian television series

== See also ==
- Boho-chic, a fashion style of the early 21st century
