= Timbang =

Timbang may refer to the following places:

- Timbang Island, island in the Malaysian state of Sabah
- Timbang Langkat, populated place in the Indonesian province of North Sumatra
