= Tanjungbalai railway station =

Railway station in Indonesia

Tanjungbalai railway station Stasiun Tanjungbalai

General information
- Coordinates: 2.9708°N 99.7998°E
- Elevation: +2.87m
- Owner: Kereta Api Indonesia
- Manager: Kereta Api Indonesia
- Platforms: one low side platform
- Tracks: 3

Construction
- Structure type: Ground
- Parking: Available

Other information
- Station code: TNB • 9600
- Classification: Medium type B

History
- Opened: 1915
- Original company: Deli Spoorweg Maatschappij
Location

Tanjungbalai Station (TNB) (alternatively Tanjungbalai Station) is a medium type B railway station located in Tanjungbalai, North Sumatra, Indonesia. The station is located at an altitude of +2.87 meters and is operated by the Regional Division I Medan of Kereta Api Indonesia. The station served as last point for passenger trains heading for Medan Station in Medan.

== Services ==
The following is a list of train services at the Tanjungbalai Station

=== Passenger services ===
- Economy class
  - Putri Deli to Medan
