= Kualanamu Airport Rail Link =

Railway service in Indonesia

Kualanamu Airport Raillink Services (ARS)
- A

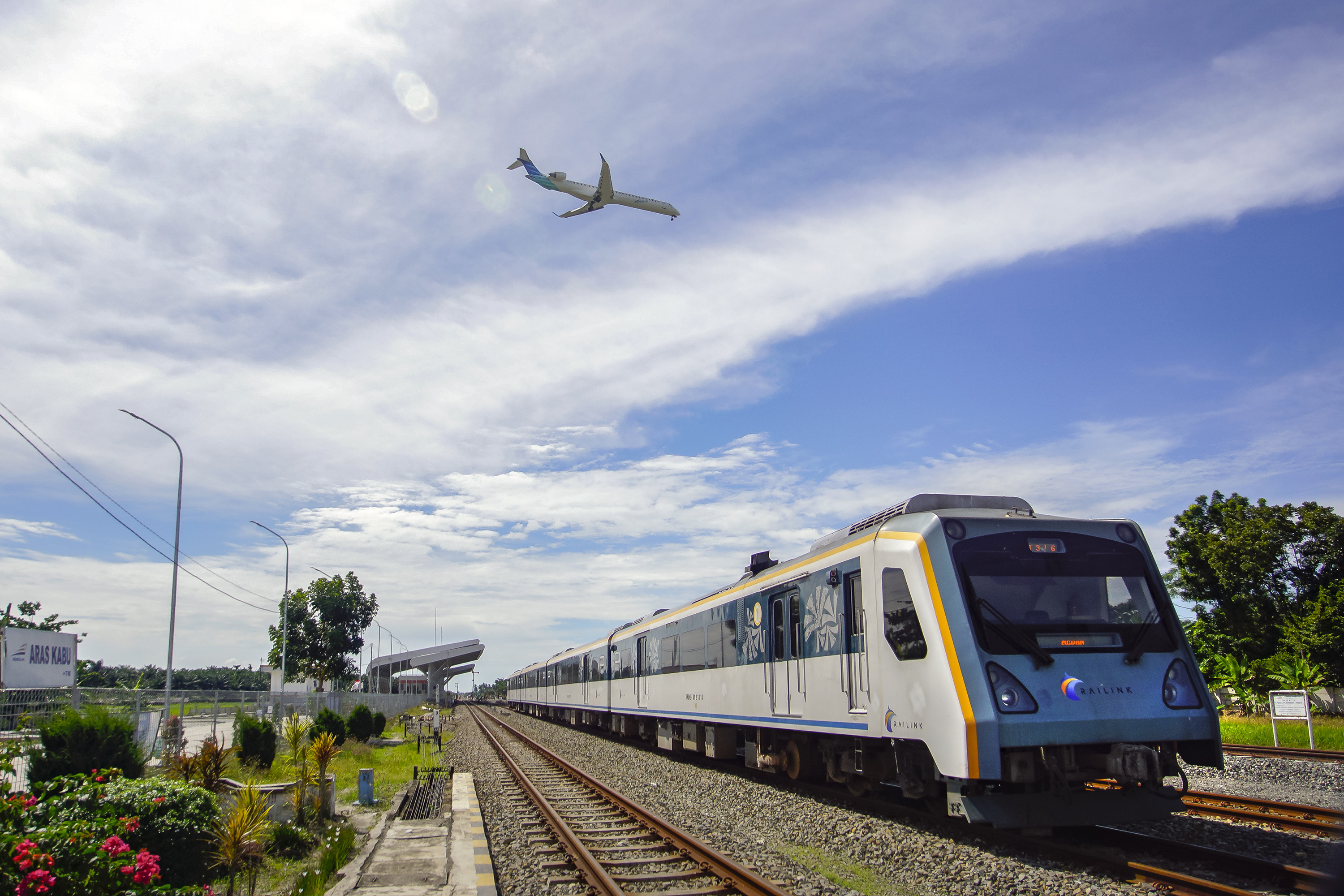
- Kualanamu ARS DEMU towards the airport near Araskabu station

Overview
- Native name: KA Bandara Kualanamu
- Status: in service
- Owner: PT Kereta Api Indonesia & InJourney Airports
- Locale: North Sumatera, Indonesia
- Termini: Kualanamu; Medan
- Stations: 5 (operational)
- Website: www.railink.co.id

Service
- Type: Express rail
- System: Airport rail link
- Services: Kualanamu - Araskabu - Batang Kuis - Bandar Khalipah - Medan
- Operator: PT Railink
- Rolling stock: Woojin DEMU; Four 4-carriage trainsets
- Daily ridership: 1.5 million (2025) (Annual)

History
- Opened: 25 July 2013; 13 years ago

Technical
- Line length: 40 km (25 mi)
- Character: Ground, and elevated
- Track gauge: 1,067 mm (3 ft 6 in)
- Electrification: None
- Operating speed: 60 km/h (37 mph)

Kualanamu Airport Railink Services (ARS) (Indonesian: KA Bandara Kualanamu) is an airport rail link service in Medan in North Sumatra, Indonesia. The rail link was built to cut travel time from Medan railway station to Kualanamu International Airport, as roads connecting the airport to Medan city center are frequently affected by traffic congestion.

The Kualanamu ARS is the first airport rail link in Indonesia to connect passengers between the city centre and airport.

== Background ==
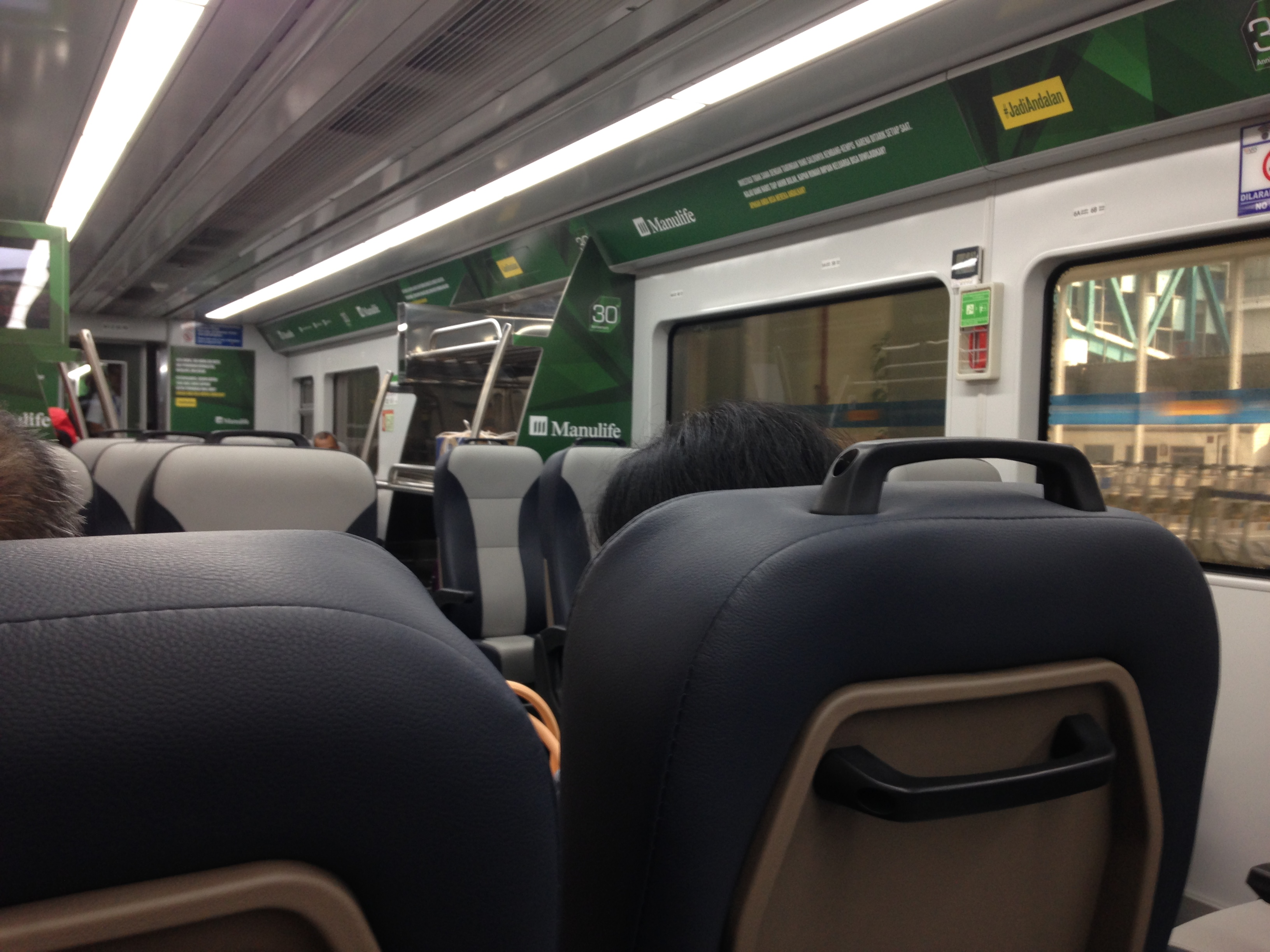
Interior of Woojin DEMU for Kualanamu ARS

Train services is provided by PT Railink, a joint venture between PT Angkasa Pura II and PT Kereta Api Indonesia. It is the first integrated airport rail link in Indonesia, city check-in and electronic tickets are also available for convenience. The trains were manufactured by Woojin Industrial Systems in South Korea.

Elevated tracks running from Medan Station to Araskabu Station started operating on 1 December 2019. From 28 September 2022, train services began making brief stops at Bandar Khalipah Station.

== Stations ==
Station	Transfer/Notes	Location
Medan	Terminal station Intercity trains S Sri Lelawangsa	Medan
Bandar Khalipah	Intercity trains	Deli Serdang Regency
Kualanamu International Airport	Terminal station Kualanamu International Airport	Deli Serdang Regency

== See also ==
- Soekarno–Hatta Airport Rail Link
- Minangkabau Airport Rail Link
- Adisumarmo Airport Rail Link
- Medan metropolitan area
