= Medan railway station =

Railway station in Indonesia

A01 Medan Station Stasiun Medan
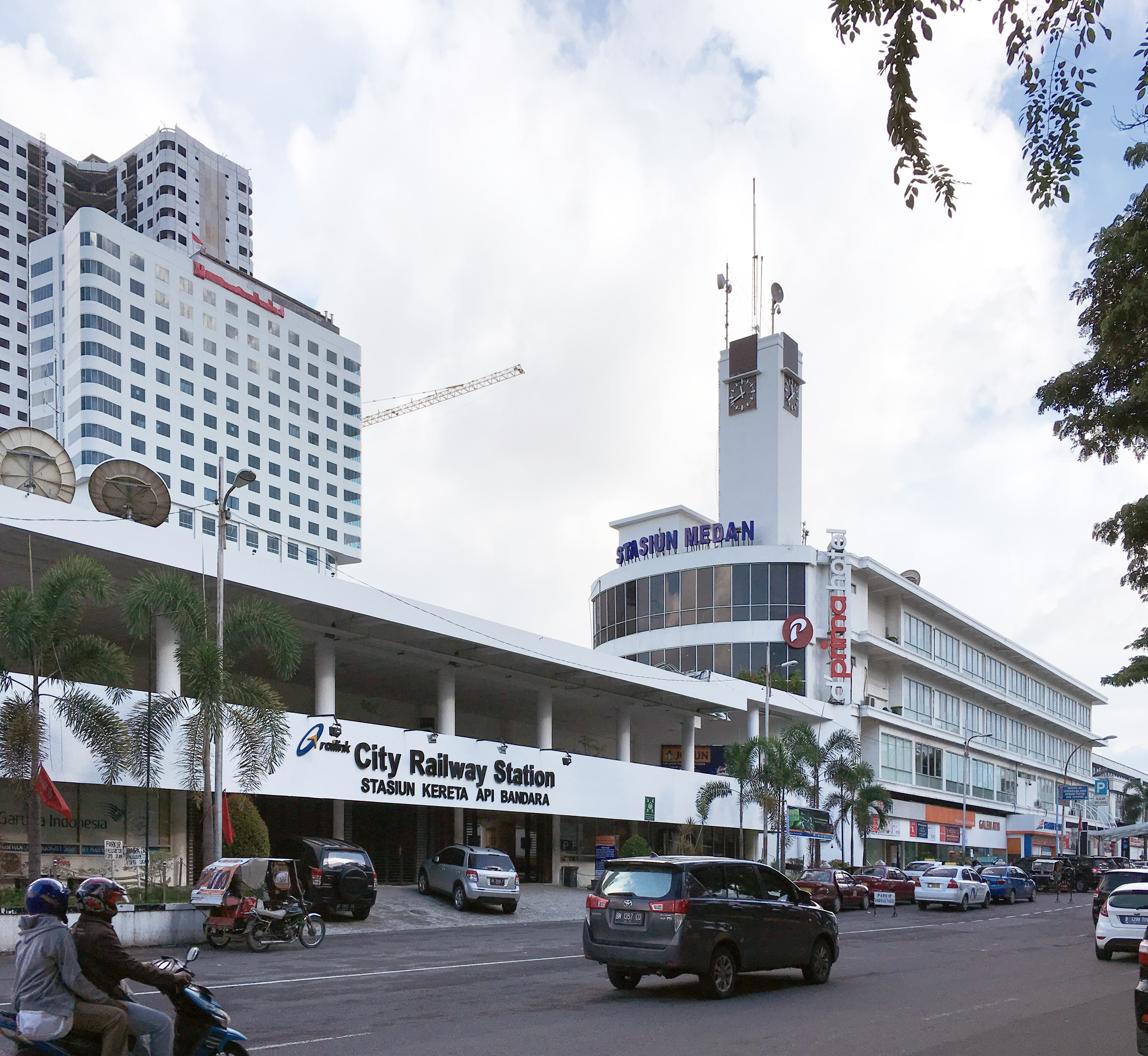
- The exterior view of Medan Station

General information
- Location: Medan; North Sumatra; Indonesia
- Coordinates: 3°35′27″N 98°40′47″E
- Elevation: +22 m (72 ft)
- Owner: Kereta Api Indonesia
- Operator: Kereta Api Indonesia; KAI Bandara
- Lines: A Kualanamu Airport Rail Link; Sri Lelawangsa; Belawan–Medan; Besitang–Medan; Medan–Tebing Tinggi
- Platforms: 2 side platforms 2 island platforms
- Tracks: 7
- Connections: Trans Metro Deli: 1 2 3 4 5; Trans Mebidang: 1

Construction
- Structure type: Ground
- Platform levels: 2
- Parking: Available
- Cycle facilities: Bicycle parking
- Accessible: Available

Other information
- Station code: MDN • 9300
- Classification: Large class type A

History
- Opened: 25 July 1886; 140 years ago
- Rebuilt: 2013
- Original company: Deli Spoorweg Maatschappij

Services
Preceding station	Kereta Api Indonesia	Following station
Terminus	Sri Lelawangsa	Binjai towards Kuala Bingai
Preceding station		Following station
Terminus	Kualanamu Line	Bandar Khalipah towards Kualanamu International Airport
Location
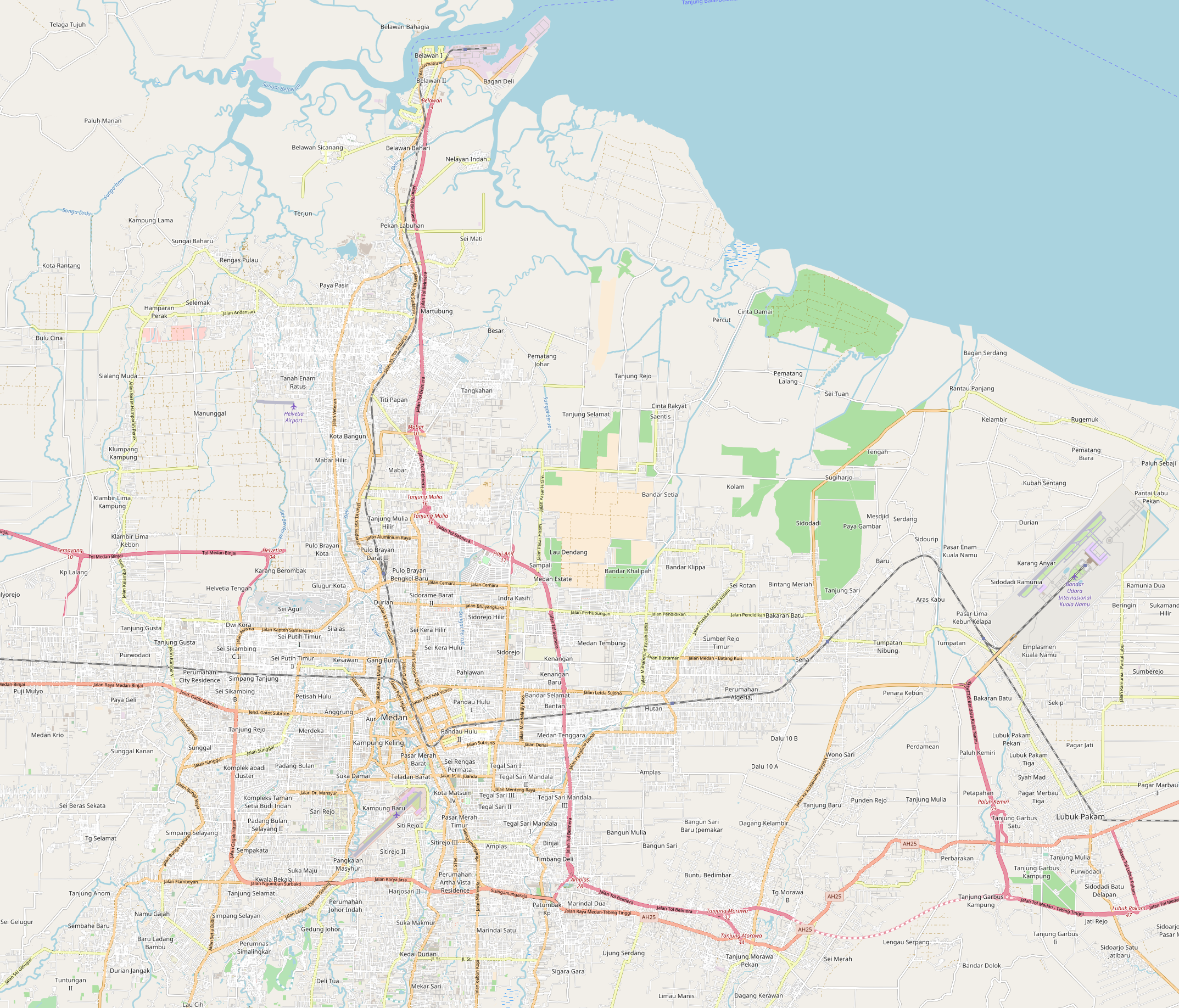
- Location within Medan

Medan Station is the main railway station in Medan, North Sumatra, Indonesia. In addition to intercity services operated by Indonesia's national rail operator, Kereta Api Indonesia, the station also has service to Kualanamu International Airport via Kualanamu Airport Rail Link.

== History ==
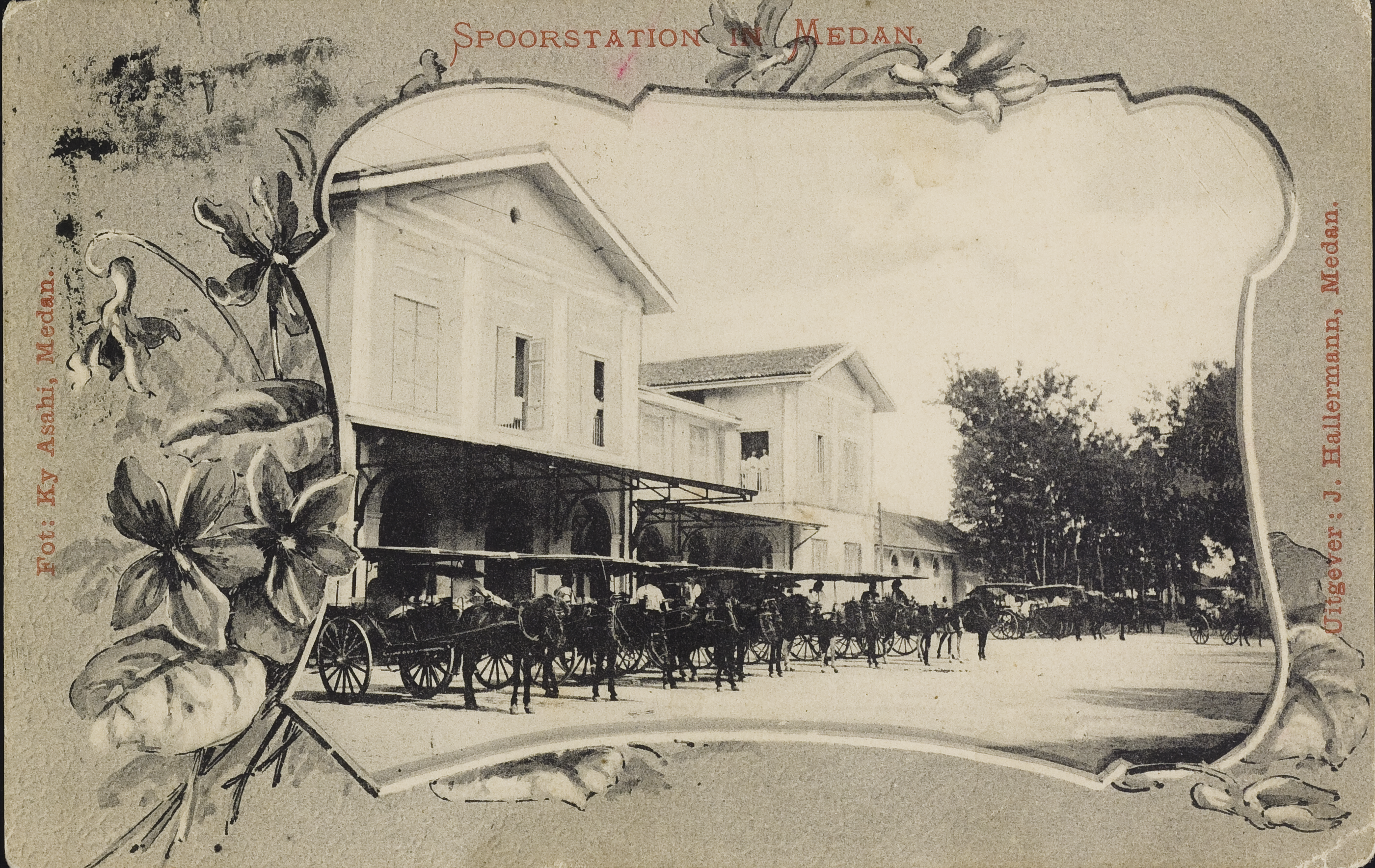
Medan Station, c. 1907.

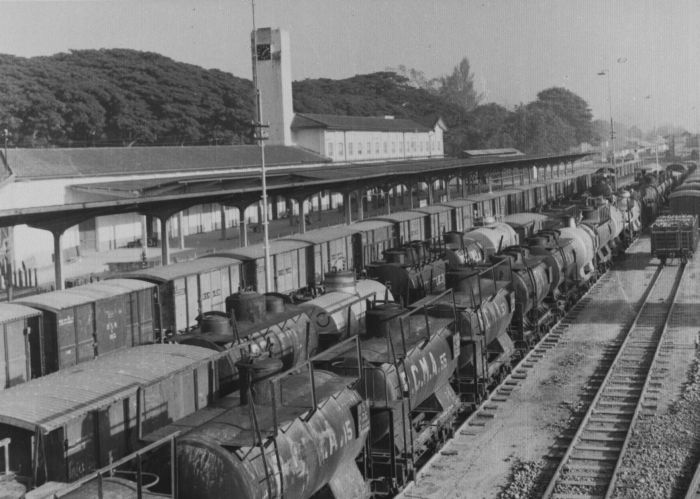
Main station of Medan, c. 1920.

Medan Station was officially opened on 25 July 1886 by Deli Spoorweg Maatschappij. At that time there was a 16.7 kilometer line connecting Medan Station and Labuhan Station. The line connects the city center of Medan to Port of Belawan. The rail line continued from Labuhan Station to Belawan Station which was inaugurated on 16 February 1888 and once served the Medan–Aceh route (Atjeh Stoomtram Staatspoorwegen).

Medan Station architecture has undergone a complete overhaul from the original form. Until now this station has undergone several renovations. The last major renovation was carried out in 2013 with the construction of a new building for the airport train (as the City Railway Station) as well as a revamp of the design of the existing building for regional train services. The only remainings of the old station on the current building complex is a clock tower in front of the station, a Dutch-style locomotive depot, the platform roof that houses lanes 2 and 3, and a suspension bridge at the station's southern end. This station also has an overpass (towards Pulu Brayan and Bandar Khalipah) whose construction began in 2016.

== Building and layout ==
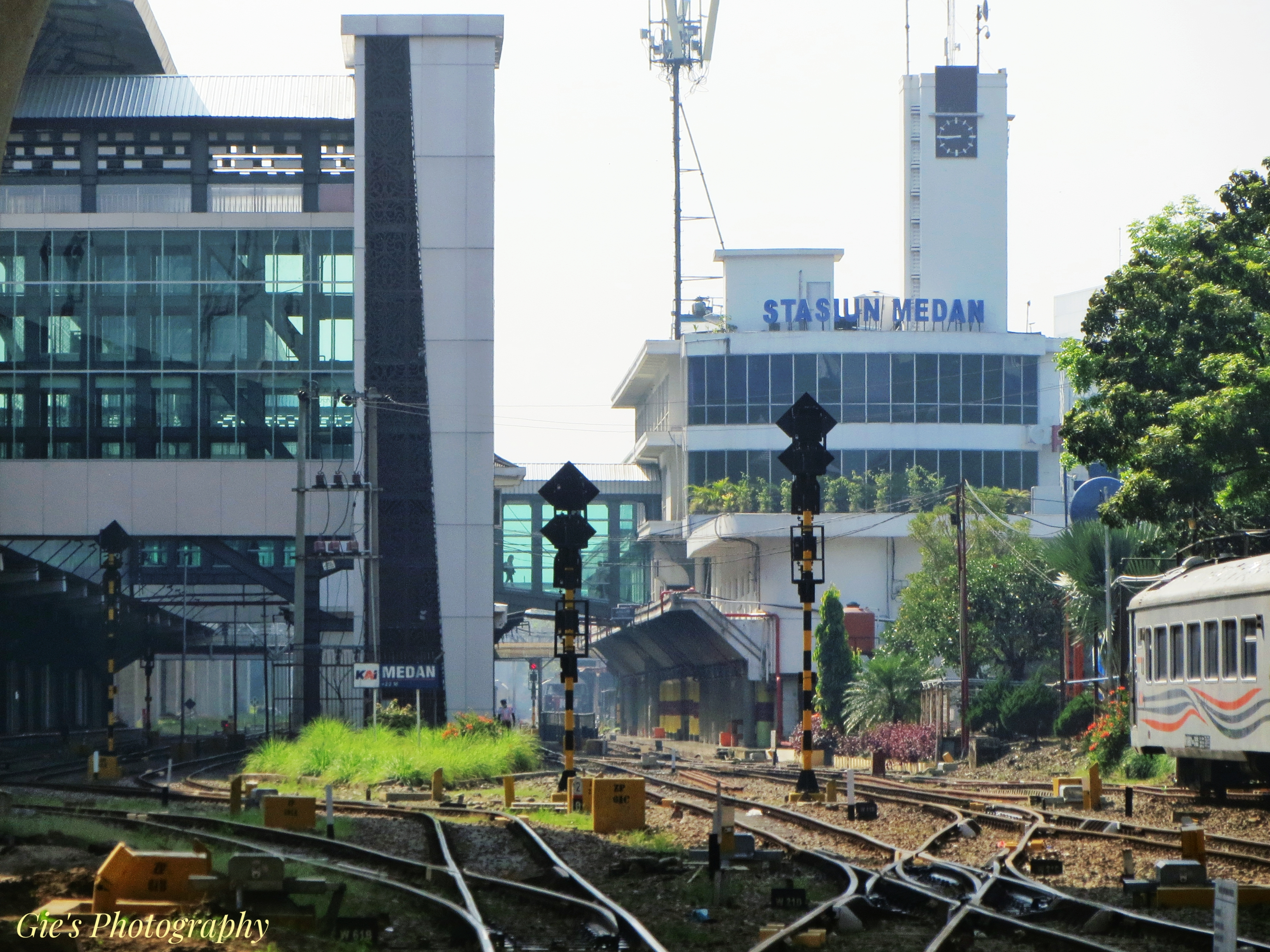
The old building (right) and the new building (left) of Medan Station

Medan station originally had nine train lines with line 1 being a straight line from Binjai, while line 2 is a straight track going to and from Pulu Brayan–Belawan. When a new elevated rail was built that took up lines 6 and 7, the number of lines for this train station was automatically reduced to seven. As soon as this new elevated rail project was completed, the number of tracks returned to nine with 2 lanes at the top. In addition, the old electrical signaling system (type GL1) has been replaced with the newest one produced by PT Len Industri.

== Services ==
Passenger trains that use this station are:

- Kualanamu ARS to Kualanamu
- Sribilah to Rantau Prapat
- Putri Deli to Tanjungbalai
- Siantar Express to Siantar
- Sri Lelawangsa to Binjai and Kuala Bingai

== Supporting transportation ==
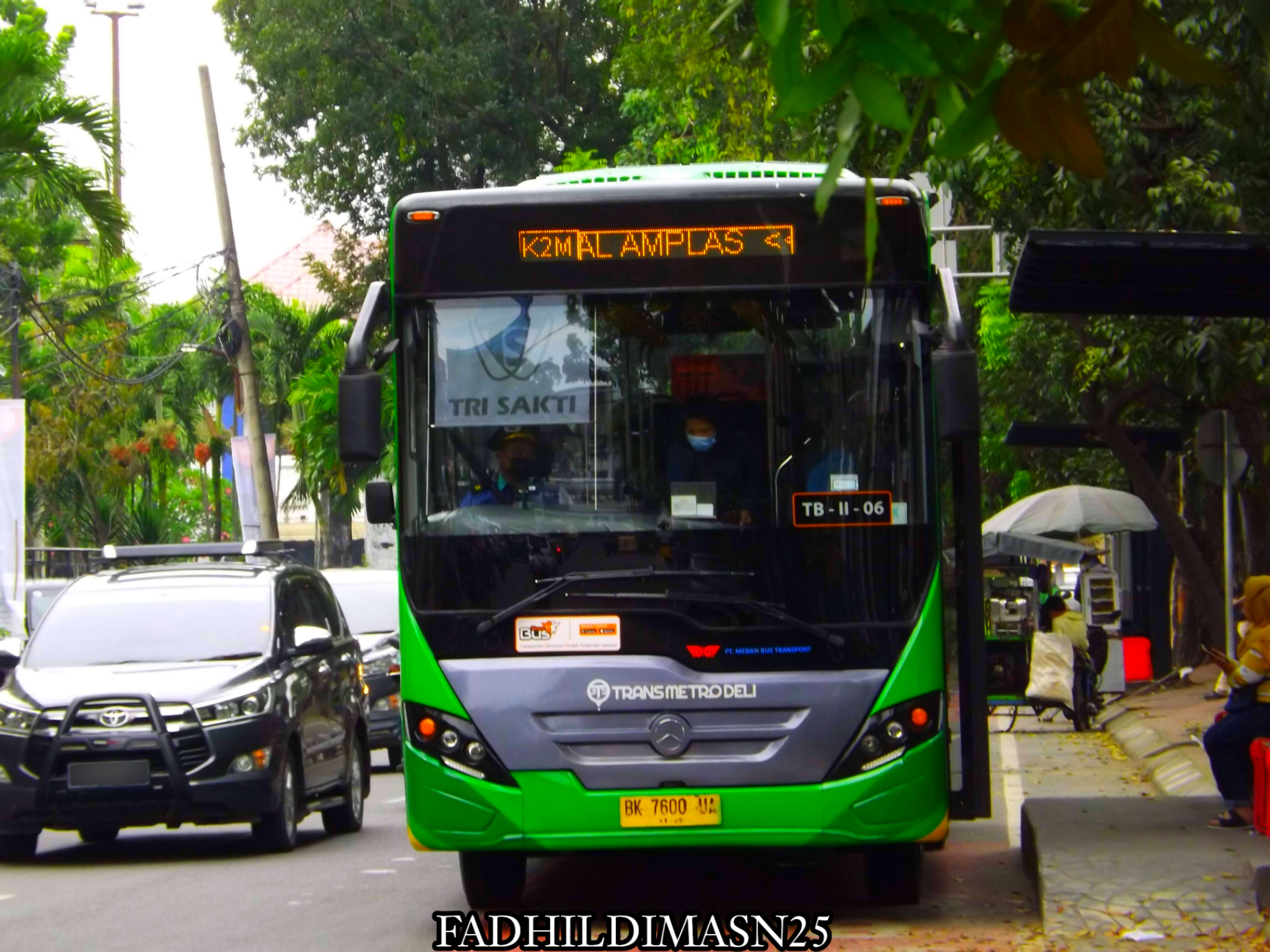
Trans Metro Deli bus fleet near Medan Station

As of 2022, Medan Station is connected to all five corridors of Trans Metro Deli BRT and Corridor 1 of Trans Mebidang BRT.

Public transportation type	Route	Destination
Trans Mebidang	M1	Binjai City Bus Terminal–Pusat Pasar (Medan)
Trans Metro Deli	1	Pinang Baris Bus Terminal–Lapangan Merdeka
Trans Metro Deli	2	Amplas Integrated Terminal–Lapangan Merdeka
Trans Metro Deli	3	Belawan–Lapangan Merdeka
Trans Metro Deli	4	Medan Tuntungan–Lapangan Merdeka
Trans Metro Deli	5	Medan Tembung–Lapangan Merdeka

Preceding station	Kereta Api Indonesia	Following station
Pulu Brayan towards Belawan	Belawan–Medan	Terminus
Binjai towards Besitang	Besitang–Medan	Terminus
Terminus	Medan–Tebing Tinggi	Medan Pasar towards Tebing Tinggi
