= KNM =

KNM may refer to:

- Kongelig Norsk Marine, Royal Norwegian Navy ship prefix
- Koninklijke Nederlandse Munt, Royal Dutch Mint, mint of the Netherlands
- Kerala Nadvathul Mujahideen, a Salafi movement in India
- Kualanamu International Airport railway station, Indonesia, station code
- Kunsill Nazzjonali tal-Ilsien Malti, language regulator of Maltese
