= Binjai railway station =

Railway station in Indonesia

Binjai Station Stasiun Binjai
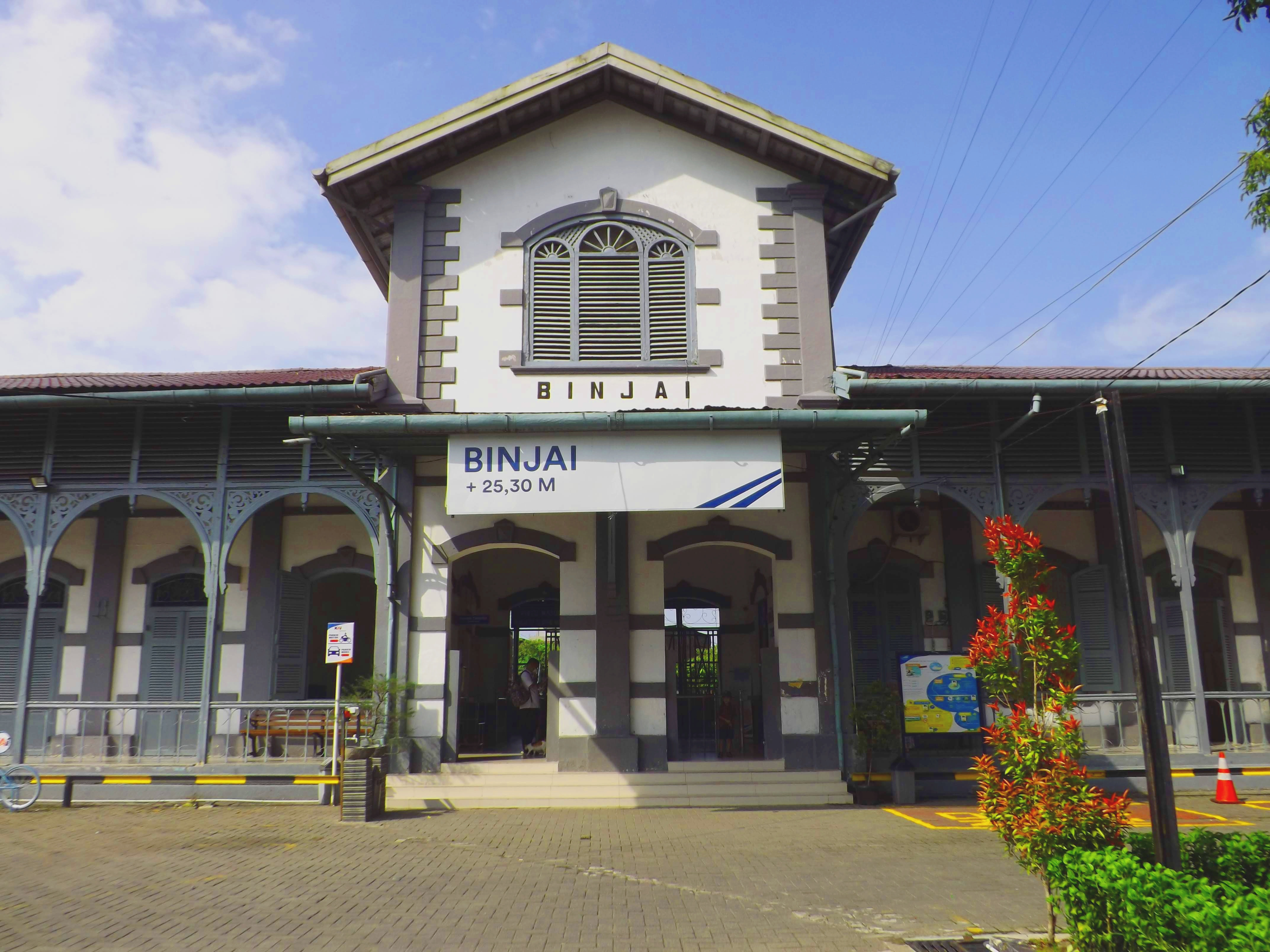
- Front view of Binjai Station

General information
- Location: Binjai; North Sumatra; Indonesia
- Coordinates: 3°36′35″N 98°29′52″E
- Elevation: +29.30 m (96.1 ft)
- Owner: Kereta Api Indonesia
- Operator: Kereta Api Indonesia
- Lines: Sri Lelawangsa; Besitang–Medan }}
- Platforms: 2
- Tracks: 3
- Connections: Trans Mebidang: 1

Construction
- Structure type: Ground
- Parking: Available
- Cycle facilities: Bicycle parking
- Accessible: Available
- Architectural style: Indische Empire DSM

Other information
- Station code: BIJ • 8815
- Classification: Class II

History
- Former names: Timbang Langkat Station

Passengers
- 2016: 710,516

Services
Preceding station	Kereta Api Indonesia	Following station
Medan Terminus	Sri Lelawangsa	Kuala Bingai Terminus
Location
- Location within Northern Sumatra

Binjai Station, (BIJ)—formerly known as Timbang Langkat Station—is railway station located in Binjai, Indonesia, in the area near Binjai Bus station. The station is located at an elevation of +29.30 m (96.1 ft), and is situated in the Regional Division Railway I North Sumatra and Aceh. Unlike most other stations in North Sumatra which have different architecture, Binjai station remains a colonial-style building from the time of its first construction.

== History ==
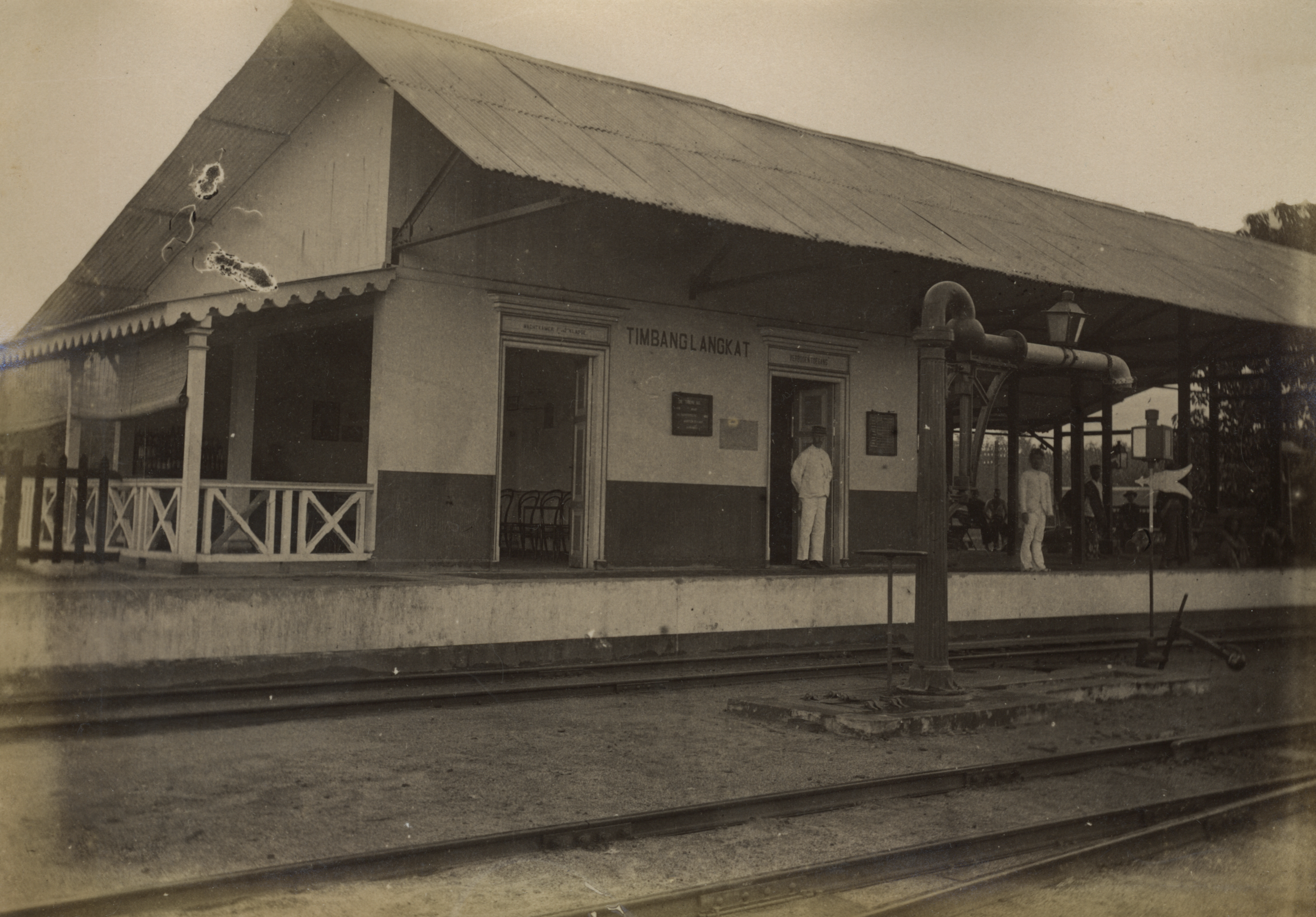
The first generation of Timbang Langkat Station

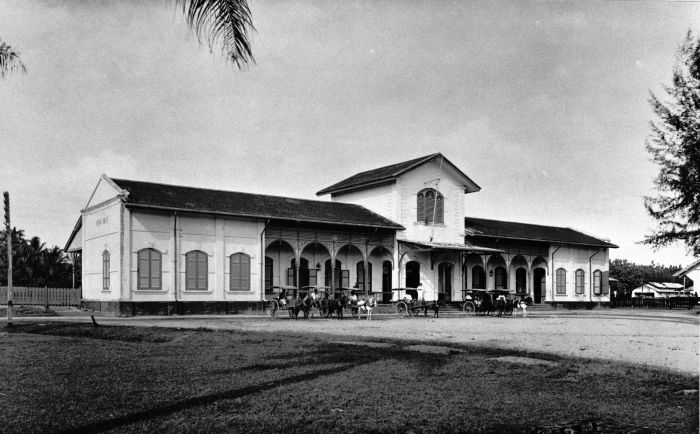
Front side of Binjai station, formerly known as Timbang Langkat Station.

Binjai station has no rail service towards Besitang because this railroad was closed. In addition, the station no longer serves for the transportation of goods. In 2016, there were plans to reactivate the railway to connect Medan to Banda Aceh; it was expected to be operational in 2017. In the past, there were four stations between Medan: Binjai, namely as Sikambing, Sunggal, Sungai Semayang, and Diski station.

Previously, Binjai station had crossroads between Besitang and Kuala. But the railway to Kuala remains only in traces now.

== Building and layout ==
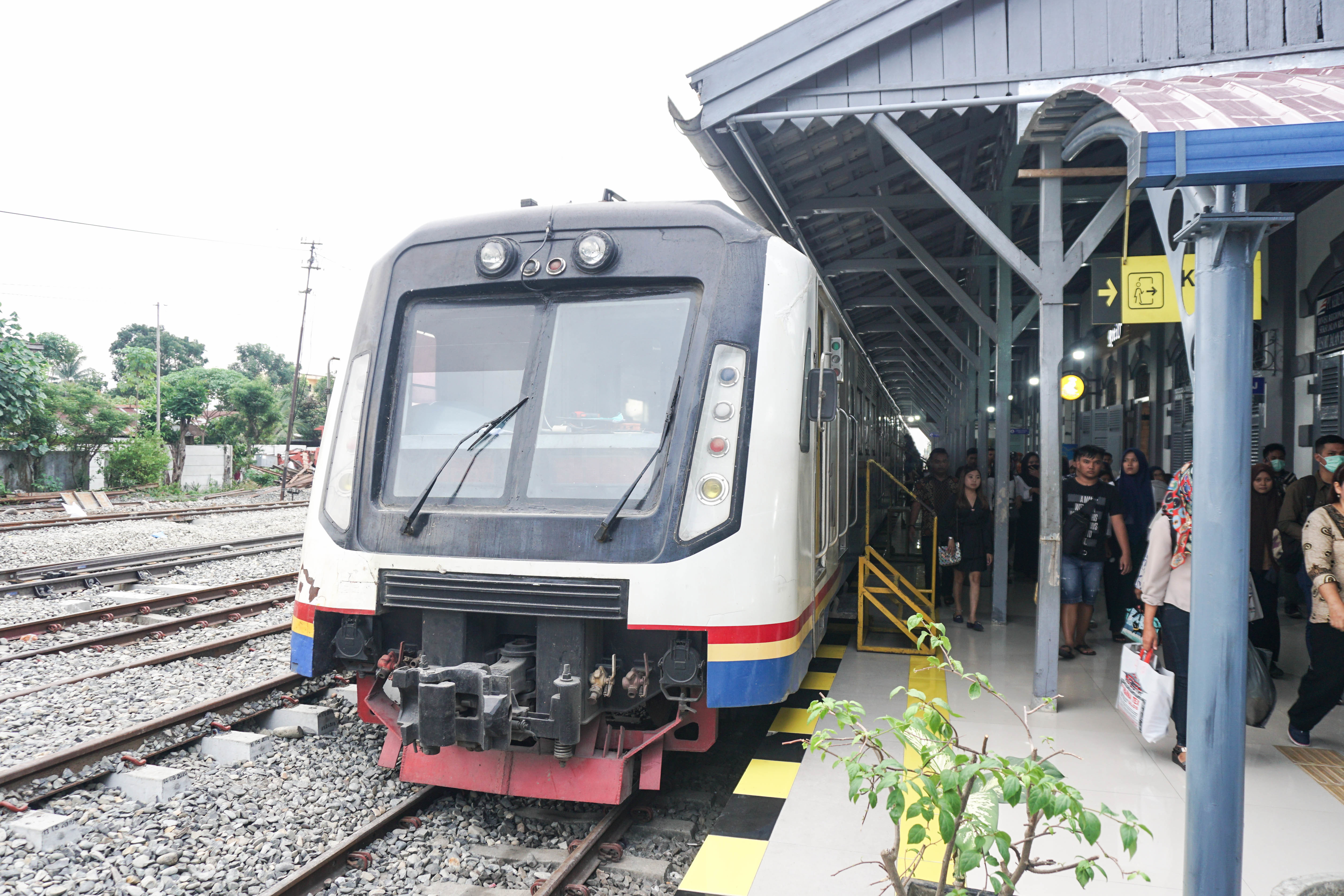
Sri Lelawangsa train at the station platform

Binjai station used to have six railway tracks, but nowadays only 3 tracks remain. At the north end of the station, there is a water tower, and there are also still two water cranes remaining for steam locomotives in the far north and south of the station.

At late 2020, the mechanical signaling system at this station has been replaced with an electrical signaling system produced by Len Industri.

== Services ==
- Sri Lelawangsa to Medan and Kuala Bingai

== Supporting transportation ==
Public transportation type	Route	Destination
Trans Mebidang	M1	Binjai City Bus Terminal–Pusat Pasar (Medan)

== Gallery ==
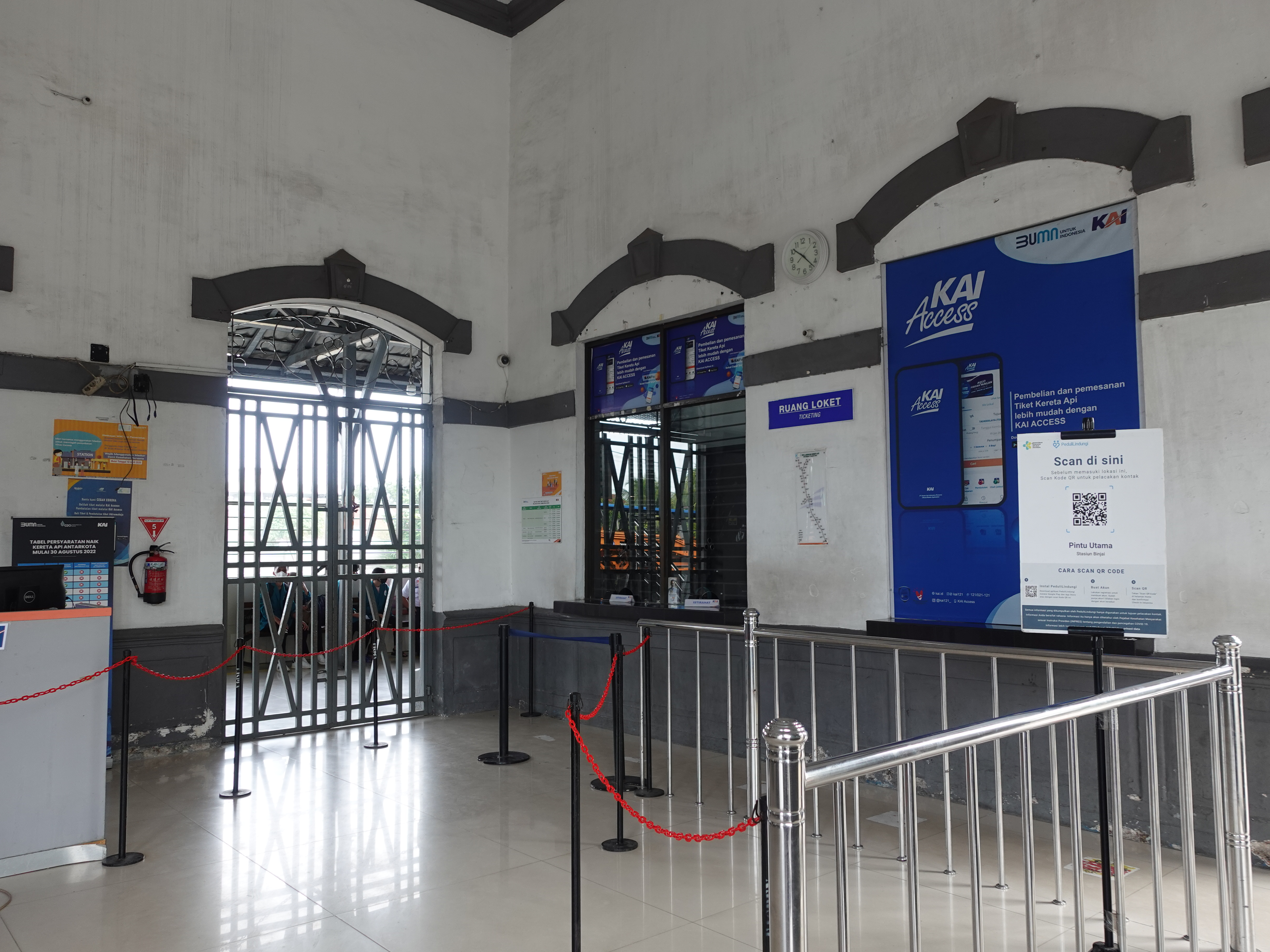
The waiting room of the station

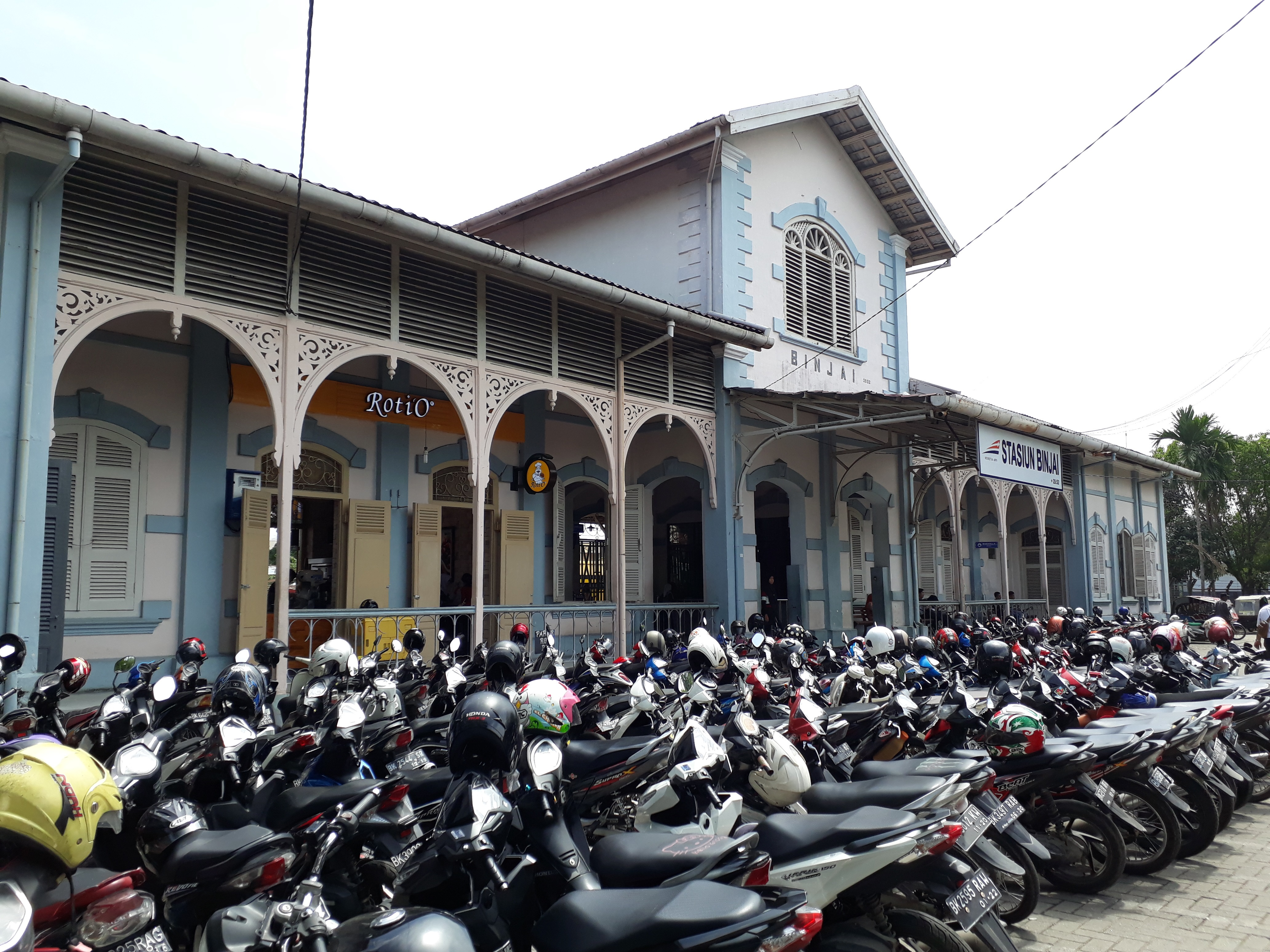
The front view of the station, 2017

Preceding station	Kereta Api Indonesia	Following station
Kuala Begumit towards Besitang	Besitang–Medan	Diski from Medan
