= Timbang Langkat =

Coordinates: 3.6010°N 98.5030°E

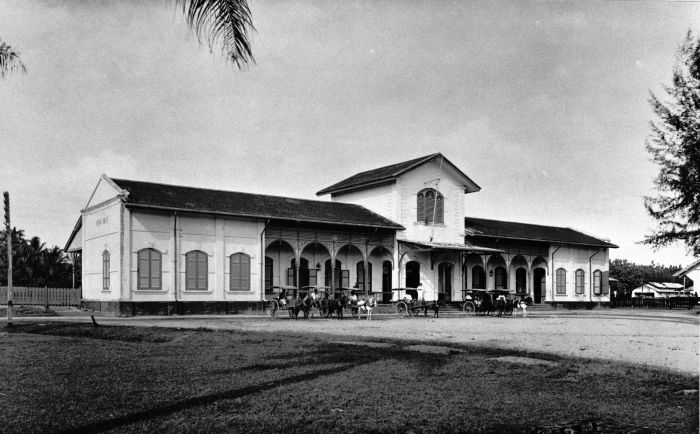
Timbang Langkat station on the Deli Railway (early 20th century)

Timbang Langkat is a village (kelurahan) in East Binjai, Binjai, North Sumatra, Indonesia. The postal code is 20 732.
