= Boho (TV series) =

2026 Belgian television series

- Genre: Comedy drama
- Created by: Abbie Boutkabout
- Written by: Abbie Boutkabout; Zita Theunynck; Philippe De Schepper
- Directed by: Olympia Allaert
- Starring: Serine Ayari; Ikram Aoulad; Miss Angel; Boris Van Severen
- Country of origin: Belgium
- Original language: Dutch

Production
- Production company: jonnydepony

Original release
- Network: Streamz
- Release: 10 February 2026

Boho is a Belgian short-form comedy drama television series created by Abbie Boutkabout and directed by Olympia Allaert. Set in Borgerhout, a district of Antwerp, it was released on Streamz in February 2026 and won the short-form competition at Canneseries later that year.

== Premise ==
The series follows three women in their thirties in Borgerhout: Kima, who loses her job and sets out to make a film; her sister Nawal; and their friend Alex.

== Cast ==
- Serine Ayari as Kima
- Ikram Aoulad as Nawal
- Miss Angel as Alex
- Boris Van Severen
- Ismaël L'Hamiti
- Khadija El Idrissi El Yacoubi
- Sabri Saad El-Hamus
- Lyna Lahbiri
- Zakaria Ridouani
- Slongs Dievanongs

== Production ==
The series was created and co-written by Abbie Boutkabout with Zita Theunynck and Philippe De Schepper, and directed by Olympia Allaert. It was produced by jonnydepony as a Streamz original.

== Release and awards ==
Boho premiered at the Ostend Film Festival on 3 February 2026 and was released on Streamz on 10 February, with a screening at the Roma cinema in Borgerhout on the same day.

Its first two episodes were shown in the official short-form competition at Canneseries in April 2026, where it won the prize for best short-form series.
