= Bunuraja =

Village in Sumatra, Indonesia

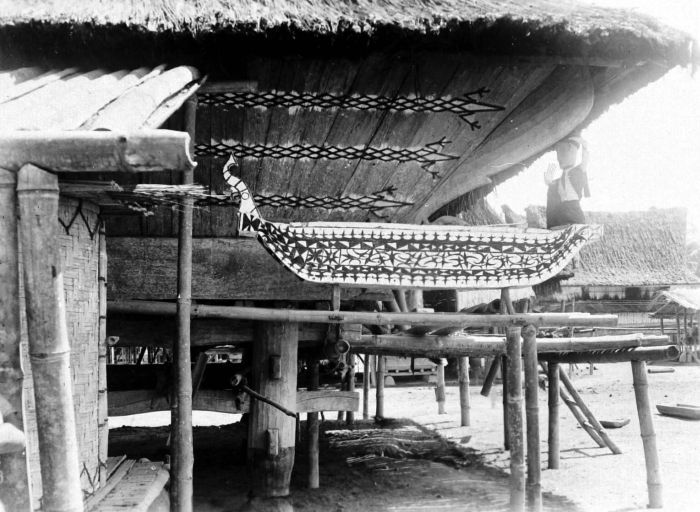
A Karo coffin in Bunuraja circa 1918, photo by Tassilo Adam

Bunuraja, Bunuraya, Bunu-raja is a village (kampong) in northern Sumatra, Indonesia.
