= Timbang Island =

Island in Malaysia

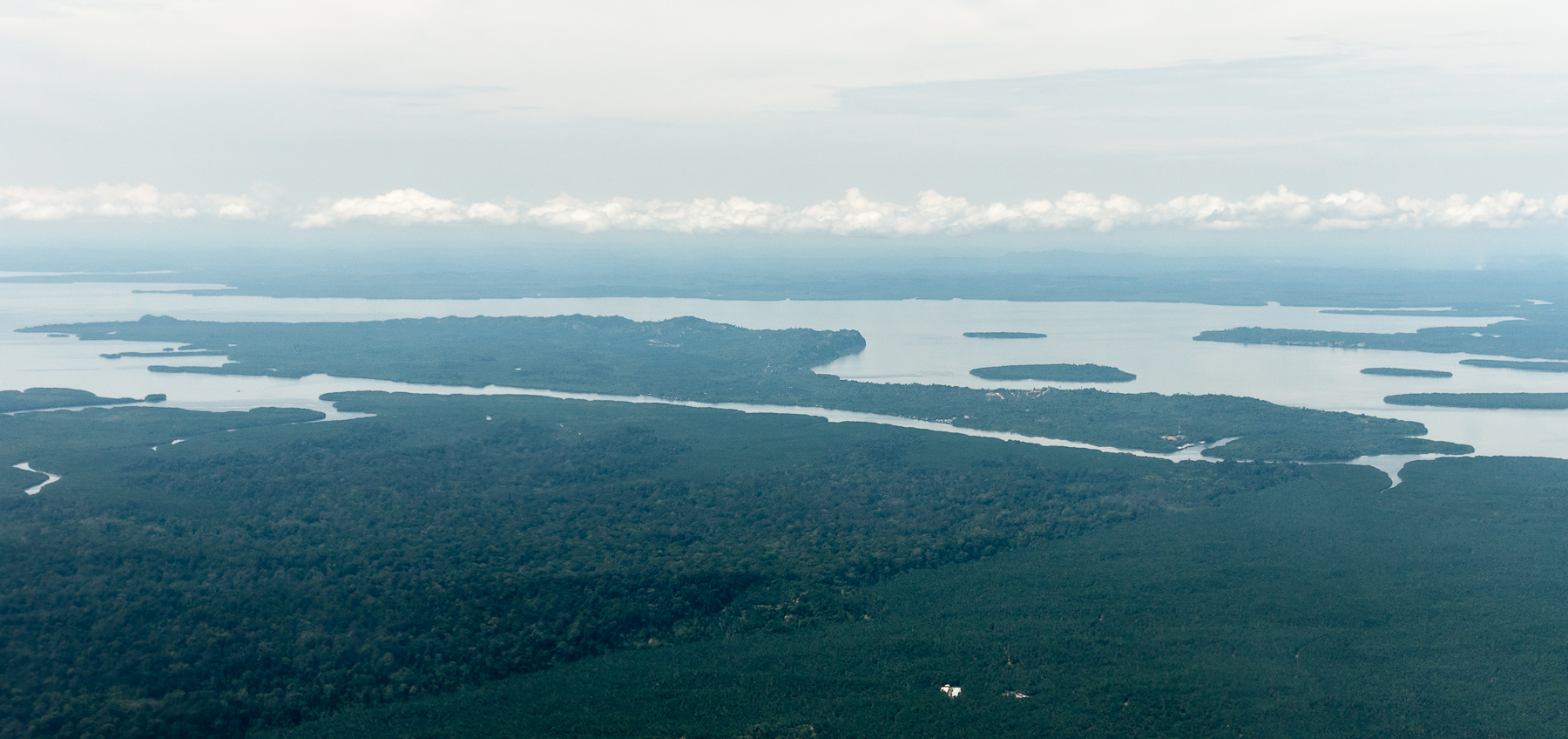
- View of Timbang Island
- Interactive map of Timbang Island

Geography
- Coordinates: 5°46′0″N 117°58′0″E

Administration
- Malaysia
- State: Sabah
- Division: Sandakan
- District: Sandakan

Timbang Island (Malay: Pulau Timbang) is a Malaysian island located in the Sulu Sea on the state of Sabah.

== See also ==
- List of islands of Malaysia
