= Kualanamu International Airport railway station =

Railway station in Indonesia

A03 Kualanamu International Airport Station Stasiun Bandara Kualanamu
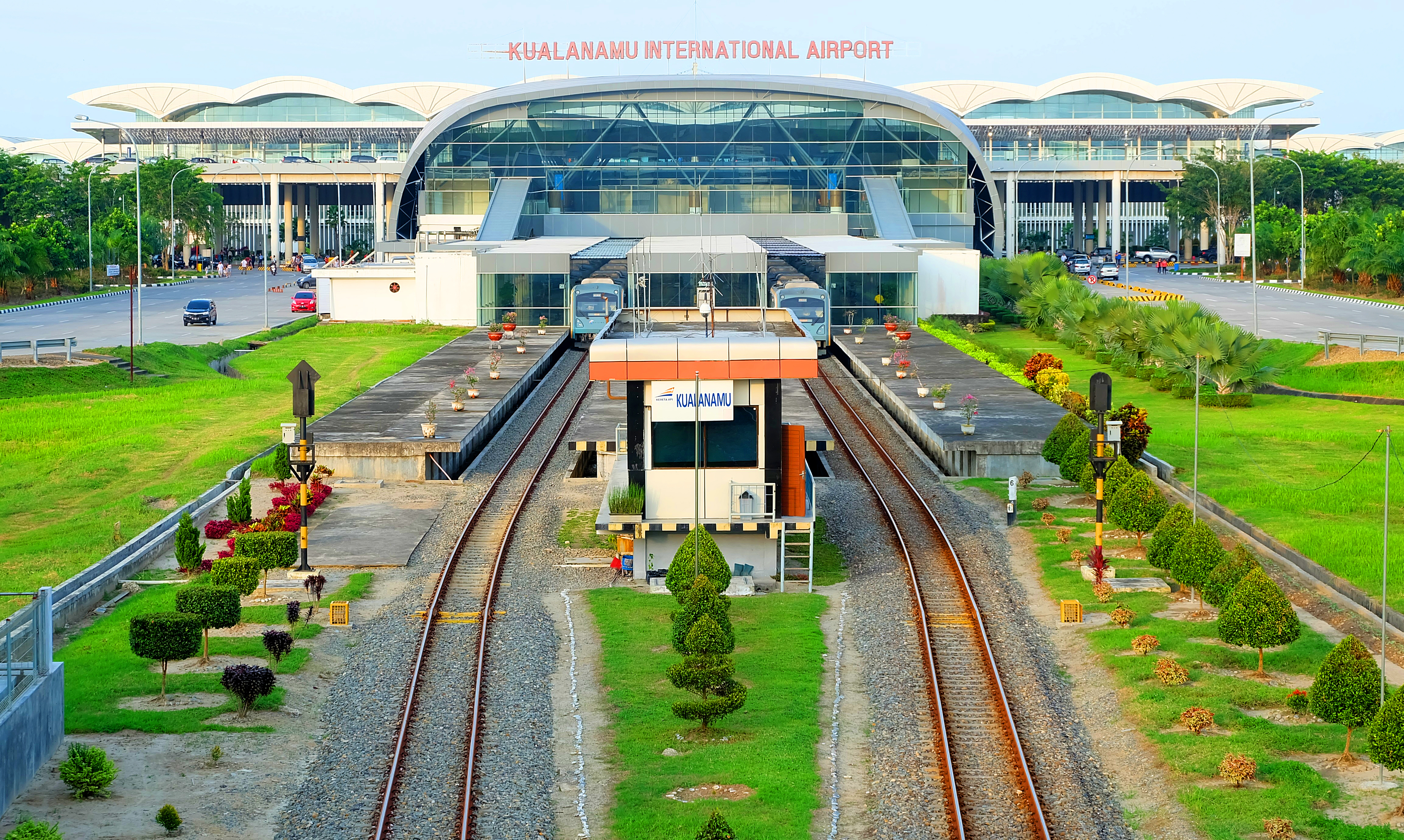
- Kualanamu International Airport Station, photo was taken on 10 October 2016

General information
- Location: Airport complex in Beringin, Deli Serdang Regency; North Sumatra; Indonesia
- Coordinates: 3°38′07″N 98°52′43″E
- Owner: Kereta Api Indonesia
- Operator: Railink
- Platforms: 1 island platform 2 side platforms
- Tracks: 2

Construction
- Structure type: Ground
- Parking: Available
- Accessible: Available

Other information
- Station code: KNM
- IATA code: KNO
- Classification: Large class type B

History
- Opened: 25 July 2013

Services
Preceding station		Following station
Bandar Khalipah towards Medan	Kualanamu Line	Terminus
Location
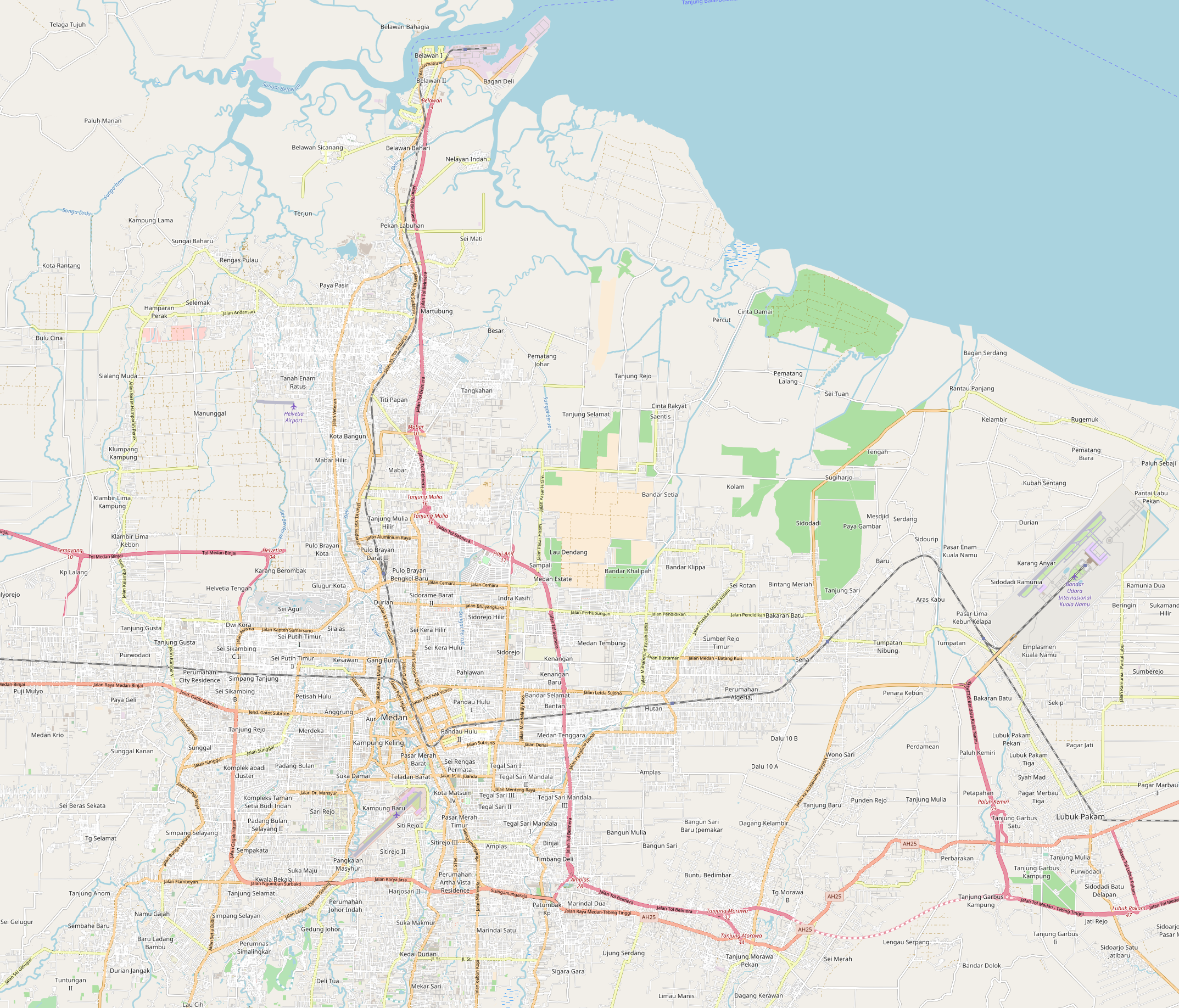
- Location within Medan

Kualanamu International Airport Station (KNM) is an airport railway station located in the Kualanamu International Airport complex, in Beringin, Beringin, Deli Serdang Regency, North Sumatra, Indonesia. The station is only about 50 meters from the airport building. This station is currently serving Kualanamu Airport Rail Link trips to Medan Station.

This station has only two tracks. However, the station is classified as a large class station, with the leadership of Kepala Stasiun Besar (KSB) (English: Main Station Chief), Vice-KSB and an aided dispatcher (Regulatory Train Journey). This station has three platforms, laid out in a Spanish solution layout - the outer Platforms 1 and 3 are used for passengers arriving from Medan, while the middle Platform 2 is used for passengers leaving for Medan Station. This station is operated by Railink, and is the first airport railway station in Indonesia.

== Services ==
The following is a list of train services at the Kualanamu International Airport Station.

=== Passenger services ===
- Airport Rail Link
  - Kualanamu Airport Rail Link, towards Medan

Preceding station	Kereta Api Indonesia	Following station
Araskabu; Terminus	ARB–KNM	Terminus
