= Siraituruk =

Village in Toba, Indonesia

Siraituruk is a village that lies on the Toba Highland in North Sumatra, Indonesia. It is inhabited by Toba Batak, mostly of the Sirait clan. Siraituruk is flanked by a river, the Aek Mandosi, which is divided into two waterways for paddy field irrigation. The Sirait clans are Sirait Sihahaan and Sirait Sianggian.

== Cultivations ==
There are paddy rice fields along the village. Paddies are cultivated and harvested once a year. After harvesting rice, villagers prepare the paddy field for fishery. There are many kinds of fish normally cultivated, the most common of which is a yellow-gold fish called ikan mas ("gold fish"). Gold fish is very popular around the village and also across the Toba Highland.

== Celebrations ==
Ikan mas is a compulsory part of the cuisine for Batak parties, including marriage celebrations. Such celebrations are full of cultural ceremony, such as giving some ulos (traditional Batak fabric, mostly hand-made) to the newly married couple with speeches for future prosperity and many good and healthy sons and daughters. Afterwards, the new married couple receive ikan mas cuisine, eaten while serving one another.

== Religion ==
Most of the Siraituruk population is strongly Christian. Villagers conduct religious activities throughout the year, including Sunday church services, as well as celebrating Christmason (Christmas), Good Friday, and Easter. Christmas is a very cheerful event in the village, with celebrations held in the village church. The church belongs to Huria Kristen Batak Protestan Church ("Huria Batak Protestant Christian Church"), the biggest Protestant church community in the country. Worshippers come from all walks of life, including groups of university students who study in the city of Medan, 200 km away.

From the first day of December, villagers celebrate the birthday of Jesus Christ with religious sermons in the church. Every night groups queue for the chance to celebrate Christmason in the church. The celebration includes singing Christmas songs written on Church song books, and also including popular Christian religious songs, listening to evangelical sermons, reading Bible verses, and sometimes dramas about the life of Jesus Christ. People wear newly bought clothes and shoes, especially children, who receive presents from their parents.

== Climate ==
Overall, the climate in Siraituruk is cool and pleasant. The village is surrounded by the Bukit Barisan mountains, which appear blue-green in color, full of tropical forests. Daylight hours are typically hot with low humidity, while evenings can be biting cold, especially in the windy season.
