= BoHo Theatre =

Chicago-based theatre company

Boho Theatre

BoHo Theatre (incorporated as Bohemian Theatre Ensemble) was a non-profit Chicago-based theatre company. It was in operation from 2003 to 2023.

== Beginnings ==
The company was founded by artistic director Stephen Genovese until 2010, when he was succeeded by artistic director Peter Marston Sullivan. The last artistic director was Stephen Schellhardt.

BoHo Theatre's mission was "to create bold theatre that challenges convention through innovative storytelling and unites artist and audience in the examination of Truth, Beauty, Freedom, and Love through the lens of human relationships." The Company presented plays and musicals in a variety of genres and considers itself an incubator for up-and-coming Chicago talent. Over its years of operation, the company's productions were nominated for 82 non-Equity Jeff Awards (winning 19), including 5 Jeff Award for the Stephen Schellhardt directed Big Fish in 2019. Boho also won five After Dark Awards, and a Black Theatre Alliance Award. In 2013, BoHo Theatre received a Business Leadership Award from the Rogers Park Business Alliance.

== Endings ==
Due to changing theatre models in Chicago and the Pandemic shutdowns, Boho Theatre closed its doors in May 2023 after 19 years of creative, innovative and challenging productions.
