= Sri Lelawangsa =

Commuter rail system in Greater Medan, Indonesia

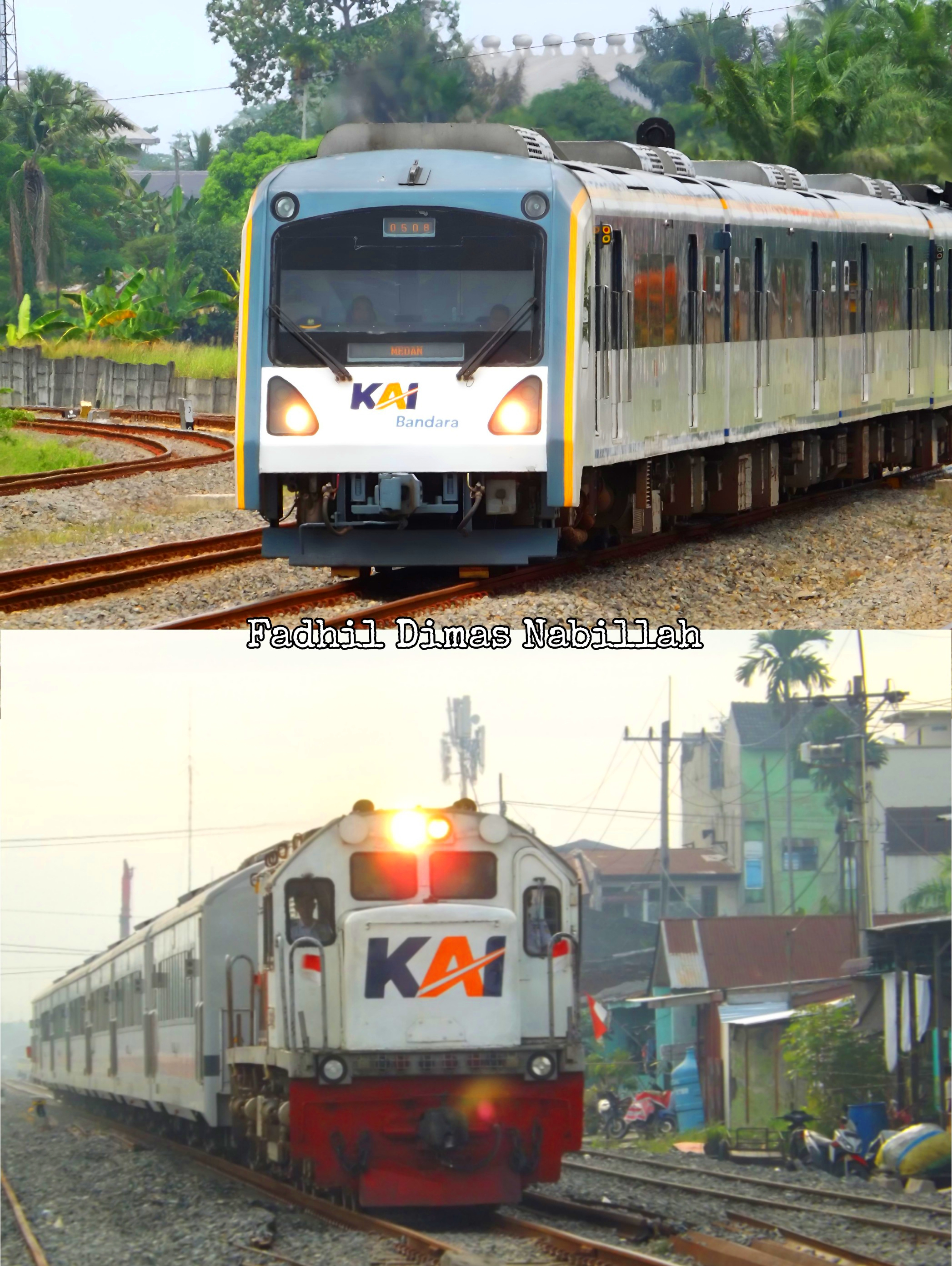
- Sri Lelawangsa using Woojin DEMU (left) and Sri Lelawangsa using locomotives and premium economy passenger coaches (right)

Overview
- Status: Operating
- Owner: Directorate General of Railways, Ministry of Transport
- Locale: Regional Division I North Sumatra and Aceh
- Termini: Medan; Kuala Bingai
- Stations: 3

Service
- Type: Commuter rail
- Services: 34 km (21 mi)
- Operator: KAI Bandara
- Depot: Medan
- Rolling stock: BB203, BB302, BB303
- Daily ridership: 2.5 million (2025) (Annual)

History
- Opened: 6 March 2010

Technical
- Character: At-grade
- Track gauge: 1,067 mm (3 ft 6 in)
- Operating speed: 70 km/h (19 m/s) Line Medan - Binjai, 80 km/h (22 m/s) Line Binjai - Kuala Bingai

Sri Lelawangsa is a commuter rail service in Indonesia operated by KAI Bandara (a subsidiary of Kereta Api Indonesia), serving Medan Station to Kuala Bingai Station route (both in North Sumatra) and vice versa. The service began operation on 6 March 2010 using Kereta Rel Diesel Indonesia (KRDI) DMU by INKA. But now the Sri Lelawangsa train series has changed to a Local Economy Class train pulled by locomotive BB302, BB303 or BB203 .

Sri Lelawangsa was initially serving three routes from Medan to Binjai, Belawan and Tebing Tinggi respectively, before the routes was cut down into Medan–Binjai starting on 2019. In 2022, the route was extended to Kuala Bingai.

Passengers can purchase tickets at a single fare, from Medan to Binjai and vice versa Rp 5,000, Medan to Kuala Bingai and vice versa Rp 7,000, Binjai to Kuala Bingai and vice versa Rp 2,000. There are 10 trips per day with the Medan - Kuala Bingai connection, there are only 2 round trips per day, while the remaining 8 are Medan - Binjai round trip.

== Incident ==
On December 4, 2021, this train crashed into an angkot at a level crossing in West Medan, resulting the total of 5 deaths and 4 injuries.

== Gallery ==
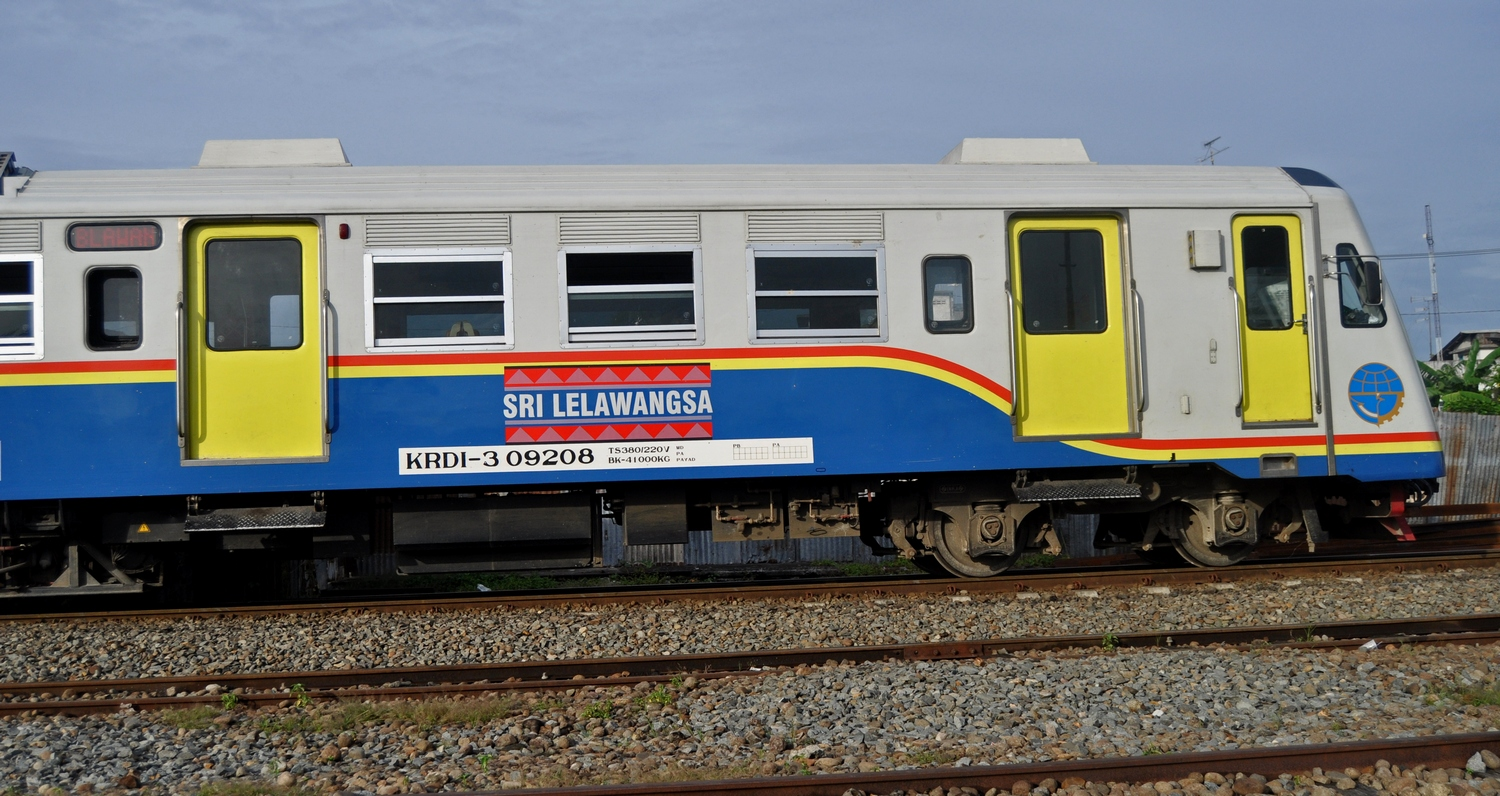
Sri Lelawangsa on the side, 2010

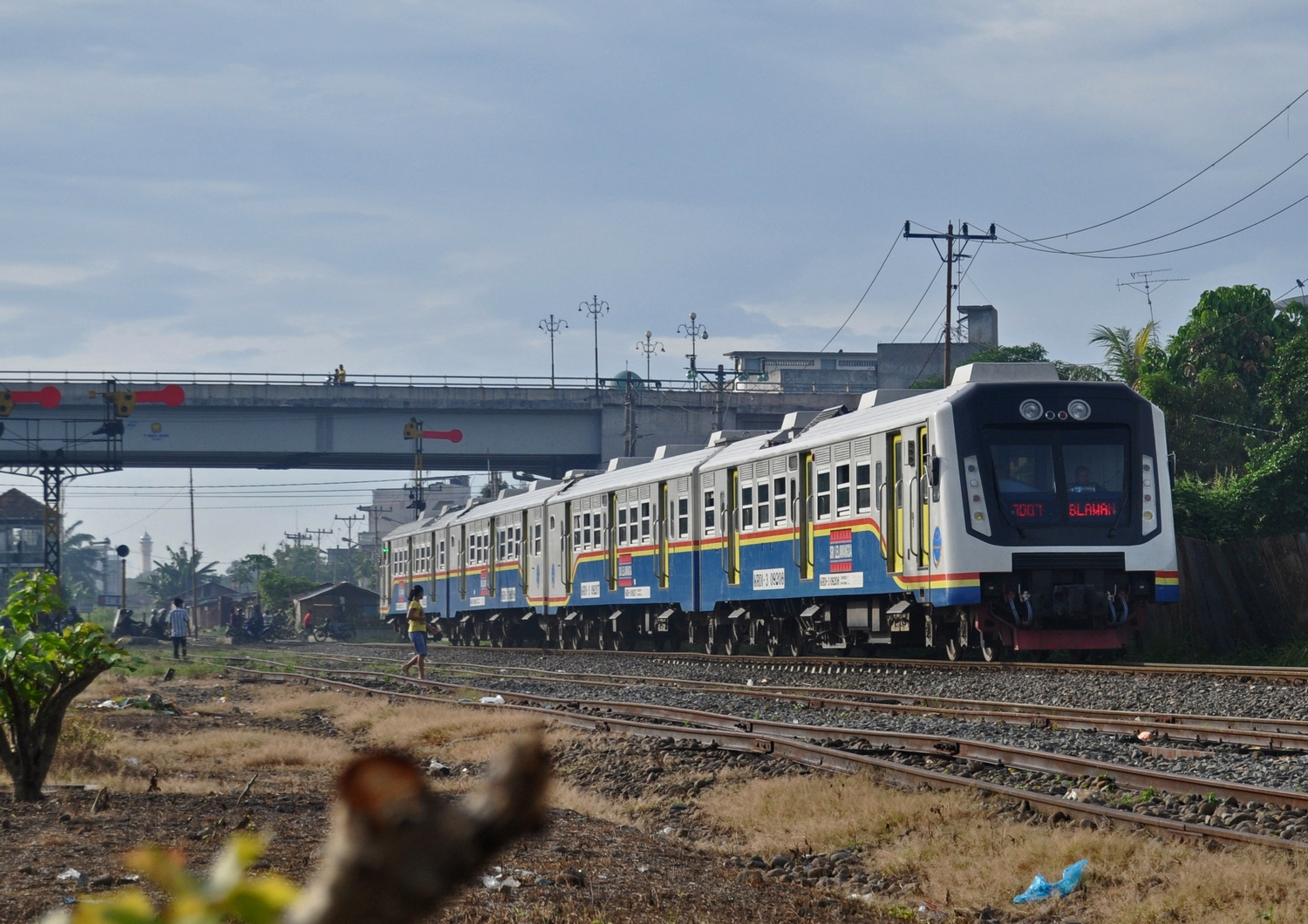
Sri Lelawangsa enters the station Pulu Brayan

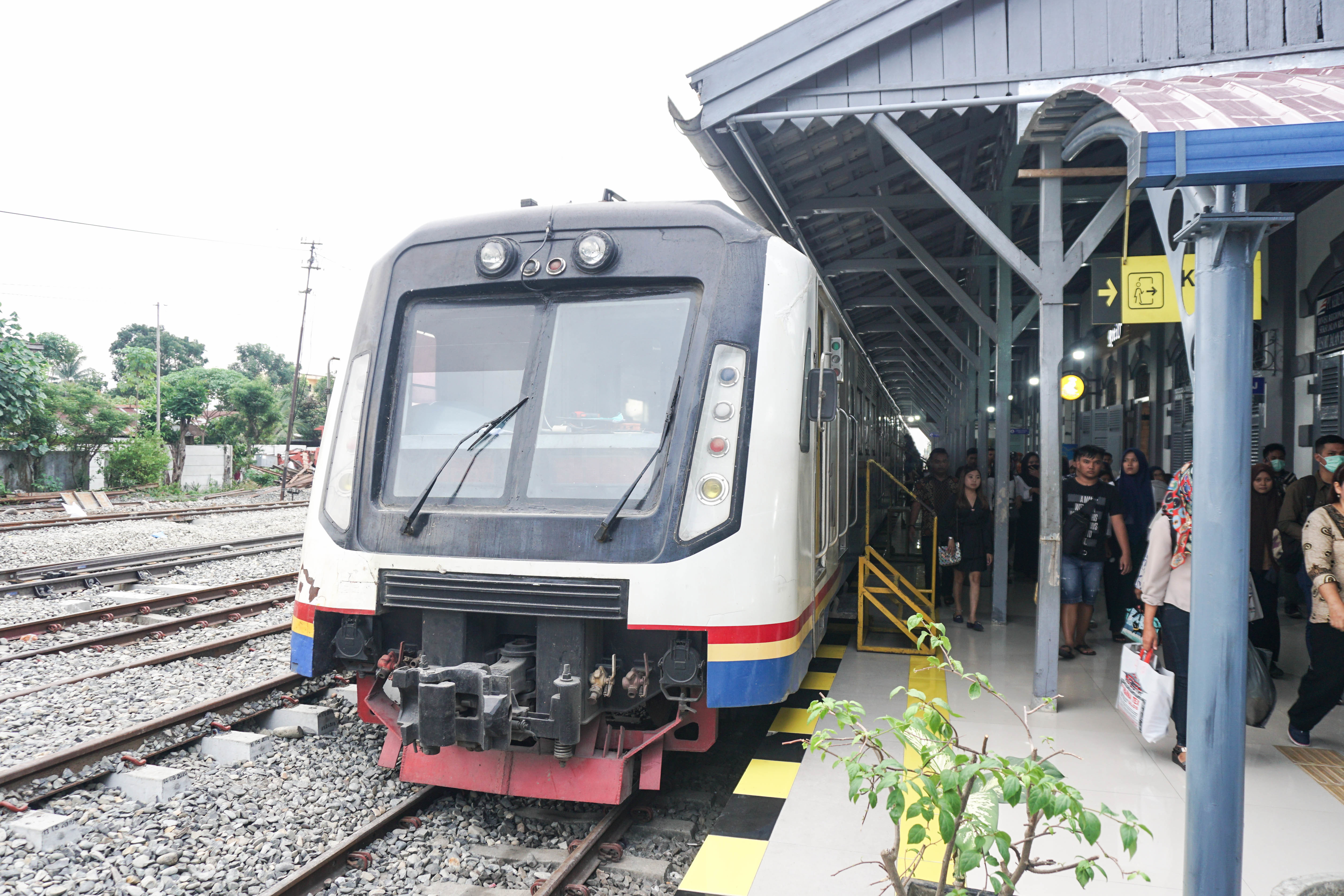
Sri Lelawangsa in Binjai Station

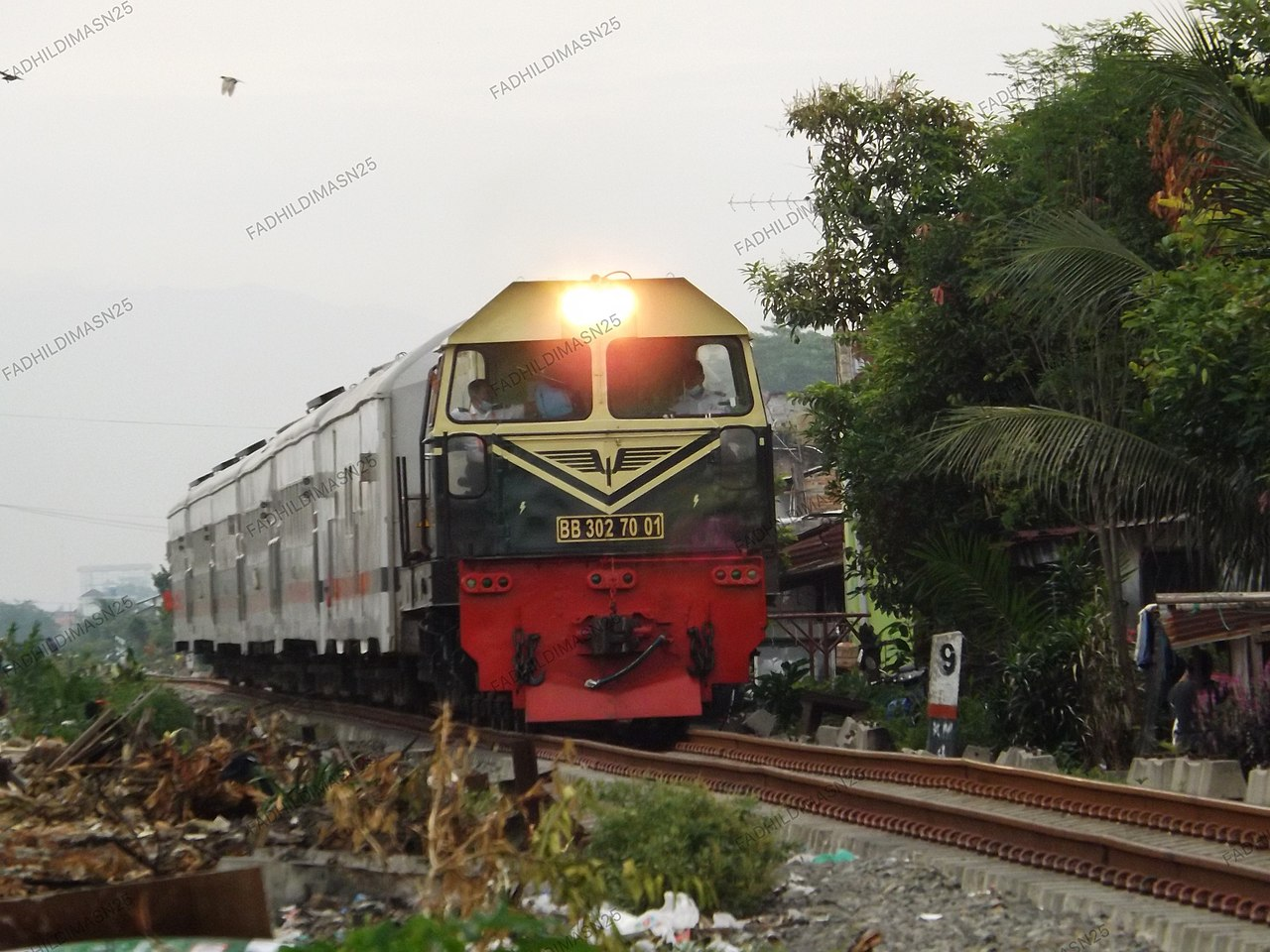
Sri Lelawangsa when pulled by a locomotive BB302. and Use vintage livery.

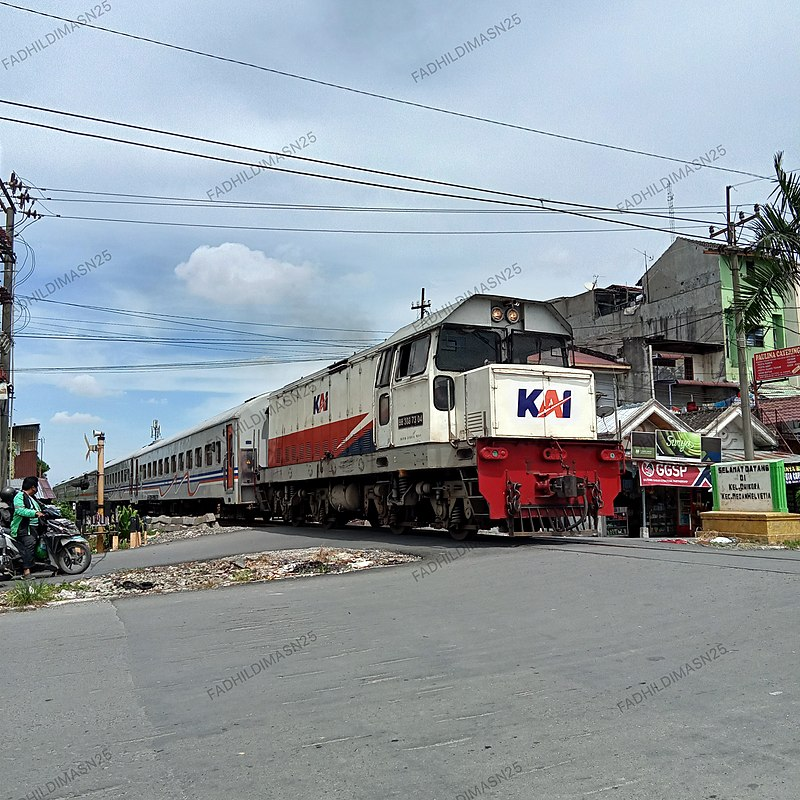
Sri Lelawangsa when pulled by a locomotive BB303.

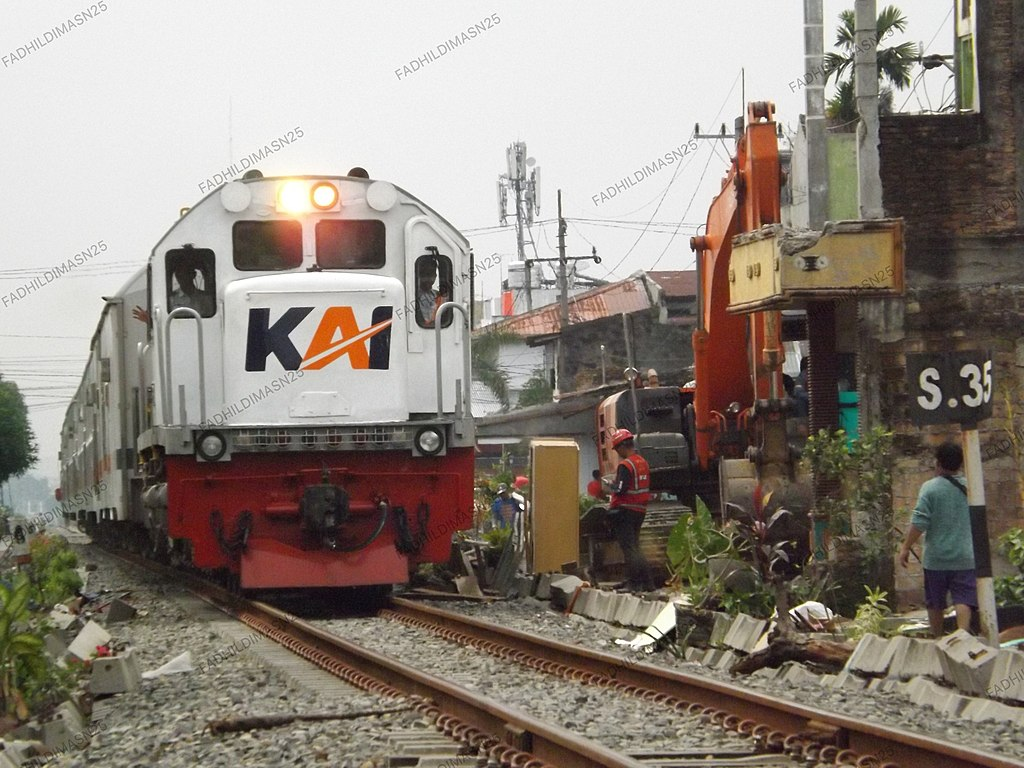
Sri Lelawangsa when pulled by a locomotive BB203.

== See also ==
- Pariaman Express
- Kereta Api Indonesia
- Rail transport in Indonesia
- List of named passenger trains of Indonesia
