= Boho, North Sumatra =

Coordinates: 3°11′N 125°31′E

Boho is a Batak village on the island of Samosir on Lake Toba, in the Indonesian province of North Sumatra.

== Description ==
Boho, unlike many other villages, does not get many tourists. It contains about 35 homes, including traditional Batak homes, and six shops that sell toddy (palm wine), coffee, noodles, and other snacks or soft drinks. Boho has a small school.

== Geography ==
It has a sister village named Harian Boho, which is about 30 minutes away. Buses often pass through Boho. The bus journey from Medan takes about 3–4 hours.
