= Deli Railway Company =

Railway company in the Dutch East Indies

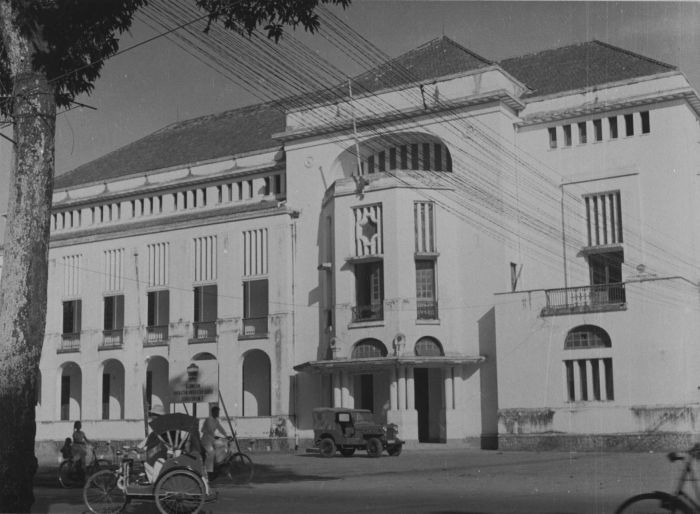
Head office of the Deli Railway Company in Medan, now the KAI's Regional Division I office

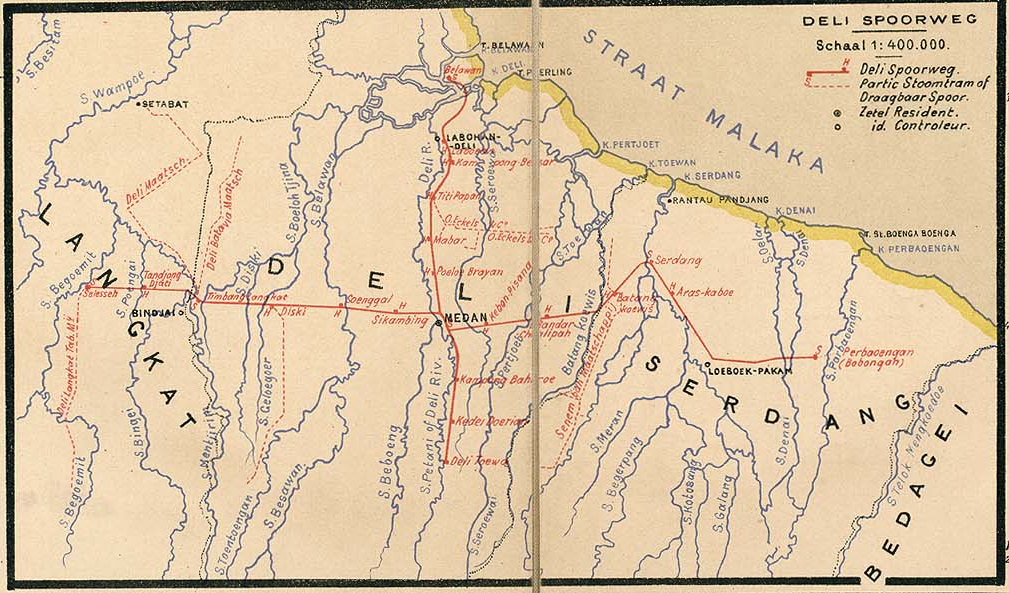
1893 map of the Deli Railway network

N.V. Deli Spoorweg Maatschappij (DSM, lit. 'Deli Railway Company plc'), was a private railway company that operated near the east coast of Sumatra around Deli (now Medan). The Deli Company established itself as a tobacco plantation and then expanded into tea, rubber and timber products. The company was founded in 1883. Routes were built in 1,067 mm (3 ft 6 in) (cape gauge). It was the last remaining private Dutch railway when it was taken over by the Kereta Api Indonesia (KAI) in 1957.

All DSM lines are operated under the Regional Division I of the KAI.

== History ==
The Deli Railway company was founded in 1883 with its official seat in Amsterdam. The headquarters was located in Serdang until 1890 and then moved to Deli, now Medan.

The company was capitalized with 2.6 million Netherlands Indies gulden increased to four million in 1889. A first concession was granted in order to facilitate the distribution of tobacco from the area's highlands. Jacob Cremer, of the tobacco wholesale Deli Company (Deli Maatschappij) was involved in establishing the company. Railroad construction broke ground on 1 July 1883 in the Resident of Siak Sri Indrapura. The first 56 km (35 miles) of track cost 2.43 million fl. Chinese workers were used.

Until 1912, W.H.M. Schadee was chief in Medan and then a director in Amsterdam. The driving force in Sumatra from 1919 - 1926 G.C.M. Smits. He also led the company as "dananch"" Amsterdam director. During the Great Depression Bernardus Hermanus Antonius van Kreel ran the company.

== Operations ==
In 1888 the company moved 28,559 tonnes (28,108 long tons; 31,481 short tons) of freight, mostly tobacco. The tonnage grew sevenfold by 1900 (90% of it tobacco). Share capital was increased in 1914 to 10 million. In order to finance larger investments bonds were issued.

A central maintenance facility originated in the suburb of Poloe-Brayan in north Medan. Rubber became an important freight after 1910. [3] In 1913, the transported 50,230 First Class passengers, 151,000 II, and 1.56 million III .: 1.56 million for a total of 31.4 million passenger kilometers. Luggage was 1,319 tons, cargo 163,000 tons and approximately 2,000 animals. This brought a turnover of almost 3½ million fl. against 1.45 million in expenses. By 1914, they had 263 km (163 miles) of route in operation. Tobacco decreased to 8% of freight by weight and 15% by volume. It was decided a capital increase to ten million in April 1913. A dividend was paid from 1900-11 of 10% and in the following years until 1919 of 12-15%.

In 1917 the railway carried 2.7 million passengers and 617,000 tonnes (607,000 long tons; 680,000 short tons) of freight. Since 1918, the Besitang connection was added to the network (750 mm / 2 ft 5 1/2 in) connecting with the Aceh State Railway (AT). This led to a further upswing in traffic which was moved to a [third rail line in order to unable the difference in track gauges. The connection to Pangkalan Brandan was finished in 1919.

== Interwar period ==
The business rebounded quickly after World War I. In 1920 there was a strike of indigenous workers and dividend fell in the early 1920s to 5-7%.

In the interwar period, won cargoes such as rubber / latex, lime, palm oil, fiber plants (hemp, sisal) and tea. At that time mainly from branch lines from Medan. Also for this purpose we went multiple bonds in 1925 and 1926 to 5% in the following year, 4.6 million to 4½% at 40 years. For local workers were laid at the major stations on their own settlements.

The export boom of 1926-8 led to good results. At the end of 1927 dealt to 3,727 people, of whom 174 Europeans.

In the crisis years of 1929-31 the revenue due to fallen rates fell from the cargo by one third, with the passengers by 46% back. The fare you had to ø 2 cents. / Km reduce what was also due to the increasing competition from buses. The amount of transported export, especially palm oil and fibers increased. Were built from about 8% staff. For the first time there was in 1931 no dividend. At the end of the year to employees at reduced wages only 2263 people, including 86 Europeans. [6] costs are also reduced by the introduction of mixed freight and passenger trains. Repeating lowered to 1935 fares. For the 3rd class, the revenue amounted to 1939 0.6 cents / Person km.

The route network reached 553 km (344 miles) in 1939. That same year, 4.1 million people went by train and the revenues generated from freight transportation rose until the outbreak of war. For the pre-war years the payout was 2½-4½%. Management was taken over by the Japanese. In 1941 there was a subscription form share capital of 18¾ million (nominal 30) 17½ million, compared to long-term liabilities. The book value of assets was approximately 59 million

== 1942-1957 ==
The Japanese called the united with the AT Society Kita Sumatora Tetsudo. The building of the head office, at the corner Serdangweg and Petersburgstraat, served from April to May 1942 as a detention center for 14 Dutch employees.

The end of 1945 designated to the company under the control of independent Indonesia as 'Keereta Api Soematra Oetara. From 1946 the Amsterdam Central took back control. A large proportion of European workers who had been interned returned home. In the first half 1946 there were only 22 white local managers. In order to meet the needs of the freight plantations, one directed in 1947 "Delispoor-AVROS transportation services" with trucks (up 1951). 1948 had already 1½ million passengers, but usually returns submitted only short distances, in the 3rd class for the price of 3 ½ Cent. / Km.

The devaluation of the Indonesian rupiah tripled the cost of imports in a short time. Strongly affected one was the general strike, which hit the region in April 1950. [7] The number of passengers rose quickly in 1955 reached to 4.4 million (173 million passenger kilometers). At the same time the number of travelers fell in the 1st class by two-thirds. The northern routes were increasingly unprofitable. In the politically troubled area there were repeated attacks and acts of sabotage. 1952 began with the planning of an automated signal box in Medan.

The DSM as the last private rail company in December 1957 when it was nationalized. The company, whose assets in Indonesia to end 1957 were 55.9 million fl. have amounted to, was dissolved and the Amsterdam Headquarters 1968 sold well below its value. After compensation negotiations of governments was recognized in 1969 to a nominal value of 11.9 million. Been demanded were 55 million. The shareholders then received a severance payment of 5.9 million, payable in installments of 1971 2002.

== Additional businesses ==
In the interwar period it also began initially barely profitable bus lines (as feeders for natives for free) to operate (in Brastagi, 1923)

One operation already from 1889 a hand-switched telephone network, its cable ran beside the tracks and that could be used by the public. It began in 1889 with 51 ports. 1900 around 200 participants were served. Beginning 1910 there were also in Batu Bahra (Asahan) a local area network. The carrying value of these investments rose by expanding rapidly, from 1903 69000 fl. On 524000 fl. 1912. Man mediated 1915 1180 Participants 5.3 million calls. At the beginning of 1920 we operated around 2000 terminals. Participants were divided into classes according to the number of expected calls and paid accordingly. From 1921 discussions by districts (approximately 50 km radius) were settled. In 1927 was signed with the State Post PTT a cooperation agreement as well as for connections to the PTT local networks that in Aceh, Karo District and South Asahan . The DSM undertook to modernize the plants. The depression led to fewer long-distance calls, so you barely 1931 recorded a net profit. In 1936, you type a zonal tariff. For the base price of 7.50 fl. Pm you got 75 local calls for free, more cost 2 cents each. 1956 a new telephone exchange with automatic switching was put into operation in Medan.

Coal for the locomotives they won on their own. From Kisaran (Asahan district) was built in the 1920s to the south 55 km distance to the coalfield.

It also held a logging concession, whose products were approximately half for their own use using. However grows on Sumatra no teak which was commonly used in the tropics for thresholds, so that you usually began steel for this.

== Routes ==
Name case follows the usual colonial times.

=== Route network in 1893 ===
Route network in 1918: 271 km (168 miles) (Cape gauge), to 130 km (81 miles) narrow gauge), 1939: 554 km (344 miles) (Cape gauge), of which 197 km (122 miles) of track for first class top speed at 75 km/h (47 miles per hour). [9]

=== Operations ===
The terrain is flat "Ostsumatras", structurally there was rarely climbs above 5 ‰ overwhelm. The Streckenbau nevertheless proved by the numerous rivers and swamps often difficult. Always provisions had to be made for the frequent floods in the monsoon and consequent damage to the tracks. The first tracks were laid in a bed of sand, soon was changed to gravel.

The opening of the line Medan- Timbang Langkat (21 km or 13 miles) was 1 April 1886. It was soon to Salesseh extended. Later they were taken on, almost exactly in a southerly direction to a rubber plantation. The on July 25, 1886 provisionally inaugurated route went to the port Belawan near Medan (22 km or 14 miles), but was initially only on a section to Labuhan Deli in operation since the construction of the bridge over the Sungei Deli proved difficult (New 1932), Next, they took the branch line 12 km (7.5 miles) from Medan to the south to Deli Toewo (= Deli Tua) about Kampung Bahroe in attack. The route from Medan to Perbaeongan went about Serdang, which was developed in the 1890s as a center of coffee cultivation and Lubukpakam . From this location later southwards towards Bangungpurba branching routes served rubber plantations. Until 1890 103 km (64 miles) of track had been completed. Bridges were built at that time for axle loads of 10–11 t (9.8–10.8 long tons; 11–12 short tons). The crisis of the tobacco sales in 1894 at first prevented the financing of planned extensions to Arnhemia, Bangun Purba and Rampah.

1900 efforts were made to concessions for the upgraded lines Perbaoengan-Bamban (after 1904 extended until Tebingtinggi ) Timbang Langkat- Tandjoeng, Poera-Pangkalan Brandan. The routes were all created single track. The approval in 1913 greatly expanded. The distance of the end of 1921 the port was Besitang Pangkalan NONCNONC extended. From Salesseh you extended a short branch line south to Kwala (Kuala =) for the disposal of wood.

From Tebingtinggi chain in the south a distance to Pematangsiantar from. This was the first real mountain section of the DSM, the first 8 km, the slope was 10 ‰, on the last 6 kilometers before Dolok Merangir one reached to 20 ‰. To use this section, four more locomotives, named after the place as Siantar type procured.

Coastal closer the train was to Kisaran (1927 branch to the port Telukinibung ) over Tanjungbalai was begun in during the First World War. Kiaran-Goenting Saga (6.7 million fl.) Opened on 4 September 1924 the extension to Milano (5.2 million) on January 1, 1931. The Bridge over the Sungei Asahan was 75 m, the longest, which was built by the DSM. 110 km through hilly terrain of Kisaran, the section of the route from Milano to Rantau Prapat, the last new mainline was before the war. She went into operation in 1937.. It began in 1935 with the laying of welded rails, making it one of the first railway companies, who introduced this technology.

In addition to replacement of damaged locomotives and wagons in 1947 resulted in the need for having to replace about 200,000 old sleepers at short notice. The network was established to 1950 the extent that top speeds of 50 km / h were possible. Coal is moved after the war from West Sumatra.

== Stock ==
Passenger cars 1 and 2nd class (1920)

Outside the station from Medan stands today as an exhibit a Hartmann-4T steam locomotive 2-6 ( Sächsische Maschinenfabrik ) built in Chemnitz in 1914. 1919 had the DSM 29 locomotives of various types. In addition there were 112 people, 27 baggage, freight and 529 601 cars of any kind. With the expansion of the 1920s rolling stock increased to 1936 to, inter alia, 61 locomotives, 10 rail cars, 167 persons, 54 baggage, 23 cattle and 1451 freight cars. For express trains to 22 1C2 locomotives procured preferred by Hanomag and Werkspoor .

After the war, still had 58 locomotives. Of these, 12 shunting locomotives (average age 59), 9 light (Ø 50 years) and 37 medium-sized and heavy locomotives (ø 30 J.). Some of the latter were converted in the early 1950s on diesel.

== Gallery ==
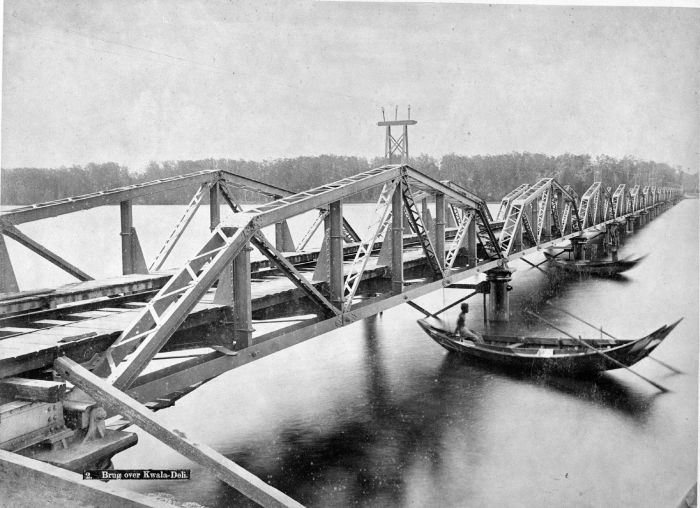
Rail bridge over the Deli River near Belawan

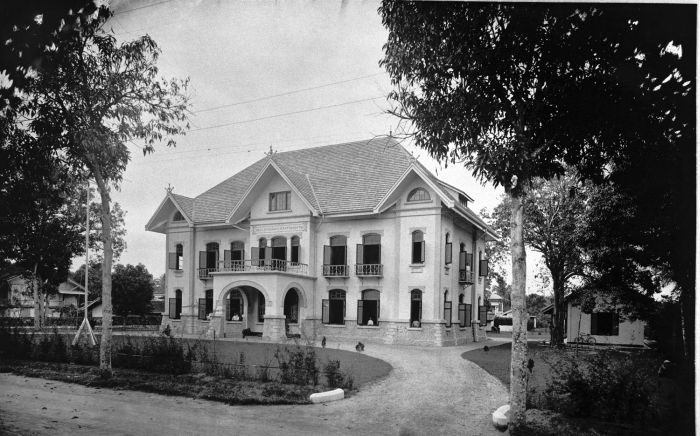
Office building in Medan circa 1920

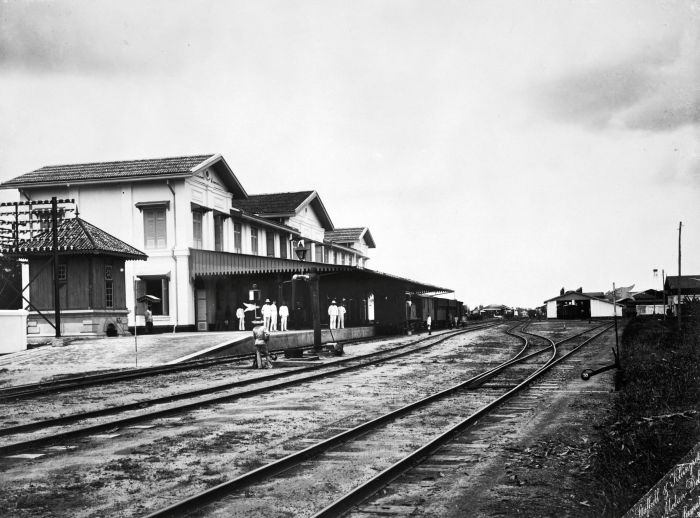
DSM station

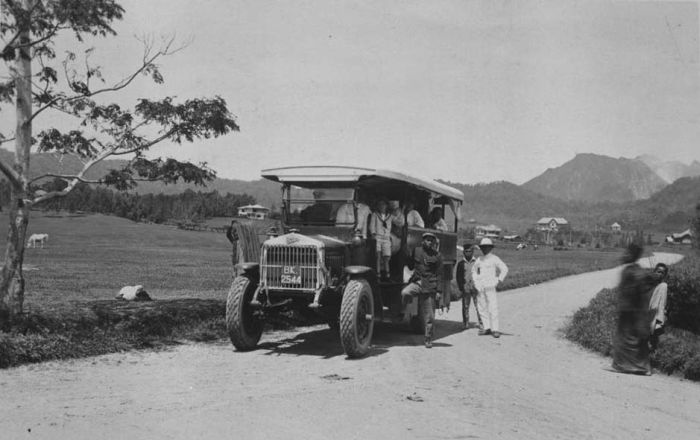
DSM Autobus in Brastagi

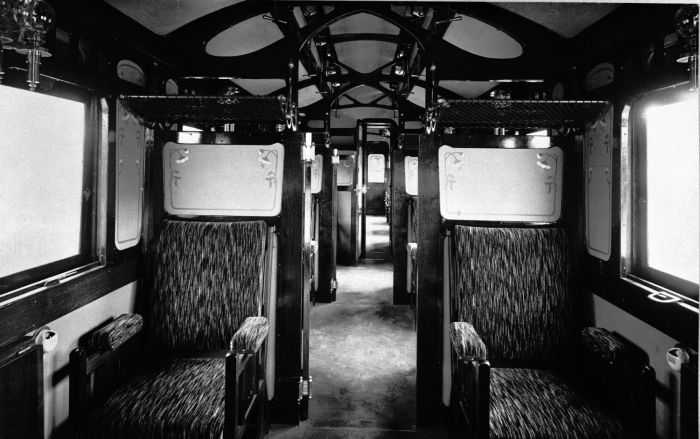
Interior of a first class compartment

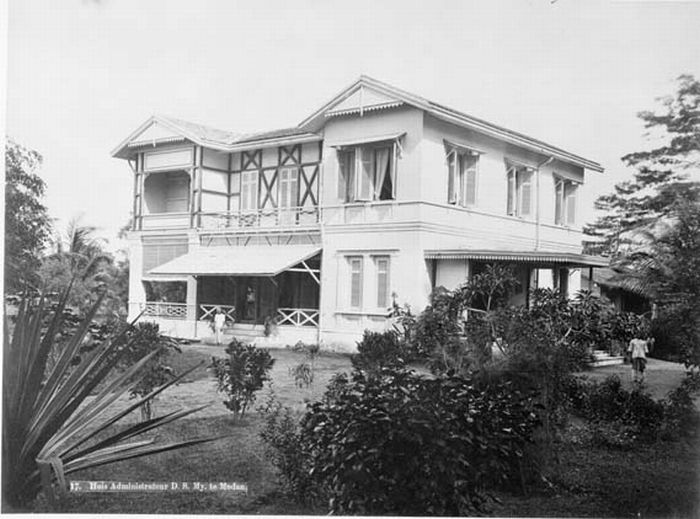
Administrators house in Medan

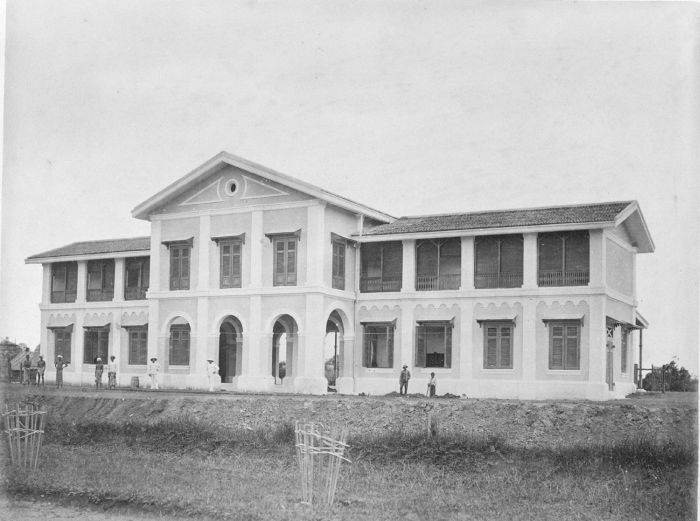
Train station building in Medan

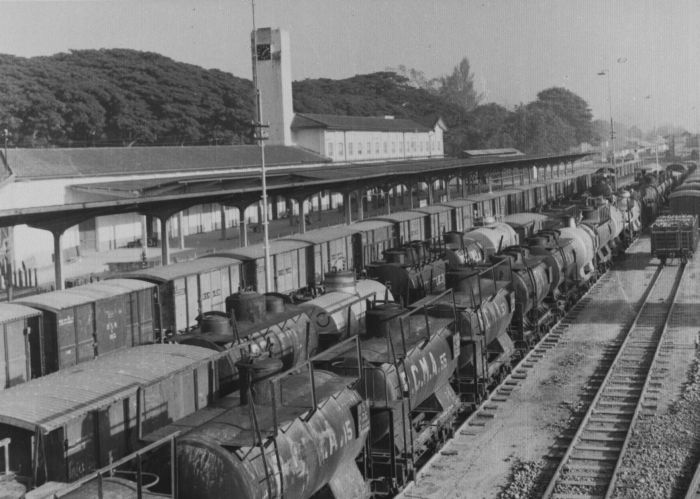

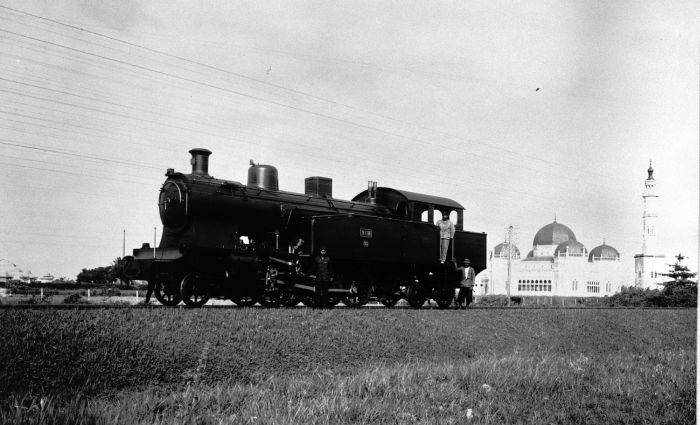
Locomotive with the Grand Mosque of Medan in the background

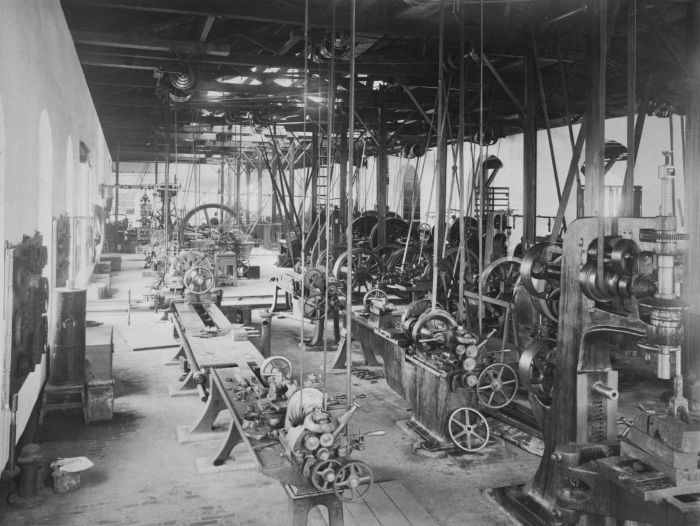

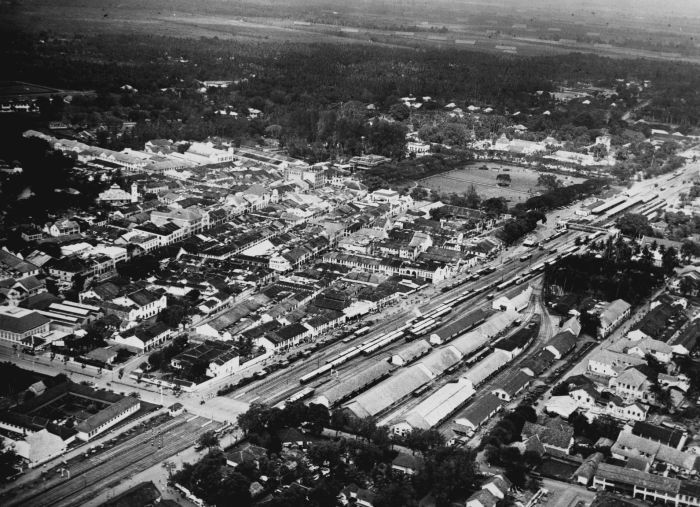
Aerial photo of the DSM railway in Medan (circa 1931)

== See also ==
- Private railways in the Dutch East Indies
- Management of the Dutch East Indies
- Sultanate of Deli
- Sumatra Railway

== Sources ==
- Meijer, H. (1904). De Deli Maatschappij Spoorweg: driekwart eeuw koloniaal spoor; Zutphen 1987. Walburg Pers. p. 152.
- Weisfelt, Jacobus (1972). De Deli Maatschappij Spoorweg as factor in de Economische ontwikkeling van de Oostskust van Sumatra; sl, sn. Rotterdam: Bronder offset.
- Annual Reports: Jaarverslag the Deli Maatschappij Spoorweg, gevestigd te Amsterdam; from 1884, later than the Jaarverslag Naamlooze Vennootschap Deli Maatschappij Spoorweg gevestigd te Amsterdam; ZDB ID 2030176-5
- Archival material: finding aids of the Dutch National Archives company history, technical Tekeningenarchief (1883-1948)
- Cards: postwar routes detailed on the map sheets Langsa (NB-47-14), Medan (NA-47-2), Tebingtinggi (NA-47-3) of the US Army Map Service, Corps of Engineers; Series T503, 1: 250000, first edition in May 1958 (data recording 1954)
