= Lampegan railway station =

Railway station in Indonesia

Lampegan Station Stasiun Lampegan
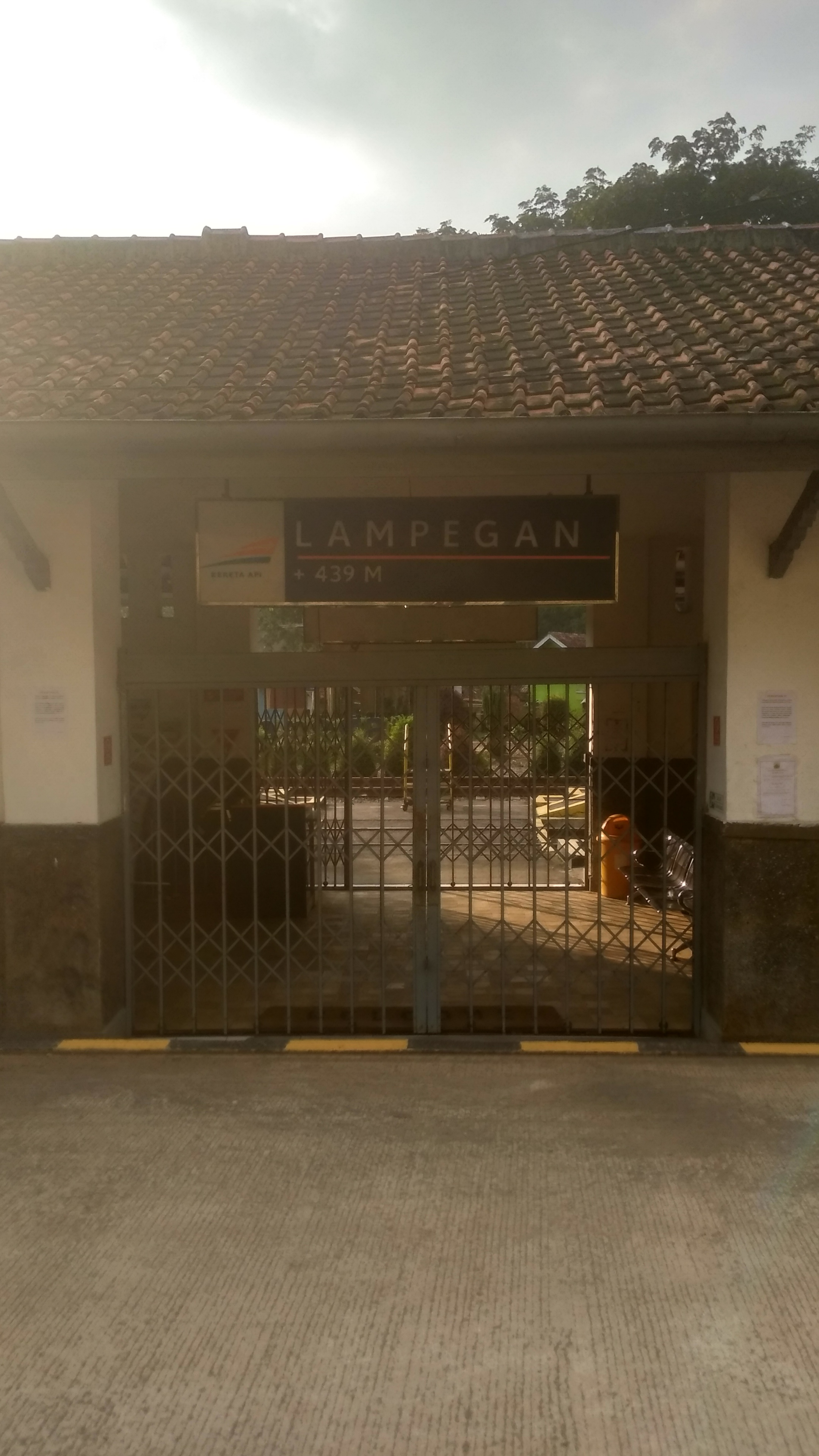
- Entrance of Lampegan Station

General information
- Location: Cimenteng, Campaka, Cianjur Regency; West Java; Indonesia
- Coordinates: 6.949977°S 107.061549°E
- Elevation: +439 m (1,440 ft)
- Owner: Kereta Api Indonesia
- Operator: Kereta Api Indonesia
- Line: Manggarai–Padalarang
- Platforms: 1 island platform 1 side platform
- Tracks: 2

Construction
- Structure type: Ground
- Parking: Available
- Accessible: Available

Other information
- Station code: LP
- Classification: Class III

History
- Opened: 10 May 1883
Location
- Location within Java

Lampegan Station (LP) is a class III railway station located in Cimenteng, Campaka, Cianjur Regency. The station, which is located at an altitude of +439 m, is included in the Operational Area II Bandung and is a railway station located in the westernmost part of Cianjur Regency.

The station is only about 8 kilometres (5.0 mi) from the Gunung Padang Megalithic Site, a national cultural heritage. The location is expected to boost the tourism sector in Cianjur Regency.

== Services ==
The following is a list of train services at the Lampegan Station.

=== Passenger services ===
- Economy class
  - Siliwangi, to Cipatat and to Sukabumi

== Incident ==
On 10 February 2014, the Siliwangi train from Cianjur Station to Sukabumi Station crashed at the mouth of the Lampegan Tunnel. Several train schedules had to be canceled.

Preceding station	Kereta Api Indonesia	Following station
Cireungas towards Manggarai	Manggarai–Padalarang	Sindangresmi towards Padalarang
