= Maseng railway station =

Railway station in Indonesia

Maseng Station Stasiun Maseng
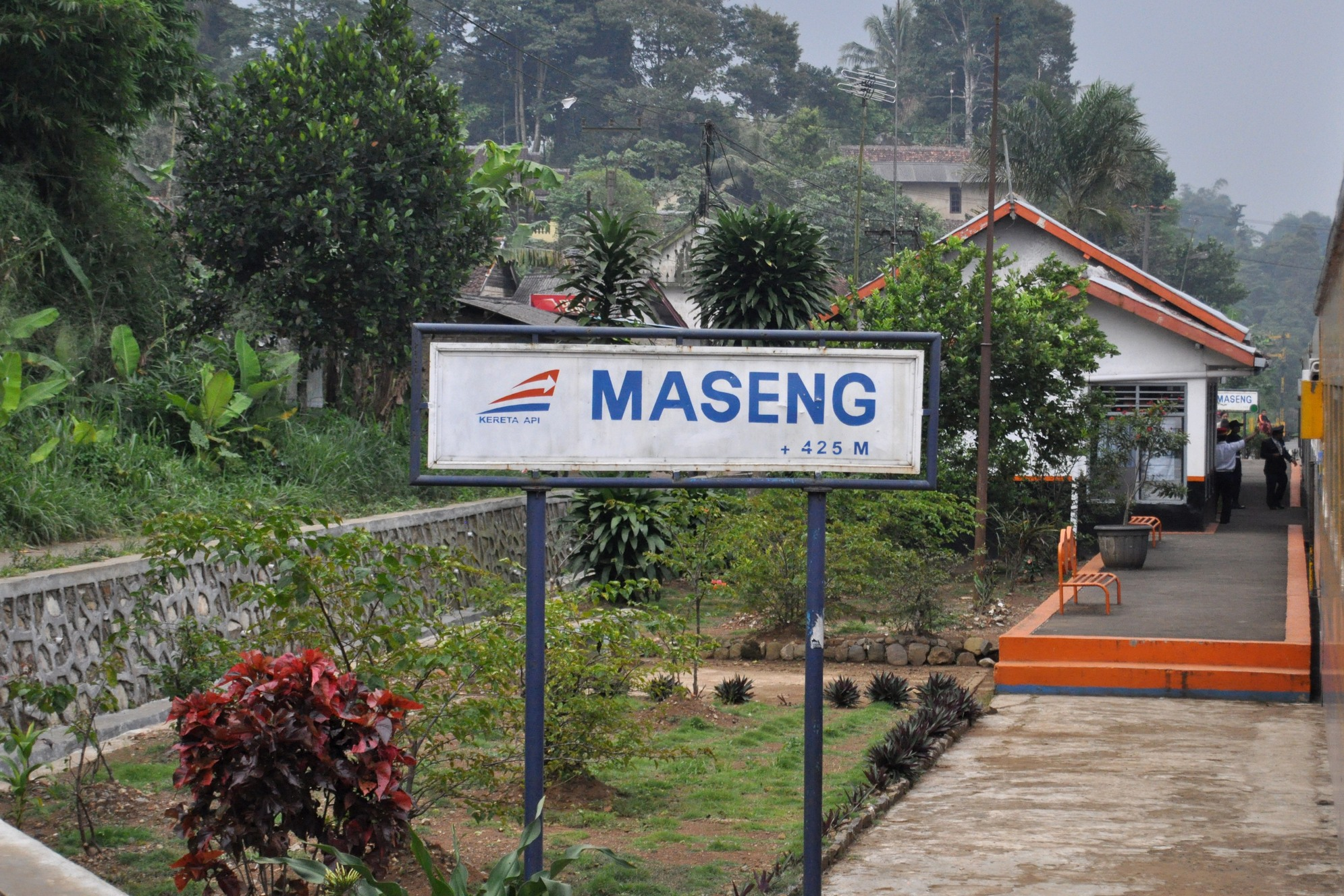
- Maseng Station

General information
- Location: Warung Menteng, Cijeruk, Bogor Regency; West Java; Indonesia
- Coordinates: 6.702555°S 106.814666°E
- Elevation: +425 m (1,394 ft)
- Owner: Kereta Api Indonesia
- Operator: Kereta Api Indonesia
- Line: Manggarai–Padalarang
- Platforms: 1 island platform 1 side platform
- Tracks: 2

Construction
- Structure type: Ground
- Parking: Available
- Accessible: Available

Other information
- Station code: MSG
- Classification: Class III

History
- Opened: 5 October 1881
Location
- Location within Bogor Regency

Maseng Station (MSG) (Sundanese: ᮞ᮪ᮒᮞᮤᮇᮔ᮪ ᮙᮞᮦᮀ, romanized: Stasion Maséng) is a class III railway station located at Warung Menteng, Cijeruk, Bogor Regency. The station, which is located at an altitude of +425 m, is included in the Operation Area I Jakarta.

== Services ==
The following is a list of train services at the Maseng Station.

=== Passenger services ===
- Mixed class
  - Pangrango, to Bogor Paledang and to Sukabumi (executive-economy)

== Incident ==
On 5 February 2018, landslides occurred at two points of the railway line, between Maseng and Ciomas Station in Cijeruk. This incident killed three people and caused the rail to hang which made the train impassable. As a result, the Pangrango train was forced to stop operating until the situation returned to normal.

Preceding station	Kereta Api Indonesia	Following station
Ciomas towards Manggarai	Manggarai–Padalarang	Cigombong towards Padalarang
