= Ciranjang railway station =

Railway station in Indonesia

Ciranjang Station Stasiun Ciranjang
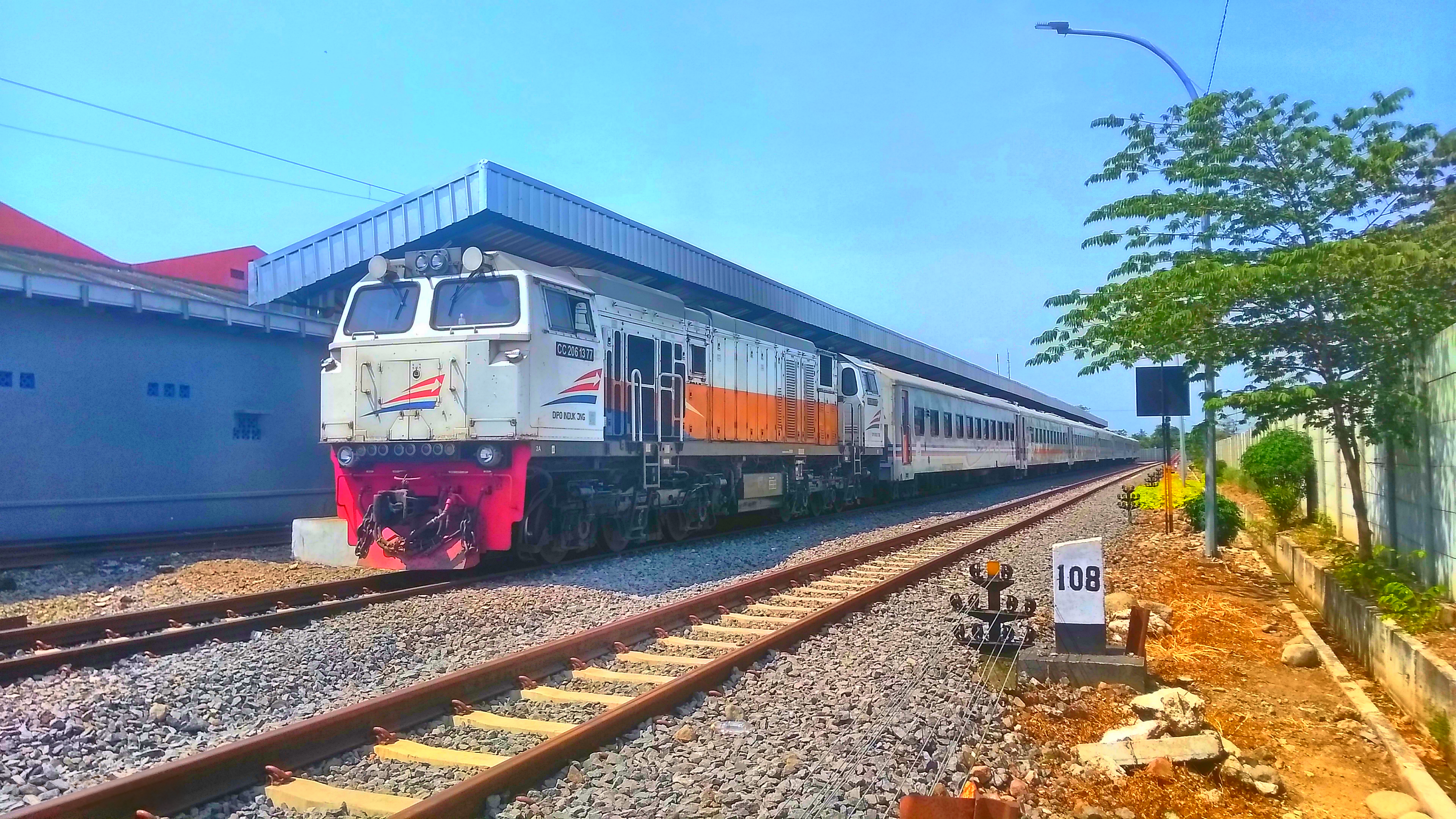
- Siliwangi train stopping at Ciranjang Station, photo was taken on 29 July 2020.

General information
- Location: Jl. Raya Cianjur–Padalarang, Ciranjang, Ciranjang, Cianjur Regency; West Java; Indonesia
- Coordinates: 6.814109°S 107.25126°E
- Elevation: +262 m (860 ft)
- Owner: Kereta Api Indonesia
- Operator: Kereta Api Indonesia
- Line: Manggarai–Padalarang
- Platforms: 1 side platform
- Tracks: 2

Construction
- Structure type: Ground
- Parking: Available
- Accessible: Available

Other information
- Station code: CRJ
- Classification: Class III

History
- Opened: 17 May 1884; Reopened 30 July 2019
- Closed: 2013
- Rebuilt: 2013–2014; 2019–2020
Location
- Location within Java

Ciranjang Station (CRJ) (Sundanese: ᮞ᮪ᮒᮞᮤᮇᮔ᮪ ᮎᮤᮛᮔ᮪ᮏᮀ, romanized: Stasion Ciranjang) is a class III railway station located in Ciranjang, Ciranjang, Cianjur Regency. The station, which is located at an altitude of +262 m, is included in the Operational Area II Bandung.

Before being inactivated, the station had served the Cianjuran local train. However, this train service was discontinued in 2013 due to the availability of spare parts for hydraulic diesel locomotives which were scarce, as well as the unavailability of subsidies from the Government through the Ministry of Transportation of the Republic of Indonesia.

The station was about to be reactivated to welcome the Kian Santang train service which was planned to operate in March 2014, but was postponed again and failed to serve regular trips in 2015 due to problems with facilities and infrastructure that were deemed unfit for operation.

Starting 30 July 2019, the station began serving passengers again along with the inauguration of the extension of the Siliwangi train route which previously only served Sukabumi–Cianjur.

== Services ==
The following is a list of train services at the Ciranjang Station.

=== Passenger services ===
- Economy class
  - Siliwangi, to Cipatat and to Sukabumi

Preceding station	Kereta Api Indonesia	Following station
Selajambe towards Manggarai	Manggarai–Padalarang	Cipeuyeum towards Padalarang
