= Karangtengah railway station =

Railway station in Indonesia

Karangtengah Station Stasiun Karangtengah
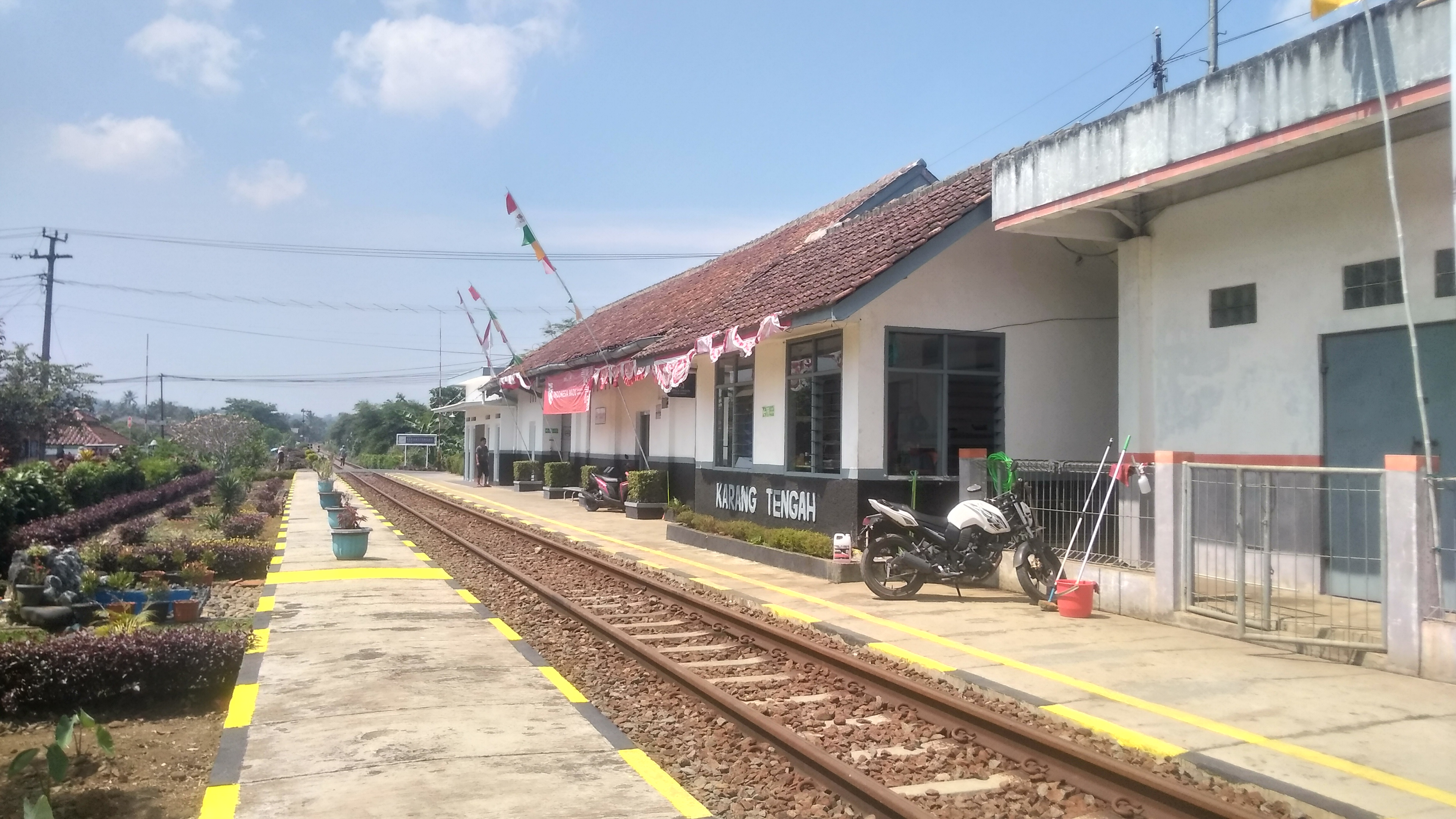
- Karangtengah Station, seen track 2 being demolished and converted into a small park, photo was taken on 28 July 2020.

General information
- Location: Ciheulang Tonggoh, Cibadak, Sukabumi Regency; West Java; Indonesia
- Coordinates: 6.896091°S 106.822427°E
- Elevation: +447 m (1,467 ft)
- Owner: Kereta Api Indonesia
- Operator: Kereta Api Indonesia
- Line: Manggarai–Padalarang
- Platforms: 2 side platforms
- Tracks: 1

Construction
- Structure type: Ground
- Parking: Available
- Accessible: Available

Other information
- Station code: KE
- Classification: Class III

History
- Opened: 21 March 1882
Location
- Location within Java

Karangtengah Station (KE) is a class III railway station located at Ciheulang Tonggoh, Cibadak, Sukabumi Regency, West Java, Indonesia. The station, which is located at an altitude of +447 m, is included in the Operation Area I Jakarta.

Initially, this station only had two railway tracks with track 1 as a straight line, but because nowadays there are almost no crosses between trains, track 2 was demolished and turned into a small park.

== Services ==
The following is a list of train services at the Karangtengah Station.

=== Passenger services ===
- Mixed class
  - Pangrango, towards Bogor Paledang and towards Sukabumi (executive-economy)

Preceding station	Kereta Api Indonesia	Following station
Cibadak towards Manggarai	Manggarai–Padalarang	Pondok Leungsir towards Padalarang
