= Cireungas railway station =

Railway station in Indonesia

Cireungas Station Stasiun Cireungas
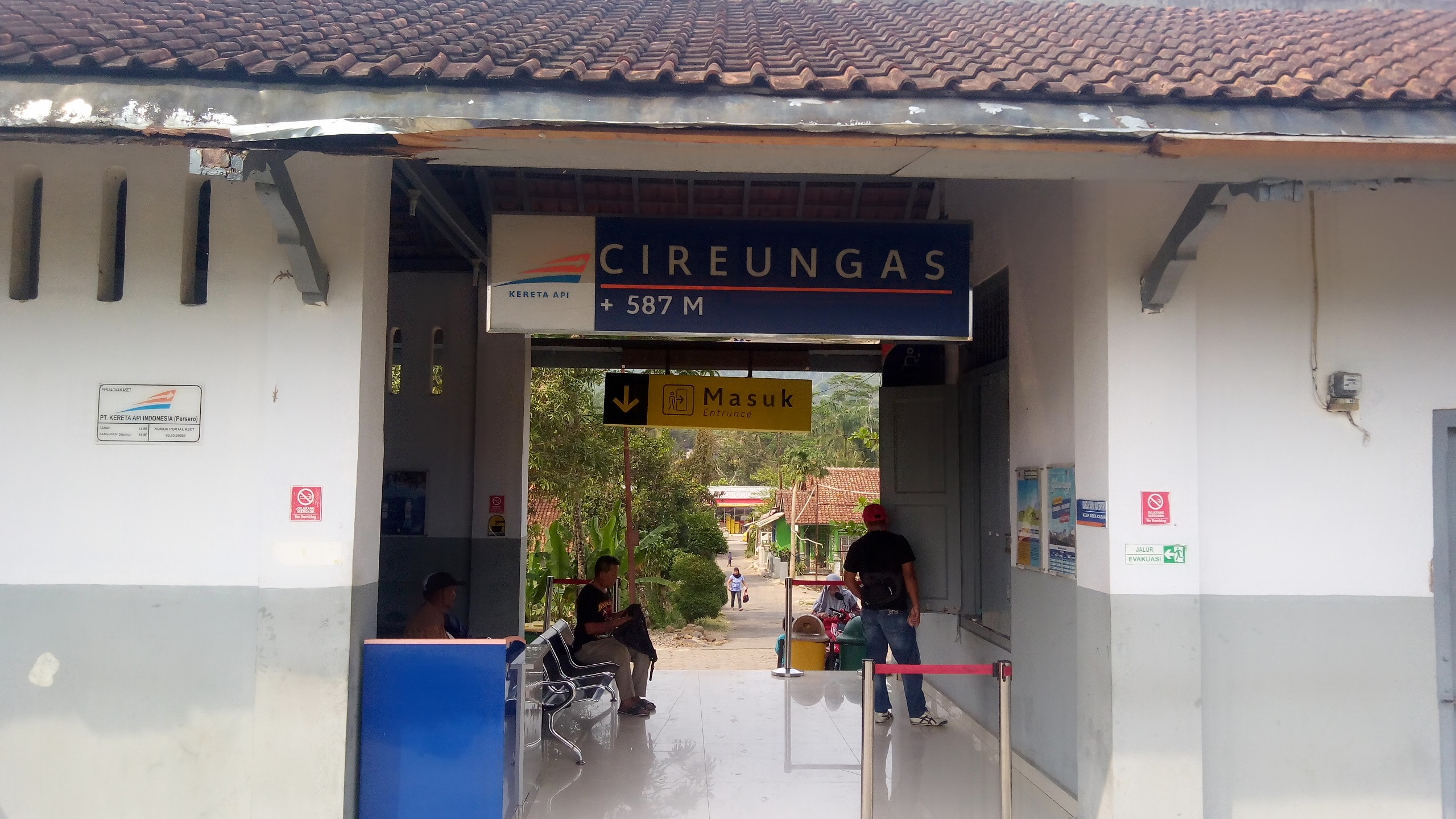
- Entrance of Cireungas Station

General information
- Location: Bencoy, Cireunghas, Sukabumi Regency; West Java; Indonesia
- Coordinates: 6.958534°S 107.037211°E
- Elevation: +587 m (1,926 ft)
- Owner: Kereta Api Indonesia
- Operator: Kereta Api Indonesia
- Line: Manggarai–Padalarang
- Platforms: 1 island platform 1 side platform
- Tracks: 2

Construction
- Structure type: Ground
- Parking: Available
- Accessible: Available

Other information
- Station code: CRG
- Classification: Class III

History
- Opened: 10 May 1883
Location
- Location within Java

Cireungas Station (CRG) is a class III railway station located in Bencoy, Cireunghas, Sukabumi Regency. The station, which is located at an altitude of +587 m, is included in the Operational Area II Bandung and is a railway station located at the most eastern and southern of Sukabumi Regency.

== Services ==
The following is a list of train services at the Cireungas Station.

=== Passenger services ===
- Economy class
  - Siliwangi, towards Cipatat and towards Sukabumi

Train operations at this station run from 05:40 WIB to 21:21 WIB. The busiest time at the station is the morning (05:00 – 11:00).

Preceding station	Kereta Api Indonesia	Following station
Gandasoli towards Manggarai	Manggarai–Padalarang	Lampegan towards Padalarang
