= Gandasoli railway station =

Railway station in Indonesia

Gandasoli Station Stasiun Gandasoli
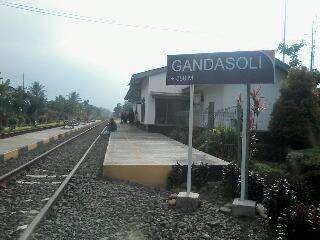
- Gandasoli Station

General information
- Location: Cipurut, Cireunghas, Sukabumi Regency; West Java; Indonesia
- Coordinates: 6.9415°S 106.992°E
- Elevation: +580 m (1,900 ft)
- Owner: Kereta Api Indonesia
- Operator: Kereta Api Indonesia
- Line: Manggarai–Padalarang
- Platforms: 1 island platform 1 side platform
- Tracks: 2

Construction
- Structure type: Ground
- Parking: Available
- Accessible: Available

Other information
- Station code: GDS
- Classification: Class III

History
- Opened: 10 May 1883
Location
- Location within Java

Gandasoli Station (GDS) is a class III railway station located at Cipurut, Cireunghas, Sukabumi Regency, West Java, Indonesia. The station, which is located at an altitude of +580 m, is included in the Operation Area II Bandung. This station only has two railway tracks with track 2 as a straight line and still uses a mechanical signaling system.

== Services ==
The following is a list of train services at the Gandasoli Station.

=== Passenger services ===
- Economy class
  - Siliwangi, to Cipatat and to Sukabumi

Preceding station	Kereta Api Indonesia	Following station
Ranji towards Manggarai	Manggarai–Padalarang	Cireungas towards Padalarang
