= Cigombong railway station =

Railway station in Indonesia

Cigombong Station Stasiun Cigombong
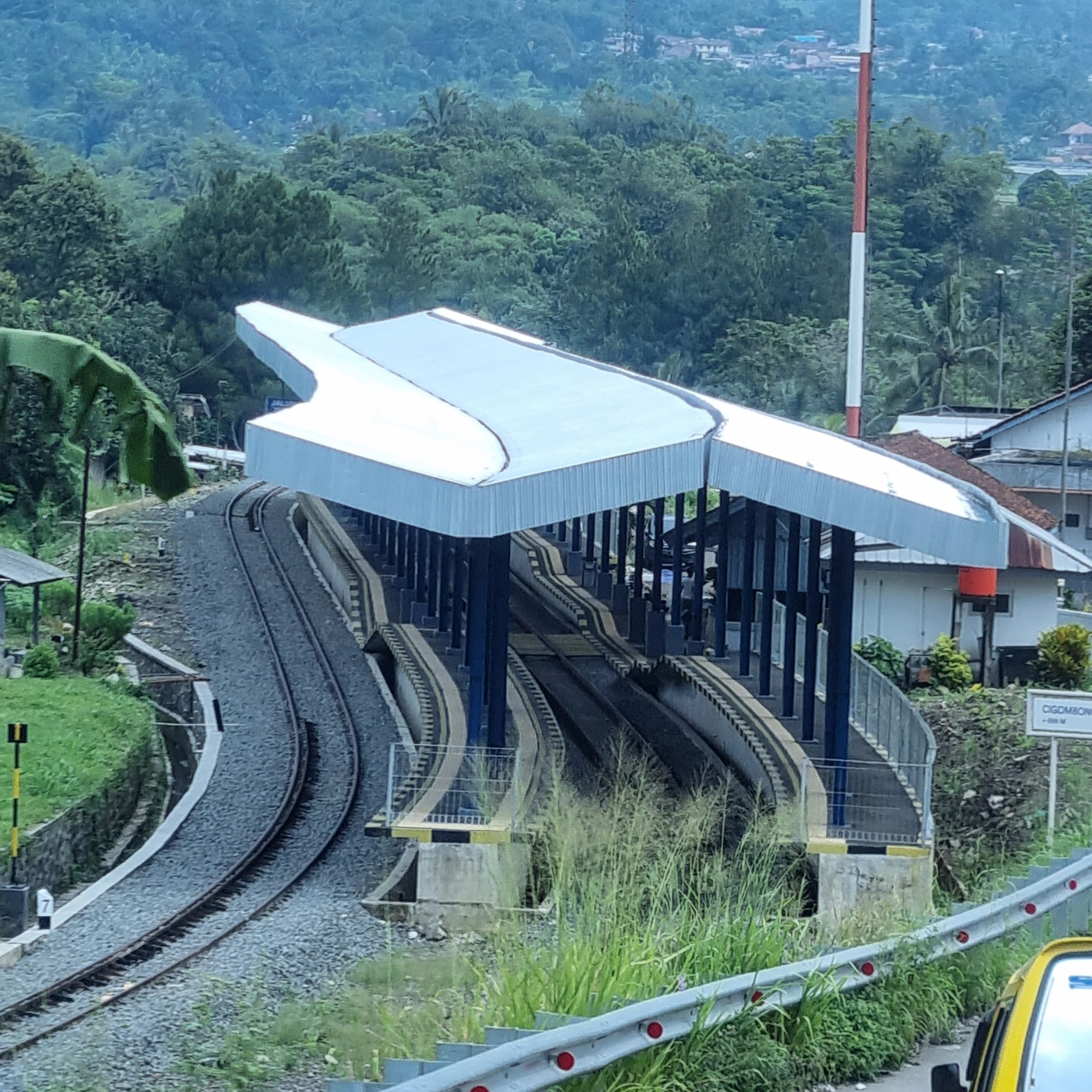
- Cigombong Station, 2022

General information
- Location: Cigombong, Cigombong, Bogor Regency; West Java; Indonesia
- Coordinates: 6.742333°S 106.803111°E
- Elevation: +699 m (2,293 ft)
- Owner: Kereta Api Indonesia
- Operator: Kereta Api Indonesia
- Line: Manggarai–Padalarang
- Platforms: 1 island platform 1 side platform
- Tracks: 2

Construction
- Structure type: Ground
- Parking: Available
- Accessible: Available

Other information
- Station code: CGB
- Classification: Class III

History
- Opened: 5 October 1881
- Former names: Tjigombong Halt
Location
- Location within Bogor Regency

Cigombong Station (CGB) (Sundanese: ᮞ᮪ᮒᮞᮤᮇᮔ᮪ ᮎᮤᮌᮧᮙ᮪ᮘᮧᮀ, romanized: Stasion Cigombong) is a class III railway station located in Cigombong, Cigombong, Bogor Regency. The station, which is located at an altitude of +699 m, is included in the Operation Area I Jakarta.

== Services ==
The following is a list of train services at the Cigombong Station.

=== Passenger services ===
- Mixed class
  - Pangrango, towards Bogor Paledang and towards Sukabumi (executive-economy)

Preceding station	Kereta Api Indonesia	Following station
Maseng towards Manggarai	Manggarai–Padalarang	Cicurug towards Padalarang
