= Cibadak railway station =

Railway station in Indonesia

Cibadak Station Stasiun Cibadak

General information
- Location: Jl. Raya Ciawi-Sukabumi, Cibadak, Cibadak, Sukabumi Regency; West Java; Indonesia
- Coordinates: 6.888333°S 106.780444°E
- Elevation: +380 m (1,250 ft)
- Owner: Kereta Api Indonesia
- Operator: Kereta Api Indonesia
- Line: Manggarai–Padalarang
- Platforms: 1 island platform 1 side platform
- Tracks: 2

Construction
- Structure type: Ground
- Parking: Available
- Accessible: Available

Other information
- Station code: CBD
- Classification: Class III

History
- Opened: 21 March 1882
Location
- Location within Java

Cibadak Station (CBD) (Sundanese: ᮞ᮪ᮒᮞᮤᮇᮔ᮪ ᮎᮤᮘᮓᮊ᮪, romanized: Stasion Cibadak) is a class III railway station located in Cibadak, Cibadak, Sukabumi Regency. The station, which is located at an altitude of +380 meters, is included in the Operation Area I Jakarta.

== Services ==
The following is a list of train services at the Cibadak Station.

=== Passenger services ===
- Mixed class
  - Pangrango, towards Bogor and towards Sukabumi (executive-economy)

| Preceding station | Kereta Api Indonesia | Following station |
|---|---|---|
| Parungkuda towards Manggarai | Manggarai–Padalarang | Karangtengah towards Padalarang |
