= CGB =

CGB may refer to:

- Central Guard Bureau of the General Office of the Chinese Communist Party
- Chorionic gonadotropin beta, a protein encoded by the CGB gene
- Christian Trade Union Federation of Germany
- Compagnie des Chemins de Fer de Grande Banlieue, a defunct railway in France
- Consumer and Governmental Affairs Bureau, a part of the U.S. Federal Communications Commission
- Craigieburn railway station, Melbourne
- Game Boy Color (product code CGB-001), Nintendo
- Marechal Rondon International Airport (IATA code), in Cuiabá, Brazil
- Station code for Cigombong railway station
