= Sayang =

- kelurahan
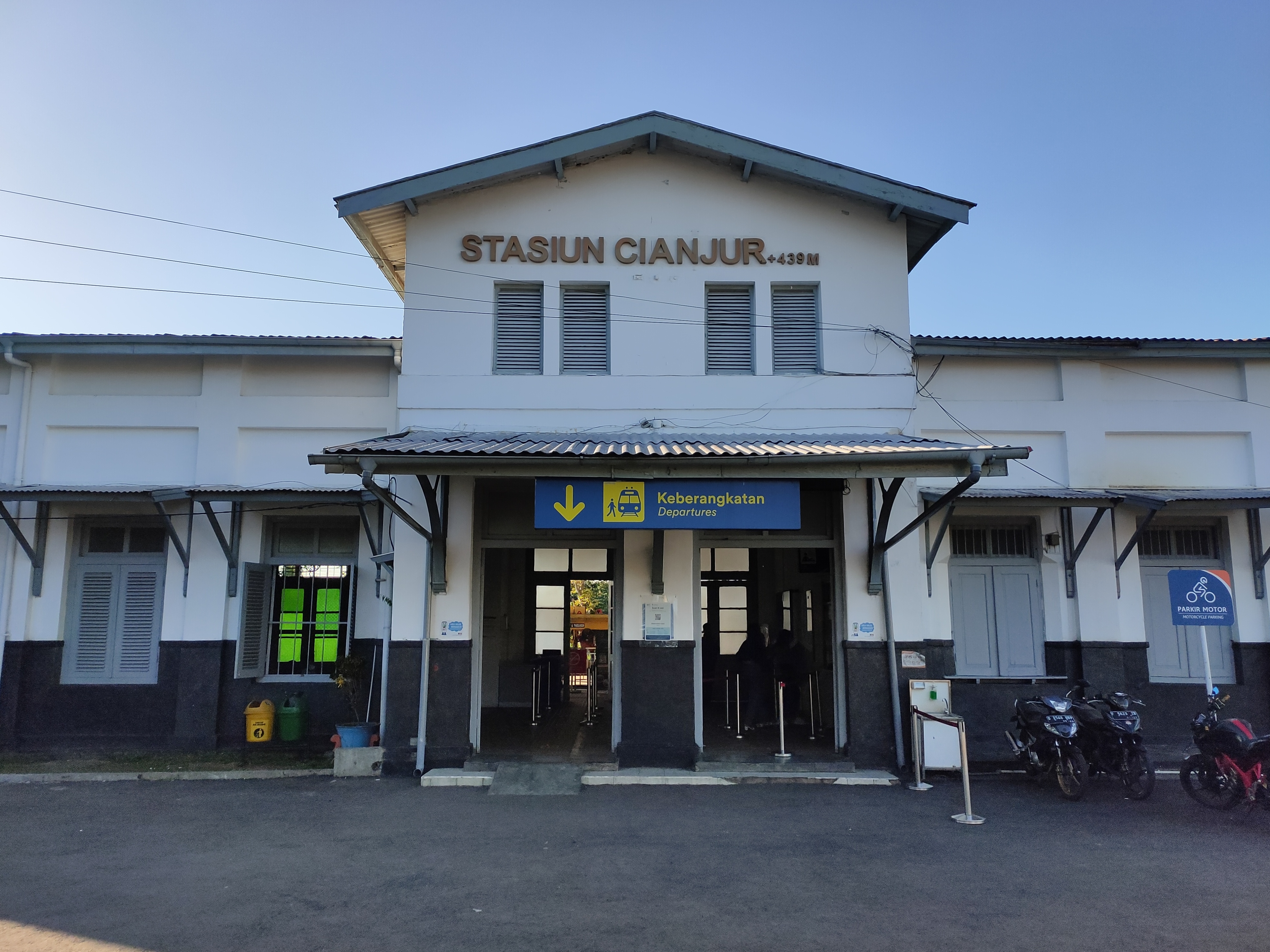
- Cianjur railway station in Sayang
- Interactive map of Sayang
- Coordinates: 6°49′44.00″S 107°8′37.00″E
- Country: Indonesia
- Province: West Java
- Regency: Cianjur Regency
- District: Cianjur

Area
  - Total: 1.824 km^{2} (0.704 sq mi)

Population (mid 2022)
  - Total: 29,904
  - Density: 16,390/km^{2} (42,460/sq mi)
- Time zone: UTC+7 (IST)
- Postal code: 43213

Sayang is a subdistrict (kelurahan) in Cianjur, Cianjur Regency, West Java Province, Indonesia. This subdistrict covers an area of approximately 1.824 km² and had a population of 29,904 as of April 2022, with a population density of 16,393 people per km².

== Geography ==
Sayang is situated at the heart of Cianjur district, making it one of the most active areas in terms of economy and governance within Cianjur Regency. The geographical coordinates of this subdistrict are 6°50'4.8311" S and 107°8'28.748" E.

== Infrastructure ==
Sayang is home to several public facilities and key infrastructures, including Cianjur Station, a Class II railway station in the area. The station serves train routes connecting Bandung and Bogor, making it one of the primary transportation hubs in Cianjur Regency.

== Demographics ==
With a population of 29,904 people (as of April 2022), Sayang is one of the most densely populated areas. Its strategic location in the center of Cianjur contributes to its role as a hub for residential and economic activities.

== Transportation ==
Cianjur Station, located in Sayang, plays a significant role in regional connectivity within West Java. The station links Cianjur Regency to major cities such as Bandung and Sukabumi.
