= Pangrango (train) =

Train service in Indonesia

Pangrango train
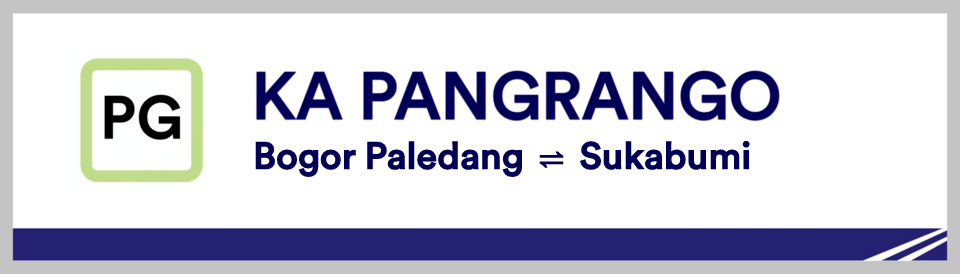

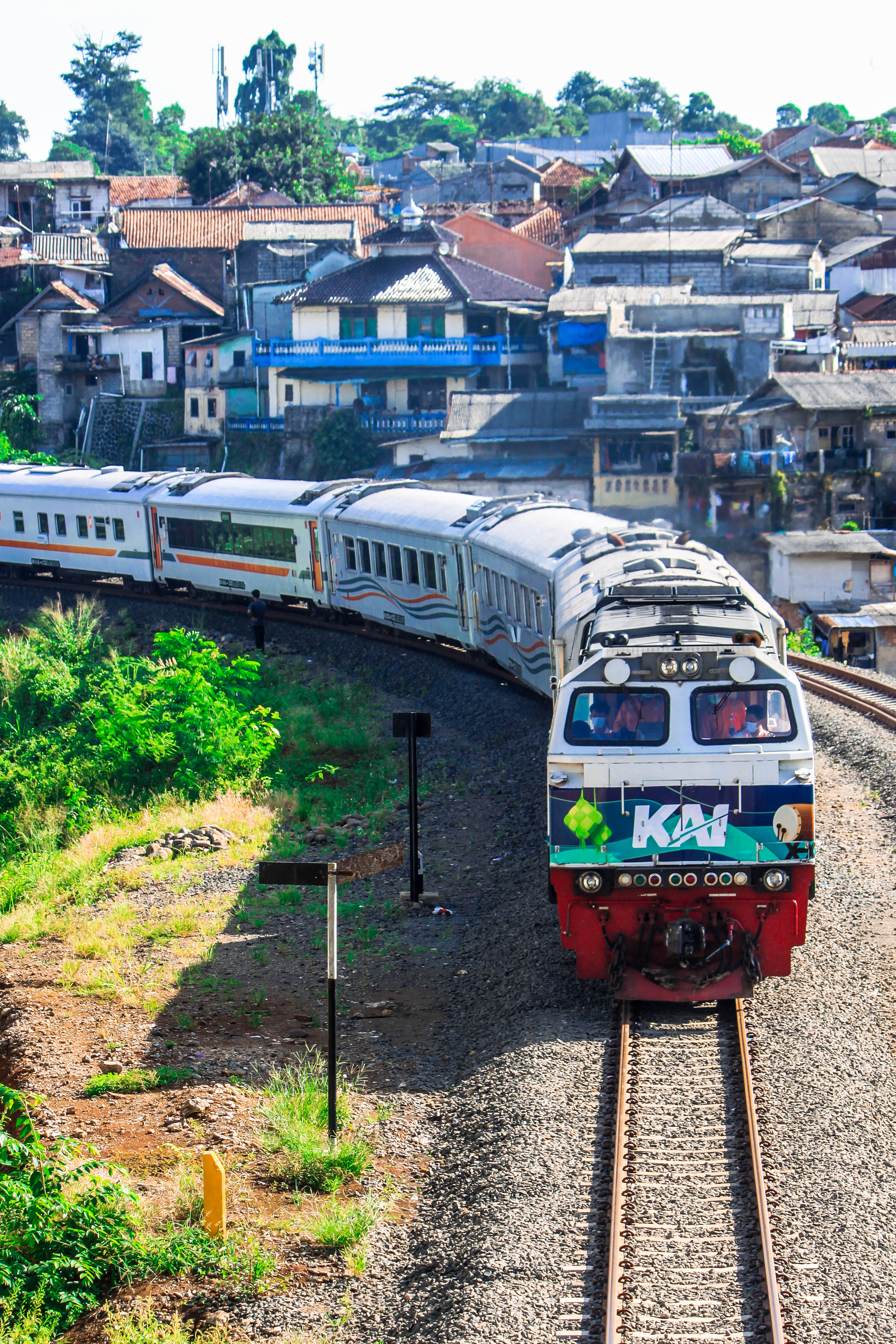
- Pangrango train passing through the settlement area between Bogor Paledang station and Batutulis station

Overview
- Native name: Kereta Api Pangrango
- Status: Operational
- Owner: Ministry of Transportation
- Termini: Bogor; Sukabumi
- Stations: 11

Service
- Type: Heavy rail
- Operator: Kereta Api Indonesia

History
- Opened: 9 November 2013

Technical
- Line length: 57 km (35 mi)
- Track gauge: 1067 mm
- Operating speed: 20–40 km/h (12–25 mph)

The Pangrango (Indonesian: Kereta Api Pangrango) is an executive and economy class (new image/premium economy) passenger train service operated by Kereta Api Indonesia, running from Sukabumi to Bogor in West Java, Indonesia and vice versa. The train carries executive and economy class passenger trains with a 2-2 seating arrangement. On the travel map, the train is coded (PG) and colored feijoa ( ).

== History ==
Pangrango began its operation on 9 November 2013 to replace the Bumi Geulis train which had ceased operation on 15 December 2012. The name "Pangrango" is taken from Mount Pangrango, a mountain in the Mount Gede Pangrango National Park area.

The executive class service on the train was abolished on 1 January 2016. Due to customer requests, KAI returned executive class on 21 January 2016 and underwent fare adjustments due to the elimination of subsidies.

On 10 April 2022, Pangrango was officially operating again after 2 years because of the Bogor-Sukabumi railway closing, resulted in the double track project on Bogor–Cicurug section.

Starting 1 June 2022, Pangrango Train began serving Bogor Station again in order to facilitate transit of passengers from Bogor Line of the KRL Commuterline traveling to Sukabumi and vice versa.

== List of stations ==
Stations		Transfer/Notes	Location	
Code	Name	Transfer/Notes	City/Regency	Province
PG01	Bogor Paledang	Terminal station. Interchange station to (via Bogor by skywalk) 2F 3F 5F BISKITA Trans Pakuan (BRT) Bogor city and regency angkot	Bogor	West Java
PG02	Batutulis	3F BISKITA Trans Pakuan (BRT)	Bogor	West Java
PG04	Maseng		Bogor Regency	West Java
PG05	Cigombong		Bogor Regency	West Java
PG06	Cicurug		Sukabumi Regency	West Java
PG07	Parungkuda		Sukabumi Regency	West Java
PG08	Cibadak		Sukabumi Regency	West Java
PG09	Karangtengah		Sukabumi Regency	West Java
PG10	Cisaat		Sukabumi Regency	West Java
PG11 SW01	Sukabumi	Terminal station. Interchange station to SW Siliwangi local train	Sukabumi	West Java

== Gallery ==
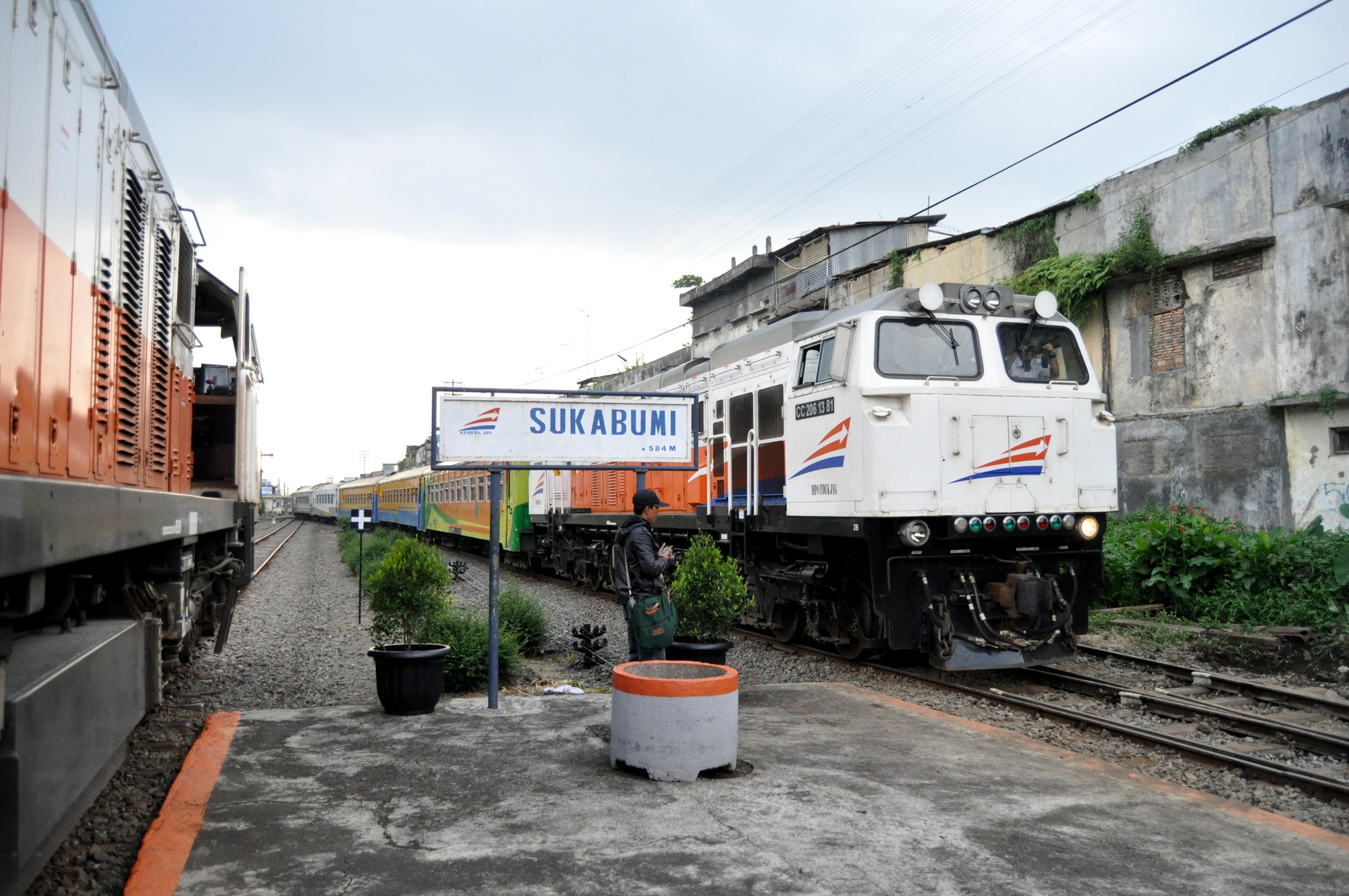
Pangrango train entering Sukabumi Station (2014)

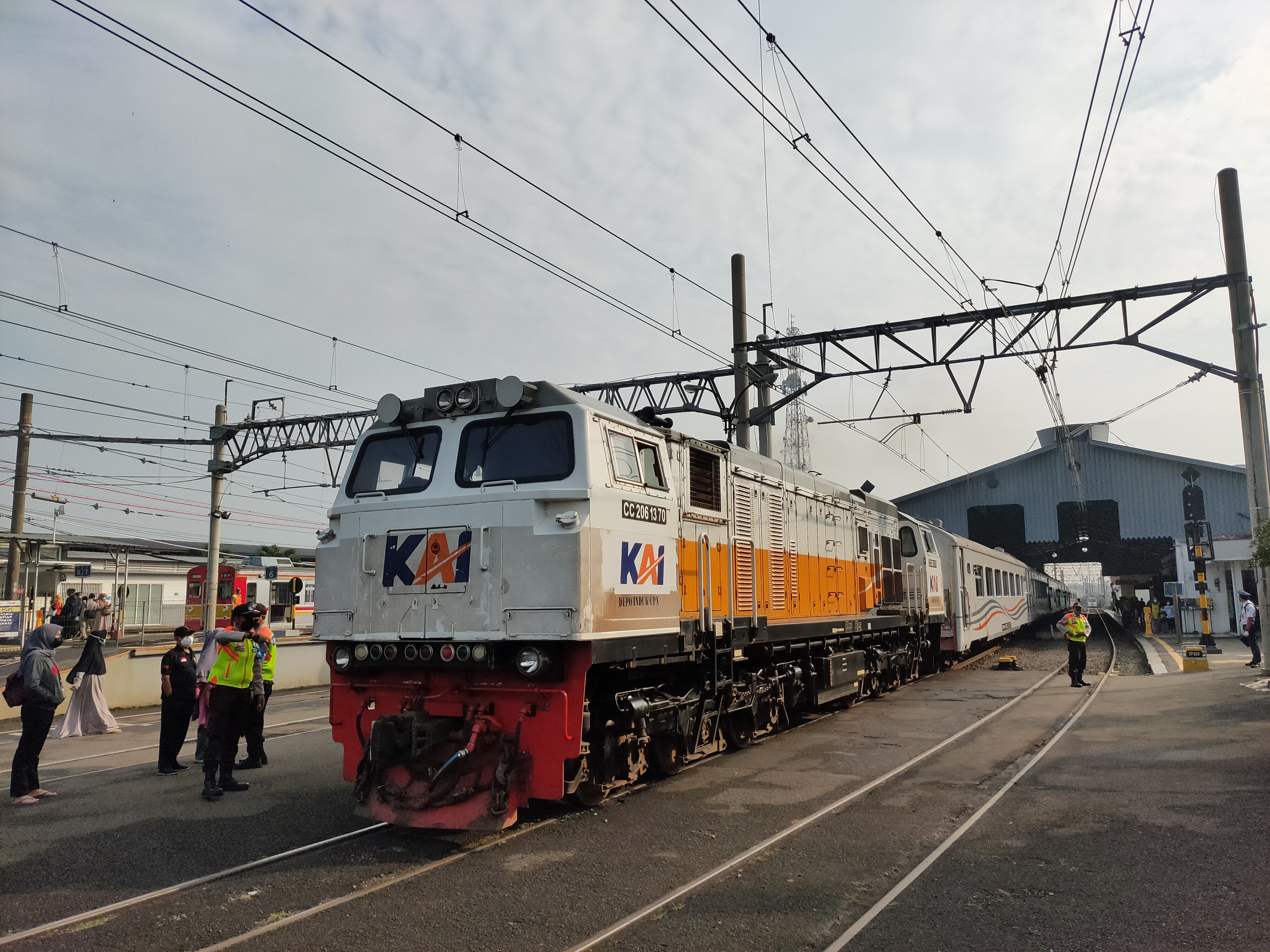
Pangrango train departing from Bogor Station

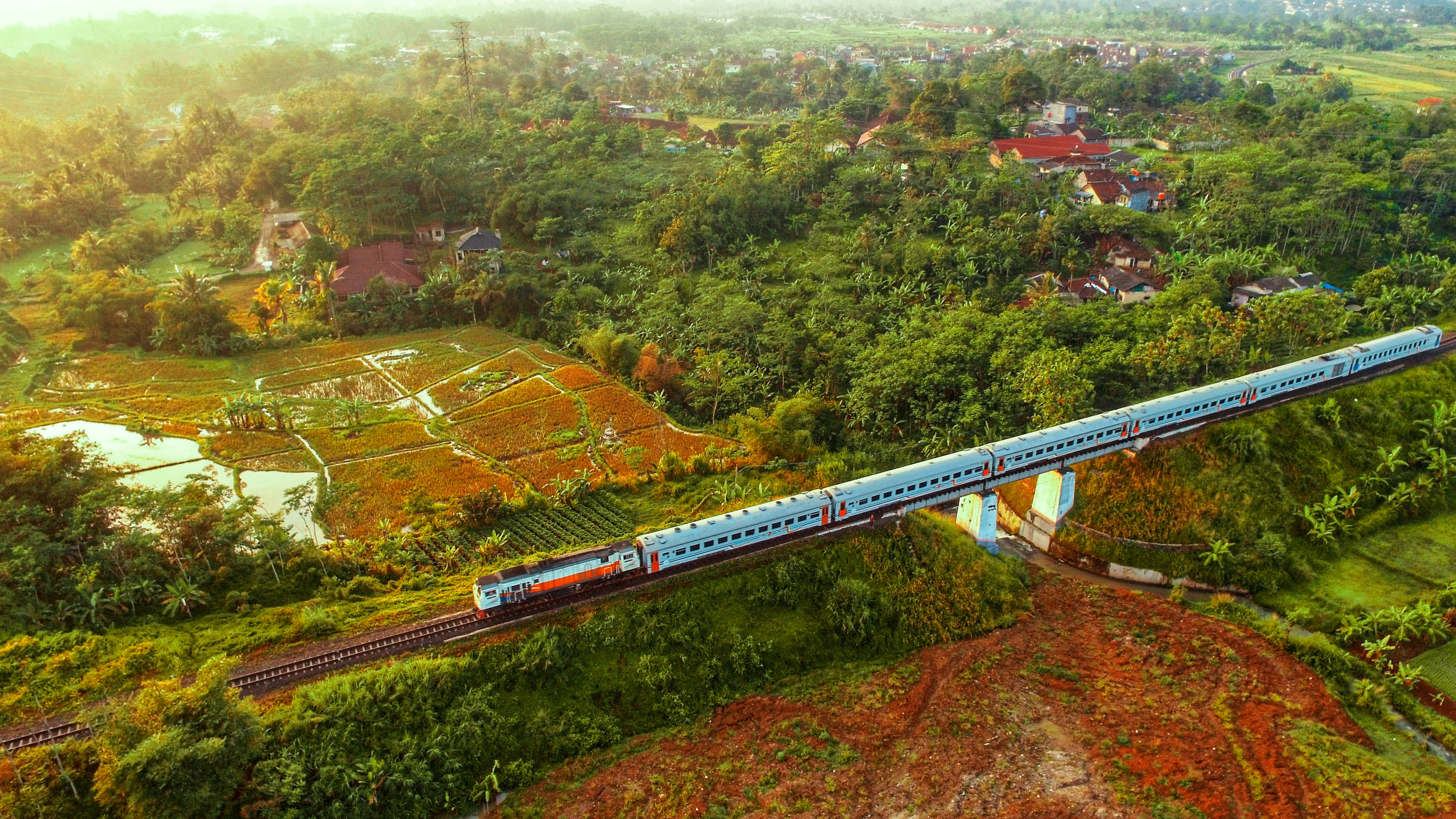
Pangrango train passing through a bridge between Cigombong and Maseng stations
