= Paledang, Bogor =

Paledang
- Village
- Motto: "Bhinneka Tunggal Ika" (Old Javanese)
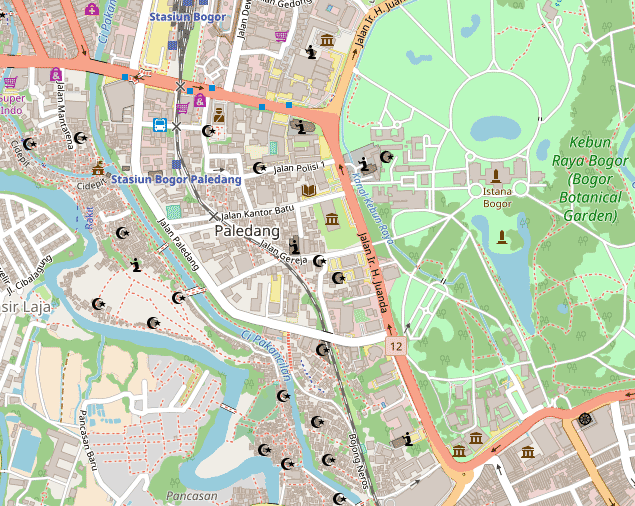
- Map showing Paledang from OpenStreetMap

- Location in Java and Indonesia Paledang (Indonesia)
- Coordinates: 6°35′57″S 106°47′31″E
- Country: Indonesia
- Province: West Java
- City: Bogor
- District: Central Bogor
- Time zone: UTC+7 (IWST)
- Postcode: 16122
- Area code: (+62) 251

Paledang is one of the areas in Central Bogor District, Bogor, West Java, Indonesia. It encompasses the Bogor Botanical Gardens and Istana, plus a bustling urban area to the west between the Gardens and the river. Bogor Paledang railway station serves the Bogor-Sukabumi route.

Because Paledang includes a busy area along the west boundary of the Bogor Botanical Garden and Istana, it has been proposed that this could act as a "buffer zone" between the Botanical Garden and the rest of the city of Bogor.

The area includes shops, businesses, offices and several places of worship including the Roman Catholic Cathedral (BMV Katedral Bogor), the Batak Christian Protestant Church (Gereja HKBP Paledang Bogor) and several mosques including the Masjid At-Taufiq.

An innovative education programme was introduced in the Lembaga Pemasyrakatan (prison) in Paledang to address the economic and health problems that prisoners face after release, due to poverty and unemployment because of prejudice. The programme teaches about personal and family health, and tackles the inaccessibility of expensive medicines by encouraging the use of medicinal plants that can be grown at home in pots.

== Photographs ==
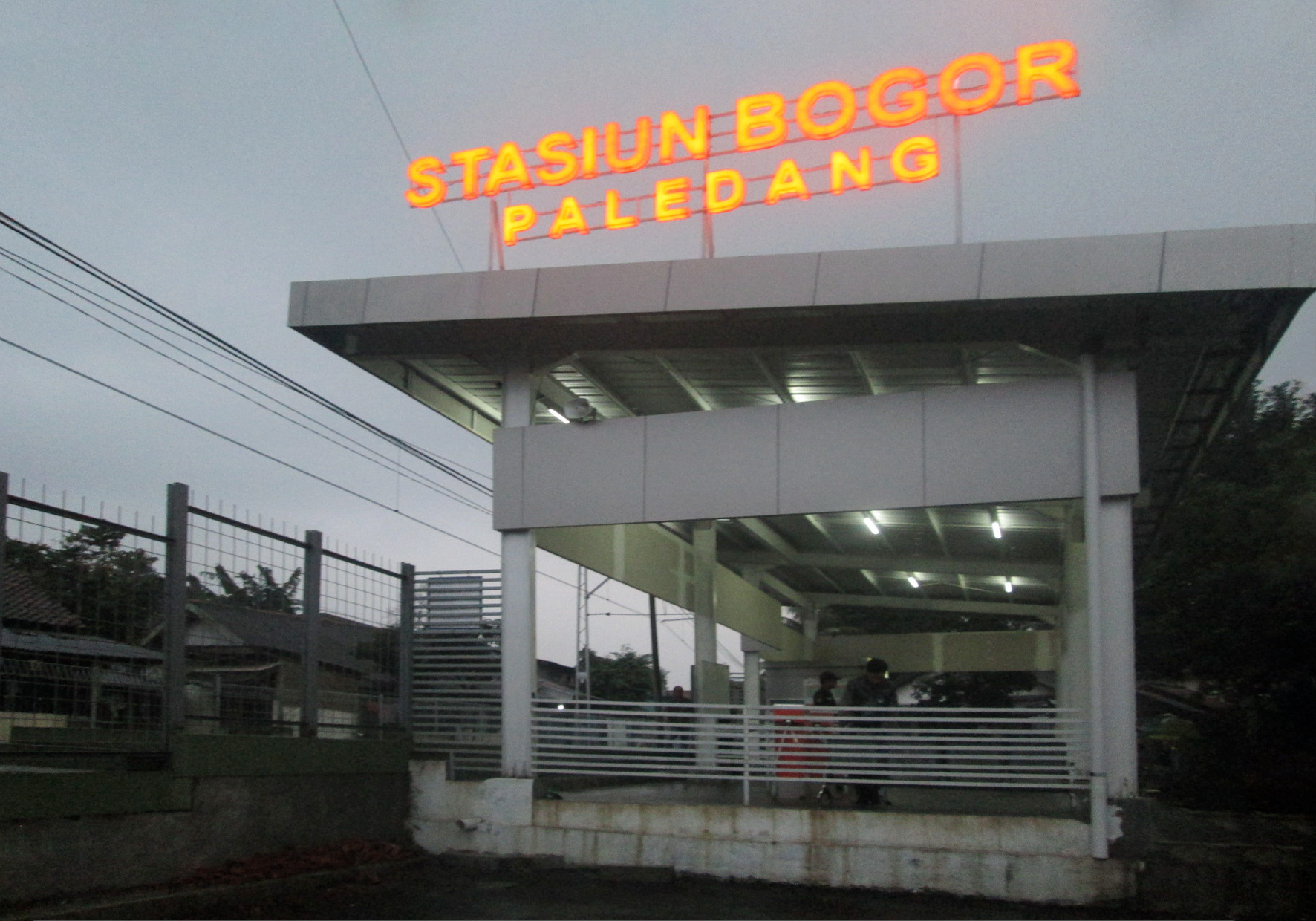
Paledang railway station, 2014

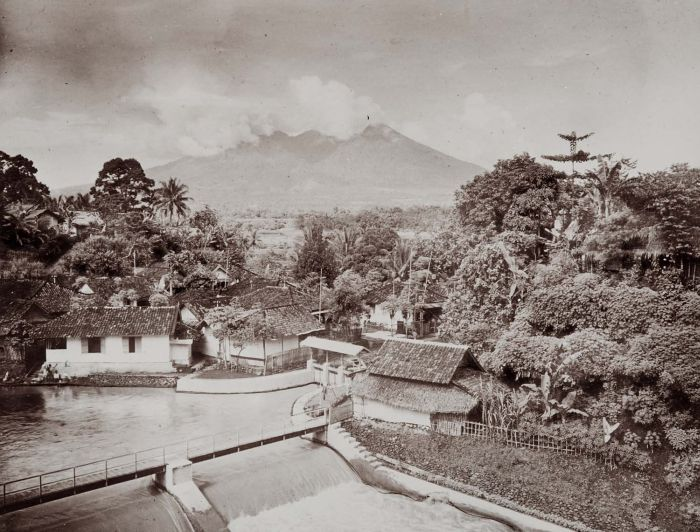
Dam at Paledang and the Salak volcano, taken between 1920 and 1930

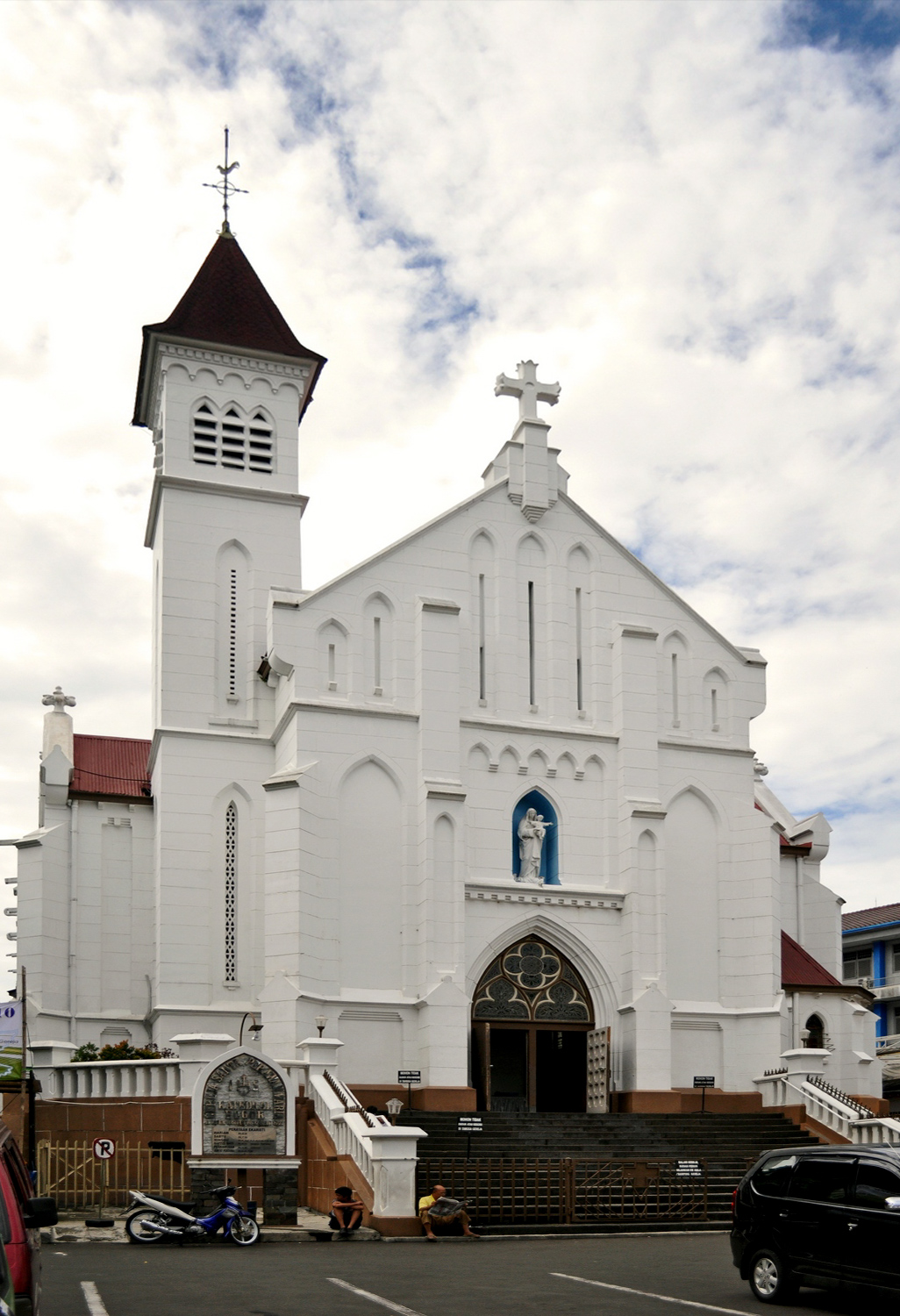
Bogor Roman Catholic Cathedral in Paledang
