= Cijeruk, Bogor =

Cijeruk
- Town and District
- Location in Bogor Regency, Java and Indonesia Cijeruk (Java) Cijeruk (Indonesia)
- Coordinates: 6°41′00″S 106°47′20″E
- Country: Indonesia
- Province: West Java
- Regency: Bogor Regency

Area
  - Total: 37.57 km^{2} (14.51 sq mi)
- Elevation: 587 m (1,926 ft)

Population (mid 2024 estimate)
  - Total: 99,996
  - Density: 2,662/km^{2} (6,893/sq mi)
- Time zone: UTC+7 (IWST)
- Area code: (+62) 251
- Vehicle registration: F
- Villages: 9
- Website: kecamatancijeruk.bogorkab.go.id

Cijeruk is a town and an administrative district (Indonesian: kecamatan) in the Bogor Regency, West Java, Indonesia and thus part of Jakarta's larger conurbation.

Cijeruk District covers an area of 37.57 km^{2}, and had a population of 78,634 at the 2010 Census and 91,662 at the 2020 Census; the official estimate as at mid 2024 was 99,996 (comprising 52,079 males and 47,917 females). The administrative centre is at the town of Cipelang, and the district is sub-divided into nine villages (desa), all sharing the postcode of 16740, as listed below with their areas and populations as at mid 2024.

Kode Wilayah	Name of desa	Area in km^{2}	Population mid 2024 estimate
32.01.28.2003	Warung Menteng	2.28	9,123
32.01.28.2001	Cijeruk (town)	3.21	11,220
32.01.28.2002	Cipelang	6.46	14,144
32.01.28.2006	Cibalung	3.34	10,530
32.01.28.2005	Cipicung	4.61	12,786
32.01.28.2009	Tanjung Sari	1.94	7,122
32.01.28.2004	Tajur Halang	3.95	7,998
32.01.28.2008	Palasari	4.25	11,573
32.01.28.2007	Sukaharja	7.53	15,492
32.01.28	Totals	37.57	99,996
