= Bogor Paledang railway station =

Railway station in Indonesia

Bogor Paledang Station Stasiun Bogor Paledang
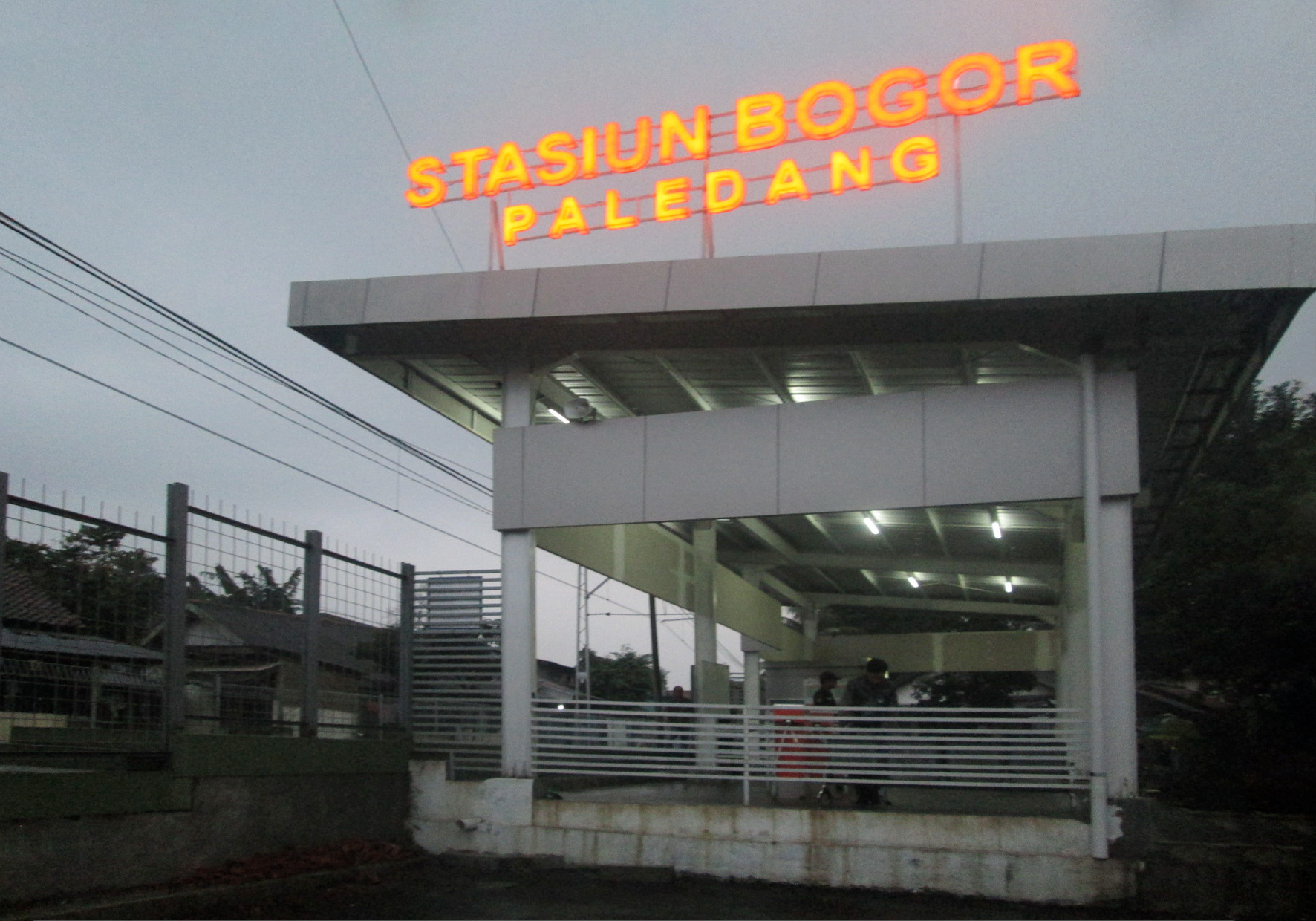
- Station building from street level

General information
- Location: Jl. Nyi Raja Permas, Paledang, Central Bogor, Bogor; West Java; Indonesia
- Coordinates: 6°35′52″S 106°47′26″E
- Elevation: +246 m (807 ft)
- Owner: Kereta Api Indonesia
- Operator: Kereta Api Indonesia
- Line: Manggarai–Padalarang
- Platforms: Triple side platform (under construction)
- Tracks: 3

Construction
- Structure type: Ground
- Parking: Available
- Accessible: Available

Other information
- Station code: BOP
- Classification: Halt

History
- Opened: 9 November 2013

Services
Pangrango
Location
- Location within Java

Bogor Paledang Station (BOP) is a railway station located in the city of Bogor, West Java. The station is located at the altitude of +246 meters above sea level. It opened in 2013 to cut down human traffic in Bogor station which now serves commuter trains, KRL Commuterline. This station only serves Pangrango intercity train to Sukabumi. In October 2014, the station was expanded because the existing waiting room was insufficient for the passengers and the parking area was too small. As part of double tracking project and preparatory works for electrification towards Sukabumi, the station was upgraded from a simple halt into a full fledged station separate from Bogor station's signalling system. A siding track and a downstream track were added on the eastern part of the railyard. The project forced Pangrango services to temporarily stop operations. Pangrango trains only resumed operation until 10 April 2022, much later than other trains affected by COVID-19 pandemic.

== Services ==
The following is a list of train services at the Bogor Paledang Station.

=== Passenger services ===
- Mixed class
  - Pangrango, towards Sukabumi (executive-economy)

Preceding station	Kereta Api Indonesia	Following station
Bogor towards Manggarai	Manggarai–Padalarang	Batutulis towards Padalarang
