= Cianjur railway station =

Railway station in Indonesia

Cianjur Station Stasiun Cianjur
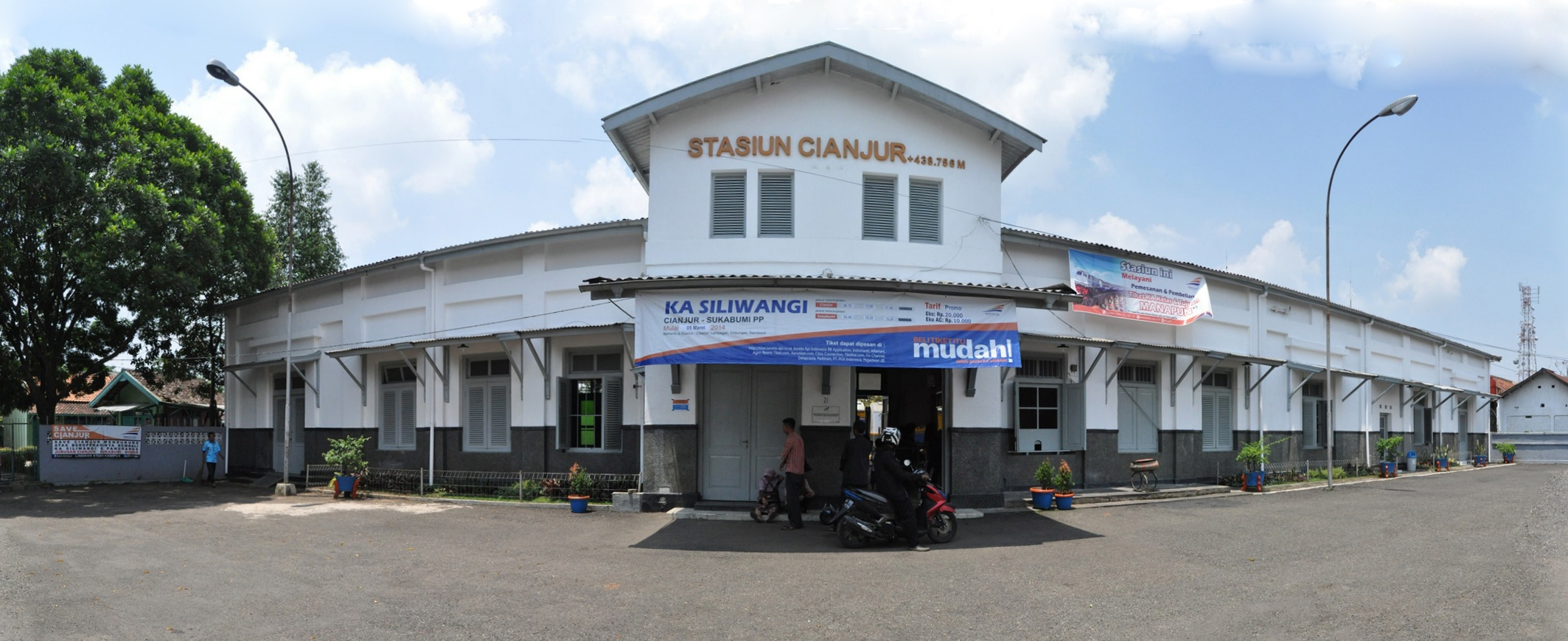
- Entrance of Cianjur Station

General information
- Location: Jl. Yulius Usman, Sayang, Cianjur, Cianjur Regency; West Java; Indonesia
- Coordinates: 6.82452°S 107.143°E
- Elevation: +439 m (1,440 ft)
- Owner: Kereta Api Indonesia
- Operator: Kereta Api Indonesia
- Lines: SW Siliwangi; Manggarai–Padalarang
- Platforms: 2 island platforms 1 side platform
- Tracks: 3

Construction
- Structure type: Ground
- Parking: Available
- Accessible: Available
- Architectural style: New Indies

Other information
- Station code: CJ • 1510
- Classification: Class II

History
- Opened: 10 May 1883
Location
- Location within Java

Cianjur Station (CJ) (Sundanese: ᮞ᮪ᮒᮞᮤᮇᮔ᮪ ᮎᮤᮃᮔ᮪ᮏᮥᮁ, romanized: Stasion Cianjur) is a class II railway station located in Sayang, Cianjur, Cianjur Regency, West Java, Indonesia. The station, which is located at an altitude of 439 m, is included in the Operation Area II Bandung. This station is the station with the highest passenger density on the Cianjur–Padalarang route.

== Building and layout ==
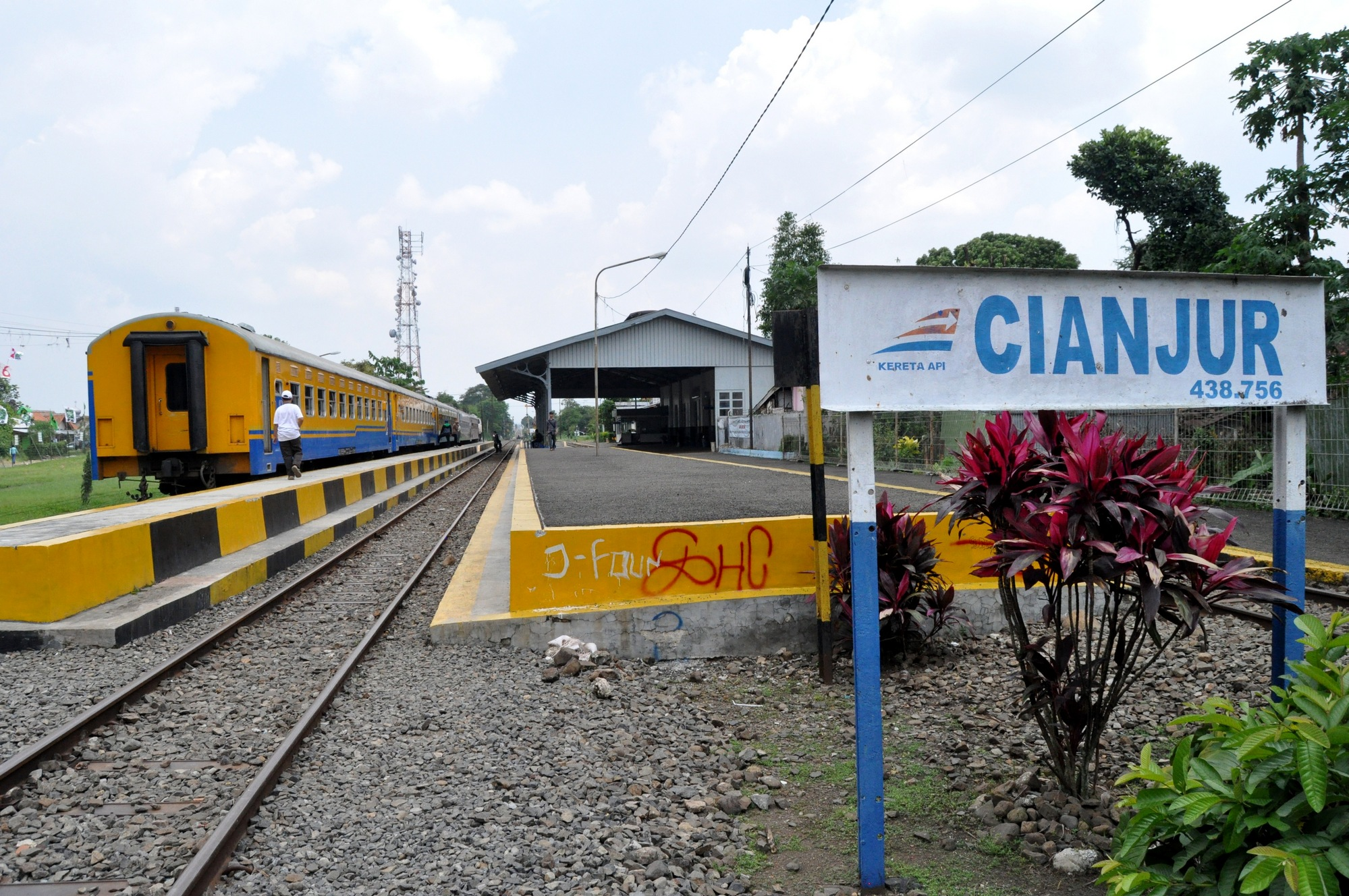
The station building, along with its platform and signage, seen the Siliwangi Train on the left. Date: 1 April 2014.

Cianjur Station initially had six railway tracks, including a track to the warehouse opposite the station. Since most of the Jakarta–Bandung cross trains operate via the Cikampek–Padalarang railway, the number of tracks at this station is reduced to three due to lack of traffic. The station built by Staatsspoorwegen has now been designated as a cultural heritage by the Central Unit for Conservation and Architectural Design of Kereta Api Indonesia.

The Cianjur– Padalarang railroad is a semi-active line because only lorries, dressers and inspection trains can pass through this line. The stations on this line were also briefly reactivated to welcome the Kian Santang train which was planned to operate in March 2014, but the planned regular trips were canceled in 2015 due to technical problems with the infrastructure which was considered unfit for operation.

The Directorate General of Railways of the Ministry of Transportation then decided to repair the Cianjur–Padalarang railroad line, the repairs included replacing the sleepers which were originally iron with concrete and replacing the rail rods which were originally 33/42 kg/m (R33/R42) to 54 kg/meter (R54) so that can be traversed by large and heavy locomotives. For the first stage, the route to be repaired is the Cianjur–Ciranjang section. The trial route was carried out on 22–24 July 2019.

This station also has a uniqueness in the form of playing 3 regional songs, namely "Manuk Dadali", "Karatagan Pahlawan" and "Ayun Ayun Ambing" every train arrival/departure.

== Services ==
Cianjur Station used to serve the Cianjuran train to fill the Bandung-Bogor route. However, the operation of the train was stopped in 2013 due to the unavailability of spare parts for diesel-hydraulic locomotives and subsidies from the Government through the Ministry of Transportation of the Republic of Indonesia.

On 8 February 2014, the station reopened with the launch of Siliwangi train.

The following is a list of train services at the Cianjur Station.

=== Passenger services ===
- Economy class
  - SW Siliwangi, to Cipatat and to Sukabumi

== Gallery ==
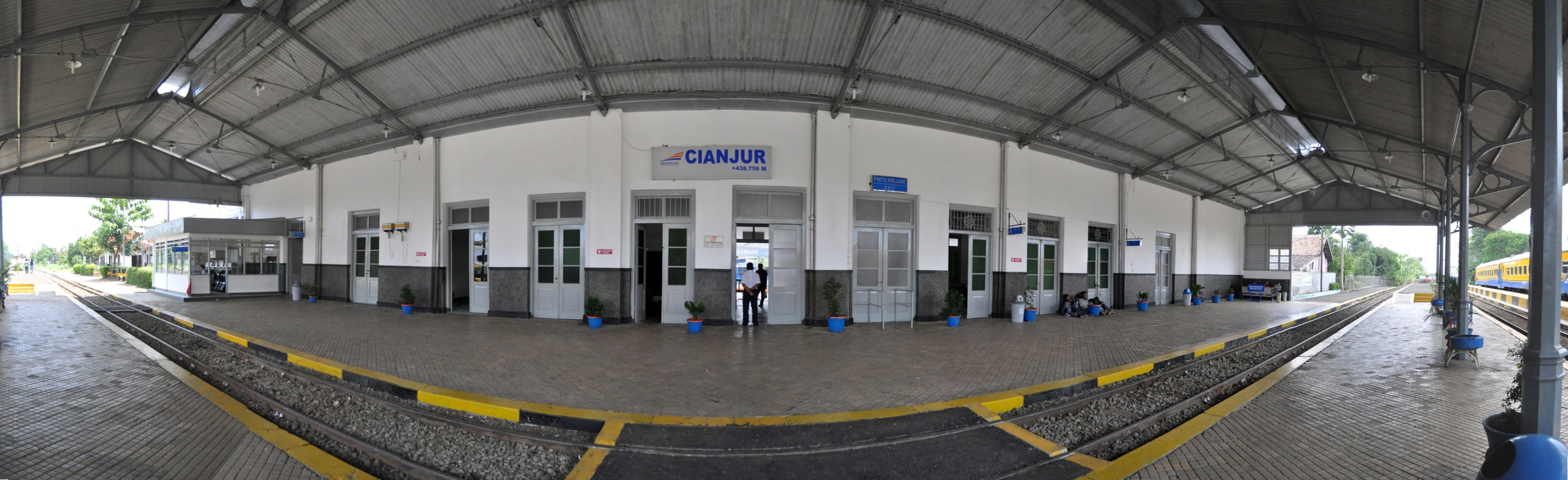
Panoramic view of the station platform

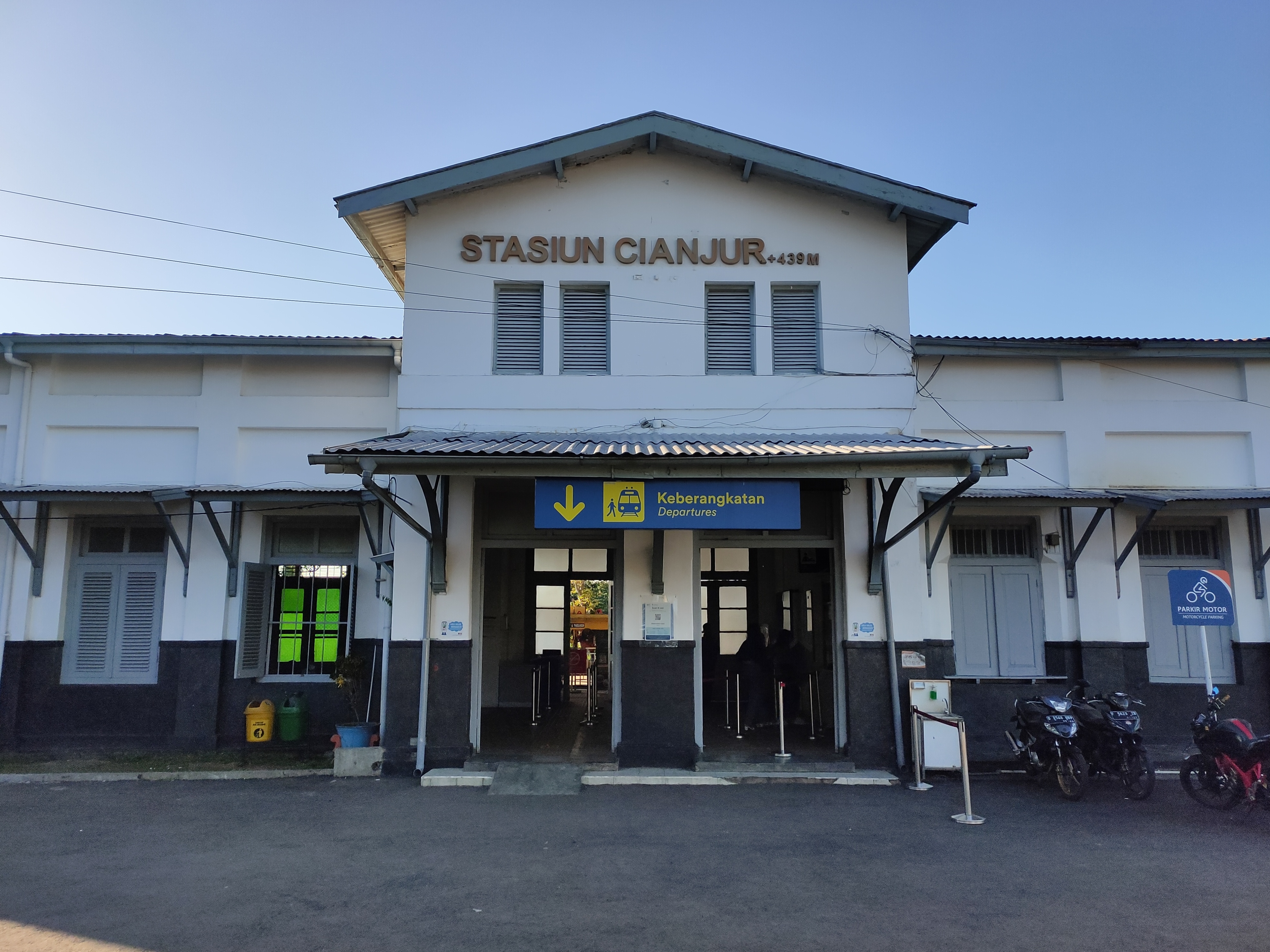
The departure entrance of Cianjur station

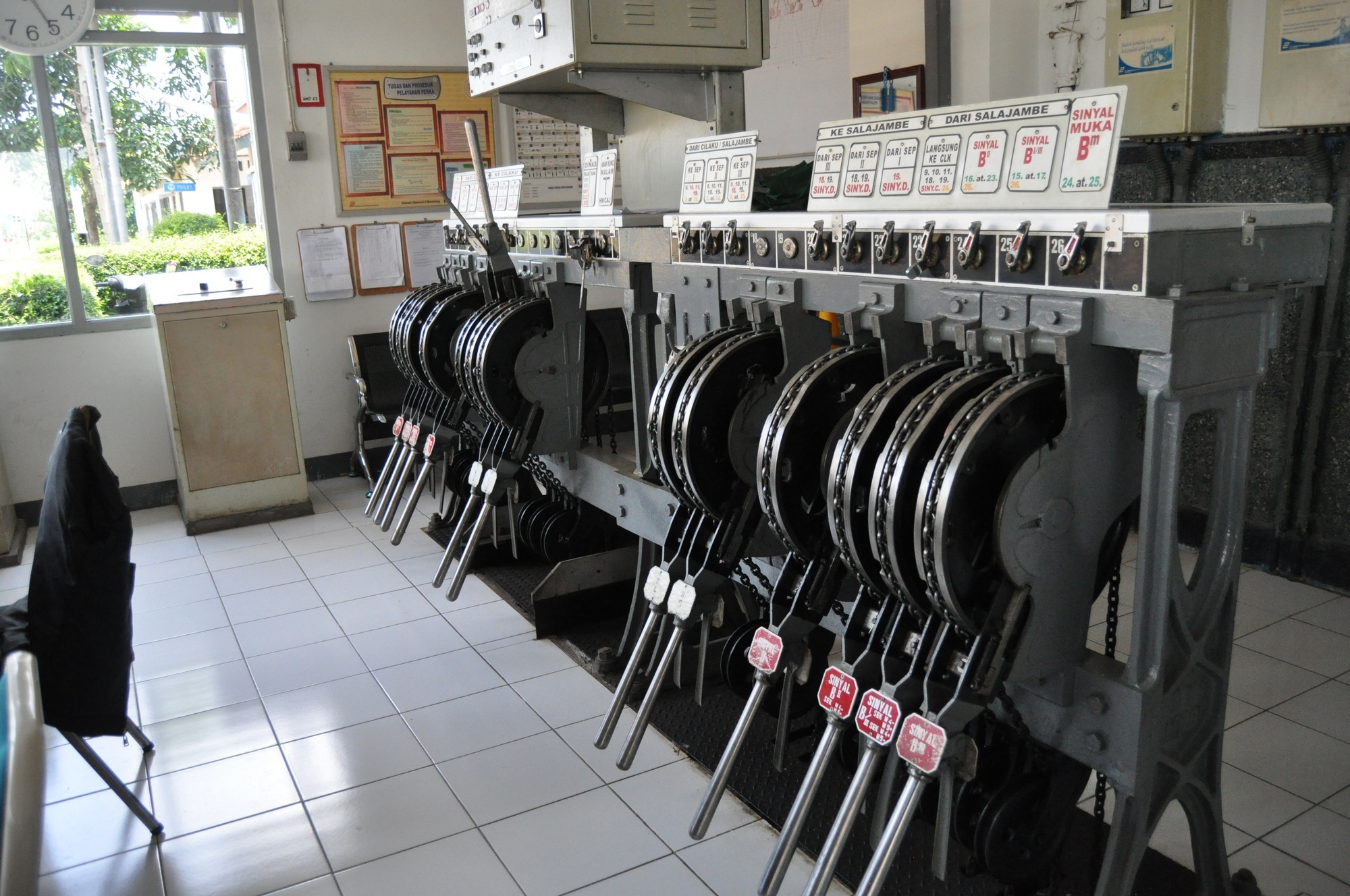
Rail signal levers at the train dispatcher room

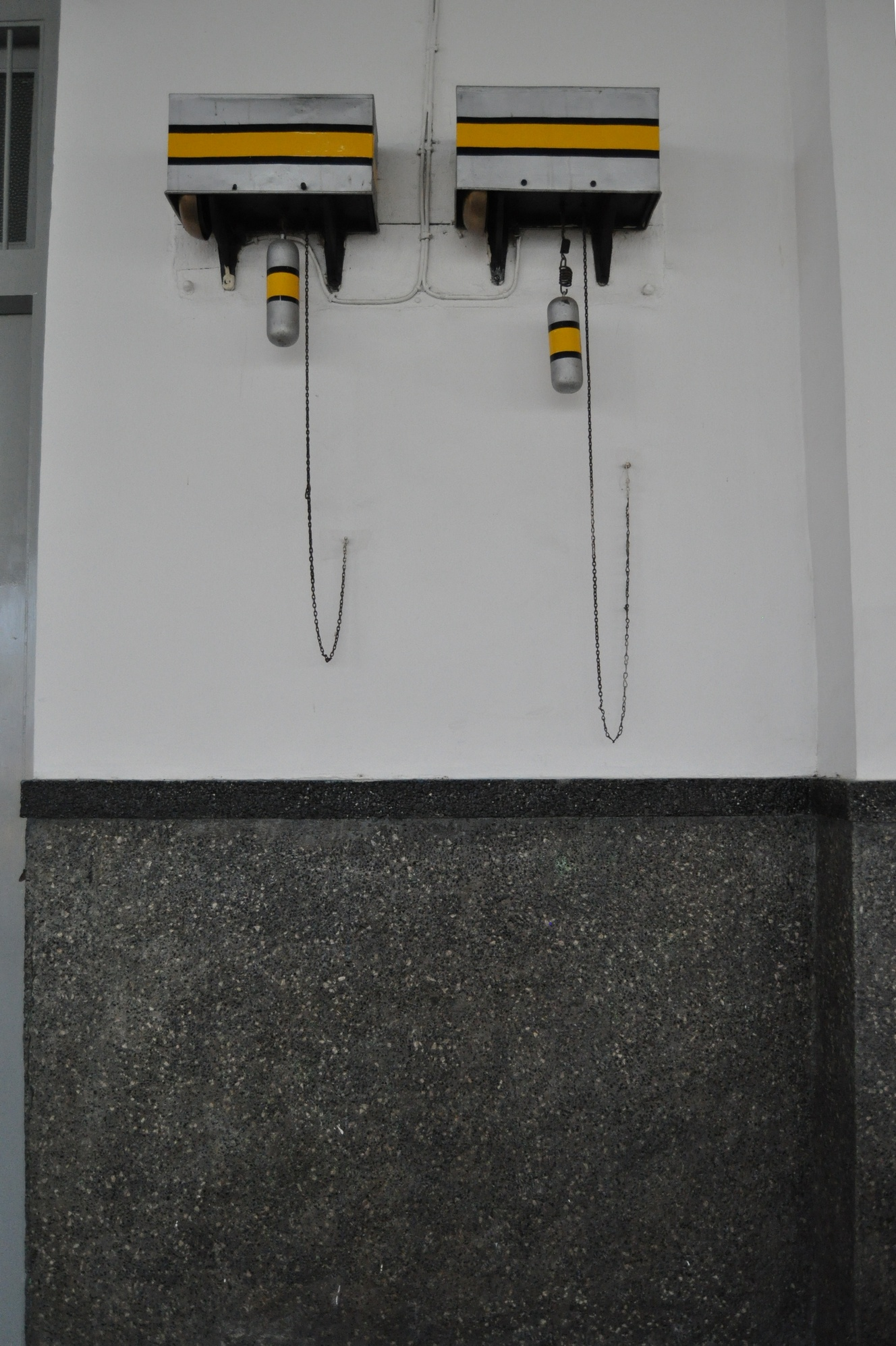
Bell boxes at the station that rings when a train approaches the station

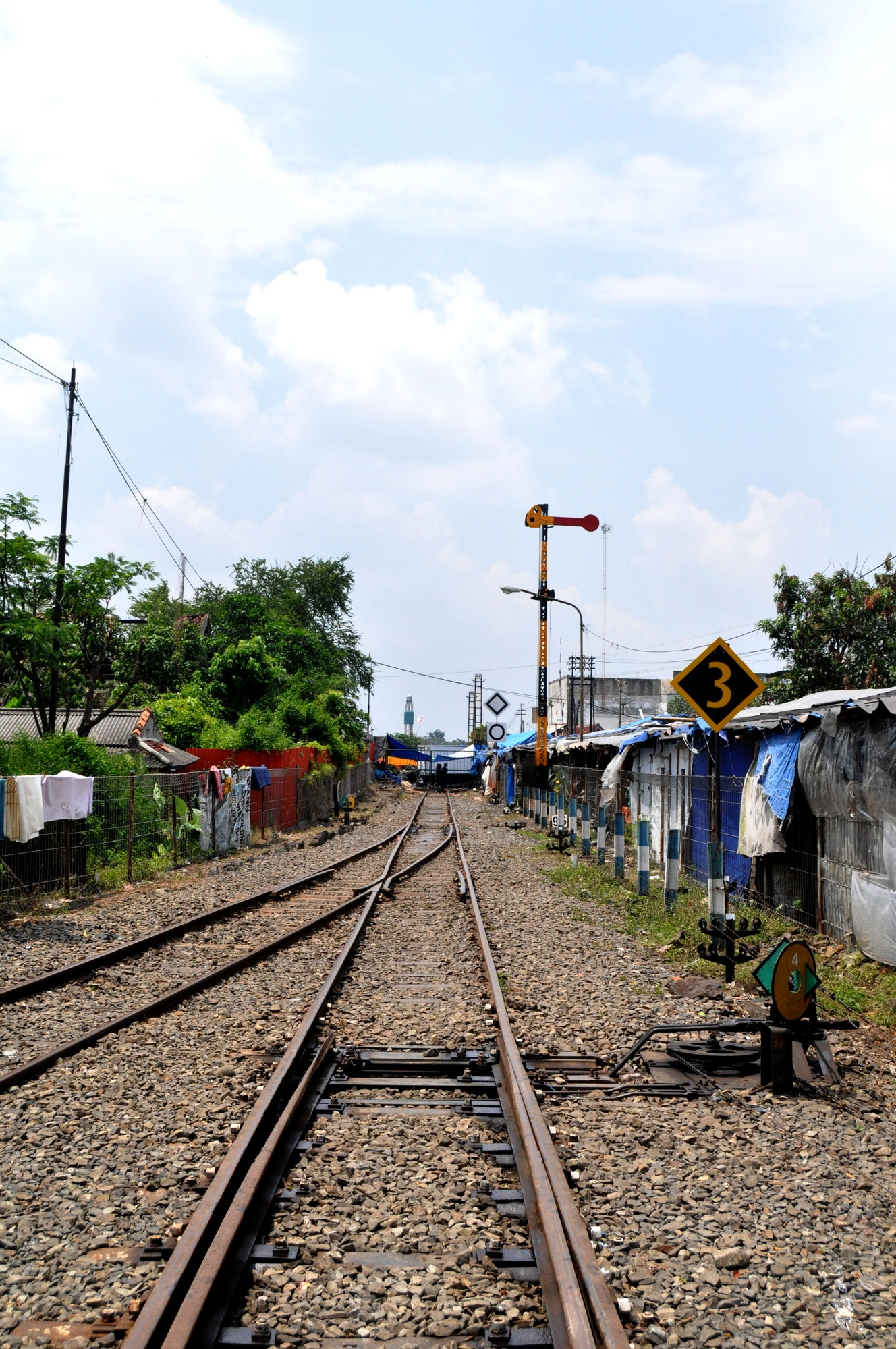
Rail switch and exit signal at the east of the station

Preceding station	Kereta Api Indonesia	Following station
Pasirhayam towards Manggarai	Manggarai–Padalarang	Maleber towards Padalarang
