= Cipatat railway station =

Railway station in Indonesia

Cipatat
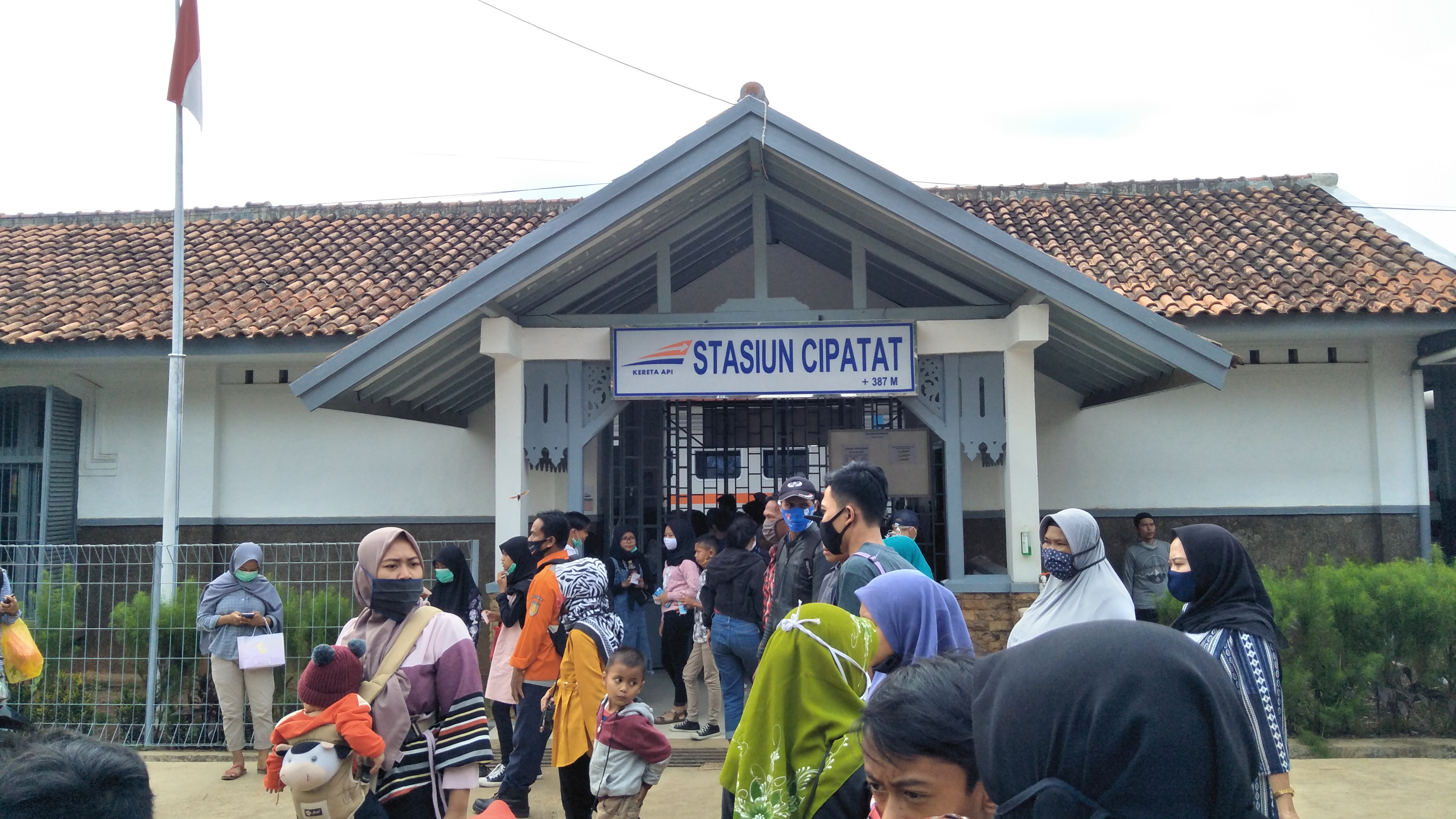
- Cipatat Station, photo was taken on 6 October 2020.

General information
- Location: Jl. Raya Cianjur–Padalarang, Cipatat, Cipatat, West Bandung Regency; West Java; Indonesia
- Coordinates: 6.822008°S 107.386004°E
- Elevation: +387 m (1,270 ft)
- Owner: Kereta Api Indonesia
- Operator: Kereta Api Indonesia
- Lines: Manggarai–Padalarang line; Cipatat–Sasaksaat–Padalarang line (planned)
- Platforms: 1 island platform 1 side platform
- Tracks: 2

Construction
- Structure type: Ground
- Parking: Available
- Accessible: Available

Other information
- Station code: CPT
- Classification: Class III

History
- Opened: 17 May 1884
- Rebuilt: 2019

Key dates
- 21 September 2020: Reopened
Location

Cipatat railway station (Indonesian: Stasiun Cipatat) is a class III railway station located at Cipatat, Cipatat, West Bandung Regency, West Java, Indonesia. The station, which is located at an altitude of +387 m, is included in the Operation Area II Bandung. The station reopened on 21 September 2020, as part of the continuing rehabilitation of the Manggarai–Padalarang line.

== Services ==
The following is a list of train services at the Cipatat Station.

=== Passenger services ===
- Economy class
  - Siliwangi, towards Sukabumi

Preceding station	Kereta Api Indonesia	Following station
Rajamandala towards Manggarai	Manggarai–Padalarang	Tagogapu towards Padalarang
Rajamandala towards Manggarai	Cipatat–Sasaksaat–Padalarang	Sasaksaat towards Padalarang
