= Manggarai–Padalarang railway =

Railway line in Indonesia

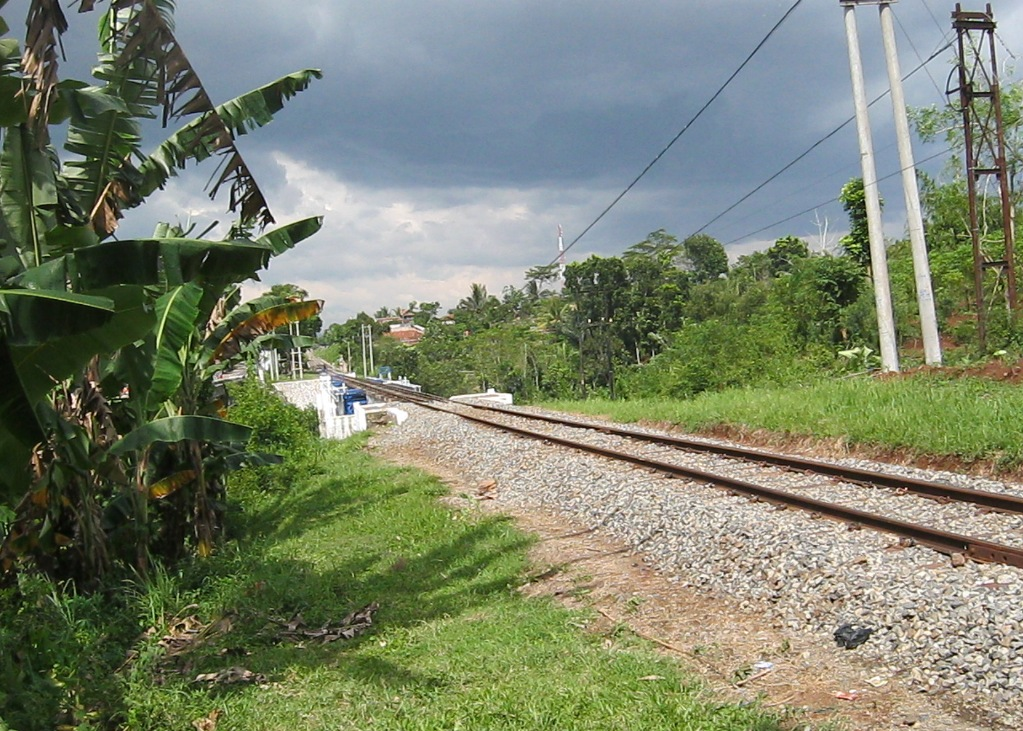
- The line near Cianjur

Overview
- Native name: Jalur kereta api Manggarai–Padalarang railway
- Status: Operational (except at Cipatat-Padalarang segment)
- Owner: Directorate General of Railways
- Locale: Indonesia
- Termini: Manggarai; Padalarang
- Stations: 38

Service
- Operator(s): Kereta Api Indonesia

History
- Opened: 1878

Technical
- Line length: 388 km (241 mi)
- Number of tracks: 2
- Character: Mountain (on Bogor–Padalarang segent)
- Track gauge: 3 ft 6 in (1,067 mm)
- Operating speed: 60–100 km (37–62 mi)
- Highest elevation: 848 m (2,782 ft)

The Manggarai–Padalarang railway is a railway line in Indonesia from Manggarai railway station in Jakarta to Padalarang railway station in West Bandung Regency.

== History ==
In 2001, an earthquake destroyed the Lampegan railway tunnel, which the line passed through. In November 2012, a landslide hit the line near Cilebut.

Passenger service between Cianjur and Padalarang ceased in 2013. Service was restored between Cianjur and Ciranjang in 2019. Passenger service between Ciranjang and Cipatat restarted on 21 September 2020. The final section, a 13.8 kilometres (8.6 mi) long stretch between Cipatat and Padalarang, is expected to reopen by 2022. However, as of March 2025 the Cipatat and Padalarang stretch shows no sign of reactivation.
