= Sukabumi railway station =

Railway station in Indonesia

Sukabumi railway Station
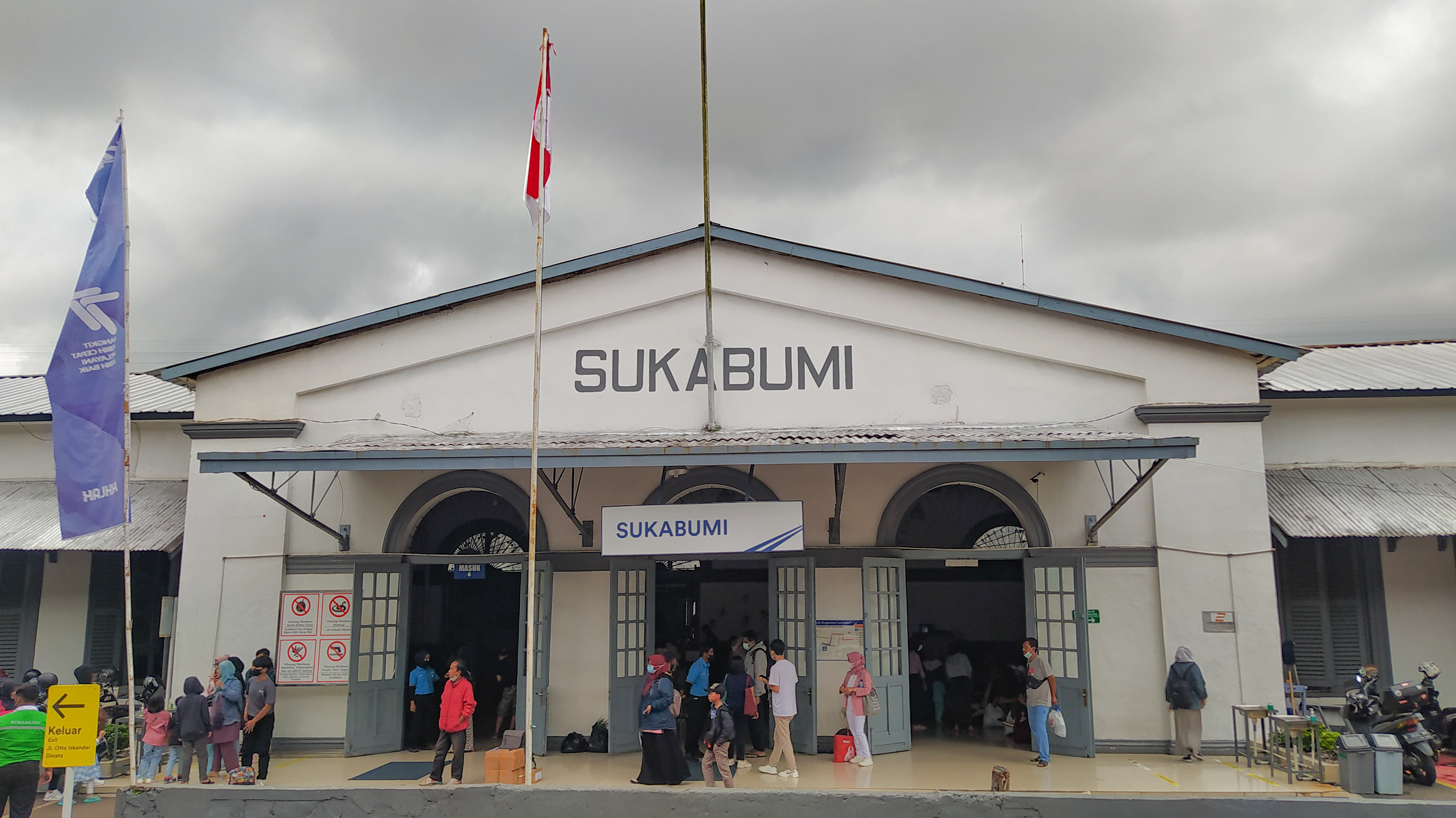
- Sukabumi Station, 2022.

General information
- Location: Jl. Stasiun Barat, Gunungparang, Cikole, Sukabumi; West Java; Indonesia
- Coordinates: 6.9250°S 106.9296°E
- Elevation: +584 m (1,916 ft)
- Owner: Kereta Api Indonesia
- Operator: Kereta Api Indonesia
- Line: Pangrango
- Platforms: 1 island platform 1 side platform
- Tracks: 3

Construction
- Structure type: Ground
- Parking: Available
- Accessible: Available

Other information
- Station code: SI-0820
- Classification: Class II

History
- Opened: 1882
Location

Sukabumi railway station (Sundanese: ᮞᮨᮒᮒ᮪ᮞᮤᮇᮔ᮪ ᮞᮥᮊᮘᮥᮙᮤ, romanized: Setatsion Sukabumi) (Indonesian: Stasiun Sukabumi) is a class II railway station located at Sukabumi, West Java, Indonesia. The station, which is located at an altitude of +584 m, is included in the Operation Area I Jakarta and only train station in Sukabumi.

== History ==
This station used to have five train lines with line 2 being a straight line, but now only lines 1-3 still active. Lines 1 and 2 usually used for Pangrango or Siliwangi train, while line 3 is a storage train.

In addition, this station used to have bahnbetriebswerk and turntables. However, locomotive has been dismantled and now only turntable remains, although its rarely used anymore because PT KAI currently operates CC206 locomotive as newest locomotive which has two driver's cabins so there is no need to rotate position anymore.

Train services at this station open from 4 am to around 10 pm.

== Services ==
The following is a list of train services at the Sukabumi Station.

=== Passenger services ===
- Economy class
  - Siliwangi, towards Cipatat
- Executive-Economy class
  - Pangrango, towards Bogor
